= 2025 MPL Philippines season =

2025 season for professional and amateur tournaments for the Philippines

- League: MPL Philippines
- Sport: Esports
- Duration: February 28—May 4, 2025 (Season 15 - Regular Season) May 28—May 31, 2025 (Season 15 - Playoffs); August 22—October 12, 2025 (Season 16 - Regular Season) October 22—October 26, 2025 (Season 16 - Playoffs)
- Teams: 8

MPL Philippines Season 15
- Top seed: Team Liquid PH
- Season MVP: Kiel Calvin "Oheb" Soriano (TLPH)

MPL Philippines Season 16
- Top seed: Aurora Gaming
- Season MVP: Dylan Aaron "Light" Catipon

Grand Finals
- Venue: Green Sun Hotel (Season 15); Cuneta Astrodome (Season 16)
- Champions: Team Liquid PH (Season 15); Team Liquid PH (Season 16)
- Runners-up: ONIC Philippines (Season 15); Aurora Gaming (Season 16)
- Finals MVP: Alston "Sanji" Pabico (Season 15); Jaypee "Jaypee" Dela Cruz (Season 16)

Seasons
- 2024 2026

The 2025 MPL Philippines season was the eighth year of professional and the third year of amateur gameplay in the Philippines for the multiplayer online battle arena game Mobile Legends: Bang Bang. This year collates two season splits for both MPL Philippines and MDL Philippines.

The year began with the inaugural Magic Chess Go Go World Championships where new teams competed for a new world title. The Magic Chess: Go Go world championships was announced during the announcement portion of the MLBB M6 World Championship in Malaysia. Following the world championship is MPL Philippines Season 15 and MDL Philippines Season 5, the two regional competitions for the professional and amateur scenes of the Philippines. Eight teams are competing for a chance to qualify for second iteration of the Esports World Cup in Riyadh where the Mobile Legends: Bang Bang Mid Season Cup or MSC 2025 will be held coinciding with it. The Philippines has yet to win MSC since 2022 when RSG Philippines won the country's last title.

With the conclusion of MSC 2025, the second split—MPL Philippines Season 16 and MDL Philippines Season 6—was held. MPL Philippines featured the same eight teams to compete for two slots in the upcoming MLBB M7 World Championship. Team Liquid PH became the first back-to-back MPL champions since Blacklist International in 2021.

The seventh iteration of the tournament will be held in Indonesia. The tournament will return to the Southeast Asian giant for the first time since M4. However, similarly to M3, the M7 World Championships will be held in 2026 to avoid scheduling conflicts with the 2025 SEA Games.

== Background ==
The Mobile Legends: Bang Bang Professional League of the Philippines (MPL Philippines) is a professional esports league managed by Moonton Games. MPL Philippines was established with sister-leagues MPL Indonesia and MPL Malaysia (formerly known as MPL MYSG) to accommodate the growing population of esports players for the sports discipline. Since its establishment nine different teams have won the MPL Philippines championship title from Aether Main to most-recently ONIC Philippines. Prior to Season 16, Blacklist International holds the most number of championship titles by any organization in the Philippines with 3, winning Season 7, Season 8, and Season 10.

Since Season 8, the league has transitioned to a franchise-based system, thereby effectively removing the qualifier portion of MPL Philippines. Their transition to a franchise-based league was with their fellow-sister league MPL Indonesia.

== Venue ==
=== Season 15 ===
MPL Philippines Season 15 was held at the Green Sun Hotel in Makati, the same venue for the MPL Philippines Season 14 Regular and Playoffs season. MDL Philippines would remain an online event with the Finals being played offline.

=== Season 16 ===
MPL Philippines Season 16 was the first season since Season 13 with the playoffs and grand finals being held in a different location. Season 16 was held at the Green Sun Hotel in Makati while the Playoffs was at the Cuneta Astrodome in Pasay City.

MPL Philippines Season 15		MPL Philippines Season 16	
Regular Season	Playoffs & Grand Finals	Regular Season	Playoffs & Grand Finals
Green Sun Hotel	Green Sun Hotel	Green Sun Hotel	Cuneta Astrodome
Venue Location for the Season 15 Regular Season, Playoffs, and Grand Finals.		Venue Location for Season 16 Regular Season, Playoffs, and Grand Finals	
Makati City, Philippines	Makati City, Philippines	Makati City, Philippines	Pasay City, Philippines

== Split 1 ==
=== MPL Philippines Season 15 ===
MPL Philippines Season 15
- League: MPL Philippines
- Sport: Esports

Regular Season
- Top seed: Team Liquid PH (12-2)
- Season MVP: Kiel Calvin "Oheb" Soriano (Team Liquid PH)

Playoffs
- Upper Bracket champions: ONIC Philippines
- Lower Bracket champions: Team Liquid PH
- Lower Bracket runners-up: Team Falcons PH
- Finals champions: Team Liquid PH
- Runners-up: ONIC Philippines
- Finals MVP: Sanji "Sanji" Pabico

Seasons
- ← S14 S16 →

Season 15 was the fifteenth iteration of MPL Philippines and the seventh season since the league transitioned to the franchise-base system. Season 15 featured eight franchise teams that have competed during MPL Philippines Season 14.Team Liquid made its entry during the midpoint of MPL Philippines Season 13 after acquiring Aura Esports, the organization that held teams in MPL Indonesia and the Philippines. The most-recent entry for any team was Dota 2 organization Aurora Gaming who acquired the slot of Minana EVOS during the offseason of Season 14.

Season 15 is well known for the departures of the two original franchises for MPL Philippines: Blacklist International and RSG Philippines. Both of their slots have been bought out by Saudi Arabian-organizations Team Falcons and Twisted Minds.

==== Offseason ====
Notable Returns

- Tristan "Yawi" Cabrera returns to MPL Philippines. He previously played for Team Liquid Indonesia before returning to MPL Philippines under TNC Pro Team.
- Sanford "Sanford" Vinuya has resigned with Team Liquid Philippines on a contract extension. Vinuya was rumored to join ONIC Indonesia until the team's manager Mitch Liwanag rebuked all rumors and said that Vinuya has agreed to a contract extension with the squad.
- Rodel "Ar Sy" Cruz signs with Team Liquid Philippines as their new coach. Ar Sy previously served as the Head Coach for Falcon Esports in Myanmar. He will be the team's new head coach as former head coach Tictac transitions to a managerial post.
- James "Jeymz" Gloria is returns Philippines to become the starting Exp-Laner for Twisted Minds. Gloria previously was a substitute Exp-Laner for Nexplay EVOS and TLPH Academy before transferring to Team Liquid Indonesia.
- Frediemar "3MarTzy" Serafico returns to the Philippines and joins TNC Pro Team as their starting Exp-Laner. Serafico previously played for TNC Pro Team during Season 8 and was the Exp-Laner of ECHO Philippines (now Team Liquid PH) for Season 9 and 10. He transferred to Pendekar Esports in Indonesia and had a brief stint with See You Soon.
- Stephen "Sensui" Castillo returns to the Philippines and joins Twisted Minds as their substitute Jungler. Castillo played a brief stint in MPL Malaysia under RED Esports. Before that he was the starting jungler for ONIC Philippines and Blacklist International.
- Francis "Duckey" Glindro left AP Bren during the roster's complete exodus for Team Falcons. Since then, Glindro has been a notable free agent as a head coach. However, on May 15, 2025, Team Falcons announced that Glindro will become the Southeast Asian (SEA) Head Coach. This is in part of the country's preparation for the 2025 IESF World Championship.

Transfers

- Justine "Zaida" Palma has transferred from Team Liquid Philippines to TNC Pro Team. Palma had been the sixth man for TLPH as a substitute Jungler.
- Kiel Calvin "Oheb" Soriano has transferred from Blacklist International to Team Liquid Philippines. Soriano will be filling in the spot of Frederic "Bennyqt" Gonzales. Soriano had been the starting Gold Laner for Blacklist until the team's disbandment in early 2025.
- Louis "Louis" Ariola has been promoted to the MPL roster for Smart Omega and will be the team's starting Exp-Laner. Ariola will be filling the shoes of former Exp-Laner Nowee "Ryota" Macasa.
- Jaylord "Hate" Gonzales has transferred from TNC Pro Team to ONIC Philippines as their substitute sixth man. Gonzales had been the substitute mid-laner for TNC Pro Team during Season 14. He returns to ONIC Philippines after previously playing for the team back from Season 7 to 9.
- Several members of the former Blacklist International squad have transferred to Twisted Minds including Jhonville "Outplayed" Villar, Imam "Hadji" Salic, and Michael "MP the King" Endino.
- Former Blacklist International Roamer John "Perkz" Sumawan has transferred to Team Liquid Academy, the development roster of Team Liquid PH. Sumawan spent one season with Blacklist International with the team placing fourth during their last season in MPL PH S14.

Notable International Transfers and Departures

- Dylan "Light" Catipon left RSG Philippines for Bigetron Alpha and joining former teammate Eman "Emann" Sangco in the region. Catipon played for TNC Pro Team and Z4 Esports before transferring to RSG Philippines. He won 1 MPL Philippines title and 1 MSC title with the squad.
- Jomearie "Escalera" Santos transferred to HomeBois MY after a brief season stint with TNC Pro Team. Santos was announced to be the stand-in player for HomeBois for ESL Snapdragon Pro Series Season 6. However, this stint would be short-lived as Santos joined the Philippine squad Twisted Minds.
- Ben "Benthings" Maglaque has left Aurora Gaming after spending one season with the team. He is currently a free agent.
- Team Falcons has bought out the entire roster of AP Bren for Season 15. Team Falcons and AP Bren formerly partnered together to be "Falcons AP Bren" and won the M5 World Championship title under the name.
- Longtime franchise head coach Francis "Duckyyy" Glindro has left AP Bren after five years with the team. Glindro led the organization to two MLBB world championship titles and two MPL titles in Season 6 and Season 12.
- Nowee "Ryota" Macasa has been demoted to the MDL team of Smart Omega, Omega Neos. Macasa was the team's starting Exp Laner. Later, Macasa transferred to MPL Indonesia as ONIC Esports' starting Exp Laner.
- Frederic "Bennyqt" Gonzales left Team Liquid Philippines after spending eight seasons with the team. Formerly known as ECHO Philippines, he appeared in three MPL Philippine finals in Season 10, Season 11, and Season 13 winning both 11 and 13. He was also the Finals MVP for the M4 World championship run. Gonzales is now the current Gold Laner for TNC Pro Team.

Other events

- Blacklist International and RSG Philippines have officially left MPL Philippines and are not competing in Season 15. Their spots were taken over by Saudi Arabian-teams Team Falcons and Twisted Minds.

=== Regular season ===
==== Rosters ====
Denotes that the player/coach has been with the team since last season.
Denotes that the player/coach is a new addition to the roster.
Denotes that the team is the defending champion.

Team/Lane	AP Bren	Aurora Gaming	ONIC Philippines	Omega Esports	Team Falcons	Team Liquid	Twisted Minds	TNC Pro Team
Manager	Adi	Rada	—N/a	Rianne	Ren Vitug	Tictac	Lexie	Scholar
Head Coach	Bom	Master the Basics	YnoT	SN4P	Trebor	Ar Sy	Bon Chan	Imbadeejay
Assistant Coach	Pakbet	Dex Star	Haze	Lembot	—N/a	—N/a	ESON	Xemy
Exp Lane	Der	Edward	Kirk	Louis	FlapTzy	Sanford	Jeymz	Lord JM
Jungle	Jamespangks	Demonkite	K1NGKONG	Andoryuuu	KyleTzy	KarlTzy	MP the King	Zaida
Mid Lane	Chovyskrt	Yue	Super Frince	Ukir	Pheww	Sanji	Hadji	LanceCy
Gold Lane	Shizou	Domengkite	Kelra	Yoshinu	Super Marco	Oheb	Outplayed	Kouzen
Roamer	Kekedot	Renejay	Brusko	Ch4knu	Owgwen	Jaypee	Escalera	Yawi
Sixth Man	Sindel	Calad	Hate	Jowm	Pando	YukTzy	Sensui / Jamal	Koyl / 3MarTzy

MPL Philippines follows a double-round robin tournament format where each team face each other twice during the regular season. Each team will play 14 Best of three matches for the entirety of the first split. The top six teams will advance to the playoffs.

Notable free agents

The following players have been listed as free agents after leaving a certain team last season and has not signed with a new club for this season in any league.

- Ben "Benthings" Maglaque (Free agent as of February 12, 2025)
- Brian "SpiderMilez" Santos (Free agent as of February 12, 2025)
- Carlito "Ribo" Ribo Jr. (Free agent as of February 12, 2025)
- Brian "Panda" Im Chang-rok (Free agent as of February 12, 2025)

=== Standings ===
Pos	Team	Pld	W	L	GF	GA	GD	Pts	Qualification
1	Team Liquid PH (Q)	14	12	2	26	8	+18	12	Season's Top Seed; Upper Bracket Berth
2	Aurora Gaming (Q)	14	12	2	25	11	+14	12	Qualified to the Upper-Bracket Semifinals
3	ONIC Philippines (Q)	14	11	3	24	10	+14	11	Qualified to the Play-in Tournament
4	Team Falcons PH (Q)	14	8	6	19	15	+4	8	Qualified to the Play-in Tournament
5	TNC Pro Team (Q)	14	5	9	14	19	−5	5	Qualified to the Play-in Tournament
6	Twisted Minds PH (Q)	14	3	11	10	23	−13	3	Qualified to the Play-in Tournament
7	AP.Bren (E)	14	3	11	9	24	−15	3	Eliminated from Playoff Contention
8	Omega Esports (E)	14	2	12	8	25	−17	2	Eliminated from Playoff Contention

Updated to match(es) played on May 3, 2025. Source:
(E) Eliminated; (Q) Qualified for the phase indicated

Team	APBR	RORA	OMGE	ONIC	FCON	TLPH	TNCP	TWIS
AP.Bren	—N/a	1-4 (1-2, 0-2)	4-1 (2-0, 2-1)	0-4 (0-2, 0-2)	3-3 (2-1, 1-2)	0-4 (0-2, 0-2)	0-4 (0-2, 0-2)	1-4 (1-2, 0-2)
Aurora Gaming	4-1 (2-0, 2-1)	—N/a	4-1 (2-0, 2-1)	3-3 (2-1, 1-2)	4-1 (2-0, 2-1)	2-3 (2-1, 0-2)	4-2 (2-1, 2-1)	4-0 (2-0, 2-0)
Smart Omega	1-4 (1-2, 0-2)	1-4 (1-2, 0-2)	—N/a	1-4 (1-2, 0-2)	0-4 (0-2, 0-2)	1-4 (1-2, 0-2)	0-4 (0-2, 0-2)	4-1 (2-0, 2-1)
ONIC Philippines	4-0 (2-0, 2-0)	3-3 (2-1, 1-2)	4-1 (2-0, 2-1)	—N/a	3-2 (2-0, 1-2)	2-3 (2-1, 0-2)	4-0 (2-0, 2-0)	4-1 (2-0, 2-1)
Team Falcons PH	3-3 (2-1, 1-2)	1-4 (1-2, 0-2)	4-0 (2-0, 2-0)	2-3 (2-1, 0-2)	—N/a	1-4 (1-2, 0-2)	4-1 (2-1, 2-0)	4-0 (2-0, 2-0)
Team Liquid PH	4-0 (2-0, 2-0)	3-2 (2-0, 1-2)	4-1 (2-1, 2-0)	3-2 (2-0, 1-2)	4-1 (2-1, 2-0)	—N/a	4-1 (2-1, 2-0)	4-1 (2-1, 2-0)
TNC Pro Team	4-0 (2-0, 2-0)	2-4 (1-2, 1-2)	4-0 (2-0, 2-0)	0-4 (0-2, 0-2)	1-4 (1-2, 0-2)	1-4 (1-2, 0-2)	—N/a	2-3 (2-1, 0-2)
Twisted Minds PH	4-1 (2-1, 2-0)	0-4 (0-2, 0-2)	1-4 (1-2, 0-2)	1-4 (1-2, 0-2)	1-4 (1-2, 0-2)	0-4 (0-2, 0-2)	3-2 (2-0, 1-2)	—N/a

TNC Pro Team's win over AP Bren during Week 1 was the team's first win since MPL Philippines Season 13. TNC went 0–14 in the previous season which prolonged to 0-15 when they lost their opening match to the defending champions ONIC Philippines.

MPL Philippines would halt the season from the period of April 13 to April 20 in observance to the Holy Week. Moreover, the league halted its matches to make way for the ESL Snapdragon Mobile Masters 2025 for teams who qualified for both the play-ins and playoffs.

=== Playoffs ===
After a three-week break, the Season 15 playoffs began to determine the Philippines' two representatives for MSC 2025.

==== Play-in Tournament ====
(#3) ONIC Philippines vs. (#6) Twisted Minds PH

Defending champions ONIC Philippines are matched up against Twisted Minds PH who barely made the playoffs with a 3–11 record. ONIC Philippines came in as the overwhelming favorites for the series. After a 2–0 lead over Twisted Minds, the underdogs tied up the series for the first of four-consecutive game-five series in the playoffs which ultimately went to ONIC Philippines. ONIC eliminated Twisted Minds and advanced to the next round against Aurora Gaming.

(#4) Team Falcons PH vs. (#5) TNC Pro Team

For the second matchup, it's M5 world champions roster now under Team Falcons PH against TNC Pro Team who qualified for the playoffs for the first time since their franchise-best 9–5 record during MPL Philippines Season 9. In another best-of-five series against the former world championship roster Team Falcons, Team Falcons held the advantage at a 2–1 series but with a rally in Game 4, its series became the second-consecutive five-game series. Team Falcons however would win Game 5 over TNC Pro Team which qualified them for the playoffs, the first time in a while that the Top 4 were included in the playoff picture.

==== Upper Bracket Semifinals ====
(#2) Aurora Gaming vs. (#3) ONIC Philippines

Defending champions ONIC Philippines would face off the super team Aurora Gaming in a rematch from the Grand Finals. In another close-series of trading games left and right, ONIC PH would prevail and hold a 3–0 head-to-head record in the playoffs. In Season 14, they lost in two series—including the Grand Finals—to then Fnatic ONIC Philippines and this becomes their third series loss against ONIC Philippines in a series in the playoffs. ONIC would make it to the Upper Bracket Finals in a 50-50 chance to qualify for MSC.

(#1) Team Liquid PH vs. (#4) Team Falcons PH

Top seed Team Liquid PH saw themselves in an 0–2 hole over Team Falcons. However, Team Liquid would prevail in three-straight matches over Team Falcons, play after play that sent the Falcons down to the lower-bracket semifinals against Aurora and in a potential elimination match for them.

==== Upper Bracket Finals ====
(#1) Team Liquid PH vs. (#3) ONIC Philippines

Team Liquid Philippines and ONIC Philippines qualified for the Upper Bracket Finals and was the first time that a first seed would matchup with the three-seed in the upper-bracket in a long while. The only three-seed who prevailed in the upper-bracket finals against another team were ONIC during Season 5, Execration in Season 7, and Blacklist International in a back-to-back campaign in Seasons 11 and 12.

==== Lower Bracket Semifinals ====
(#2) Aurora Gaming vs. (#4) Team Falcons PH

After both teams' loss early in the upper-bracket semifinals, former M6 representatives and grand finalists Aurora Gaming matched up against former MSC 2024 representatives and M5 champions Team Falcons in the lower bracket semifinals. As reflected by the upper bracket finals, Team Falcons PH, with their extensive playoff experience and veteran leadership of its players, swept the second-seed Aurora Gaming 3–0 to face Team Liquid PH in the lower-bracket finals and in another chance to qualify for MSC.

==== Lower Bracket Finals ====
(#1) Team Liquid PH vs. (#4) Team Falcons PH

The two former MSC 2024 representatives were battling each other in the lower bracket finals in a best-of-seven series. This is the second-consecutive season where the lower bracket finals is a best of seven. Team Liquid PH orchestrated a 2–0 lead early in the series which was then countered by Falcons after a Game 3 dominant win. However, TLPH would still win Game 4 to get match point until a Game 5 win over the squad that pushed the series to six games. In Game 6, Falcons would be eliminated as TLPH qualified for MSC and their fifth finals appearance.

==== Grand Finals ====
(#1) Team Liquid Philippines vs. (#3) ONIC Philippines

Team Liquid PH and ONIC Philippines were the grand finalists for MPL Philippines Season 15, a rematch of the upper-bracket finals where ONIC swept Team Liquid that qualified them for MSC 2025. The best of seven series saw an immediate back-and-forth of game wins from both sides but ultimately, Team Liquid PH won in seven games over ONIC Philippines, denying ONIC a chance to repeat as champions.

Grand Finals	June 1	ONIC Philippines	3	–	4	Team Liquid Philippines	Makati City, Philippines
	17:00 (UTC+8)						
		Gold: 62.64k Turrets: 5  Lord(s): 0  Turtle(s): 1  Blue Buff: 7  Orange Buff: 11	Game 1; 23:06; ONIC 8 - 17 TLPH; Team Liquid PH leads, 1–0			Gold: 68.98k Turrets: 9  Lord(s): 4  Turtle(s): 1  Blue Buff: 15  Orange Buff: 10	
		Gold: 65.16k Turrets: 8 Lord(s): 1  Turtle(s): 0 Blue Buff: 11 Orange Buff: 11	Game 2; 22:20; ONIC 13 - 10 TLPH; Series tied, 1–1			Gold: 62.69k Turrets: 4 Lord(s): 2 Turtle(s): 3 Blue Buff: 12 Orange Buff: 9	
		Gold: 59.83k Turrets: 7 Lord(s): 1  Turtle(s): 2 Blue Buff: 10  Orange Buff: 11	Game 3; 21:06; ONIC 14 - 10 TLPH; ONIC Philippines leads the series, 2–1			Gold: 56.98k Turrets: 5 Lord(s): 2 Turtle(s): 1 Blue Buff: 12 Orange Buff: 10	
		Gold: 38.16k Turrets: 2 Lord(s): 0  Turtle(s): 0 Blue Buff: 7  Orange Buff: 5	Game 4; 14:20; ONIC 6 - 12 TLPH; Series tied, 2–2			Gold: 47.78k Turrets: 9 Lord(s): 2 Turtle(s): 3 Blue Buff: 9 Orange Buff: 8	
		Gold: 75.08k Turrets: 7 Lord(s): 1  Turtle(s): 0 Blue Buff: 16  Orange Buff: 14	Game 5; 26:42; ONIC 13 - 15 TLPH; Team Liquid PH leads the series, 3–2			Gold: 69.73k Turrets: 7 Lord(s): 2 Turtle(s): 3 Blue Buff: 11 Orange Buff: 12	
		Gold: 47.72k Turrets: 7 Lord(s): 1  Turtle(s): 3 Blue Buff: 10  Orange Buff: 8	Game 6; 14:00; ONIC 20 - 8 TLPH; Series tied, 3–3			Gold: 39.29k Turrets: 2 Lord(s): 1 Turtle(s): 0 Blue Buff: 4 Orange Buff: 5	
		Match Results were not revealed	Game 7; 14:00; ONIC 6 - 13 TLPH; Team Liquid PH wins the series, 4–3			Match Results were not revealed	

=== Bracket ===
Play-In Round (Best-of-5)
3	ONIC PH	3
6	Twisted Minds PH	2
4	Team Falcons PH	3
5	TNC Pro Team	2

Upper Bracket Semifinals (Best-of-5)
2	Aurora	2
3	ONIC PH	3
1	Team Liquid PH	3
4	Team Falcons PH	2
Lower Bracket Semifinals (Best-of-5)
2	Aurora	0
4	Team Falcons PH	3

Upper Bracket Finals (Best-of-5)
3	ONIC PH	3
1	Team Liquid PH	0
Lower Bracket Finals (Best-of-7)
1	Team Liquid PH	4
4	Team Falcons PH	2

Grand Finals (Best-of-7)
3	ONIC Philippines	3
1	Team Liquid PH	4

=== MDL Philippines Season 5 ===
Coinciding with the professional league, MDL Philippines is occurring the same time frame. MDL Philippines' fifth season includes all eight franchise MDL teams alongside four qualifying local teams.

For Season 5, MDL Philippines has invited one team and has openly qualified seven other amateur teams from across the country, making the total number of participating teams for this season at 12, the largest pool of teams in MDL Philippines thus far.

==== Regular season ====
Each team will be put into four different groups. Based on their seeds on their group finish, they will be put in another group for a seeding match for the play-in bracket. Only four teams will qualify for the playoffs for Season 5.

Group A

Pos	Team	Pld	W	D	L	GF	GA	GD	Pts	Qualification
1	AP.Bren Hornets (Q)	3	2	1	0	5	1	+4	3	1st to 4th Seed
2	Martial Mayhem (Q)	3	0	3	0	3	3	0	3	5th to 8th Seed
3	Aurora Hunters (Q)	3	0	2	1	2	4	−2	2	9th to 12th Seed
4	Uncle Drew x Gamerpact Ascend (Q)	3	0	2	1	2	4	−2	2	13th to 16th Seed

Updated to match(es) played on April 16, 2025. Source:
(Q) Qualified for the phase indicated

Group B

Pos	Team	Pld	W	D	L	GF	GA	GD	Pts	Qualification
1	Team Liquid PH Academy (Q)	3	3	0	0	6	0	+6	3	1st to 4th Seed
2	Karibok Heroes (Q)	3	1	1	1	3	3	0	2	5th to 8th Seed
3	Flair Esports (Q)	3	0	2	1	2	4	−2	2	9th to 12th Seed
4	TNC Neo (Q)	3	0	1	2	1	5	−4	1	13th to 16th Seed

Updated to match(es) played on April 16, 2025. Source:
(Q) Qualified for the phase indicated

Group C

Pos	Team	Pld	W	D	L	GF	GA	GD	Pts	Qualification
1	Team Falcons Academy (Q)	3	2	1	0	5	1	+4	3	1st to 4th Seed
2	RRQ Kaito (Q)	3	2	0	1	4	2	+2	2	5th to 8th Seed
3	METACORE x CRIMSON (Q)	3	0	2	1	2	4	−2	2	9th to 12th Seed
4	Twisted Rising (Q)	3	0	1	2	1	5	−4	1	13th to 16th Seed

Updated to match(es) played on April 16, 2025. Source:
(Q) Qualified for the phase indicated
Group D

Pos	Team	Pld	W	D	L	GF	GA	GD	Pts	Qualification
1	Omega Neos (Q)	3	2	1	0	5	1	+4	3	1st to 4th Seed
2	ONIC Arsenals (Q)	3	2	1	0	5	1	+4	3	5th to 8th Seed
3	Minerva Esports (Q)	3	1	0	2	2	4	−2	1	9th to 12th Seed
4	Gods of Edith (Q)	3	0	0	3	0	6	−6	0	13th to 16th Seed

Updated to match(es) played on April 16, 2025. Source:
(Q) Qualified for the phase indicated

==== Play-in Tournament ====
1st to 4th Seed

Pos	Team	Pld	W	L	GF	GA	GD	Pts	Qualification
1	Omega Neos (Q)	2	2	0	4	0	+4	2	1st Seed
2	Team Liquid Academy PH (Q)	3	2	1	4	3	+1	2	2nd Seed
3	AP.Bren Hornets (Q)	3	1	2	3	4	−1	1	3rd Seed
4	Team Falcons Academy (Q)	2	0	2	0	4	−4	0	4th Seed

Updated to match(es) played on April 16, 2025. Source:
(Q) Qualified for the phase indicated

5th to 8th Seed

Pos	Team	Pld	W	L	GF	GA	GD	Pts	Qualification
1	ONIC Arsenals (Q)	2	2	0	4	1	+3	2	5th Seed
2	RRQ Kaito (Q)	3	2	1	5	2	+3	2	6th Seed
3	Karibok Heroes (Q)	3	1	2	2	4	−2	1	7th Seed
4	Martial Mayhem (Q)	2	0	2	0	4	−4	0	8th Seed

Updated to match(es) played on April 16, 2025. Source:
(Q) Qualified for the phase indicated

9th to 12th Seed

Pos	Team	Pld	W	L	GF	GA	GD	Pts	Qualification
1	Minevra Esports (Q)	2	2	0	4	0	+4	2	9th Seed
2	Aurora Hunters (Q)	3	2	1	4	3	+1	2	10th Seed
3	METACORE x CRIMSON (Q)	3	1	2	2	4	−2	1	11th Seed
4	Flair Esports (Q)	2	0	2	1	4	−3	0	12th Seed

Updated to match(es) played on April 16, 2025. Source:
(Q) Qualified for the phase indicated

13th to 16th Seed

Pos	Team	Pld	W	L	GF	GA	GD	Pts	Qualification
1	Uncle Drew X Gamerpact Ascend (Q)	2	2	0	4	1	+3	2	13th Seed
2	Twisted Rising (Q)	3	2	1	4	2	+2	2	14th Seed
3	TNC Neo (Q)	3	1	2	3	4	−1	1	15th Seed
4	Gods of Edith (Q)	2	0	2	0	4	−4	0	16th Seed

Updated to match(es) played on April 16, 2025. Source:
(Q) Qualified for the phase indicated

=== Playoffs ===
Round 1 (Best-of-3)
1	Omega Neos	2
16	Gods of Edith	0
8	Martial Mayhem	2
9	Minerva Esports	0
4	Team Falcons Academy	0
13	Uncle Drew x Gamerpact Ascend	2
5	ONIC Arsenals	2
12	Flair Esports	0
6	RRQ Kaito	2
11	METACORE x CRIMSON	0
3	AP.Bren Hornets	2
14	Twisted Rising	1
7	Karibok Esports	1
10	Aurora Hunters	2
2	Team Liquid PH Academy	0
15	TNC Neo	2

Quarterfinals (Best-of-5)
1	Omega Neos	3
8	Martial Mayhem	0
13	Uncle Drew x Gamerpact Ascend	1
5	ONIC Arsenals	3
6	RRQ Kaito	3
3	AP.Bren Hornets	0
10	Aurora Hunters	3
15	TNC Neo	2

Semifinals (Best-of-7)
1	Omega Neos	2
5	ONIC Arsenals	4
6	RRQ Kaito	3
10	Aurora Hunters	4

Grand Finals (Best-of-7)
5	ONIC Arsenals	4
10	Aurora Hunters	1

== Split 2 ==
=== MPL Philippines Season 16 ===
MPL Philippines Season 16
- League: MPL Philippines
- Sport: Esports
- Duration: August 22 - October 26, 2025
- Teams: 8

Regular Season
- Top seed: Aurora Gaming
- Season MVP: Dylan Aaron "Light" Catipon

Playoffs
- Upper Bracket champions: Aurora Gaming
- Lower Bracket champions: Team Liquid PH
- Lower Bracket runners-up: TNC Pro Team
- Finals venue: Cuneta Astrodome
- Finals champions: Team Liquid PH
- Runners-up: Aurora Gaming
- Finals MVP: Jaypee "Jaypee" Dela Cruz

Seasons
- ← S15 S17 →

MPL Philippines Season 16 was the sixteenth iteration of the Mobile Legends: Bang Bang Professional League based in the Philippines. Season 16 is the equivalent to the summer split in other regions and the regional qualifiers for the Philippines in the upcoming MLBB M7 World Championship. With details to be announced for both MPL Philippines and M7, the sixteenth season will feature the same eight franchise teams from Season 15.

Team Liquid PH enters Season 16 as the defending MPL Philippines champions and MSC 2025 champions, defeating then-defending champions ONIC Philippines in seven games during the Season 15 grand finals and defeating then-defending champions Selangor Red Giants OG Esports in five games. Team Liquid PH makes history as the first team since Blacklist International to become back-to-back champions and enters the world championship as both the defending MPL Philippines champions and MSC champions.

==== Offseason ====
Retirement

- Renejay "Renejay" Barcase, Tristan "Yawi" Cabrera, John Paul "H2WO" Salonga, and Setsuna "AkoSiDogie" Ignacio have officially retired and left the Mobile Legends: Bang Bang esports scene. The four would unite with Oscar "Sumpak" Romero to join MLBB's rival in the mobile gaming scene Honor of Kings.

International Transfers

- Salvick "Kouzen" Toralba leaves TNC Pro Team and joins Cambodian team PRO Esports.
- Dylan "Light" Catipon returns to MPL Philippines and joins Aurora Gaming. Catipon played one season with Bigetron by Vitality and previously played for TNC Pro Team, Z4 Esports, and RSG Philippines.
- Nowee "Ryota" Macasa returns to MPL Philippines and joins ONIC Philippines. Macasa played one season with ONIC Esports in MPL Indonesia and previously played for Playbook Esports, ONIC Philippines, Smart Omega, and Omega Neos.
- Patrick "E2MAX" Caidic returns to MPL Philippines and joins TNC Pro Team as their head coach. Caidic was the head coach for one season for Bigetron by Vitality. Caidic is a retired pro player for Execration, ArkAngel, and Smart Omega.
- Joshua "Ch4knu" Mangilog joins TNC Pro Team. Mangilog has been the longtime roamer of Smart Omega and previously played for Execration and Omega Neos.
- Robert "Hito" Candoy joins TNC Pro Team. Candoy was an inactive player for Smart Omega, Team Haq, Team Lunatix, and ONIC Arsenals. He will be the sixth man of TNC Pro Team.
- Kenneth "Nets" Barro returns to MPL Philippines and joins Smart Omega. Barro played for three seasons with Team Vamos and previously played for ONIC Philippines and HomeBois.
- Dean "Raizen" Sumagui returns to MPL Philippines and returns Smart Omega. Sumagui played for one season with See You Soon and previously played for ONIC Philippines, TNC Pro Team, and Team Falcons MENA.

Domestic Transfers

- Imam "Hadji" Salic leaves Twisted Minds PH and joins Smart Omega. Salic left after one season with Twisted Minds PH. He also played for EVOS Esports PH and Blacklist International.
- Arvie "Aqua" Antonio returned to MPL Philippines from inactivity and joins AP Bren. Antonio previously played for Blacklist International, Cignal Ultra and RSG Philippines.
- Vincent "Pandora" Unigo has left Team Falcons PH.
- Longtime caster Chantelle "Chantelle" Hernandez parts ways with MPL Philippines after seven years. Hernandez was one of the four original Filipino casters during MPL Philippines Season 8. No other casters from the said season have remained.

Mid Season Transfers

- Hans "Wurahhh" Solano leaves Geek Fam ID in the middle of the season and returns to MPL Philippines to join Smart Omega. Solano previously served as Geek Fam's assistant and head coach in his career. He also served as the former assistant head coach of ONIC Philippines, and the Head Coach of Bigetron Alpha.
- Robert "Hito" Candoy transitions from his sixth man role to the coaching staff. Candoy was transferred following head coach E2MAX's one-game absence.
- MDL Philippines player Vinjaz from TNC x Voltes PH was promoted to MPL Philippines in replacement to Candoy.
- Team Liquid Female coach Mohammad "Coach Moody" Samal has been appointed as Assistant Coach for Team Falcons PH after Week 4.

=== Regular season ===
==== Rosters ====
Denotes that the player/coach has been with the team since last season.
Denotes that the player/coach is a new addition to the roster.
Denotes that the player/coach is a new addition to the roster during the Middle of the Season.
Denotes that the player/coach changed their role.
Denotes that the team is the defending champion.

Team/Lane	AP Bren	Aurora Gaming	ONIC Philippines	Omega Esports	Team Falcons	Team Liquid PH	Twisted Minds	TNC Pro Team
Manager	Adi	Rada	—	Rianne	Ren Vitug	Mitch	Lexie	Scholar
Head Coach	Jeff	Master the Basics	YnoT	Lembot	Trebor / Ducky	Ar Sy	BON CHAN	E2MAX
Assistant Coach	Bom	Dex Star	Haze	Wurahhhh	Coach Moody	Tictac	ESON	FindingHito
Exp Lane	Lord JM	Edward	Kirk	Jeymz	FlapTzy	Sanford	Lansu	3MarTzy
Jungle	Jamespangks.	Demonkite	K1NGKONG	Raizen	KyleTzy	KarlTzy	MP the King	Zaida
Mid Lane	Aqua	Yue	Super Frince	Hadji	Phewww	Sanji	Sionnn	LanceCy
Gold Lane	Shizou	Domengkite	Kelra	Netskie	Super Marco	Oheb	Nosia	Bennyqt
Roamer	xNova	Light	Brusko	SUPER YOSHI	Owgwen	Jaypee	Caloy	Ch4knu
Sixth Man	Chovskrt	Calad	Ryota/Hate	Peuder	Ferdz	Perkz	Sensui	Vinjaz

=== Standings ===
Pos	Team	Pld	W	L	GF	GA	GD	Pts	Qualification
1	Aurora Gaming	14	13	1	26	10	+16	13	Season's First Seed
2	ONIC Philippines	14	9	5	22	13	+9	9	Qualified for the Playoffs
3	Team Liquid PH	14	9	5	21	12	+9	9	Qualified for the Playoffs
4	Twisted Minds PH	14	6	8	16	20	−4	6	Qualified for the Playoffs
5	TNC Pro Team	14	5	9	17	20	−3	5	Qualified for the Playoffs
6	Team Falcons PH	14	5	9	15	21	−6	5	Qualified for the Playoffs
7	Smart Omega	14	5	9	14	21	−7	5	Eliminated from Playoff Contention
8	AP.Bren	14	4	10	11	23	−12	4	Eliminated from Playoff Contention

Updated to match(es) played on September 29, 2025. Source:

=== Playoffs ===
==== #3 Team Liquid PH vs. #6 Team Falcons PH ====
The MSC defending champions, Team Liquid PH (TLPH) (9-5), faced the former M5 World Champions roster, Team Falcons PH (5-9). TLPH took a commanding 2-0 lead before Falcons secured a single game, but TLPH ultimately closed the series 3-1, advancing to the Upper Bracket Semifinals to meet ONIC Philippines.

#4 Twisted Minds PH vs. #5 TNC Pro Team

The fourth seed Twisted Minds PH (6-8) met the fifth seed TNC Pro Team (5-9). This was the second-consecutive playoff appearance for both teams and their first play-in bracket clash. TNC took the lead multiple times, reaching match point first, but Twisted Minds equalized the series to force the playoffs' first Game 5. TNC Pro Team won the decisive game, advancing to the Upper Bracket Semifinals.

==== Upper Bracket Semifinals ====
#2 ONIC Philippines vs. #3 Team Liquid PH

A rematch of the previous season's Grand Finals, this series saw TLPH sweep the defending M6 world champions, ONIC PH, 3-0. This was the only sweep of the playoff bracket. TLPH, whose roster included four world champions, advanced to their second-consecutive Upper Bracket Finals.

#1 Aurora Gaming vs. #5 TNC Pro Team

The dominant first seed Aurora Gaming (13-1), who were on an undefeated win streak, faced the underdog fifth seed TNC Pro Team. Despite expectations of a clear 3-0 or 3-1 victory for Aurora, TNC forced a pivotal Game 5. Aurora secured the win, 3-2, maintaining their undefeated streak and advancing to the Upper Bracket Finals.

==== Upper Bracket Finals ====
#1 Aurora Gaming vs. #3 Team Liquid PH

The finalists of Season 14 and the champions of the previous season (Season 15) met. The series featured a notable matchup between former teammates, as Edward and Yue of Aurora Gaming had previously played with Team Liquid PH's Oheb under Blacklist International. Aurora Gaming defeated TLPH 3-1, securing the first MLBB M7 World Championship seed for the Philippines and their second-consecutive world championship appearance. This series also marked Edward "Edward" Dapadap's unprecedented fifth-consecutive world championship appearance (M3 win, M4 second place, M5 third place, and a M6 appearance).

==== Lower Bracket Semifinals ====
#2 ONIC Philippines vs. #5 TNC Pro Team

This highly viewed Bo5 series showcased disciplined and aggressive playstyles from both teams. TNC Pro Team reached match point first at 2-1, but ONIC PH tied the series in Game 4, pushing TNC to their third-consecutive Game 5. In the final game, TNC executed a swift victory in thirteen minutes, securing neutral objectives and pushing both sidelanes. This victory ended the defending world champions' back-to-back campaign and sent TNC to the Lower Bracket Finals for the first time since Season 9.

==== Lower Bracket Finals ====
#3 Team Liquid PH vs. #5 TNC Pro Team

The first Best-of-Seven (Bo7) series of the playoffs. Team Liquid PH dominated the match, successfully exploiting the veteran roster of TNC Pro Team, despite TNC securing a Game 2 win to temporarily equalize the series 1-1. Team Liquid PH won the series 4-1, ending TNC Pro Team's deep underdog run. TNC earned the moniker "lason" (poison) from the community due to their unexpected and meteoric performance in the playoffs. TLPH advanced to the Grand Finals and to the MLBB M7 World Championship, one match away from a back-to-back championship and the coveted "Golden Road" or "Golden Stampede" achievement.

Playoff Bracket

Play-in Tournament (Best-of-5)
3	Team Liquid PH	3
6	Team Falcons	1
4	Twisted Minds PH	2
5	TNC Pro Team	3

Upper Bracket Semifinals (Best-of-5)
2	ONIC Philippines	0
3	Team Liquid PH	3
1	Aurora	3
5	TNC Pro Team	2
Lower Bracket Semifinals (Best-of-5)
2	ONIC Philippines	2
5	TNC Pro Team	3

Upper Bracket Finals (Best-of-5)
3	Team Liquid PH	1
1	Aurora	3
Lower Bracket Finals (Best-of-7)
3	Team Liquid PH	4
5	TNC Pro Team	1

Grand Finals (Best-of-7)
1	Aurora	0
3	Team Liquid PH	4

=== MDL Philippines Season 6 ===
==== Regular season ====
Similarly to Season 5, MDL Philippines Season 6 follows a Win-Draw-Loss system for their regular season with respective seedings being distributed on the second phase of the tournament. It will then lead to the Seeding phase where every team will play a GSL Format bracket to determine their seedings and similar to Season 5, their play-in and playoff bracket will be the same nature.

Group A

Pos	Team	Pld	W	D	L	GF	GA	GD	Pts
1	AP.Bren x Rough World Era	3	3	0	0	6	0	+6	3
2	KNN Main	2	1	1	0	3	3	0	2
3	NOVUS Braveharts	3	1	1	1	3	3	0	2
4	Twisted Minds Bear	3	0	0	3	0	6	−6	0

Updated to match(es) played on August 22, 2025. Source:

Group B

Pos	Team	Pld	W	D	L	GF	GA	GD	Pts
1	Uncle Drew X Gamerpact	3	2	1	0	5	1	+4	3
2	Team Liquid Academy PH	3	2	1	0	5	1	+4	3
3	H-Rock Prime	3	1	0	2	2	4	−2	1
4	Team Falcons Academy PH	3	0	0	3	0	6	−6	0

Updated to match(es) played on August 22, 2025. Source:

Group C

Pos	Team	Pld	W	D	L	GF	GA	GD	Pts
1	Aurora Hunters	3	1	2	0	4	2	+2	3
2	Martial Mayhem	3	1	2	0	4	2	+2	3
3	ORVZ Esports	3	0	3	0	3	3	0	3
4	ONIC x Minerva	3	0	1	2	1	5	−4	1

Updated to match(es) played on August 22, 2025. Source:

Group D

Pos	Team	Pld	W	D	L	GF	GA	GD	Pts
1	RRQ Kaito	3	2	1	0	5	1	+4	3
2	TNC x Voltes PH	3	1	2	0	4	2	+2	3
3	Crimson Esports	3	1	1	1	3	3	0	2
4	Flair Esports	3	0	0	3	0	6	−6	0

Updated to match(es) played on August 22, 2025. Source:

==== Seedings ====
Unlike Season 5, MDL Philippines Season 6 adhered to the GSL Format, a bracket-style seeding method that would determine who would become the first to fourth seeds. The team who qualified through the upper bracket will become the first seed, the team who qualified in the lower bracket will become the second seed, and those who lost in the second round of elimination will become the third seed while the first elimination losers will become the fourth seed.

Group A Seeding

Upper Bracket Semifinals (Best-of-3)
Uncle Drew x Gamerpact	0
AP Bren x World Rough Era	2
RRQ Kaito	2
Aurora Hunters	0
Battle for Seed 3 (Best-of-3)
Uncle Drew x Gamerpact	2
Aurora Hunters	1

Battle for Seed 1 (Best-of-3)
AP Bren x World Rough Era	2
RRQ Kaito	0
Battle for Seed 2 (Best-of-3)
RRQ Kaito	2
Uncle Drew x Gamerpact	0

Seed 1
AP Bren x World Rough Era
Seed 2
RRQ Kaito

Group B Seeding

Upper Bracket Semifinals (Best-of-3)
Team Liquid PH Academy	2
TNC x Voltes PH	1
Novus Bravehearts	2
Martial Mayhem	1
Battle for Seed 3 (Best-of-3)
TNC x Voltes PH	1
Martial Mayhem	2

Battle for Seed 1 (Best-of-3)
Team Liquid PH Academy	2
Novus Bravehearts	0
Battle for Seed 2 (Best-of-3)
Novus Bravehearts	1
Martial Mayhem	2

Seed 1
Team Liquid PH Academy
Seed 2
Martial Mayhem

Group C Seeding

Upper Bracket Semifinals (Best-of-3)
ORVZ Esports	1
Crimson Esports	2
H-Rock Prime	2
KNN x Explicit Esports	1
Battle for Seed 3 (Best-of-3)
ORVZ Esports	2
KNN x Explicit Esports	0

Battle for Seed 1 (Best-of-3)
Crimson Esports	2
H-Rock Prime	1
Battle for Seed 2 (Best-of-3)
H-Rock Prime	0
ORVZ Prime	2

Seed 1
Crimson Esports
Seed 2
ORVZ Prime

Group D Seeding

Upper Bracket Semifinals (Best-of-3)
ONIC x Minerva	2
Flair Esports	0
Team Falcons Academy	2
Twisted Minds Blacklist	0
Battle for Seed 3 (Best-of-3)
Flair Esports	2
Twisted Minds Blacklist	1

Battle for Seed 1 (Best-of-3)
ONIC x Minerva	2
Team Falcons Academy	0
Battle for Seed 2 (Best-of-3)
Team Falcons Academy	0
Flair Esports	2

Seed 1
ONIC x Minerva
Seed 2
Flair Esports

==== Playoffs ====
Similarly to the previous season, the play-in tournament will be used with four teams to qualify for playoffs. The seeding bracket determined the matchups per best-of-three matchup for Round 1.

Play-in Tournament (Best-of-3)
A1	AP Bren x Rough World Era	2
D4	Twisted Minds Blacklist	0
B4	TNC x Voltes PH	2
C1	Crimson Esports	1
A4	Aurora Hunters	2
C2	H-Rock Prime	0
B1	Team Liquid PH Academy	2
C4	KNN x Explicit Esports	0
B3	Martial Mayhem	2
B1	ONIC x Minerva	0
A3	Uncle Drew x Gamerpact	2
D2	Flair Esports	0
B3	Novus Bravehearts	1
C2	ORVZ Esports	2
A2	RRQ Kaito	2
D3	Team Falcons Academy	0

Quarterfinals (Best-of-5)
A1	AP Bren x Rough World Era	3
B4	TNC x Voltes PH	0
B2	Aurora Hunters	3
B1	Team Liquid PH Academy	1
A4	Martial Mayhem	1
A3	Uncle Drew x Gamerpact	3
C2	ORVZ Esports	1
A2	RRQ Kaito	3

Semifinals (Best-of-7)
A1	AP Bren x Rough World Era	4
B2	Aurora Hunters	1
A3	Uncle Drew x Gamerpact	3
A2	RRQ Kaito	4

Grand Finals (Best-of-7)
A1	AP Bren x Rough World Era	4
A2	RRQ Kaito	2

== Other Events ==
=== ESL Snapdragon Pro Series ===
The ESL Snapdragon Pro Series for Mobile Legends: Bang Bang began during the offseason of MPL Philippines Seasons 15 and 16. The tournament is on its sixth season split into three different tournament levels: The Open Finals, the Challenge Season, and the Challenge Finals with the finale being the ESL Snapdragon Pro Series Masters, in Jakarta. Both amateur and professional teams from MPL Philippines competed in these tournaments.

==== Season 6: Open Finals ====
In the Open Finals, three professional squads competed for a slot in the challenge season: Aurora Gaming, Omega Esports (stylized as Smart Omega), and ONIC Philippines, and four amateur squads: Gamerpact Ascend, Gamerpact Chiefs, Lazy Esports, and RRQ Kaito. The seven representatives played a Best-of-3 Swiss-stage tournament with the top four teams qualifying for the challenge season. Indonesia's Alter Ego and the Philippines' Aurora Gaming both went unscathed in the Swiss stage, going on a perfect 4–0 record while ONIC Philippines had a 5–1 record, dropping only one series to Indonesia's RRQ Hoshi who subsequently qualified as the eight seed. Among the seven representatives, three of them qualified for the Challenge Season.

==== Season 6: Challenge Season ====
The Challenge season featured the eight qualifying teams from the Open Final and eight invited teams from the Philippines, Indonesia, Malaysia, and Singapore. All teams were split into four groups with the top two advancing to the Challenge Finals. Among the four Philippine representatives, two teams qualified for the Challenge Finals in ONIC Philippines—who went undefeated in their group—and Aurora Gaming—who only lost two games in their Best of 3 matches.

==== Season 6: Challenge Finals ====
The Challenge Finals was the third phase of the Snapdragon Pro Series held in February 2025. One team from six different regions were invited by ESL to compete with the six qualifying teams from the Challenge Season. The Philippines had three representatives in the Challenge Finals in ONIC Philippines, Aurora Gaming, and the debutant Team Falcons PH. Among the Philippines' representatives, Team Falcons PH and ONIC Philippines qualified for the ESL Snapdragon Masters with FCON placing fourth and ONIC Philippines in the deciding Grand Finals match against sister team ONIC Esports. ONIC Philippines swept their sister team ONIC Esports to claim the Challenge Finals trophy and a shot at Masters in the middle of the split.

==== Mobile Masters 2025 ====
The Snapdragon Mobile Masters 2025 was an international tournament held by ESL Snapdragon Pro Series. It was the last iteration of that year's ESL Snapdragon Pro Series competition and is similar to that of the Master's Tours Championship. ONIC Philippines qualified for the Mobile Masters as the champions of the Challenge Finals. In the group stage, ONIC Philippines had an equal-best record with Indonesian team RRQ Hoshi but RRQ edged them out by just one game. ONIC had a 5–0; 10-1 standing while RRQ had a perfect 5–0; 10–0 record.

Both teams would meet in the Grand Finals and ONIC Philippines won the series in 5 games.

==== Mobile Legends: Bang Bang Women's Invitational ====
The second iteration of the women's division for Mobile Legends: Bang Bang in the 2025 Esports World Cup will be held again coinciding with MSC 2025—the men's division. Teams from the Philippines qualified through the Athena League which served as the first official female tournament for MLBB for the female division and the qualifying tournament for Philippine teams to EWC.

In the Athena League, defending MWI champions Omega Empress—the women's division for Smart Omega—was acquired by Natus Vincere midway through the Athena League. This comes after NAVI's own entry to both MLBB in Indonesia and Malaysia. NAVI PH was swept by North American representatives Gaimin Gladiators during the quarterfinals while Team Liquid were swept by Burmese representatives Terror Queens for the third-placer match. This is the Philippines' worst team placement in the MWI tied with Risk Velkhana's fourth-placement in MWI 2023.

=== Team SIBOL ===
==== IESF World Championship ====
The National Team selection for the International Esports Federation World Championships or the IESF World Championships occurred during the first split of the 2025 competitive year on April 21 to April 23, 2025. A total of ten teams qualified to the national team selection, one being the NU Bulldogs. Team Falcons PH would win in a best-of-five series against Team Liquid PH and the Team Falcons PH roster qualified for the IESF World Championships. However, two substitutes were picked from TLPH and ONIC Philippines that being Grant "Kelra" Pillas and Sanford "Sanford" Vinuya. However, the team would fail to qualify for the IESF World Championships, losing 2-0 to the eventual combine champions Cambodia and losing in the third-place match against Myanmar.

==== Southeast Asian Games ====
The National Team selection for the 2025 SEA Games was held from June 25 to June 27, 2025 as part of the National Team Selection representing the Philippines for the MLBB eSports scene in the Southeast Asian Games in Thailand. Five professional teams and five amateur and MDL teams were invited to the tournament with Team Liquid PH besting Team Falcons in the Semifinals and besting MDL champions ONIC Nine Lives in the Grand Finals. The entire roster of TLPH would win the national team selection and adding on John Carlo "Caloy" Roma of Twisted Minds PH as a substitute.

== Awards ==
In every split, MPL Philippines announces awards for players across the league such as all star teams and the individual awards such as Regular Season MVP and Finals MVP.

=== Season 15 ===
Similarly to Season 14, 2 All-Star Teams will be awarded to ten different players from the five different lanes in-game while one All-Fan Vote team would also be announced. For the second-consecutive season, one team dominated the fan's all-star team.

=== Season 16 ===
Adopting similar awards from Season 15, the Rookie of the Season award was reintroduced following the influx of new rookies to the MPL Philippines stage. Twisted Minds PH's Sionnn won the award, the first rookie since Nomed from Season 14. ONIC Philippines would become the first team to go back-to-back domination for the fan's all-star team.

Award	Season 15			Season 16		
Award	Name	Role	Team	Name	Role	Team
Finals MVP	Alston "Sanji" Pabico	Mid Lane	Team Liquid PH	Jaypee "Jaypee" Dela Cruz	Roamer	Team Liquid PH
Regular Season MVP	Kiel Calvin "Oheb" Soriano	Gold Lane	Team Liquid PH	Dylan Aaron "Light" Catipon	Roamer	Aurora Gaming
Coaching Staff of the Season	Team Liquid Philippines (Rodel "Ar Sy" Cruz)			Aurora Gaming (Aniel "Master the Basics" Jiandani, Dexter "Dex Star" Alaba)		
Rookie of the Season	None			Miguel "Sionnn" Alcantara	Mid Lane	Twisted Minds PH
Most Improved Player	Lance "LanceCy" Cunanan	Mid Lane	TNC Pro Team	Jan "Domengkite" delmundo	Gold Lane	Aurora Gaming
All-Star First Team	Sanford "Sanford" Vinuya	Exp Lane	Team Liquid PH	Edward "Edward" Dapadap	Exp Lane	Aurora Gaming
All-Star First Team	Karl "KarlTzy" Nepomuceno	Jungle	Team Liquid PH	Karl "KarlTzy" Nepomuceno	Jungle	Team Liquid PH
All-Star First Team	Frince "Super Frince" Ramirez	Mid Lane	ONIC Philippines	Kenneth "Yue" Tadeo	Mid Lane	Aurora Gaming
All-Star First Team	Kiel Calvin "Oheb" Soriano	Gold Lane	Team Liquid PH	Jan "Domengkite" delmundo	Gold Lane	Aurora Gaming
All-Star First Team	Renejay "Renejay" Barcase	Roamer	Aurora Gaming	Dylan "Light" Catipon	Roamer	Aurora Gaming
All-Star Second Team	Edward "Edward" Dapadap	Exp Lane	Aurora Gaming	Sanford "Sanford" Vinuya	Exp Lane	Team Liquid PH
All-Star Second Team	King Cyric "K1NGKONG" Perez	Jungle	ONIC Philippines	Jonard "Demonkite" Caranto	Jungle	Aurora Gaming
All-Star Second Team	Kenneth "Yue" Tadeo	Mid Lane	Aurora Gaming	Frince "Super Frince" Ramirez	Mid Lane	ONIC Philippines
All-Star Second Team	Grant "Kelra" Pillas	Gold Lane	ONIC Philippines	Grant "Kelra" Pillas	Gold Lane	ONIC Philippines
All-Star Second Team	Borris "Brusko" Parro	Roamer	ONIC Philippines	Jaypee "Jaypee" Dela Cruz	Roamer	Team Liquid PH
Fan's All-Star Team	Jann "Kirk" Gutierrez	Exp Lane	ONIC Philippines	Jann "Kirk" Gutierrez	Exp Lane	ONIC Philippines
Fan's All-Star Team	King Cyric "K1NGKONG" Perez	Jungle	ONIC Philippines	King Cyric "K1NGKONG" Perez	Jungle	ONIC Philippines
Fan's All-Star Team	Frince "Super Frince" Ramirez	Mid Lane	ONIC Philippines	Frince "Super Frince" Ramirez	Mid Lane	ONIC Philippines
Fan's All-Star Team	Grant "Kelra" Pillas	Gold Lane	ONIC Philippines	Grant "Kelra" Pillas	Gold Lane	ONIC Philippines
Fan's All-Star Team	Borris "Brusko" Parro	Roamer	ONIC Philippines	Borris "Brusko" Parro	Roamer	ONIC Philippines

== Controversies ==
=== MPL Philippines Season 15 champions medals ===
Fans online—specifically on Facebook communities—have called out MPL Philippines for their "cheap" looking medals that were given to the champions Team Liquid PH. Previous iterations of these medals were hard metal-like medals that were evident during MPL PH Season 7 and MPL PH Season 8. However, during the Season 15 awarding ceremony for the champions, the medals were reportedly made out of acrylic or some type of plastic which caused dismay among fans and players alike. Players including Johnmar "OhMyV33Nus" Villaluna and Setsuna "AkoSiDogie" Ignacio publicly expressed dismay with fans calling out MPL Philippines for cheeping out on the medal.

=== MDL Philippines match fixing ===
The second incident to match fixing occurred when Twisted Minds' partnered team Bear Esports were exposed to match fixing games in return for profits on bets for or against the team. MDL Philippines conducted and concluded the internal report that Bear Esports players were the main perpetrators to the match fixing allegations. Twisted Minds effectively terminated their partnership and replaced them with Blacklist International with an all female lineup. This marks the first time that an all-female lineup will compete in MDL Philippines and the return of Blacklist International to MLBB.

== Others ==
=== MLBB Exodus ===
On July 2, 2025, Renejay Barcase, Tristan Cabrera, John Paul Salonga, and earlier Setsuna Ignacio—collectively known as the original members of the Nexplay EVOS Big Three and one of the most-influential streamers in the Philippines—has collectively departed its teams, organizations, and sponsors related to Mobile Legends: Bang Bang. Barcase, Cabrera, and Salonga in particular left their teams: Aurora Gaming, TNC Pro Team and Smart Omega, respectively. A day later, it was announced that the four of them alongside Oscar "Sumpak" Romero was joining Honor of Kings, the direct competitor of MLBB in the mobile scene. This is so far, the largest departure of star talents, players, and personalities from one game, following the lead of original casters Manjean Faldas, Shin Boo Ponferrada, Edgar "ChooxTV" Dumali and Mara Aquino.

Since 2024, many former personalities and content creators of MLBB have switched to Honor of Kings citing different reasons on why they've decided to transfer.

== See also ==
- 2024 MPL Philippines season
- MPL Indonesia
- Mid-Season Cup 2024
- Team Falcons
- Mid-Season Cup 2025
- MLBB M7 World Championship
