= TNC Pro Team =

Professional Esports organization based in the Philippines

- Short name: TNC
- Divisions: Mobile Legends: Bang Bang
- Location: Southeast Asia
- Colors: Grenadier (Red)
- Manager: Dredd de Guzman
- Partners: Wonderlast; Big Four Globe Technologies Inc. Speeddepot

The TNC Pro Team, formerly known as TNC Gaming, is a Southeast Asian professional esports organization owned by TheNet.Com, a chain of internet cafes in the Philippines. The team was established in 2013 with its Dota 2 team, which gained notability after their upset win against OG in The International 2016.

In 2021, TNC enetered Mobile Legends: Bang Bang team with a franchised team in MPL Philippines, acquiring the roster of Work Auster Force. To date, TNC's MLBB team is the only active division.

== Dota 2 ==
In 2016, TNC qualified for that year's The International as the top team in the Southeast Asia region. During the tournament, the team faced against tournament favorites OG in the second round of the lower bracket. TNC ended up sweeping OG in two games of the best-of-three series, with the upset later being known as the Miracle of TI6.

== Mobile Legends: Bang Bang ==
In season 7, the roots of the team started as Work Auster Force which consisted of Chuu, Unravel, Kousei, 3MarTzy, rTzy and Coach Lift. Despite being rookies, they gave a challenge to veteran teams dominating the MPL scene, which included Aura PH (now as ECHO Philippines), Blacklist International, Bren Esports (now as AP Bren), Cignal Ultra, Execration, Laus Playbook, Nexplay Esports (now as Nexplay EVOS), Smart Omega and Onic PH. They only placed 5th-6th in the Playoffs but they left a deep impression on the competitive scene.

In season 8, TNC formally announced their entry into the Mobile Legends: Bang Bang (MLBB) competitive scene and partnership with Work Auster Force to join the MLBB Professional League (MPL) for its upcoming eighth season. Six players from that Work Auster Force squad namely Frediemar “3MarTzy” Serafico, Daniel “Chuuu” Chu, Clarense “Kousei” Camilo, Dylan "Light" Catipon, Patrick "P-GOD" Ibarra, and coach John "Lift" Ruiz will headline TNC's ten-man roster for MPL PH Season 8, the TNC Pro Team ML is set to be joined by former Cignal Ultra player Douglas “ImbaDeejay” Astibe and former Smart Omega player Adrian “Toshi” Bacallo. Completing the roster are rookies Ben “Benthings” Maglaque and Lander “Der” San Gabriel.

After a disastrous Season 8, TNC Pro-Team ML will parade its new head coach for MPL Philippines Season 9 in Coach Vrendon “Vrendon” Lin, The only two veterans that remain were Ben Seloe Dizon “Benthings” Maglaque and Shemaiah Daniel “SDZYZ” Chu (formerly Chuuu).The newest members of the teams consists of Jomarie “Escalera” Delos Santos, Mark Genzon “Kramm” Rusiana, Robee “Yasuwo” Bryan, and KingSalman. They tried to grind their way in the qualifiers in previous MPL seasons, only for them to get themselves trounced.

TNC Pro Team improve their game and they become a second seed of the regular season, they through to the upper bracket finals of the MPL Philippines Season 9 Playoffs after they defeated Smart Omega Esports Philippines, 3–1, in the semifinals. Afortunately Smart Omega Esports Philippines soundly swept TNC Pro Team 3–0 in the lower bracket finals Playoffs to secure the final spot in the grand finals, where they will challenge RSG Philippines for the championship.

== Tournament Results ==
=== MLBB Professional League : Philippines ===
| Year | Season | Known as | Place | Last match | Result |
|---|---|---|---|---|---|
| 2021 | MPL Philippines Season 7 | Work Auster Force | 5th–8th | Work Auster Force vs. Bren Esports | 1–3 |
| 2021 | MPL Philippines Season 8 | TNC Pro Team | 7th–8th | Omega Esports vs. TNC Pro Team | 0–2 |
| 2022 | MPL Philippines Season 9 | TNC Pro Team | 3rd | TNC Pro Team vs.Omega Esports | 0–3 |
| 2022 | MPL Philippines Season 10 | TNC Pro Team | 8th | TNC Pro Team vs.Blacklist International | 0–2 |
| 2023 | MPL Philippines Season 11 | TNC Pro Team | 8th | TNC Pro Team vs. Omega Esports | 0–2 |
| 2023 | MPL Philippines Season 12 | TNC Pro Team | 8th | TNC Pro Team vs. RSG Philippines | 2-1 |
| 2024 | MPL Philippines Season 13 | TNC Pro Team | 8th | TNC Pro Team vs. Omega Esports | 2-0 |
| 2024 | MPL Philippines Season 14 | TNC Pro Team | 8th | TNC Pro Team vs. Team Liquid PH | 1-2 |
| 2025 | MPL Philippines Season 15 | TNC Pro Team | 5th-6th | TNC Pro Team vs. Team Falcons PH | 2-3 |
| 2025 | MPL Philippines Season 16 | TNC Pro Team | 3rd | TNC Pro Team vs. Team Liquid PH | 1-4 |

=== Other Tournament Achievements ===
| Year | Series | Place | Last match | Result |
|---|---|---|---|---|
| 2021 | Juicy Legends Tournament 2021 Q3 Pro Division | 1st | TNC Pro Team vs. ArkAngel | 3–0 |
| 2023 | Juicy Legends Tournament 2023 Q2 Pro Division | 1st | TNC Pro Team vs. Minana Esports | 3–2 |

== Rosters ==
MPL Philippines Season 15 TNC Pro Team Mobile Legends: Bang Bang roster
Players
Coaches

| Role | Handle | Name | Nationality |
|---|---|---|---|
| Exp-Lane | Ryota | Nowee Macasa | Philippines |
| Jungler | Zaida | Justine Saida Palma | Philippines |
| Mid-Lane | Vinnn | Ervin Franco | Philippines |
| Gold Lane | Jowm | Jomari Pingol | Philippines |
| Roamer | Zehn | . | Philippines |
| Flex | Yeyenia | . | Philippines |

Head coach

Patrick "E2MAX" Caidic

Assistant coach(es)

Robert "Hito" Candoy

Legend:
- (I) Inactive
- (S) Suspended
- Substitute
- (injured) Injury / Illness
