= 2026 MPL Philippines season =

2026 season for professional and amateur tournaments for the Philippines

- League: MPL Philippines
- Sport: Esports
- Duration: Regular Season: March 20 – May 17, 2026 (S17); August 21 – October 11, 2026 (S18) Playoffs: May 27 – May 31, 2026 (S17); October 21 – October 25, 2026 (S18)
- Teams: 8

MPL Philippines Season 17
- Top seed: Team Liquid PH
- Season MVP: Karl Gabriel "KarlTzy" Nepomuceno (TLPH)

MPL Philippines Season 18
- Top seed: Team Liquid PH
- Season MVP: Jay pee "Jaypee" Dela Cruz (TLPH)

Grand Finals
- Venue: Filoil EcoOil Centre (S17); PhilSports Arena (S18)
- Champions: Team Liquid PH (S17); Aurora Gaming PH (S18)
- Runners-up: Team Falcons PH (S17 & S18)
- Finals MVP: Sanford "Sanford" Vinuya (S17); Jan Dominic "Domeng" Del mundo (S18)

Seasons
- 2025 2027

The 2026 MPL Philippines season is the ongoing ninth year of MPL Philippines' biannual competition format for the multiplayer online battle arena mobile game Mobile Legends: Bang Bang.

MPL Philippines Season 17 began with its regular season on March 20th and ending on May 17th and its playoffs occurring from May 27th until May 31st. Team Liquid PH made history as the first team to win a three-peat in MPL Philippines after their 4-2 win over Team Falcons PH. This makes Team Liquid PH and Team Falcons PH as the representatives of the Philippines to the Mid Season Cup 2026 in Paris.

MPL Philippines Season 18 began with its regular season on August 21, 2026 and ended with the Grand Finals on October 25, 2026. The second split of the year happened after the culmination of the Mid Season Cup 2026. Notably, Team Liquid PH nor Team Falcons PH won the MSC title and were not a part of the top three of the tournament. Defending champions Team Liquid PH was defeated in seven-games by Aurora Gaming PH in the lower bracket finals and subsequently, the team defeated Team Falcons PH in six games to win the Season 18 title.

== Split 1 (Season 17) ==
=== Rosters ===
Legend:
Player Transfer	Position/Role Change	Mid-Season Transfer	Position/Role Vacated	**Bold**	Team Captain	Italic	Import player/coach

Team	Roster							Staff			
Team	Exp	Jungler	Mid	Gold	Roamer	Substitute(s)		Manager	Head coach	Asst. coach	Analyst
AP Bren	**Kielvj**	Jamespangks	Aqua	Shizou	Nova	Chovskrt	—N/a	Adi	Giee	Bom	Vacant
Aurora Gaming PH	Edward	Demonkite	Yue	Domengkite	Light	Calad	—N/a	Rada	Master The Basics	Dex Star	Vacant
Onic Philippines	Kirk	K1NGKONG	**Super Frince**	Savero	Brusko	Ryota	—N/a	Vacant	Haze	Vacant	Bluffzy
Smart Omega	Jeymz	Raizen	Minguin	Netskie	Perkziva	Peuder	—N/a	Rianne	Wurahhhh	Lembot	Vacant
Team Falcons PH	Flap	Kyle	Hadji	Super Marco	Owgwen	Ferdz	—N/a	Vacant	Ducky	Moody	Vr3n
Team Liquid PH	Sanford	KarlTzy	**Sanji**	Teddy	Jaypee	Daiki	–	Mitch	Aeon	SN4P	Vacant
TNC Pro Team	3Mar	Zaida	LanceCy	Bennyqt	Ch4knu	Stown	—N/a	Dredd	E2MAX	FindingHito	Vacant
Twisted Minds PH	Lansu	MPtheKing	Sionnn	Noisa	Caloy	Owl	—N/a	Lexie	Bonchan	Eson	Vacant

==== Roster changes ====
Roster changes began after the conclusion of MPL Philippines Season 16 and majority of teams have either put their players and staff into the inactive roles or have released them for other teams. The most significant addition to Season 17 was the entry of Clayton "Savero" Kuswanto and initially Sultan "AeronShikii" Muhammad to Onic Philippines and Team Liquid PH, respectively. Both of them would've been the first two Indonesian imports playing for Filipino teams. Kuswanto would play for Onic for the entire season while Muhammad never played for Team Liquid PH due to visa issues.

Team	Move	Player	Role	Former Team	New Team	Notes	Ref.
AP Bren	Signed	Kiel Vj **"KielVj"** Cruzem	Exp Laner	DianFengYaoGuai	**AP Bren**		
AP Bren	Signed	Karl Luigi **"Coach Giee"** Barrientos	Head Coach	Influence Rage	**AP Bren**		
AP Bren	Released	Jhon Marl **"Lord JM"** Sebastian	Exp Laner	AP Bren	**VSG**		
AP Bren	Released	Jeffrey **"Jeff"** Manforte	Head Coach	AP Bren	**Team Flash**		
Smart Omega	Signed	Carl **"Minguin"** Gallantes	Mid Laner	RRQ Kaito	**Smart Omega**		
Smart Omega	Signed	John **"Perkz"** Sumawan	Roamer	Team Liquid PH	**Smart Omega**		
Smart Omega	Released	Imam **"Hadji"** Salic	Mid Laner	Smart Omega	**Team Falcons PH**		
Smart Omega	Released	Czedrick **"Super Yoshi"** Romero	Roamer	Smart Omega	**RRQ Tora**		
Team Falcons PH	Signed	Imam **"Hadji"** Salic	Mid Laner	Smart Omega	**Team Falcons PH**		
Team Falcons PH	Signed	Vrendom **"Vr3n"** Pesebre	Analyst	Team Spirit	**Team Falcons PH**		
Team Falcons PH	Loaned	Angelo Kyle **"Pheww"** Arcangel	Mid Laner	Team Falcons PH	**EVOS**		
Team Falcons PH	Inactive	Robert **"Trebor"** Sanchez	Coach	Team Falcons PH	Inactive	Not named head coach for the season	
Team Falcons PH	Signed	Francis **"Ducky"** Glindro	Head Coach	Team Falcons	**Team Falcons PH**	Former Team Falcons head coach; returned for Season 17	
Twisted Minds PH	Released	Stephen **"Sensui"** Castillo	Substitute	Twisted Minds PH	Free Agent		
Twisted Minds PH	Signed	Lee Howard **"Owl"** Gonzales	Substitute	Guangzhou Gaming	**Twisted Minds PH**		
Twisted Minds PH	Promoted	Damasco **"Tracy"** Danielle	Roamer	Twisted Minds Bear	**Twisted Minds PH**	Mid-season promotion from MDL squad	
Onic Philippines	Transfer	Grant Duane **"Kelra"** Pillas	Gold Laner	Onic Philippines	**Onic Esports**		
Onic Philippines	Transfer	Clayton **"Savero"** Kuswanto	Gold Laner	Onic Esports	**Onic Philippines**	First announced import to Onic Philippines	
Onic Philippines	Signed	Mark **"Bluffzy"** Reyes	Assistant Coach	Geek Fam	**Onic Philippines**		
Team Liquid PH	Signed	Sultan **"AeronShikii"** Muhammad	Gold Laner	Team Liquid	**AC Esports**	Released shortly after due to failure to secure a working visa	
Team Liquid PH	Promoted	Dave **"Teddy"** Viaña	Gold Laner	Team Liquid Academy	**Team Liquid PH**	Promoted from the team's MDL squad	
Team Liquid PH	Signed	Ventanilla **"Daiki"** Cruz	Analyst / Gold Laner	Team Liquid Academy	**Team Liquid PH**		
Team Liquid PH	Signed	Santi **"Santi"** Noble	Mid Laner	Team Liquid Academy	**Team Liquid PH**	Later demoted back to MDL following Teddy's promotion	
Team Liquid PH	Released	Rodel **"Ar Sy"** Cruz	Coach	Team Liquid PH	**AI Esports**		
Team Liquid PH	Released	Harrold **"Tictac"** Reyes	Coach	Team Liquid PH	Free Agent		
Team Liquid PH	Signed	Ong Wei **"Coach Aeon"** Sheng	Head Coach	Inactive (Note: Aeon was inactive from 2023 to 2026. He was formerly part of Team SMG SG.)	**Team Liquid PH**	First Singaporean head coach in MPL Philippines	
Team Liquid PH	Signed	Allec **"SN4P"** Alvarado	Assistant Coach	Smart mega	**Team Liquid PH**		
TNC Pro Team	Signed	Dale **"Stowm"** Vidor	Substitute	DXSoul Esports	**TNC Pro Team**		

=== Format ===
The regular season featured a double round-robin tournament, where each team played two best-of-three matches against all other teams for a total of seven matches. The top six teams advanced to the playoffs. In this case, Team Liquid PH, Team Falcons PH, Onic Philippines, Twisted Minds PH, and Aurora Gaming PH returned playoffs while Smart Omega qualified for playoffs for the first time since Season 14. Teams ranked third through sixth playeda single match to determine which teams join the top two in the double-elimination tournament. All matches were best-of-fives except for the lower bracket finals and grand finals at best-of-sevens. The two finalists will qualify for the 2026 Mobile Legends: Bang Bang Mid Season Cup in Paris, France.

=== Standings ===
Pos	Team	Pld	W	L	Pts	GW	GL	GD	Qualification	TLPH	FLCN	ONIC	OMGE	TWIS	RORA	APBR	TNCP
1	Team Liquid PH	14	13	1	13	27	6	+21	Secured Upper Bracket	—	1–2	2–0	2–0	2–0	2–1	2–1	2–0
2	Team Falcons PH	14	12	2	12	26	8	+18	Secured Upper Bracket	1–2	—	2–1	1–2	2–0	2–0	2–0	2–0
3	Onic Philippines	14	9	5	9	20	13	+7	Qualified for Playoffs	0–2	1–2	—	2–1	2–0	2–0	2–0	0–2
4	Smart Omega	14	6	8	6	15	19	−4	Qualified for Playoffs	0–2	0–2	0–2	—	2–0	1–2	2–1	2–0
5	Twisted Minds	14	6	8	6	13	20	−7	Qualified for Playoffs	0–2	0–2	1–2	2–1	—	0–2	2–0	2–1
6	Aurora Gaming PH	14	5	9	5	15	19	−4	Qualified for Playoffs	0–2	1–2	1–2	2–1	2–1	—	2–1	2–0
7	AP Bren	14	3	11	3	9	24	−15		1–2	0–2	0–2	2–0	0–2	0–2	—	2–1
8	TNC Pro Team	14	2	12	2	8	24	−16		0–2	0–2	0–2	0–2	1–2	2–0	1–2	—

Updated to match(es) played on May 17, 2026. Source: MPL Philippines

=== Teams of the Week ===
(†)	MVP of the Week

Week No.	Exp Lane	Jungler	Mid Lane	Gold Lane	Roamer
Week 1	Kiel Vj "**Kielvj**" Cruzem (†) (AP Bren)	James "**Jamespangks**." Mendoza (AP Bren)	Alston "**Sanji**" Pabico (Team Liquid PH)	Kim "**Daiki**." Sebanes (Team Liquid PH)	Denniel "**Nova**" Gomez (AP Bren)
Week 2	Sanford "**Sanford**" Vinuya (Team Liquid PH)	Karl Gabriel "**KarlTzy**" Nepomuceno (†) (Team Liquid PH)	Kenneth "**Yue**" Tadeo (Aurora Gaming)	Marco Stephen "**Super Marco**" Requitiano (Team Falcons PH)	Joshua "**Ch4knu**" Mangilog (TNC Pro Team)
Week 3	David Charles "**Flap**" Canon (Team Falcons PH)	Michael Angelo "**Kyle**" Sayson (Team Falcons PH)	Alston "**Sanji**" Pabico (Team Liquid PH)	Clayton Adrielo "**Savero**" Kuswanto (Onic Philippines)	Jaypee Gonzales "**Jaypee**" dela Cruz (†) (Team Liquid PH)
Week 4	David Charles "**Flap**" Canon (Team Falcons PH)	Michael Angelo "**Kyle**" Sayson (Team Falcons PH)	Salic Alauya "**Hadji**" Imam (Team Falcons PH)	Marco Stephen "**Super Marco**" Requitiano (†) (Team Falcons PH)	Rowgien Stimpson "**Owgwen**" Unigo (Team Falcons PH)
Week 5	Sanford "**Sanford**" Vinuya (Team Liquid PH)	Karl Gabriel "**KarlTzy**" Nepomuceno (†) (Team Liquid PH)	Alston "**Sanji**" Pabico (Team Liquid PH)	Dave "**Teddy**" Viaña (Team Liquid PH)	Jaypee Gonzales "**Jaypee**" dela Cruz (Team Liquid PH)
Week 6	James "**Jeymz**" Gloria (Smart Omega)	Michael Angelo "**Kyle**" Sayson (†) (Team Falcons PH)	Carl Edriel "**Minguin**" Gallantes (Smart Omega)	Kenneth Sablande "**Nets**" Barro (Smart Omega)	Damasco Tracy "**Tracy**" Danielle (Twisted Minds PH)
Week 7	Sanford "**Sanford**" Vinuya (Team Liquid PH)	Karl Gabriel "**KarlTzy**" Nepomuceno (†) (Team Liquid PH)	Frince Miguel "**Super Frince**" Ramirez (Onic Philippines)	Kenneth Sablande "**Nets**" Barro (Smart Omega)	Jaypee Gonzales "**Jaypee**" dela Cruz (Team Liquid PH)
Week 8	Lance Aaron "**Lansu**" Misa (Twisted Minds PH)	Karl Gabriel "**KarlTzy**" Nepomuceno (Team Liquid PH)	Frince Miguel "**Super Frince**" Ramirez (Onic Philippines)	Marco Stephen "**Super Marco**" Requitiano (†) (Team Falcons PH)	Jaypee Gonzales "**Jaypee**" dela Cruz (Team Liquid PH)

=== Playoffs ===
Season 17's playoffs was hosted at the Filoil EcoOil Centre in San Juan, Metro Manila, the site of the 2019 SEA Games' esports inception of Mobile Legends: Bang Bang into the biennial tournament. Smart Omega returned to the playoffs after back-to-back season misses since Season 15 while Team Liquid PH, Team Falcons PH, Onic Philippines, and Twisted Minds PH returned to the playoffs. TNC Pro Team finished 2-12 this season, affirming their elimination after their third-place finish last season.

Team Liquid PH makes history as the first organization in MPL Philippines history to achieve a three-peat. The organization now holds the most titles in MPL Philippines history with five and surpassing the number of appearances for an organization in a grand finals series with six.

**Play-In Round** (Best-of-5)
**3**	**Onic Philippines**	**3**
6	Aurora Gaming	2
**4**	**Smart Omega**	**3**
5	Twisted Minds	1

**Upper Bracket Semifinals** (Best-of-5)
2	Team Falcons PH	0
**3**	**Onic Philippines**	**3**
**1**	**Team Liquid PH**	**3**
4	Smart Omega	0
**Lower Bracket Semifinals** (Best-of-5)
**2**	**Team Falcons PH**	**3**
4	Smart Omega	1

**Upper Bracket Finals** (Best-of-5)
3	Onic Philippines	1
**1**	**Team Liquid PH**	**3**
**Lower Bracket Finals** (Best-of-7)
3	Onic Philippines	2
**2**	**Team Falcons PH**	**4**

**Grand Finals** (Best-of-7)
**1**	**Team Liquid PH**	**4**
2	Team Falcons PH	2

== Matches ==
=== Play-in Tournament ===
(3) ONIC Philippines vs. (6) Aurora Gaming PH

The high-stakes play-in series opened with an aggressive, back-and-forth trade of map victories as both teams aggressively draft-picked to exploit their respective comfort zones in Games 1 and 2. As the series shifted into the randomly selected battlegrounds of Games 3 and 4, the draft strategies became heavily calculated, resulting in highly methodical macro play and meticulous objective setups from both sides. Aurora Gaming PH managed to seize early game momentum and critical objective controls in the deciding Game 5, successfully carving out a noticeable net-worth resource advantage. However, despite their lead, Aurora completely faltered in execution during five-on-five skirmishes, failing to secure a single clean team fight victory against ONIC’s superior late-game synergy. The definitive breaking point occurred during a chaotic Lord dance at the 21-minute mark, where ONIC PH executed a flawless team fight wipeout to decisively shatter Aurora's base and seal the hard-fought 3-2 series win.

Aurora's defeat becomes the worst performance post-world championship by a defending world champion, getting eliminated in the play-in tournament. Bren Esports – during their pit for a back-to-back in Season 7 – finished fourth place.

Match 1	May 27, 2026	Onic Philippines	3	–	2	Aurora Gaming	San Juan, Metro Manila
	15:00 (UTC+8)	Onic Philippines wins the series, 3-2					Filoil EcoOil Center

(4) Smart Omega vs. (5) Twisted Minds PH

In the second high-stakes play-in match of the opening day, Smart Omega and Twisted Minds PH collided in a highly anticipated bracket showdown that heavily favored tactical macro adjustments. Smart Omega immediately set a dominant tone in the early games, dictating the map tempo with aggressive early-game rotations and superb jungle control to consistently secure primary objectives. Twisted Minds PH attempted to counter this momentum with highly defensive draft pivots, aiming to drag the matches into the late-game territory where their scaling composition could thrive. However, Smart Omega routinely exposed their opponents' defensive gaps, executing clinical five-on-five team fights and punishing Twisted Minds' positioning errors before their scaling could reach full potential. By the fourth game, Omega completely choked out Twisted Minds' map presence, securing a clean base siege at the 16-minute mark to confidently close out the series with a decisive 3–1 victory.

Match 2	May 27, 2026	Onic Philippines	3	–	1	Twisted Minds	San Juan, Metro Manila
	20:00 (UTC+8)	Smart Omega wins the series, 3-1					Filoil EcoOil Center

=== Upper Bracket Semifinals ===
(2) Team Falcons PH vs. (3) Onic Philippines

During the MPL Philippines Season 17 Playoffs, Onic Philippines delivered a 3-0 sweep over Team Falcons PH in the Upper Bracket Semifinals on Playoffs Day 2, dismantling the league's second-seeded team through their drafting, control, and team fighting. The victory highlighted Onic's playoff resurgence, as the squad transitioned from the departure of Kelra and the entry of Savero. With the sweep, Onic secured a place in the Upper Bracket Final and moved closer to qualifying for MSC 2026, while Team Falcons PH were sent to the lower bracket facing.

Match 3	May 28, 2026	Team Falcons PH	0	–	3	Onic Philippines	San Juan, Metro Manila
	15:00 (UTC+8)	Onic Philippines wins the series, 3-0					Filoil EcoOil Center

(1) Team Liquid PH vs. (4) Smart Omega

Team Liquid Philippines swept Smart Omega 3-0 in a commanding Lower Seed vs. Upper Seed clash on Playoffs Day 2. From the opening game, Liquid's superior macro play, objective setups, and team fight coordination consistently neutralized Omega's attempts to create momentum, allowing KarlTzy, Sanford, Sanji, and the rest of the squad to dictate the tempo across all three games and steadily build insurmountable advantages. The clean sweep secured Team Liquid PH's progression deeper into the upper bracket while reaffirming their championship credentials, as their disciplined execution and calculated aggression left Smart Omega with little room for comeback opportunities and highlighted the gap in playoff preparedness between the two teams.

Match 4	May 28, 2026	Team Liquid PH	3	–	0	Smart Omega	San Juan, Metro Manila
	20:00 (UTC+8)	Team Liquid PH wins the series, 3-0					Filoil EcoOil Center

=== Upper Bracket Finals ===
(1) Team Liquid PH vs. (3) Onic Philippines

The MPL Philippines Season 17 Upper Bracket Final saw Team Liquid PH reaffirm its status as the tournament favorite with a convincing 3–1 victory over Onic Philippines, securing the first Grand Finals berth and guaranteeing qualification to MSC 2026. After Onic's impressive lower-seeded playoff run and dominant performances in the preceding rounds, Team Liquid responded with superior macro play, cleaner objective control, and decisive teamfight execution, consistently punishing ONIC's attempts to gain momentum and dictating the pace of the series. While Onic showed flashes of the form that had propelled them through the playoffs, Team Liquid's composure in high-pressure moments, coupled with the veteran leadership of its star-studded roster, ultimately proved decisive as the team advanced directly to the championship stage and sent Onic to the lower bracket for a final chance at redemption.

Match 5	May 29, 2026	Team Liquid PH	3	–	1	Onic Philippines	San Juan, Metro Manila
	15:00 (UTC+8)	Team Liquid PH wins the series, 3-1					Filoil EcoOil Center

=== Lower Bracket Semifinals ===
(2) Team Falcons PH vs. (4) Smart Omega

The lower bracket semifinal showdown between Team Falcons PH and Smart Omega highlighted a high-stakes tactical battle, ending in a decisive 3-1 victory for the Falcons as they effectively capitalized on late-game macro execution. It revealed that Team Falcons PH successfully dismantled Smart Omega's defense by exploiting positioning errors and securing neutral objectives, effectively putting an end to Omega's resilient playoff resurgence. This critical triumph not only showcased the Falcons' superior drafting flexibility and composure under pressure but also propelled them further into the MPL Philippines Season 17 playoffs.

Match 6	May 29, 2026	Team Falcons PH	3	–	1	Smart Omega	San Juan, Metro Manila
	19:25 (UTC+8)	Team Falcons PH wins the series, 3-1					Filoil EcoOil Center

=== Lower Bracket Finals ===
(2) Team Falcons PH vs. (3) Onic Philippines

The lower bracket finals of the MPL Philippines Season 17 playoffs delivered a game of tactical discipline as Team Falcons PH secured a hard-fought 4-2 victory over Onic Philippines. It indicated that the Falcons' triumph hinged on their exceptional team fight orchestration and superior objective control, which systematically dismantled Onic's aggressive early-game rotations. This pivotal series highlight not only punched Team Falcons PH's ticket to the Grand Finals but also officially earned them a coveted representative slot for the upcoming Mid Season Cup 2026 in Paris.

Match 7	May 30, 2026	Team Falcons PH	4	–	2	Onic Philippines	San Juan, Metro Manila
	17:00 (UTC+8)	Team Falcons PH wins the series, 4-2					Filoil EcoOil Center

=== Grand Finals ===
(1) Team Liquid PH vs. (2) Team Falcons PH

The Grand Finals of the MPL Philippines Season 17 playoffs concluded with Team Liquid PH cementing their legacy by securing a 4-2 victory over Team Falcons PH at the Filoil EcoOil Centre. Despite a 2-2 equalizer from the Falcons in the middle of the best-of-seven series, Team Liquid PH’s map rotations and late-game team fights ultimately overwhelmed their opponents in Games 5 and 6. This triumph not only earned EXP laner Sanford "Sanford" Vinuya the tournament’s Most Valuable Player honor, but also established Team Liquid PH as the first-ever organization to achieve a historic three-peat in MPL Philippines history.

Match 8	May 31, 2026	Team Liquid PH	4	–	2	Team Falcons PH	San Juan, Metro Manila
	17:00 (UTC+8)	Team Liquid PH wins the series, 4-2					Filoil EcoOil Center

== Split 2 (Season 18) ==
Season 18 will begin on August 21, 2026 with the opening match being Aurora Gaming PH and Onic Philippines. This comes on the heels of the recent 2026 MLBB Mid Season Cup performances by defending champions Team Liquid PH and Team Falcons PH, the latter winning nth place.

=== Offseason ===
The off season of the league began after the conclusion of MPL Philippines Season 17 and subsequently during MSC 2026. These included roster moves from teams transferring players to their inactive rosters, loan moves, and outright release for players and coaches.

Team	Move	Player	Role	Move		Notes	Ref.
Team	Move	Player	Role	From	To	Notes	Ref.
AP Bren	Released	Kiel Vj "**Kielvj**" Cruzem	Exp Laner	Free Agent		Still unsigned as of writing	
AP Bren	Released	Karl Luigi "**Coach Giee**" Barrientos	Head Coach	Free Agent		Still unsigned as of writing	
AP Bren	Released	Jerome "**Coach Bom**" Domingo	Assistant Coach	Free Agent		Still unsigned as of writing	
AP Bren	Inactive	Jerry Ian "**Chovskrt**" Nicol	Substitute	Inactive Roster			
AP Bren	Inactive	Denniel "**Nova**" Gomez	Roamer	Inactive Roster			
AP Bren	Inactive	Arvie "**Aqua**" Antonio	Mid Laner	Inactive Roster			
AP Bren	Signed	Jhon Marl "**JMPINKMAN**" Sebastian	Exp Laner	VSG	**AP Bren**		
AP Bren	Signed	Jomearie "**Escalera**" Delos Santos	Roamer	Twisted Minds	**AP Bren**		
AP Bren	Signed	Lance "**LanceCy**" Cunanan	Mid Laner	TNC Pro Team	**AP Bren**		
AP Bren	Signed	Christian "**Coach Bitoy**" Casten	Head coach	EVIL Esports	**AP Bren**		
AP Bren	Signed	Robin "**Yobabz**" Benedicto	Assistant coach	AP Bren (Note: MDL Academy's roster.)	**AP Bren**		
AP Bren	Signed	Brian "**SpiderMilez**" Santos	Roamer	Bacon Time	**AP Bren**	Signed during Week 5 of the Season.	
Aurora Gaming PH	Loaned	Jonard Cedrix "**Demonkite**" Caranto	Jungler	RRQ Hoshi (MPL Indonesia)		Benched before being loaned out on July 27, 2026	
Aurora Gaming PH	Promoted	Gabriel "**DENJIRO**" Guinto	Jungler (Stand-in)	Aurora Gaming PH		Promoted from the team's MDL squad as stand-in for Demonkite	
Aurora Gaming PH	Released	Justin "**Calad**" Limbo	Sixth Man / Analyst	Free Agent			
Aurora Gaming PH	Retired	Edward Jay "**Edward**" Dapadap	Exp Laner	Retired			
Aurora Gaming PH	Signed	Nathanael "**Nathzz**" Estrologo	Exp Laner	Alpha7 North	**Aurora Gaming PH**		
Aurora Gaming PH	Signed	Kyle "**Koyl**" Reyes	Jungler	PRO Esports	**Aurora Gaming PH**		
Aurora Gaming PH	Signed	Justin Ericson "**Yecs**" Yecla	Sixth Man / Analyst	Free Agent	**Aurora Gaming PH**		
Smart Omega	Inactive	James "**Jeymz**" Gloria	Exp Laner	Bigetron by Vitality MY (MPL Malaysia)			
Smart Omega	Inactive	Kenneth "**Netskie**" Barro	Gold Laner	AC Esports (MPL Malaysia)			
Smart Omega	Signed	Wilbert "**Cull**" Salinda	Gold Laner	Team Liquid Academy	**Smart Omega**		
Smart Omega	Signed	Louis Gabriel "**Louis**' Ariola	Exp Laner	Galaxy Legends	**Smart Omega**		
Onic Philippines	Inactive	Nowee "**Ryota**" Macasa	Substitute	Inactive Roster		Later released from the team	
Onic Philippines	Released	Nowee "**Ryota**" Macasa	Substitute	Free Agent		Released July 24, 2026	
Onic Philippines	Released	Mark "**Bluffzy**" Reyes	Assistant Coach	Free Agent		Released July 24, 2026, same day as Macasa	
Onic Philippines	Signed	Angelo Kyle "**Phewww**" Arcangel	Head coach	Team Falcons PH	**Onic Philippines**	Transitions from a mid-laner to a head coach	
Onic Philippines	Signed	Czedrick "**Super Yoshi**" Romero	Roamer	CyberHero	**Onic Philippines**		
Onic Philippines	Signed	Dan Nathaniel "**Dan**" Yambao	Exp Laner	RRQ Hoshi	**Onic Philippines**		
Twisted Minds PH	Released	John Carlo "**Caloy**" Roma	Roamer	Free Agent		All released a few hours from each other on August 7, 2026.	
Twisted Minds PH	Released	Mico Capil "**Nosia**" Guevarra	Gold Laner	Free Agent		All released a few hours from each other on August 7, 2026.	
Twisted Minds PH	Released	Lee Howard "**Owl**" Gonzales	Sixth Man / Gold Laner	Free Agent		All released a few hours from each other on August 7, 2026.	
Twisted Minds PH	Released	Michael "**MP the King**" Endino	Jungler	Free Agent		League sources reports "Transferred" as of August 8, 2026.	
Twisted Minds PH	Released	Kristoffer "**Bon Chan**" Ricaplaza	Head coach	Free Agent			
Twisted Minds PH	Signed	Frederic "**Bennyqt**" Gonzales	Gold Laner	TNC Pro Team	**Twisted Minds PH**		
Twisted Minds PH	Signed	Stephen Jasper "**Sensu1**" Castillo	Jungler / Roamer	Free Agent	**Twisted Minds PH**		
Twisted Minds PH	Signed	Hendrich "**Lyrick**" Clahi	Head coach	Twisted Minds MENA	**Twisted Minds PH**		
Twisted Minds PH	Signed	Kurt "**Super Kurt**" Recto	Mid Laner	Free Agent	**Twisted Minds PH**		
Twisted Minds PH	Loaned	Alejandro "**Kayn**" Sombilon	Jungler	Dewa United PH	**Twisted Minds PH**		
Twisted Minds PH	Released	Stephen Jasper "**Sensu1**" Castillo	Jungler / Roamer	Twisted Minds PH	Free Agent	Released during Week 5 of the Season.	
Team Falcons PH	Inactive	Angelo Kyle "**Phewww**" Arcangel	Mid Laner	Free Agent		Spent one season with EVOS in MPL Indonesia. Currently Inactive for the team.	
Team Falcons PH	Released	Angelo Kyle "**Phewww**" Arcangel	Mid Laner	Team Falcons PH	**Onic Philippines**		
TNC Pro Team	Inactive	Frediemar "**3Mar**" Serafico	Exp Laner	Inactive Roster		Later released from the team	
TNC Pro Team	Released	Frediemar "**3Mar**" Serafico	Exp Laner	Team Flash (MPL Malaysia)		Released June 19, 2026. Newest Exp-Laner for Team Flash MY last August 3, 2026.	
TNC Pro Team	Inactive	Lance "**LanceCy**" Cunanan	Mid Laner	Inactive Roster			
TNC Pro Team	Released	Lance "**LanceCy**" Cunanan	Mid Laner	TNC Pro Team	**AP Bren**		
TNC Pro Team	Inactive	Dale "**Stowm**" Vidor	Substitute	Inactive Roster			
TNC Pro Team	Inactive	Frederic "**Bennyqt**" Gonzales	Gold Laner	Inactive Roster			
TNC Pro Team	Released	Frederic "**Bennyqt**" Gonzales	Gold Laner	TNC Pro Team	**Twisted Minds PH**		
TNC Pro Team	Inactive	Joshua "**Ch4knu**" Mangilog	Roamer	Inactive Roster			
TNC Pro Team	Signed	Nowee "**Ryota**" Macasa	Exp Laner	Onic Philippines	**TNC Pro Team**		
TNC Pro Team	Signed	Ervin "**Vinnn**" Franco	Mid Laner	Twisted Minds RWE	**TNC Pro Team**		
TNC Pro Team	Signed	Jomari "**Jowm**" Pingol	Gold Laner	Team Rey	**TNC Pro Team**		
TNC Pro Team	Signed	Zehnder "**Zehn**" Fabugais	Roamer	Aurora Gaming Hunters	**TNC Pro Team**		

=== Rosters ===
Defending champions	Player Transfer	Mid-Season Transfer	Position/Role Vacated	Coaching Transfer	**Bold**	Team Captain	Italic	Import

Team	Coaching staff				Players					
Team	Manager	Head coach	Assistant coach	Analyst	Exp Laner	Jungler	Mid Laner	Gold Laner	Roamer	Sixthman
AP Bren	Adi	**Coach Bitoy**	**Yobabz**	-	**JMPINKMAN (Note: Formerly Lord JM)**	Jamespangks	**LanceCy**	**Shizhou**	**SpiderMilez** (Note: Transferred from MSL Thailand during Week 5.)	**Allen**; **Escalera**
Aurora Gaming	Rada	Master The Basics	Dex Star	**Yecs (Note: Also a Sixth Man)**	**Nathzz**	**Koyl**	Yue	Domeng	Light	**Yecs**
Smart Omega	Rianne	Wurahhhh	Lembot		**Louis**	Raizen	Minguin	**Cull**	Perkz	Peuder
ONIC Philippines	Vacant	**Pheww**	**Haze (Note: Demoted from Head coach to Assistant coach)**	**Xy**	Kirk	K1NGKONG	Super Frince	Savero	Brusko	**Dan**; **Super Yoshi**
Team Falcons PH	Vacant	Ducky	Moody	Vr3n	Flap	Kyle	Hadji	Super Marco	Owgwen	Ferdz
Team Liquid PH	Mitch	Aeon	SN4P	Daiki.	Sanford	KarlTzy	Sanji	Teddy	Jaypee	Daiki.
TNC Pro Team	Dredd	E2MAX	FindingHito		**Ryota**	Zaida	**Vinnn**	**Jowm**	**Zehn**	**Yeyeniya**
Twisted Minds PH	Lexie	**Lyrick**	Eson		LANSU	**Kayn** (Note: Loaned from Dewa United Indonesia during Week 4.)	Sionnn	**Bennyqt**	**Tracyyy**	**KURT**

=== Standings ===
Pos	Team	Pld	W	L	Pts	GW	GL	GD	Qualification
1	Team Liquid PH (Q)	14	12	2	12	25	6	+19	Secured Upper Bracket
2	Team Falcons PH (Q)	14	12	2	12	26	10	+16	Secured Upper Bracket
3	Onic Philippines (Q)	14	9	5	9	21	14	+7	Qualified for Playoffs
4	Aurora Gaming (Q)	14	9	5	9	20	13	+7	Qualified for Playoffs
5	Smart Omega (Q)	14	7	7	7	15	18	−3	Qualified for Playoffs
6	TNC Pro Team (Q)	14	4	10	4	14	22	−8	Qualified for Playoffs
7	AP Bren (E)	14	3	11	3	10	23	−13	
8	Twisted Minds PH (E)	14	0	14	0	3	28	−25	

Updated to match(es) played on unknown. Source: https://ph-mpl.com/
(E) Eliminated; (Q) Qualified to the phase indicated

=== Teams of the Week ===
MVP of the Week

Week No.	Exp Lane	Jungler	Mid Lane	Gold Lane	Roamer
Week 1	Jann Kirk "**Kirk**" Gutierrez (Onic Philippines)	Michael Angelo "**Kyle**" Sayson (Team Falcons PH)	Salic Alauya "**Hadji**" Imam (Team Falcons PH)	Marco Stephen "**Super Marco**" Requitiano (Team Falcons PH)	Czedrick Jaylord "**Super Yoshi**" Romero (Onic Philippines)
Week 2	Jann Kirk "**Kirk**" Gutierrez (Onic Philippines)	Dean Christian "**Raizen**" Sumagui (Smart Omega)	Frince Miguel "**Super Frince**" Ramirez (Onic Philippines)	Clayton "**Savero**" Kuswanto (Onic Philippines)	Jay pee "**Jaypee**" Dela Cruz (Team Liquid PH)
Week 3	Sanford "**Sanford**" Vinuya (Team Liquid PH)	Karl Gabriel "**KarlTzy**" Nepomuceno (Team Liquid PH)	Kenneth "**Yue**" Tadeo (Aurora Gaming)	Marco Stephen "**Super Marco**" Requitiano (Team Falcons PH)	Jay pee "**Jaypee**" Dela Cruz (Team Liquid PH)
Week 4	David "**Flap**" Canon (Team Falcons PH)	Dean Christian "**Raizen**" Sumagui (Smart Omega)	Salic Alauya "**Hadji**" Imam (Team Falcons PH)	Marco Stephen "**Super Marco**" Requitiano (Team Falcons PH)	Rowgien Stimpson "**Owgwen**" Unigo (Team Falcons PH)
Week 5	Nathanael "**Nathzz**" Estrologo (Aurora Gaming PH)	Karl Gabriel "**KarlTzy**" Nepomuceno (Team Liquid PH)	Kenneth "**Yue**" Tadeo (Aurora Gaming PH)	Jan Dominic "**Domeng**" Del Delmundo (Aurora Gaming PH)	Dylan Aaron "**Light**" Catipon (Aurora Gaming PH)
Week 6	David "**Flap**" Canon (Team Falcons PH)	Michael Angelo "**Kyle**" Sayson (Team Falcons PH)	Salic Alauya "**Hadji**" Imam (Team Falcons PH)	Marco Stephen "**Super Marco**" Requitiano (Team Falcons PH)	Rowgien Stimpson "**Owgwen**" Unigo (Team Falcons PH)
Week 7	Nathanael "**Nathzz**" Estrologo (Aurora Gaming PH)	Michael Angelo "**Kyle**" Sayson (Team Falcons PH)	Salic Alauya "**Hadji**" Imam (Team Falcons PH)	Jan Dominic "**Domeng**" Del Delmundo (Aurora Gaming PH)	Dylan Aaron "**Light**" Catipon (Aurora Gaming PH)
Week 8	Sanford "**Sanford**" Vinuya (Team Liquid PH)	Karl Gabriel "**KarlTzy**" Nepomuceno (Team Liquid PH)	Alston "**Sanji**" Pabico (Team Liquid PH)	Jan Dominic "**Domeng**" Del Delmundo (Aurora Gaming PH)	Jay pee "**Jaypee**" Dela Cruz (Team Liquid PH)

== Playoffs ==
Play-In Round (Best-of-5)
3	ONIC	3
6	TNC Pro Team	2
4	Aurora	3
5	Smart Omega	2

Upper Bracket Semifinals (Best-of-5)
2	Team Falcons PH	3
3	ONIC	0
1	Team Liquid PH	1
4	Aurora	3
Lower Bracket Semifinals (Best-of-5)
3	ONIC	0
1	Team Liquid PH	3

Upper Bracket Finals (Best-of-5)
2	Team Falcons PH	3
4	Aurora	2
Lower Bracket Finals (Best-of-7)
1	Team Liquid PH	3
4	Aurora	4

Grand Finals (Best-of-7)
2	Team Falcons PH	2
4	Aurora	4

== Notable events ==
On February 28, 2026, as part of Sibol's preparations for the 2026 Asian Games in Japan, the team tapped the services of Michael "Arcadia" Bocado from the Selangor Red Giants, Francis "Ducky" Glindro from Team Falcons PH, and Denver "Yeb" Miranda from Onic Indonesia to go alongside the coaching staff led by Onic Philippines head coach Anthony “Ynot” Senedrin. The following day, however, after YnoT's departure to Natus Vincere and roster changes involving Onic Philippines' Kelra and Team Liquid PH's Oheb led to Sibol announced another round of qualifiers.

The inaugural Esports Nations Cup qualifiers sent a team consisting of KarlTzy, Flap, Sanji, Super Marco, and Jaypee to the competition. On June 4th, the community had unveiled that during the announcement that Onic Esports teammates Kairi and Kelra have been added to the rotation for Team Philippines.

== Controversies and criticisms ==
=== Team Liquid PH and Oheb Issue ===
On February 6, 2026, former TLPH gold laner Kiel Calvin “Oheb” Soriano formally submitted his resignation from the team after he had intently announced it four days prior to the organization. This prompted TLPH to find a replacement gold laner in Daiki and AeronShikii to fill in Soriano’s void.

March 21, 2026, the competitor to MLBB Honor of Kings announced Soriano’s entry into the HoK community, announced via a video and a red carpet event in Bonifacio Global City (BGC).

On March 27, 2026, Team Liquid PH released a formal statement about the organization’s actions moving forward following the discourse. The management had announced its intention to pursue legal actions against Soriano citing “breach of contract” from the player that they did not intend to replace for the upcoming MPL Philippines Season 17. They also clarified that Sultan “AeronnShikii” Muhammad will be leaving bootcamp due to the party’s failure of acquiring the necessary documents to justify his playing stint in the Philippines. TLPH promoted MDL gold laner and Asian Games Gold Laner Dave “Teddyqt” Viaña to the roster thereafter.
