= Yawi (gamer) =

Filipino professional esports player (born 2001)

Personal information
- Born: Tristan Cabrera; Philippines

Current team
- Team: WeTrnd Esports
- Role: Roamer
- Game(s): Mobile Legends: Bang Bang; Honor of Kings

Tristan Cabrera (born c. 2001), professionally known as Yawi, is a Filipino professional esports player. He competes in Honor of Kings for WeTrnd Esports. He is best known for his career in Mobile Legends: Bang Bang (MLBB), where he won the M4 World Championship with ECHO and the MPL Indonesia Season 14 title with Team Liquid ID.

== Early life and education ==
Tristan Cabrera attended the University of Santo Tomas (UST) for high school, where he played for the school's varsity basketball team. He later attended Mapúa University for his senior high school studies while balancing his esports career. His mother supported his career, often bringing him food and clothes during bootcamps. Cabrera stated that he had to miss family events, such as his brother's graduation, to attend practice scrimmages.

== Career ==
=== Mobile Legends: Bang Bang ===
==== Nexplay Esports ====
Cabrera began his professional career with Nexplay Esports (later Nexplay EVOS). He formed a trio known as the "Big Three" alongside teammates John Paul "H2wo" Salonga and Renejay "Renejay" Barcarse. In MPL Philippines Season 8, he recorded 262 assists, 38 kills, and 161 deaths. Cabrera left the team in December 2021.

==== ECHO ====
In late 2021, Cabrera joined ECHO for MPL Philippines Season 9. In Season 10, he helped the team reach the grand finals, securing a spot in the M4 World Championship.

In January 2023, Cabrera won the M4 World Championship in Jakarta. He was benched for the team's opening match against RRQ Hoshi but returned to the lineup to defeat Blacklist International 4–0 in the finals. Following the world title, ECHO won the MPL Philippines Season 11 championship in May 2023.

During MPL Philippines Season 12, Cabrera saw limited playing time and was replaced in the starting lineup by Jaypee "Jaypee" Dela Cruz. The team's coaching staff stated that Jaypee offered a playstyle that was less risky than Cabrera's aggressive mechanics. Cabrera officially parted ways with ECHO in January 2024.

==== Team Liquid ID ====
In February 2024, Cabrera moved to Indonesia to join Aura Fire (later rebranded as Team Liquid ID). He was the first Filipino import to play for the Aura franchise. Cabrera noted that he focused on teaching his new teammates "discipline" regarding in-game objectives.

In October 2024, Cabrera won his second MPL title when Team Liquid ID defeated RRQ Hoshi 4–3 in the MPL Indonesia Season 14 Grand Finals. A crucial "Lord steal" at the 13:16 mark of the deciding Game 7 contributed to the victory. He left the team in late November 2024.

==== TNC Pro Team ====
Cabrera returned to the Philippines in November 2024 to join TNC Pro Team. The move reunited him with his former mentor Setsuna "Dogie" Ignacio. With Cabrera, TNC qualified for the playoffs in MPL Philippines Season 15, ending a drought of playoff appearances for the organization. He departed TNC on July 2, 2025.

=== Honor of Kings ===
In July 2025, Cabrera transitioned to the game Honor of Kings. He reunited with his former Nexplay teammates Salonga and Barcarse, along with Ignacio, for the move. In August 2025, he joined WeTrnd Esports to compete in the Philippines Kings League (PKL) Fall Season 2025.

== Player profile ==
Cabrera plays the Roamer role and is known for using the hero Chou. He has referred to himself as the "Chou god" due to his high win rate with the character in professional play. In March 2023, he was named the Player of the Week in MPL Philippines Season 11 after recording 5.75 assists and a KDA of 3.10. In May 2023, he stated he worked on his mental and physical conditioning to redeem himself after a playoff loss to RSG Slate.

== Personal life ==
In January 2023, Cabrera was involved in a controversy regarding his relationship with National University volleyball player Jennifer Nierva. The issue surfaced on social media shortly before the M4 World Championship, and ECHO management stated they addressed the matter internally.

During MPL Philippines Season 12, ECHO manager Mitch Liwanag received death threats from fans after the team decided to bench Cabrera. Cabrera later addressed the fans, clarifying there was no internal conflict and asking them to support the team's decisions.
