= MPL Philippines Season 7 =

- 2021

Tournament information
- Game: Mobile Legends: Bang Bang
- Location: Philippines
- Dates: March 19, 2021–May 30, 2021
- Administrator: Moonton
- Tournament formats: Regular Season; Double round robin; Playoffs; 8-team Double elimination
- Teams: 10
- Purse: $120,000 USD

Final positions
- Champion: Blacklist International
- 1st runners-up: Execration
- 2nd runners-up: AURA Philippines
- MVP: Edward Jay "EDWARD" Dapadap (Blacklist International)

The MPL Philippines Season 7 was the seventh season of the Mobile Legends Professional League (MPL) in the Philippines and the seventh iteration of the tournament.. At that time, Bren Esports, who came off from a victorious run in the M2 World Championship securing a historic championship for the Philippines, were the defending champions as they have defeated Execration in the previous season 6, 4 games to 2.

The season began on March 19, 2021, and concluded with the final game of the season's playoffs, the grand finals, with Blacklist International securing the league championship against Execration after a full-seven game in a best-of-seven championship series, 4 games to 3, to claim its maiden championship. This was the final season that the promotion and relegation system was used as starting in eighth season, the league turned into a professional franchise-based league.

== Background ==
M2 World Champions Bren Esports were deemed as the favorites to repeat as MPL-PH Champions for this season, as the squad have won the MLBB M2 World Championships in Singapore earlier on January 24, 2021, taking down Myanmar's Burmese Ghouls, 4 games to 3 in a best-of-7 championship series. They also have beaten Execration in the previous season in six games, 4 games to 2 to claim its maiden championship.

- This was the first MPL appearance for Playbook Esports and Work Auster Force, that qualified from the Open Qualifiers which saw thousands of teams across the country fight for a spot in the league.

== Regular season ==
The ten teams were divided into two groups of five teams each. Teams within the same group played a double round robin format, meeting them twice (8 games) and all teams played against the other group in a single round robin format, meeting them once (5 games), for a total of 13 games played by each team in the regular season.

=== Standings ===
==== Group A ====
Pos	Team	Pld	W	L	MF	MA	MD	Pts	Qualification
1	AURA Philippines	13	9	4	21	12	+9	26	Upper Bracket Playoffs
2	Bren Esports	13	8	5	19	14	+5	23 (Note: Bren wins regular season series, 2–0)	Upper Bracket Playoffs
3	Work Auster Force	13	8	5	18	13	+5	23	Lower Bracket Playoffs
4	ONIC Philippines	13	7	6	15	16	−1	18	Lower Bracket Playoffs
5	Cignal Ultra Warriors	13	0	13	5	26	−21	5	Eliminated

Source: MPL Official Website

==== Group B ====
Pos	Team	Pld	W	L	MF	MA	MD	Pts	Qualification
1	Blacklist International	13	12	1	25	7	+18	32	Upper Bracket Playoffs
2	Smart Omega	13	6	7	15	14	+1	21	Upper Bracket Playoffs
3	Execration	13	6	7	17	17	0	20	Lower Bracket Playoffs
4	Nexplay Esports	13	6	7	16	18	−2	15	Lower Bracket Playoffs
5	Playbook Esports	13	2	11	8	22	−14	8	Eliminated

Source: MPL Official Website

== Playoffs ==
With the playoffs being held still entirely online due to the threat of the ongoing COVID-19 pandemic, all games were cast inside the MPL Arena.

- The top two teams in each group qualified for the Upper Bracket Playoffs
- The next two teams in each group qualified for the Lower Bracket Playoffs
- All games in the playoffs were in a Bo5 format, except for the Grand Finals
- Grand Final was a Bo7 series

=== Bracket ===
Upper Bracket Semifinals	Upper Bracket Final	Grand Final
A1	AURA Philippines	3
B2	Smart Omega	2
A1	AURA Philippines	1
B1	Blacklist International	3
B1	Blacklist International	3
A2	Bren Esports	2
B1	Blacklist International	4
B3	Execration	3
Lower Bracket - Round 1	Lower Bracket Quarterfinals	Lower Bracket Semifinals	Lower Bracket Final
A2	Bren Esports	3
A3	Work Auster Force	3	A3	Work Auster Force	1	A1	AURA Philippines	0
B4	Nexplay Esports	1	A2	Bren Esports	2	B3	Execration	3
B3	Execration	3
B2	Smart Omega	2
A4	ONIC Philippines	2	B3	Execration	3
B3	Execration	3

== Playoff Matchup Results ==
=== Day No. 1 ===
Team 1	Series	Team 2	Game 1	Game 2	Game 3	Game 4	Game 5
(#3) Work Auster Force	3-1	(#4) Nexplay Solid	NXPE	WORK	WORK	WORK	
(#2) AURA Philippines	3-2	(#2) Omega Esports	OMG	AURA	AURA	OMG	AURA

=== Day No. 2 ===
Team 1	Series	Team 2	Game 1	Game 2	Game 3	Game 4	Game 5
(#2) Bren Esports	3-2	(#4) ONIC Philippines	BREN	ONIC	BREN	ONIC	BREN
(#1) Blacklist International	3-2	(#2) Bren Esports	BLCK	BLCK	BREN	BREN	BLCK

=== Day No. 3 ===
Team 1	Series	Team 2	Game 1	Game 2	Game 3	Game 4	Game 5
(#2) Bren Esports	3-1	(#3) Work Auster Force	BREN	WORK	BREN	BREN	
(#3) Execration	3-2	(#2) Omega Esports	EXE	OMG	EXE	OMG	EXE

=== Day No. 4 ===
Team 1	Series	Team 2	Game 1	Game 2	Game 3	Game 4	Game 5
(#1) Blacklist International	3-1	(#1) AURA Philippines	BLCK	BLCK	AURA	BLCK	
(#3) Execration	3-2	(#2) Bren Esports	BREN	BREN	EXE	EXE	EXE

=== Day No. 5 and Grand Finals ===
Team 1	Series	Team 2	Game 1	Game 2	Game 3	Game 4	Game 5	Game 6	Game 7
(#3) Execration	3-0	(#1) AURA Philippines	EXE	EXE	EXE				
(#1) Blacklist International	4-3	(#3) Execration	EXE	EXE	BLCK	EXE	BLCK	BLCK	BLCK
