= MPL Philippines Season 9 =

Esports tournament

- 2022

Tournament information
- Game: Mobile Legends: Bang Bang
- Location: Philippines
- Dates: February 18, 2022–May 1, 2022
- Administrator: Moonton
- Tournament format: Round-robin tournament - Regular Season
- Venue: SMX Convention Center, Pasay City (Playoffs)
- Teams: 8
- Purse: $150,000 USD

Final positions
- Champions: RSG Philippines (1st title)
- 1st runners-up: Smart Omega
- 2nd runners-up: TNC Pro Team - ML

Tournament statistics
- Regular Season MVP: Dylan "Light" Catipon
- Finals MVP: Nathanael "Nathzz" Estrologo

The MPL Philippines Season 9 is the ninth season of the Mobile Legends Professional League (MPL) of the Philippines. The season began on February 18, 2022, with all teams from last season participating once again. With the 2021+1 Southeast Asian Games being held in May, the conclusion of the season's playoffs were held last May 1, 2022 to give way for Team Sibol's participation in the biennial meet.

After a nearly perfect playoff run with 10–1 win-loss record, RSG Philippines have secured their first MPL Championship after defeating Smart Omega in five games in the best-of-seven grand finals, with Nathanael "Nathzz" Estrologo winning the Finals MVP award. This would become RSG Philippines' first championship title after its establishment in MPL PH S8.

== Venues and Competition Format ==
According to the organizing committee of the league, they have been looking to stage the entire regular season in an offline format but with no live audience in the meantime, due to the ongoing COVID-19 crisis.

Last February 11, the league has received an approval from the Games and Amusements Board (GAB) to conduct an offline setting (LAN event) of the season starting Week 5 of the Regular Season. However, in an update from February 14, instead of the originally scheduled Week 5, the MPL will begin its offline format of the tournament starting Week 3 of the Regular Season, which began on March 4, two weeks earlier than the original date. The season will be still played with no live audience and the access on MPL Arena are restricted to only players, casters, and staff for safety purposes, but the games are still to be livestreamed on the official social media platforms via Facebook Gaming, YouTube, and on TikTok.

== Roster Changes ==
=== Blacklist International ===
- Two-time MPL-PH champions and M3 World Champions Johnmar "OhMyV33NUS" Villaluna and Danerie James "Wise" Del Rosario will not be playing for this season, owing to their 'much-needed break'. The duo of Blacklist International has steered the Blacklist team to three championships and two first runner-up finishes in 2021 MLBB season in which two championships came from the wins of MPL Season 7 and Season 8, and the third came from the MLBB M3 World Championship, in which they have swept the Grand Finals against compatriot ONIC Philippines, 4 games to 0, to secure the back-to-back world championships for the Philippines.

=== Bren Esports ===
- CJ "Ribo" Ribo, will not be playing for this season, as announced in his Facebook account that he will rest for the said season. Ribo has won several MLBB tournaments in both local and international levels, including a gold medal which he won during the MLBB tournament of the 2019 Southeast Asian Games representing Team Philippines.

=== ECHO Philippines ===
- The team unveiled its roster for this season last December 21, 2021, featuring some of what is considered by many as a 'super team' in key acquisitions of M2 World Champion and Finals MVP Karl Gabriel 'KarlTzy' Nepomuceno which he departed from his former team in Bren Esports, along with former member of Nexplay EVOS Tristan "Yawi" Cabrera and former EXP laner of TNC Pro Team, Frediemar '3MarTzy' Serafico. Also returning for the team is Ashley Marco "Killuash" Cruz, who took a break from the competitive scene last season.
- The team also retained the services of holdovers from last season in Christian "Rafflesia" Fajura, Jaymark "Hadess" Lazaro, Jankurt "KurtTzy" Matira, Aaron "AaronQT" Lim, Benedict "BennyQT" Gonzales, and Rion "RK3" Kudo.

=== Nexplay EVOS ===
- With the sudden departure of Tristan "YAWI" Cabrera, Nexplay EVOS' named "Big Three" in Cabrera, John Paul "H2WO" Salonga and Renejay "RENEJAY" Barcarse, has ended after being formed in Season 6. Nexplay would retain the services for Salonga, Barcarse, Jeniel Bata "YELLYHAZE" Anon and Jhonwin Dela Merced "HESA" Vergara and the additions of rookies in Mariusz Villamero "DONUT" Tan, Rainiel Jhim Agustin "URESHIII" Logronio, the addition of Veteran player Jeff Lenjesson "S4gitnu" Subang, Kenneth Palejo "CADENZA" Castro, Michael Medrocillo "MP the King" Endino and Emmanuel Cervantes "Elpizo" Candelaria.

=== Smart Omega ===
- After getting eliminated from the Grand Finals contention in the Lower-bracket Finals against Blacklist International, Smart Omega had finished third, failing to secure a spot for the MLBB M3 World Championship. Smart Omega would retain its roster, but with the addition of Jhonville Borres "OUTPLAYED!" Villar and Cesar Jefferson "Amethyst" Santos.

=== ONIC Philippines ===
- Despite finishing as runner-up for the MLBB M3 World Championships in the hands of Blacklist International, ONIC Philippines would keep and maintain its roster from MPL Philippines Season 8.

=== RSG Philippines ===
- Being a new team in MPL Philippines Season 8, RSG Philippines would be eliminated early in the play-in tournament against Smart Omega. RSG Philippines would keep its MPL Philippines Season 8 roster intact but would make significant changes with the additions of Dylan Aaron "Light" Catipon and Clarense Jay "Kousei" Camilo, players from TNC Pro Team - ML. However, Joshwell Christian "Iy4knu" Manaoag had previously announced that he will be taking a break from the professional scene.

=== TNC Pro Team ===
- After a disappointing finish on MPL Philippines Season 8, TNC Pro Team would begin a rebuild process after the departure of Dylan Aaron "Light" Catipon and Clarense Jay "Kousei" Camilo to RSG Philippines, Patrick "P-GOD" Grecia, Frediemar "3MarTzy" Serafico to ECHO Philippines, Douglas Joseph "ImbaDeejay" Astibe II, Landher "Der" San Gabriel, Adrian "Toshi." Bacallo as a break from the professional scene, and its coach John Laurence "Lift" Ruiz, TNC Pro Team had just released most of its roster.
- TNC Pro Team would keep the service of Ben Seloe Dizon "Benthings" Maglaque and Shemaiah Daniel "Chuuu" Chu (Now SDZYZ) and adding four new players in Jomarie "Escalera" Delos Santos, Mark Genzon Sojero "Kramm" Rusiana, Robee Bryan "Yasuwo" Promocille and Salman "KingSalman" Macarambon to form its MPL Philippines Season 9 roster.

== Regular season ==
The regular season began on February 18, 2022, and ended on April 10, 2022. The regular season were a double round-robin format, with each team playing against their opponents twice, for a total of 14 games being played per team. A total of three group stage points may be earned in a single regular season match, based on the following:

- If the match is decided by a 2–0 score, the winner shall earn 3 group stage points, while the loser earns 0 group stage points.
- If the match is decided by a 2–1 score, the winner shall earn 2 group stage points, while the loser earns 1 group stage point.

The top two teams of the standings gained outright qualification to the Upper Bracket Semifinals, while the next four teams qualified for the play-ins. With the new playoff rule being introduced this season, the first-placed and third-placed teams shall decide the match-ups for the play-ins.

Pos	Team	Pld	W	L	MF	MA	MD	Pts	Qualification
1	q – RSG Philippines	14	11	3	23	9	+14	31	Upper-Bracket Teams for the Playoffs
2	q – TNC Pro Team - ML	14	9	5	21	13	+8	27	Upper-Bracket Teams for the Playoffs
3	q – ECHO Philippines	14	8	6	19	13	+6	26	Qualified for the Play-in Tournament
4	q – Nexplay EVOS	14	6	8	15	18	−3	19 (Note: 1–1 at regular season series, Games won head-to-head: NXPE 3–2 Onic PH)	Qualified for the Play-in Tournament
5	q – ONIC Philippines	14	8	6	18	19	−1	19	Qualified for the Play-in Tournament
6	q – Smart Omega	14	6	8	16	20	−4	18	Qualified for the Play-in Tournament
7	e – Blacklist International	14	3	11	13	24	−11	14	Eliminated from the Playoffs
8	e – Bren Esports	14	5	9	11	20	−9	14	Eliminated from the Playoffs

Source: MPL Philippines official website
Rules for classification: Head-to-head record, number of winning games, match length of victories, tiebreaker game
e – Eliminated; q – Qualified for the phase indicated

=== Notes ===
1. Due to the absence of Nexplay EVOS during Week 4 Day 3, Nexplay was ultimately disqualified, prescribed by the MPL-Philippines rule book (7.3.4.2.8) and provided ECHO Philippines, Nexplay EVOS' supposed challenger, was given the win, by default.

== Playoffs ==
For this season, the league has announced a new format for the season. While six teams are still to contend for the playoffs, the top two teams after the regular season will still get an outright Upper Bracket Semifinal slots, however, the matchups for the play-in rounds will be decided by the first and third-seeded teams.

Similar to last season, all matches will still follow a best-of-five format except for the Grand Finals, which will be a best-of-seven series.

MPL Philippines Season 9 will be played and shown at SM Cinemas. Announced during Week 8, Day 3.

On 12 April 2022, the seeding of the teams in the play-ins was announced with the Playoffs to begin on 28 April.

On April 28, it was then revealed that all of the playoff games were held inside the SMX Convention Center, Pasay City, with limited audience witnessing the games inside the venue.

=== Bracket ===
Play-ins; April 28, 2022
ECHO Philippines	0
Smart Omega	3
Nexplay EVOS	2
ONIC Philippines	3

Bracket Semifinals; April 29–30, 2022
Upper Bracket
TNC Pro Team - ML	3
Smart Omega	1
Upper Bracket
RSG Philippines	3
ONIC Philippines	0
Lower Bracket
Smart Omega	3
ONIC Philippines	0

Bracket Finals; April 30–May 1, 2022
Upper Bracket
TNC Pro Team - ML	0
RSG Philippines	3
Lower Bracket
Smart Omega	3
TNC Pro Team - ML	0

Grand Finals; May 1, 2022
RSG Philippines	4
Smart Omega	1

=== Play-ins ===
Play-ins are a best-of-5 format, winner advances to the Upper Bracket Semifinals while the losers are eliminated.

Team 1	Series	Team 2	Game 1	Game 2	Game 3	Game 4	Game 5
ECHO Philippines	0–3	Smart Omega	OMG	OMG	OMG		
Nexplay EVOS	2–3	ONIC Philippines	ONIC	NXP	ONIC	NXP	ONIC

=== Upper Bracket Semifinals ===
Date: April 29, 2022

Team 1	Series	Team 2	Game 1	Game 2	Game 3	Game 4	Game 5
RSG Philippines	3–0	ONIC Philippines	RSG	RSG	RSG		
TNC Pro Team - ML	3–1	Smart Omega	TNC	OMG	TNC	TNC	

=== Lower Bracket Semifinals ===
Date: April 30, 2022

Team 1	Series	Team 2	Game 1	Game 2	Game 3	Game 4	Game 5
Smart Omega	3–0	ONIC Philippines	OMG	OMG	OMG		

=== Upper Bracket Finals ===
Date: April 30, 2022

Team 1	Series	Team 2	Game 1	Game 2	Game 3	Game 4	Game 5
TNC Pro Team - ML	0–3	RSG Philippines	RSG	RSG	RSG		

=== Lower Bracket Finals ===
Date: May 1, 2022
Venue: SMX Convention Center, Pasay City

Team 1	Series	Team 2	Game 1	Game 2	Game 3	Game 4	Game 5
TNC Pro Team - ML	0–3	Smart Omega	OMG	OMG	OMG		

=== Grand Finals ===
Grand Finalists will represent the Philippines on MSC 2022, and will be a best-of-seven championship series.
Date & Time: May 1, 2022 – 7:00 pm

RSG Philippines will be the first team to represent the Philippines in MSC 2022 after defeating TNC Pro Team - ML in 3 games during the Upper-Bracket Finals. Defending MSC Champions Smart Omega defeated TNC Pro Team in the Lower-Bracket Finals, appearing in their second Grand Finals since MPL PH Season 6.

Venue: SMX Convention Center, Pasay City

Team 1	Series	Team 2	Game 1	Game 2	Game 3	Game 4	Game 5	Game 6	Game 7
(#1) RSG Philippines	4–1	Smart Omega	RSG	OMG	RSG	RSG	RSG		

== Awards ==
=== Regular season Weekly MVPs ===
Every Week, a player from the teams that had faced off during one week of the season is awarded as the Regular Season's Weekly MVP. This tradition has been part of the achievements sections of MPL Philippines since Season 7.

Week	Player	Team
1	SDZYZ	TNC Pro Team (1)
2	EMANN	RSG Philippines (1)
3	KurtTzy	ECHO Philippines
4	Hatred	ONIC Philippines
5	Joy Boy	Bren Esports
6	Escalera	TNC Pro Team (2)
7	Light	RSG Philippines (2)
8	E2MAX	Omega Esports

=== Individual awards ===
Award	Player name	Team
Regular Season MVP	Light	RSG Philippines
Finals MVP	Nathzz	RSG Philippines
Rookie of the Season	Escalera	TNC Pro Team

=== Team of the Season ===
Name	Position	Team
Kelra	Gold Lane	Smart Omega
Nathzz	EXP Lane	RSG Philippines
Light	Roam	RSG Philippines
Demonkite	Jungle	RSG Philippines
Aqua	Mid Lane	RSG Philippines

== See also ==
- MPL Philippines
- MLBB M3 World Championship
