= MPL Philippines Season 8 =

Esports tournament

- 2021

Tournament information
- Game: Mobile Legends: Bang Bang
- Location: Philippines
- Dates: August 27–October 24, 2021
- Administrator: Moonton
- Venues: MPL Arena (Regular season and playoffs); World Trade Center Manila (Playoffs and Grand Finals)
- Teams: 8
- Purse: US$150,000

Final positions
- Champions: Blacklist International (2nd title)
- 1st runners-up: ONIC Philippines
- 2nd runners-up: Smart Omega
- MVP: Salic "Hadji" Imam (Blacklist International)

The MPL-Philippines Season 8 was the eight iteration of the Mobile Legends: Bang Bang Professional League (MPL) of the Philippines. The season ran from August 27, 2021, and ended on the conclusion of the Grand Finals on October 24, 2021. Season 8 was the fourth online tournament in MPL Philippines primarily due to the COVID-19 pandemic.

The season was known for its shift to the franchise-based setup system and that numerous franchises would be added on by the league. The season concluded with Blacklist International winning the season's championship defeating ONIC Philippines in the best-of-seven grand final series, 4–1, to win back-to-back MPL championships and becoming the second team to do this in league history. The first to do it was the Sunsparks, winning both titles for Seasons 4 and 5.

== Background ==
This season would be the fourth tournament held almost online, except for the Grand Finals which was held offline with no live audience at the World Trade Center, Pasay City. The season saw a dramatic decrease in viewership, obtaining 26.5 million hours watched compared to Season 7's 33 million. This was primarily due to the lost and abandoning of other languages' streams such as the English and Indonesian streams. Furthermore, its peak viewers would rank 3rd all-time with 593,399 peak viewers compared to Season 7's 1.4 million peak viewers and Season 6's 765.9 thousand viewers.

The season also served as the Philippine qualifiers for the Mobile Legends: Bang Bang World Championship or known as M3.

== Regular season ==
=== Format ===
The regular season began on August 27, 2021, and ended on October 10, 2021. The regular season was a double round-robin format, with each team plays their opponents twice, for a total of 14 games being played per team. A total of three group stage points may be earned in a single regular season match, based on the following:

- If the match is decided by a 2–0 score, the winner shall earn 3 group stage points, while the loser earns 0 group stage points.
- If the match is decided by a 2–1 score, the winner shall earn 2 group stage points, while the loser earns 1 group stage point.

The top two teams of the standings gained outright qualification to the Upper Bracket Semifinals, while the next four teams qualified for the play-ins.

=== Standings ===
Pos	Team	Pld	W	L	MF	MA	MD	Pts	Qualification
1	Blacklist International	14	13	1	26	7	+19	34	Qualified for the Upper Bracket Semifinals
2	ONIC Philippines	14	9	5	21	13	+8	27	Qualified for the Upper Bracket Semifinals
3	Nexplay EVOS	14	7	7	18	16	+2	23	Qualified for the Play-ins
4	Smart Omega	14	5	9	15	18	−3	20	Qualified for the Play-ins
5	ECHO Philippines	14	6	8	15	18	−3	19	Qualified for the Play-ins
6	RSG Philippines	14	7	7	15	19	−4	17	Qualified for the Play-ins
7	Bren Esports	14	5	9	12	21	−9	14	Eliminated
8	TNC Pro Team	14	4	10	10	20	−10	14	Eliminated

== Playoffs ==
=== Format ===
The top 6 teams at the end of regular season qualified for the playoffs. All of the playoff teams after the season were invited for the 2021 ONE Esports Invitationals, with the champion gaining outright quarterfinal slot.

The playoffs will follow a two-elimination series at the beginning and would follow a double-elimination tournament where the upper-bracket losers will descend to the lower-bracket. Playoff games would be a best-of-five tournament and the grand finals would be a best-of-seven matchup.

=== Venues ===
The six matches of the playoffs were cast at the MPL Arena Games and were held online. The final two matches, the lower bracket final and the Grand Finals, took place at World Trade Center, Pasay City and were held with no live audience.

=== Bracket ===
Play-ins
October 21, 2021 – Bo5
3	Nexplay EVOS	3
6	RSG Philippines	0
October 21, 2021 – Bo5
4	Smart Omega	3
5	ECHO Philippines	1

Upper Bracket Semifinals
October 22, 2021 – Bo5
2	ONIC Philippines	3
3	Nexplay EVOS	0
October 22, 2021 – Bo5
1	Blacklist International	1
4	Smart Omega	3
Lower Bracket Semifinal
October 23, 2021 – Bo5
3	Nexplay EVOS	0
1	Blacklist International	3

Upper Bracket Final
October 23, 2021 – Bo5
2	ONIC Philippines	3
4	Smart Omega	0
Lower Bracket Final
October 24, 2021 – Bo5
4	Smart Omega	1
1	Blacklist International	3

Grand Final
October 24, 2021 – Bo7
2	ONIC Philippines	1
1	Blacklist International	4

=== Play-ins ===
Play-ins are a best-of-5 series, the winners advanced to the Upper Bracket Semifinals, the losers were eliminated.

Team 1	Series	Team 2	Game 1	Game 2	Game 3	Game 4	Game 5
(#3) Nexplay EVOS	3–0	(#6) RSG Philippines	NXPE	NXPE	NXPE		
(#4) Omega Esports	3–1	(#5) ECHO Philippines	OMG	ECHO	OMG	OMG	

=== Upper Bracket Semifinals ===
Winners advanced to the Upper Bracket Final, losers were relegated to the Lower Bracket Semifinals.

Team 1	Series	Team 2	Game 1	Game 2	Game 3	Game 4	Game 5
(#2) ONIC Philippines	3–0	(#3) Nexplay EVOS	ONIC	ONIC	ONIC		
(#1) Blacklist International	1–3	(#4) Omega Esports	BLCK	OMG	OMG	OMG	

=== Lower Bracket Semifinals ===
An eliminator match. Winner advanced to the Lower Bracket Final.

Team 1	Series	Team 2	Game 1	Game 2	Game 3	Game 4	Game 5
(#3) Nexplay EVOS	0–3	(#1) Blacklist International	BLCK	BLCK	BLCK		

=== Upper Bracket Finals ===
Winner advanced to the Grand Final and qualified for M3 World Championships, while loser was relegated to the Lower Bracket Final.

Team 1	Series	Team 2	Game 1	Game 2	Game 3	Game 4	Game 5
(#2) ONIC Philippines	3–0	(#4) Omega Esports	ONIC	ONIC	ONIC		

=== Lower Bracket Finals ===
An eliminator match. Winner advanced to the Grand Finals, and qualified for the M3 World Championships.
Venue: World Trade Center, Pasay City

Team 1	Series	Team 2	Game 1	Game 2	Game 3	Game 4	Game 5
(#4) Omega Esports	1–3	(#1) Blacklist International	BLCK	BLCK	OMG	BLCK	

=== Grand Finals ===
Grand Finals were a best-of-seven series, both finalists represented the Philippines for the M3 World Championships.
Venue: World Trade Center, Pasay City

Team 1	Series	Team 2	Game 1	Game 2	Game 3	Game 4	Game 5	Game 6	Game 7
(#2) ONIC Philippines	1–4	(#1) Blacklist International	BLCK	ONIC	BLCK	BLCK	BLCK		

== Awards ==
=== Individual awards ===
Award	Recipient
Best Rookie of the Season	Demonkite (RSG Philippines)
Regular Season MVP	Hadji (Blacklist International)
Playoff MVP	Hadji (Blacklist International)

=== Team of the Season ===
Player	Position	Team
EDWARD	Exp-lane	Blacklist International
Kairi	Jungle	ONIC Philippines
OhMyV33Nus	Mid-lane	Blacklist International
OHEB	Gold lane	Blacklist International
Hadji	Roamer	Blacklist International
