= RSG Philippines =

Professional Esports organization based in the Philippines

- Short name: RSG PH
- Divisions: Mobile Legends: Bang Bang
- Founded: 2021
- Disbanded: 2025
- Last season: MPL Philippines Season 14
- Based in: Quezon City, Metro Manila, Philippines
- Location: Southeast Asia
- Colors: Blue Gray White
- Manager: Lexie "llexieee_" Yambao
- Championships: 2
- Division titles: MPL Season 9 (Champion); MSC 2022 Champion
- Official fan club: RSG Raiders
- Partners: Secretlab; Igamie; Realme
- Parent group: RSG Organization

RSG Philippines was a Philippine-based esports team and organization that competes in the Mobile Legends: Bang Bang Professional League in the Philippines. RSG Philippines is a direct-sister team of the Singapore-based RSG Organization.

== Mobile Legends: Bang Bang ==
=== Season 8 ===
From multiple sources from the RSG Organization based in Singapore, RSG (formerly known as Resurgence) expressed its interest on setting a RSG team in MPL Philippines Season 8 which would be transitioning to a franchise-based league system on the said season.

On 9 July 2021 via a Facebook announcement, RSG Philippines announces its signing of the Professional Player Earvin John "Heath" Esperanza, previously playing for Smart Omega.

On 14 July 2021, RSG Philippines announces its signing of the Popular Streamer and Influencer for the game MLBB, Elyson Edouard "Wrecker" Caranza.

RSG Philippines debuts in MPL PH S8 with a 2–1 result against the defending Mobile Legends World Championships or M2 World Champions Bren Esports. However, RSG Philippines would experience a fluctuating standing results, finishing the season with a 7–7 and a 15–19 match and game win–loss record, respectively.

In the playoffs, RSG Philippines would immediately be dropped in the Playoffs with a 0–3 result sweep by Nexplay EVOS.

=== Season 9 ===
After their MPL Philippines Season 8 debut, RSG Philippines would begin to sign new additions to the roster, mainly Dylan Aaron "LIGHT' Catipon and Clarense Jay "Kousei" Camilo both from TNC Pro Team. It was also announced that Iy4knu would be taking a break from MPL Philippines Season 9.

RSG Philippines ended the first week of MPL PH Season 9, having a 1-0 standings and has seeded #3 out of 8 teams.

During the day 3 of MPL Philippines Season 9 RSG Philippines successfully swept out into lower bracket the TNC Predators teams in a 3–0 victory, getting a slot for the MSC qualifier this June 7. with "Demonkite" baxia in game one and Aqua's Yve in game 2 leading the score 18 - 10 in a 12 minutes and 48 seconds match which the team will await against the fight between TNC and Smart Omega in the lower bracket.

=== ONEsports Invitational (2021) ===
The ONEsports Invitational, commonly known as Mobile Legends: Bang Bang Invitational, invited teams from the Southeast Asian region to compete against other teams from Southeast Asia. RSG Philippines were among the teams invited alongside Nexplay EVOS, Blacklist International, ONIC Philippines, Smart Omega and ECHO Philippines.

RSG Philippines would defeat their sister-group in RSG Singapore, and would defeat ECHO Philippines in the Quarterfinals. However, they would fall short and would be eliminated by the eventual champions in ONIC Esports of Indonesia.

=== SIBOL qualifiers (2022) ===
RSG Philippines, alongside Bren Esports, Nexplay EVOS, Blacklist International, ONIC Philippines, Omega Esports and ECHO Philippines were invited to qualify and compete for the Mobile Legends: Bang Bang team qualifiers for the upcoming 2021 Southeast Asian Games esports tournament for the aforementioned game.

RSG Philippines would sweep the amateur team Crowzero esport and would win in a tough 2–1 series against the super team of ECHO Philippines. RSG would defeated MONSTER ANARCHY and would face off against El Ganador Esports.

RSG Philippines would defeat Omega Esports in a 2–1 series and defeating ONIC Philippines in a 3–1 series in the second round. They would get swept 0–3 against Blacklist International and would unfortunately be eliminated from contention after a 1–3 loss against Nexplay EVOS. RSG Philippines would finish third in the entire competition.

=== Mobile Legends: Bang Bang Southeast Asia Cup (2022) ===
RSG Philippines, together with Smart Omega were invited to compete in MSC 2022 along with the ten teams in Southeast Asia. During the day 1 of MSC, the team manage to clean sweep the group brackets with the 2-0 match against the Cambodia's representative SeeYouSoon and their sister organization RSG Singapore. RSG Philippines successfully qualified in the playoffs; in their first match against the Myanmar's dark horse representative, Falcon esports where they slayed 3–1 score with the conceal plays of Emann and Light. On their second match against the Malaysia's Orange esports, they prevailed with a 3–0 score, this leads them to move forward against the Indonesia's "King of the kings " RRQ Hoshi where they fought in a 3-1 match in favor of RRQ which sent them into lower bracket against their fellow Filipino representative Smart Omega. On the first game RSG Philippines lose with an unbelievable comeback of in 12-8 match in favor of Smart Omega. The team manage to tie with a 15–11 score, on game 3 RSG Philippines manage to win with 13–13 score. During the game 4, Smart Omega leads the match with the 9–7 score which equalizes the score of both teams. In the last match against the Smart Omega, RSG Philippines takes the game with their aggressive style of play which ends in a 15–6 score, leads to fight against the upper bracket winner RRQ Hoshi. The RSG Philippines manage to defeat in their second fight in the championship match against the Indonesia's "King of the Kings" RRQ with the clean sweep 4–0 score that makes them the new champion of MSC 2022

Season 10

On week 1 of MPL Philippines Season 10, RSG Philippines got a reverse sweep 2–0 against the Smart Omega.

=== Exit ===
In January 2025, RSG announced their departure from MPL Philippines.

== Results ==
Year	MPL Philippines										Mobile Legends: Bang Bang Mid Season Cup	ONE Esports MPL Invitational	Mobile Legends: Bang Bang World Championship
Year	Season	P	W	L	MW	ML	W-L%	MW-ML%	Seed	Finish	Mobile Legends: Bang Bang Mid Season Cup	ONE Esports MPL Invitational	Mobile Legends: Bang Bang World Championship
2021	Season 8	14	7	7	15	19	.500	.441	6th	5th–6th Place; 0–3 Nexplay EVOS	Did not qualify	7th Place; 1–2 ONIC Esports	Did not qualify
2022	Season 9	14	11	3	23	9	.786	.719	1st	Grand Champions; 4–1 Smart Omega	Grand Champions; 4–0 RRQ Hoshi	3rd–4th Place; 1–2 Geek Fam ID	Did not qualify
2022	Season 10	14	9	5	20	14	.643	.588	3rd	2nd Runner-Up; 1–3 ECHO Philippines	Grand Champions; 4–0 RRQ Hoshi	3rd–4th Place; 1–2 Geek Fam ID	Did not qualify
2023	Season 11	14	7	7	17	16	.500	.515	4th	2nd Runner-Up; 2–3 ECHO Philippines	Did not qualify	Grand Champions; 3–1 ECHO Philippines	Did not qualify
2023	Season 12	14	7	7	18	17	.500	.514	4th	3rd Runner-Up; 1–3 ECHO Philippines	Did not qualify	Grand Champions; 3–1 ECHO Philippines	Did not qualify
2024	Season 13	14	9	5	20	13	.643	.606	3rd	2nd Runner-Up; 1–3 Falcons AP Bren	Did not qualify	To be determined	
2024	Season 14	14	3	11	10	23	.214	.303	7th		Did not qualify	To be determined	

Awards and achievements
Preceded by ONIC Esports	ONE Esports Invitational champions 2023	Succeeded by Defending champions
Preceded by Execration	MSC Cup champions 2022	Succeeded by ONIC Esports
Preceded by Blacklist International	MPL Philippines champions Season 9	Succeeded by Blacklist International
