= Minana EVOS =

Former professional Esports organization based in the Philippines

- Short name: MNNE
- Sport: Esports
- Folded: 2024
- Division: Mobile Legends: Bang Bang; League of Legends: Wild Rift
- Based in: Pampanga, Philippines
- Location: Southeast Asia
- Colors: Black; Cyan
- Manager: Setsuna "Dogie" Ignacio
- Partners: Sharp; Realme; Vivo; Codashop; Mountain Dew; Doritos; Gillette; Kalaro
- Parent group: EVOS Esports; Nexplay Esports; Minana Esport

Minana EVOS (MNNE) (formerly known as: Nexplay EVOS and Aether Rift) was a Filipino-based esports team. Starting in 2021, it was the result of joint collaboration of Nexplay and EVOS Esports, with Nexplay bought by Minana in 2023. At the conclusion of MPL-PH Season 13 in 2024, EVOS decided to leave the region, before Minana sold their spot to Russian organization Aurora Gaming. The team was last managed by streamer Setsuna "Dogie" Ignacio.

== Mobile Legends: Bang-Bang ==
=== History ===
==== Season 6 ====
Tristan "Yawi" Cabrera of Nexplay Esports was also reportedly one of the players who received punishment for his actions in Week One. The gesture was reportedly banned by the league right after the conclusion of Season Six when Execration, led by Jeff "S4gitnu" Subang, did the choke pose after a reverse sweep of ONIC PH in the battle for third place.

==== Season 8 ====
After the match of Nexplay EVOS against the EXE during Week 7 Day 3 of MPL- Philippines, the MPL decided to give sanction against the two teams after the match fixing happens during the tournament. The players including Yawi, Dogie, Renejay, H2wo and Yellyhaze has been disqualified from getting the Season 8 personal award collection of Mpl Philippines.

===== Season 9 =====
During the MPL Philippines Season 9 4th week, Nexplay EVOS loses by "default" after failing to reach in the venue 15 minutes before the actual game in the best of 3 match against the ECHO Philippines. In Facebook social media page of Nexplay EVOS, apologizes in their fans after the failing to enter the game last Sunday, NXPE told that the team leave the bootcamp 4 hours before the actual match but unfortunately during their trip in NLEX they experienced heavy traffic and flat tire which cost one hour before the help came.

==== Sibol Qualifiers ====
H2wo rushed to hospital after experiencing stomach pain before the game 1, this caused an hour of delay provoking the game officials to declare the first game in the best of five game in favor of Blacklist International. The head coach of Nexplay Evos John "Zico_" Dizon revealed the news in Twitter about H2wo's hospitalization "sinugod sa ospital si h2 (H2wo), kung wala kayo magandang sasabihin matulog na lang kayo p****** *** ". The overall head coach of the SIBOL, Ralph "Leathergoods" Llabares criticize Setsuna "Dogie" Ignacio comments on the rulings of the Sibol in upper bracket match last Friday, January 28, 2022. "instead of fielding in their reserve players he insist the organizers to wait for an hour as H2wo was the only jungler of Nexplay Esports", coach Leathergoods added "slap in the wrist" due to one game penalty causing the game one awarded on the Blacklist International.

After a long fight in the lower bracket Nexplay EVOS meet again the MLBB M3 Champion, Blacklist International in the finals for the national representative in 2021 Southeast Asian Games. On the game one Blacklist International dominates leading to an 18–3 final score defeating the Nexplay EVOS same on the game 2; The game 3 made a "resurgence" of Nexplay EVOS against the Blacklist International with Kenneth "Cadenza" Castro's Khufra luminous lead which ends to 14–13 score. But with the aggression of Blacklist International during game 4 and the 3 man wipeout of Nexplay EVOS in Game 5 leads to defeat of the team.

==== Season 11 ====
In 2023, it was announced that Minana Esports, an amateur team from the Philippines has just agreed on a partnership agreement with EVOS Esports. The team played as Minana EVOS for the first time during MPL Philippines Season 11.
