= Smart Omega =

Professional E-sports team based in Philippines

Smart Omega Esports
- Nicknames: Omega Esports
- Games: Dota 2; League of Legends: Wild Rift; Mobile Legends: Bang Bang; Tekken 7
- Founded: February 2019; 7 years ago
- League: The Nationals; MPL Philippines
- Team history: PLDT–Smart Omega (2019–current)
- Colors: Green, Blue
- Head coach: Pakbet and Ynot (MLBB); Dannel "Pica" Lozano (Tekken 7); Bruce "Dev1ce" Cruz (CODM)
- Parent group: PLDT Inc./Smart Communications; Sterling Global Dragons
- Website: smart.com.ph/corporate

Smart Omega Esports, formerly known as PLDT–Smart Omega, is a Philippine franchise-based professional esports team which competes in The Nationals, the top esports league in the Philippines sanctioned by the eSports National Association of the Philippines, and MPL Philippines. It was formed as a result of a partnership between esports team Sterling Global Dragons and corporate firms, PLDT Inc. and its mobile arm, Smart Communications.

== History ==
Omega was officially launched by PLDT Inc. and its mobile arm, Smart Communications in February 2019. It is a collaboration of the private firms with Sterling Global Dragons which competed in the Road to The Nationals, a tournament held by the Nationals league organizers in 2018 in order to provide a means for the pioneer teams of the league to scout players for their rosters.

The Sterling Global Dragons was the winner of the final Dota 2 tournament of the Road to The Nationals. They secured a 3–1 victory over Station 751 in the championship match of the final tournament which adopted a best-of-five series format. The Dragons qualified for the final tournament of the Road to The Nationals twice. Initially they qualified through the tournament held in Manila. However, due to a roster change they had to forfeit their qualification spot to So Lucky team and qualified again for the final competition through the Cavite qualifiers.

In 2020, the name of the team was changed to just "Smart Omega Esports".

In November 2020, Filipino pro player Hestia "the pakita kigol" signed as the team's new Dota 2 head coach.

On November 23, 2021, Smart Omega was handed a permanent ban from any Valve-sponsored events following a match fixing scandal in the Southeast Asia Dota Pro Circuit League. The ban also included current players Prince Daculan and Ryniel Keit "Zenki" Calvez, as well as previous players Patt Piolo "Piolz" Dela Cruz, Dave "Hiro" Miyata, and now-Execration player Van Jerico Manalaysay. Chris Ian "CTY" Francis Maldo, an Omega coach, was also on the list.

== Rosters ==
The following consists of the rosters of Outlaw for the 2019 The Nationals season.

=== Mobile Legends ===
==== Current roster ====
Smart Omega Mobile Legends: Bang Bang roster
Players
Coaches

Role	Handle	Name	Nationality
Exp Lane	Jeymz	Gloria, James	Philippines
Jungler	Raizen	Sumagui, Dean Christian	Philippines
Mid Lane	Hadji	Imam, Salic Aluya	Philippines
Gold Lane	Nets	Barro, Kenneth Sablande	Philippines
Roamer	Yoshinu	Romero, Czedrick	Philippines
Flex	Peuder	,	Philippines

Head coach

Hans "Wuraaaah" Solano

Assistant coach(es)

Lemuel Josh "Lembot" Lucban

Legend:
- (I) Inactive
- (S) Suspended
- Substitute
- (injured) Injury / Illness

Latest roster transaction: 18 August 2025.

==== Past Tournament Results ====
Smart Omega
Year		MPL Philippines								Moonton Accredited Competitions			ESL Competitions	
Year		P	W	L	Match W-L	W-L%	Match W-L%	Seed	Playoffs	MLBB: Mid-Season Cup	MPL Invitational	MLBB: World Championship	APAC/SEA Challenge Finals	Mobile Masters
2020	S6	13	9	4	20-10	.692	.667	2nd	First Runner Up; 2-4 Bren Esports	Did not compete	Round of 16; 0-2 Genflix Aerowolf	5th-6th Place; 0-2 Alter Ego	Not held	
2021	S7	13	6	7	15-14	.462	.517	2nd	5th-6th Place; 2-3 Execration	Did not qualify	Round of 16; 0-2 ONIC Philippines	Did not qualify	Not held	
2021	S8	14	5	9	15-18	.357	.455	4th	Second Runner Up; 1-3 Blacklist International	Did not qualify	Round of 16; 0-2 ONIC Philippines	Did not qualify	Not held	
2022	S9	14	6	8	16-20	.429	.444	6th	First Runner-Up; 1-4 RSG Philippines	Second Runner-Up; 2-3 RSG Philippines	Round of 16; 0-2 RSG Philippines	Did not qualify	Not held	
2022	S10	14	8	6	18-16	.571	.529	5th	5th-6th Place; 2-3 Bren Esports	Second Runner-Up; 2-3 RSG Philippines	Round of 16; 0-2 RSG Philippines	Did not qualify	Not held	
2023	S11	14	6	8	16-20	.429	.444	6th	5th-6th Place; 0-3 Blacklist International	Did not qualify	Did not qualify	Did not qualify	Not held	
2023	S12	14	7	7	15-17	.500	.469	6th	5th-6th Place; 0-3 RSG Philippines	Did not qualify	Did not qualify	Did not qualify	Not held	
2024	S13	14	3	11	8-23	.214	.258	7th	Did not qualify	Did not qualify	Tournament Defunct	Did not qualify	Open Finals Exit; 2-2 Swiss Record	
2024	S14	14	9	5	20-15	.643	.571	3rd	5th-6th Place; 0-3 Blacklist International	Did not qualify	Tournament Defunct	Did not qualify	Open Finals Exit; 2-2 Swiss Record	
2025	S15	14	2	12	8-25	.143	.242	8th	Did not qualify	Did not qualify	Tournament Defunct	Did not qualify	Open Finals Exit; 2-2 Swiss Record	
2025	S16	14	5	9	14-21	.357	.400	7th	Did not qualify	Did not qualify	Tournament Defunct	Did not qualify	Open Finals Exit; 2-2 Swiss Record	

=== Tekken 7 ===
- Juliano Lozano (Jules)

Coach: Dannel Lozano (Pica)

Source: Philippine Daily Inquirer

=== Call Of Duty: Mobile ===
==== Current roster ====
Smart Omega Call of Duty: Mobile roster
Players
Coaches

Handle	Name	Nationality
Kevs	Baguio, Kevin	Philippines
iDra	Mondoy, Kennedy	Philippines
Woopiiee	Regay, Jerrold	Philippines
KenDy	Pimentel, John Kenneth	Philippines
Tin	Yap Martoza, Edgar Martin	Philippines
R1sky	Buemio, Jonnel	Philippines

Head coach

Bruce "Dev1ce" Cruz

Assistant coach(es)

Jericho

Legend:
- (I) Inactive
- (S) Suspended
- Substitute
- (injured) Injury / Illness

Latest roster transaction: 28 June 2022.
