= MLBB M6 World Championship =

6th competition of Mobile Legends: Bang Bang World Championship

- 2024
- Logo

Tournament information
- Sport: Mobile Legends: Bang Bang
- Dates: 21 November–15 December 2024
- Administrator: Moonton
- Tournament format(s): Group stage Swiss System; Playoffs; Double Elimination
- Host: Malaysia
- Venue(s): Group Stage and 1st Phase of Knockouts; IOI Grand Exhibition & Convention Center; Grand Finals and 2nd Phase of Knockouts; Axiata Arena
- Teams: 16 (Swiss Stage); 8 (Wild Card)
- Purse: $1,000,000

Final positions
- Champion: Fnatic ONIC PH (1st Title)
- 1st runners-up: Team Liquid ID
- 2nd runners-up: Selangor Red Giants
- MVP: Grant "Kelra" Pillas (Fnatic ONIC Philippines)

The 2024 Mobile Legends: Bang Bang World Championship, commonly referred to as the M6 World Championship and M6, was the sixth iteration of the Mobile Legends: Bang Bang World Championship, an annual international tournament for the mobile phone MOBA game, Mobile Legends: Bang Bang organized by its developer, Moonton Games. The world championship started from November 21 until December 15, 2024.

The edition of the world series foresaw a new format in group stage by using Swiss format that challenged every team to qualify to the next round with the increased prize pool of US$1 million. The format was released on October 13, 2024, through MLBB eSports YouTube channel.

The Philippines' Fnatic ONIC Philippines won in a seven-game series against Indonesia's Team Liquid 4–1. This is the Philippines' fifth-consecutive title since M2 and the second-consecutive finals that the Philippines and Indonesia faced off.

== Background ==
The MLBB M6 World Championships was the sixth Mobile Legends: Bang Bang World Championship and the second edition of the games to be held in Malaysia, who hosted the inaugural edition M1 World Championship. The hosting was in collaboration with Malaysia's Ministry of Youth and Sports and Moonton.

The country also previously hosted the wildcard phase of the M5 tournament.

== Venues ==
Kuala Lumpur, Malaysia
Group Stage and 1st Phase Knockout Stage	2nd Phase Knockout Stage and Grand Finals
IOI Grand Exhibition & Convention Center
IOI Grand Exhibition & Convention Center	Axiata Arena
Capacity: 4,500-5,000	Capacity: 11,000-16,000
MLBB M6 World Championship is located in Malaysia

== Qualification ==
Qualifying for the M6 World Championship comes from the competing nation/region's Mobile Legends: Bang Bang Professional League or commonly known as "MPL." However, regional qualifiers in the North America, Turkey, Myanmar, China and European regions are also held to broaden the reach of the Championship's teams. A single team shall also qualify from the M6 Wildcards.

M6 has returned the number of natural qualifiers for MPL Malaysia to two qualifying teams. Instead of a singular slot, two teams from the Mekong region will now have an opportunity to redeem a spot in the group stages through the M6 Wildcard event. Turkey's Ulfhednar (formerly Fire Flux Esports) qualified for the Swiss Stage after defeating CIS' Insilio 3–0 in the Wild Card decider stage.

=== Group Stage: 28 November 2024 to 5 December 2024 ===
Similar to 2024 League of Legends World Championship and Perfect World Shanghai Major 2024, the M6 World Championships featured a Swiss-round format in the group stages.

- Round 1
  - The 16 teams will be randomly matched
  - Matches will be Bo1
- Round 2
  - The 8 teams that have 1-0 aggregate will be randomly matched
    - Matches will be Bo1
  - The 8 teams that have 0-1 aggregate will be randomly matched
    - Matches will be Bo1
- Round 3
  - The 4 teams that have 2-0 aggregate will be randomly matched
    - The winners of this round will advance to the Knockouts Stage
    - Matches will be Bo3
  - The 8 teams that have 1-1 aggregate will be randomly matched
    - Matches will be Bo1
  - The 4 teams that have 0-2 aggregate will be randomly matched
    - The losers of this round will be eliminated from the tournament
    - Matches will be Bo3
- Round 4
  - The 6 teams that have 2-1 aggregate will be randomly matched
    - The winners of this round will advance to the Knockouts Stage
    - Matches will be Bo3
  - The 6 teams that have 1-2 aggregate will randomly match
    - The losers of this round will be eliminated from the tournament
    - Matches will be Bo3
- Round 5
  - The 6 teams that have 2-2 aggregate will be randomly matched
    - The winners of this round will advance to the Knockouts Stage
    - The losers of this match will be eliminated from the tournament
    - Matches will be Bo3

=== Knockout Stage: 7–15 December 2024 ===
- Double Elimination Bracket
  - All matches are played in a Bo5 series. Upper bracket quarterfinals are played in a Bo3.
  - Grand Finals will be played in a Bo7.

Region	League	Qualification method	Team name	ID
Philippines	MPL Philippines	MPL Philippines Season 14 Champions	(Philippines) Fnatic ONIC PH	FNOP
Philippines	MPL Philippines	MPL Philippines Season 14 Runners-Up	(Philippines) Aurora Gaming	RORA
Indonesia	MPL Indonesia	MPL Indonesia Season 14 Champions	(Indonesia) Team Liquid ID	TLID
Indonesia	MPL Indonesia	MPL Indonesia Season 14 Runners-Up	(Indonesia) RRQ Hoshi	RRQ
Malaysia	MPL Malaysia	MPL Malaysia Season 14 Champions	(Malaysia) Selangor Red Giants	SRG
Malaysia	MPL Malaysia	MPL Malaysia Season 14 Runners-Up	(Malaysia) Team Vamos	VM
Latin America	MPL LATAM	MPL LATAM Season 2 Champions	(Argentina) Maycam Evolve	EV
Singapore	MPL Singapore	MPL Singapore Season 8 Champions	(Singapore) NIP Flash	NPFL
Cambodia	MPL Cambodia	MPL Cambodia Season 7 Champions	(Cambodia) CFU Gaming	CFU
Middle East and North Africa	MPL MENA	MPL MENA Season 6 Champions	(Saudi Arabia) Twisted Minds	TWIS
Myanmar	M6 Myanmar Qualifier	M6 Myanmar Qualifier Champions	(Myanmar) Falcon Esports	FCON
Turkiye	MTC Turkiye Championship	MLBB Türkiye Şampiyonası Season 4 Champions	(Turkey) S2G Esports	S2G
Turkiye	M6 Wildcard Qualifiers	M6 Wildcard Qualifying Team	(Turkey) Ulfhednar	ULF
North America	North America Challenger Tournament	MLBB NACT Fall Season 2024 Champions	(United States) BloodThirstyKings	BTK
Eastern Europe and Central Asia	MLBB Continental Championships	MLBB Continental Championships Season 4 Champions	(Commonwealth of Independent States) Team Spirit	TS
China	M6 China Qualifiers	M6 China Qualifier Champions	(China) KeepBest Gaming	KBG

=== Wildcard Groups ===
The M6 Wild Card tournament was a qualifying tournament for the champions and runner-ups of other MLBB domestic tournaments. The winning team, Ulfhednar, qualified for the group stages of MLBB M6 World Championship.

The M6 World Championship was the second edition to include a wild card round. South Asia has now been removed from the Wildcards.

- Wildcard Groups: 21 to 24 November 2024
  - Eight teams will be randomly drawn into two groups
  - Single Round Robin, all matches are played in Bo3
  - Top 1 team from each group advance to Decider Stage
- Crossover Match: 24 November 2024
  - First placer of one group will compete in a Bo5 against the first placer from the other group.
  - Winner of the crossover match will advance to Group Stage.
  - Loser will be eliminated.

Region	League	Qualification method	Team name	ID	Group
Mekong Region	MCC Mekong	MCC Mekong S4 Champions	(Vietnam) Legion Esports	LG	B
Mekong Region	MCC Mekong	MCC Mekong S4 Runners-Up	(Laos) Niightmare Esports	NM	A
Eastern Europe and Central Asia	MLBB Continental Championships	MLBB Continental Championships Season 4 Runners-Up	(Commonwealth of Independent States) Insilio	INS	B
Latin America	MPL LATAM	MPL LATAM Season 2 Runners-Up	(Brazil) RRQ Akira	RRQA	B
Turkiye	MTC Turkiye Championship	MLBB Türkiye Şampiyonası Season 4 Runners-Up	(Turkey) Ulfhednar (Note: Ulfhednar acquired the roster of Fire Flux Esports)	ULF	A
Middle East and North Africa	MPL MENA	MPL MENA Season 6 Runners-Up	(Saudi Arabia) Geekay Esports	GK	A
China	M6 China Qualifiers	M6 China Qualifier Runners-Up	(China) DFYG	DFYG	A
Mongolia	ENC MLBB Mongolia	ENC MLBB Mongolia Champions	(Mongolia) The MongolZ	MGLZ	B

== Roster(s) ==
With Turkish representatives Ulfhednar winning the decider match of the Wild Card stage, they qualified for the Swiss Stage. This is the first time that the Turkish Region had two representatives competing in the main stage of the World Championships.

=== Swiss Stage ===
Region	Team Name	Roster								
Region	Team Name	Coaching Staff(s)			Main Five					Sixth Man
Region	Team Name	Head Coach	Assistant Coach	Analyst	Exp	Jungle	Mid	Gold	Roam	Sixth Man
Philippines	Fnatic ONIC Philippines	Ynot (Anthony Senedrin)	YellyHaze (Jeniel Bata-Anon)	TBA	Kirk (Jann Kirk Gutierrez)	K1NGKONG (King Cyric Perez)	Super Frince (Frince Miguel Ramirez)	Kelra (Grant Duane Pillas)	Brusko (Borris James Parro)	SpiderMilez (Brain Milez Santos)
Philippines	Aurora Gaming	Master the Basics (Aniel Jiandani)	Dex Star (Dexter Louise Alaba)		Edward (Edward Jay Dapadap)	Demonkite (Jonard Cedrix Caranto)	Yue (Kenneth Carl Tadeo)	Domeng (Jan Dominic Delmundo)	Renejay (Renejay Barcase)	Benthings (Ben Seloe Maglaque)
Indonesia	Team Liquid ID	SaintDeLucaz (Doly Van Pelo)	Pahlevi (Muhammad Reza Pahlevi)	Facehugger (Usep Satiawan)	Aran (Aldhia Fahmi Aranda)	Faviannn (Favian Bayu Putra)	Yehezkiel (Yehezkiel Wiseman)	AeronnShikii (Sultan Muhammad)	Widy (Christian Widy Hartono)	Kabuki (Leonardo Prasetyo Agung)
Indonesia	RRQ Hoshi	Khezcute (Alfi Syahrin Nelphyana)	TBA	NMM (Rasyid Kevin Perwira)	Dyrennn (Rendy Syahputra)	Sutsujin (Arthur Sunarkho)	Rinz (Hajirin Arafat)	Skylar (Schevenko David Tendean)	idok (Said Ali Ridho)	Hazle (Muhammad Praba Balakosa)
Malaysia	Selangor Red Giants	Arcadia (Michael Angelo Bocado)	TBA	OzoraVeki (Poon Kok Sing)	Kramm (Mark Genzon Sojero Rusiana)	Sekys (Muhammad Haqqullah bin Ahmad Shahrul Zaman)	Stormie (Hazziq Danish bin Mohamad Rizwan)	Innocent (John Vincent Banal)	Yums (Muhammad Qayyum Ariffin bin Mohd Suhairi)	Gojes (Ilman Zareef bin Zulkifli)
Malaysia	Team Vamos	Pabz (Khairul Azman bin Mohd Sharif)	TBA	Paoweeburn (Paolo Lobaton)	Smooth (Aeliff Adam bin Mohd Ariff)	Chibi (Muhammad Nazhan bin Mohd Nor)	Warlord (Rizky Agustian)	Nets (Kenneth Sablande Barro)	Xorn (Mohammad Zul Hisham bin Mohd Noor)	Sepat (Muhammad Irfan bin Aujang)
Singapore	NIP Flash	Kayzeepi (Eugene Kong)	TBA	Zarate (Joseph Yeo)	Diablo (Yeo Wee Lun)	Hadess (Jaymark Aaron Lazaro)	KurtTzy (Jankurt Russel Matira)	Vanix (Keith Lim Wei Jun)	JPL (Akihiro Furusawa)	Lolsie (Bellmay Yeov)
Cambodia	CFU Gaming	T1m3go (Gesang Jiacuo)	NorthKing (Vengthong Te)	Bob (Dok Phengphirak)	Wadu (Vann Dane)	Detective (Nhem Chandavan)	Zee (Cheang Piseth)	Xingg (Khoun Amey)	Oppi (Chhuon Phengkong)	Tegami (Rin Chanthana)
North America	BloodThirstyKings	PikaDiff (Steve Tran)	TBA		FwydChickn (Ian Hohl)	MobaZane (Michael Cosgun)	Hoon (Jang Seong-hun)	ZIA (Ziameth-Jei Caluya)	Shark (Vo Trung)	Tea
CIS	Team Spirit	Vren (Vrendon Lim)	TBA		Kid Bomba (Mathaios Panagiotis Chatzilakos)	ONESHOT (Alexander Sharkov)	Sunset Lover (Kemiran Kochkarov)	Hiko (Pak Anton Igorevich)	SAWO (Stanislav Reshnyak)	Jady Euphoria
Turkey	S2G Esports	demigod	Pao (Ren Paolo Villanueva)	arion (Uğurcan Arslan)	Lunar (Mehmet Ibrahim Ilgun)	Kazue (Mehmed Akif Öztürk)	Begin (Emir Gözcü)	Sigibum (Şiyar Akbulut)	Pagu (Lukasz Bigus)	Boranxcalgar
Turkey	Ulfhednar	Badgalseph (Sacit Arslan)	TBA	Ospreay (Vladimir Gonchar)	Alien (Bariş Ali Çakır)	Tienzy (Sidar Menteşe)	Rosa (Ahmet Batır)	Sunshine (Emre Sarı)	APEX47 (Furkan Akbulut)	Lonely Kid (Gürkan Sorkun)
South America	Maycam Evolve	El Viejo (Maximiliano Omar Aragona)	TBA		Markinho (Marcó Dario Colque)	AURORAA (Juan Sebastian Tello)	Feshin (Juan Jose Rafael)	Yur (Matias Ezequiel Vargas)	Super Nahuel	Mattt
MENA	Twisted Minds	Lyrick (Hendrich Clahi)	TBA		Sanji (Ayman Othman Alqarni)	7oda (Mahmoud Ayman Youssef)	Cuffin (Muath Saad Alkoraini)	Saano (Sulaiman Musallam Alrashdi)	Trolll (Moayed Ayman Kharaba)	Tarzan (Mohammed Kharabah) Mike Sama (Ren Consulta Diong)
China	KeepBest Gaming	Webby (Chen Jiawei)	TBA	Spirit (Wang Jiaqi)	WindReturn	Saxa (Kenneth De Pedro Fedelin)	LMU (Shen Yuan)	BeLexi	Tracy (Damasco Tracy Danielle)	Tides (Yang Shangteng) Siyu (Gao Yifan)
Myanmar	Falcon Esports	Kalama (Kaung Htet Oo)	Jina (Kaung Htet Oo)	Ar Sy (Rodel B. Cruz)	Royal Milk (Arkar Bhone Pyae)	Daxx (Kaung Sett)	Px7 (Yar Zar Mon)	Beni (Min Swan Kon)	KidX (Yehtet Sithu)	Sanji

=== Wild Card Stage ===
Several teams from the MLBB M5 World Championships make their return in the wild card stage while a portion of the teams are newly qualified to the world championships. Ulfhednar was formerly known as Fire Flux Esports before a rebranding effort and RRQ Akira returns as LATAM's runners-up. Niightmare Esports most recently qualified during the M4 World Championships.

Region	Team Name	Roster								
Region	Team Name	Coaching Staff(s)			Main Five					Sixth Man
Region	Team Name	Head Coach	Assistant Coach	Analyst	Exp	Jungle	Mid	Gold	Roam	Sixth Man
Vietnam	Legion Esports	Sabo (Arkar Pho Min)	TBA	Moaii	Meow (Nguyễn Đức Nam)	Jowga (Nguyễn Văn Tô Đô)	Hehehehehehe (Lâm Văn Đạt)	Daylight. (Nguyễn Việt Anh)	GNART (Phạm Ngọc Trạng)	1ManCarry (Lê Minh Đức)
Laos	Niightmare Esports	Xs0n	TBA	Alain (Sathaphone Kayavong)	Opper (Phonespaseuth Lotchanakane)	Lexxyboiiz (Mongkonethong Sinbandit)	Sosoul (Phonesana Inthavongxay)	Khammy (Kahampaseuth Hanxana)	J4ZBIN (Sengathit Phounsavat)	Ninjaaa / Ipedd
CIS	Insilio	Giee (Karl Barrientos)	TBA	Krankov	Maniak (Stepan Mikhaylov)	Yustinian (Markov Aleksandr Anatolievich)	Reaper (Amir Ismailov Takhirovich)	'Don't (Dolgushin Vadim Vadimovich)	Lovely (Rozmovny Matvey Alexandrovich)	Harmony Soul / Kid Goldi
Turkey	Ulfhednar	Badgalseph (Sacit Arslan)	Ospereay (Vladimir Gonchar)	Badgalseph (Sacit Arslan)	Alien (Bariş Ali Çakır)	Tienzy (Sidar Menteşe)	Rosa (Ahmet Taha Batır)	Sunshine (Emre Sarı)	APEX47 (Furkan Akbulut)	Lonely Kid / Finarfin
South America	RRQ Akira	Cabral (Godman Campos Dos Santos Cabral)	TBA		Tekashi (Arthur Silva do Nascimento)	Kiing (Lucas Felipe De Oliveira Godoy)	Seigen (Matheus Vieira Lima)	Gustalagusta (Gustavo Da Costa Lima)	Luiizz (Luiz Henrique da Silva Alves)	Blink (Gabriel da Silva Favoreto)
China	DianFengYaoGuai	Sasa (Lu Khai Bean)	N/A	Loong (Saw Kee Loong)	Kielvj (Kiel Vj Hernandez Cruzem)	zzzed (Liu Chenjian)	Yione (Lin Haifeng)	Loong (Tang Zelong)	Flash	TBA
China	DianFengYaoGuai	Sasa (Lu Khai Bean)	N/A	Loong (Saw Kee Loong)	Huisu	zzzed (Liu Chenjian)	Yione (Lin Haifeng)	Loong (Tang Zelong)	Pxiu	TBA
MENA	Geekay Esports	Yakou (John Erwin Magno)	N/A	N/A	Samo (Samhar Kelani)	Xeno (Anand Baatarkhu)	Feng	Carvi (Carl Vincent Tinio)	Shen (Mohammed Elshanawany)	Smile (Ahmed Mohsen Ahmed Fawzy Moustafa)
Mongolia	The MongolZ	Booyo	N/A	N/A	bankai (Erkhembayar Batkhuu)	Zetsu (Bilguun Zagd-Ochir)	Mayki (Lkhagvasuren Otgonbayar)	Rynx (Tsogtsaikhan Nyamtsogt)	Shenlynn (Turbayar Bulgan)	MuMu
Mongolia	The MongolZ	Booyo	N/A	N/A	bankai (Erkhembayar Batkhuu)	Zetsu (Bilguun Zagd-Ochir)	Mayki (Lkhagvasuren Otgonbayar)	Rynx (Tsogtsaikhan Nyamtsogt)	Shenlynn (Turbayar Bulgan)	Beckyrmaaa

== Swiss Stage ==
=== Bracket ===
All bracket stage matches were either a Best of 1 or Best of 3. The winning team will qualify in the upper portion of the Swiss bracket until the first top two teams whom have an undefeated record advance to the knockout stage. Three teams would follow suit and will qualify in the second round of qualifiers and the final three teams with a 3–2 record will qualify for the knockouts.

Every round featured a random draw by the players themselves to determine the succeeding matchups. Both Malaysian representatives took significant defeats against underdog regions in Turkey and MENA when S2G Esports defeated MSC 2024 champions Selangor Red Giants and Twisted Minds defeating MPL Malaysia's runner-up Team Vamos. The Philippines and Indonesia have equal numbers of teams in the 1-0 and 0-1 brackets with Fnatic ONIC Philippines and RRQ Hoshi in the 1-0 bracket and Aurora Gaming and Team Liquid ID in the lower half.

This series of the world championship became the first since the M1 World Championships that the Philippines only has one remaining contestant in the competition prior to the knockout stage after the 2–0 sweep by Team Liquid ID at Aurora Gaming. This series also was the second-consecutive world championships that North America will fail to qualify for knockouts. The last time it qualified was during the M4 World Championships.

Advance to knockouts
2–0	RRQ Hoshi
1–0	BloodThirstyKings	1	Fnatic ONIC Philippines
0–0	Falcon Esports	0	Fnatic ONIC Philippines	2	Advance to knockouts
KeepBest Gaming	0	Twisted Minds	1	RRQ Hoshi	2	2–1	Falcon Esports
RRQ Hoshi	1	S2G Esports	0	Twisted Minds	1	Falcon Esports	2	NIP Flash
Falcon Esports	1	BloodThirstyKings	1	BloodThirstyKings	1	Team Spirit
Aurora MLBB	0	RRQ Hoshi	1	1–1	Twisted Minds	1	Advance to knockouts
Ulfhednar	0	Team Spirit	0	CFU Gaming	1	NIP Flash	2	2–2	Team Vamos
BloodThirstyKings	1	CFU Gaming	0	Team Vamos	0	CFU Gaming	1	Team Vamos	2	Selangor Red Giants
Team Spirit	1	Fnatic ONIC Philippines	1	Falcon Esports	1	Team Spirit	2	BloodThirstyKings	0	Team Liquid ID
Maycam Evolve	0	Selangor Red Giants	0	Selangor Red Giants	2
Twisted Minds	1	0–1	NIP Flash	1	1–2	CFU Gaming	1	Eliminated
Team Vamos	0	KeepBest Gaming	0	S2G Esports	0	Aurora MLBB	0	Twisted Minds	0	BloodThirstyKings
Team Liquid ID	0	Team Liquid ID	1	Team Liquid ID	0	Team Liquid ID	2	Team Liquid ID	2	CFU Gaming
Fnatic ONIC Philippines	1	NIP Flash	1	Team Spirit	1	KeepBest Gaming	0	Twisted Minds
NIP Flash	0	Aurora MLBB	0	Selangor Red Giants	2	Eliminated
CFU Gaming	1	ULFHEDNAR	0	0–2	S2G Esports	0	S2G Esports
S2G Esports	1	Selangor Red Giants	1	Aurora MLBB	2	Team Vamos	2	KeepBest Gaming
Selangor Red Giants	0	Maycam Evolve	0	ULFHEDNAR	0	Aurora MLBB
Team Vamos	1	Maycam Evolve	0	Eliminated
KeepBest Gaming	2	Maycam Evolve
ULFHEDNAR

== M6 Wild Card ==
=== Draw ===
On November 8, a draw for the competing wild card teams were done to determine the groups of all eight wild card teams. The draw was officiated by former Malaysian caster-turned-host Aiman "Laphel" Kamal alongside the Deputy Minister of the Ministry of Youth and Sports Adam Adli and Moonton Games representative Fkri Rizal Mahruddin.

The eight teams were grouped through random picks in the wild card draw and whoever wins the wild card qualifying tournament will qualify in the Swiss Stage to go up against North America's BloodThirstyKings.

Results of the Wild Card Draw
Group A	Group B
Geekay Esports	The MongolZ
DianFengYaoGuai	Legion Esports
Niightmare Esports	Insilio
Ulfhednar	RRQ Akira

=== Group Stage ===
All teams will play a single-round robin match where all will be a Best of 3. Only the top 1 team will move on to the decider stage — the bracket to determine the final wild card team qualifying for the Swiss stage.

==== Group A ====
Pos	Team	Pld	W	L	GF	GA	GD	Pts	Qualification
1	Ulfhednar	3	3	0	6	1	+5	6	Decider Stage
2	DianFengYaoGuai	3	2	1	5	3	+2	5	
3	Niightmare Esports	3	1	2	2	5	−3	4	
4	Geekay Esports	3	0	3	2	6	−4	3	

Updated to match(es) played on unknown. Source:

==== Group B ====
Pos	Team	Pld	W	L	GF	GA	GD	Pts	Qualification
1	Insilio	3	2	1	5	3	+2	5	Decider Stage
2	RRQ Akira	3	2	1	4	3	+1	5	
3	Legion Esports	3	1	2	3	4	−1	4	
4	The MongolZ	3	1	2	3	5	−2	4	

Updated to match(es) played on unknown. Source:

==== Group A Matches ====
Date	Team	Results	Team
November 21	DFYG	2 – 1	NME
November 21	ULF	2 – 0	GKE
November 22	DFYG	2 – 0	GKE
November 22	ULF	2 – 0	NME
November 23	NME	1 – 2	GKE
November 23	ULF	2 – 1	DFYG

==== Group B Matches ====
Date	Team	Results	Team
November 21	LGE	0 – 2	INS
November 21	RRQA	2 – 0	MNZ
November 22	MNZ	1 – 2	INS
November 22	RRQA	0 – 2	LGE
November 23	MNZ	2 – 1	LGE
November 23	RRQA	2 – 1	INS

== Knockout Stage ==
Upper Bracket Quarterfinals (Best of 3)	Upper Bracket Semifinals (Best of 5)	Upper Bracket Finals (Best of 5)	Grand Finals (Best of 7)
Match 1 (Dec 7 - 14:00 (UTC+08:00))
Falcon Esports	2
Match 5 (Dec 8 - 15:00 (UTC+08:00))
NIP Flash	0
Falcon Esports	2
Match 2 (Dec 7 - 16:00 (UTC+08:00))
Fnatic ONIC Philippines	3
Fnatic ONIC Philippines	2
Match 11 (Dec 11 - 19:00 (UTC+08:00))
Selangor Red Giants	0
Fnatic ONIC Philippines	3
Match 3 (Dec 7 - 18:00 (UTC+08:00))
Team Liquid ID	1
RRQ Hoshi	2
Match 6 (Dec 8 - 18:00 (UTC+08:00))
Team Vamos	1
RRQ Hoshi	2
Match 4 (Dec 7 - 20:00 (UTC+08:00))
Team Liquid ID	3
Team Spirit	0	Match 14 (Dec 15 - 17:00 (UTC+08:00))
Team Liquid ID	2	Fnatic ONIC Philippines	4
Team Liquid ID	1
Lower Bracket Play-Ins (Best of 5)	Lower Bracket Quarterfinals (Best of 5)	Lower Bracket Semifinals (Best of 5)	Lower Bracket Finals (Best of 5)
Match 9 (Dec 11 - 11:00 (UTC+08:00))
Match 7 (Dec 10 - 15:00 (UTC+08:00))	Falcon Esports	1	Match 13 (Dec 14 - 19:00 (UTC+08:00))
Team Vamos	1	Team Spirit	3	Match 12 (Dec 14 - 14:00 (UTC+08:00))	Team Liquid ID	3
Team Spirit	3	Team Spirit	0	Selangor Red Giants	0
Match 10 (Dec 11 - 15:00 (UTC+08:00))	Selangor Red Giants	3
Match 8 (Dec 10 - 18:00 (UTC+08:00))	RRQ Hoshi	1
NIP Flash	0	Selangor Red Giants	3
Selangor Red Giants	3

Coming into the knockout stage, many have dubbed M6 as an unpredictable tournament as many rising regions pulls off upsets from established powerhouses. Falcon Esports swept Singapore's NIP Flash who finished fourth in the M3 World Championships while both Malaysian representatives fell to the lower bracket after losing to the Philippines and Indonesia.

Team Vamos would suffer a 3–1 early playoff exit to CIS' Team Spirit who would pull of the same result to Falcon Esports in the lower bracket quarterfinals. Meanwhile, Selangor Red Giants crawled its way from the play-ins to the lower bracket finals when it defeated Team Spirit in a 3–0 sweep.

In the lower-bracket finals, Indonesia's Team Liquid ID won in a 3–0 sweep against the Malaysian champions Selangor Red Giants, setting the stage for another Philippines vs. Indonesia Grand Finale. This was come just short of a year cycle of Philippines vs. Indonesia Grand Final in M5 (ONIC Esports vs. AP Bren).

== Grand Finals ==
2024 MLBB M6 World Championship Grand Finals
Fnatic ONIC Philippines		Team Liquid Indonesia
4	Grand Finals	1
- Date: December 15, 2024
- Venue: Axiata Arena, Kuala Lumpur
- Purse: US$1,000,000 (equivalent to $1,026,307 in 2025)
- Attendance: 7,000
- MVP: Grant Duane "Kelra" Pillas

Live Broadcast
- Broadcast(s): English Tagalog Bahasa Indonesia
- Announcers: English Eugene "ABSTRACT" Eu; Rachel "Aeterna" Nalapraya; Bridgette "Brigida" Ramos; Aleksandr "Destroyer" Timofeev; Gideon Khew "Gideonq" Wei Yung; Mohammad Amirul "Laphel" Aiman bin Mohammad Kamal; Dan "Leo" Cubangay; Frederick "Mirko" Handy Loho; JC "Naisou" Rezabek; Renmar "Reptar" Santa Cruz H.B. "Trex" Wagner
- Viewers: 4,129,026 (Peak Viewership Live)

=== Announcements ===
Prior to the Best of 7 series, Moonton Games played a clip celebrating the successes and achievements of Mobile Legends in its eight years of publication. The major news that broke during the announcement period was the official launch of Mobile Legends: Bang Bang to Moonton Games' homeland China. Prior to 2024, Mobile Legends in the Eastern Giant had not been released for several reasons including its steep competition with its computer counterpart League of Legends. However, in January 2025, Mobile Legends is set to be released formally to nearly 1.4 billion people residing in China.

After the launch announcement of MLBB to China, the Esports World Cup Federation also announced that Mobile Legends: Bang Bang will remain a part of the Esports World Cup in 2025.

Following the EWC's announcement, Mobile Legends: Bang Bang introduced a remarketed logo for the game alongside a new world championship competition, the Magic Chess Go Go World Championship which will be occurring by next year.

==== MLBB M7 World Championship ====
The Deputy Minister of Youth and Sports of Malaysia Adam Adli Abdul Halim joined the hosts of M6 onstage to announce the venue for the M7 World Championship. However, it was confirmed that the venue for the Grand Finale will take its sights back to Indonesia. It has been confirmed that M7 will be the first multi-national held event with certain phases of the tournament being hosted in certain parts of the MLBB ecosystem.

=== Game 1 ===
Game 1 showcased both teams' early game slow-scaling effort as gold leads were traded left and right, with it not rising to nine hundred as the mid-game arrived. After FNOP's Kirk drew first blood to TLID's roamer Widdy, it became a 2 for-1 situation as FNOP took down two players in Widy and Aran, but TLID's Jungler Faviannn took the neutral turtle objective at 3:36.

In the potential skirmish for the second-turtle take, Team Liquid ID transitioned to micro-gameplay as they scattered across the map. Faviann was the catalyst for pushing the top and bottom tier one turret that gave TLID a slight gold advantage despite FNOP taking the second turtle of the game at 6:13. Widdy would fall to Kelra, and Faviann would slay Kelra back however, it was a 3-1 trade of kills with FNOP taking down Widdy, Faviann, and Aeronshikii while TLID only took down Kelra. It was a significant win for FNOP in terms of gameplay because TLID traded a Jungler, a Gold Laner, and a Roamer—two backcourt and one frontcourt hero—for a singular Gold Laner—this disabled TLID's ability to defend their top lane as Kirk pushed the first-tier turret.

K1NGKONG was able to dish out a retribution battle between him and Faviann for the first Lord take at 8:10. A glorious pathway set by Aran made it clear that TLID was going full-on brawl mode and decimate the scattered FNOP squad; however, after a massive play by Brusko to stun and knock up three crucial members of TLID, FNOP won a 2-man kill for a wipeout.

From that point, the game would be one-sided at FNOP's gold lead, which grew to nearly 6.5k by 10:00. TLID wouldn't have second-tier turrets by this time. FNOP would also get the only evolved Lord in the match as, by 12:37, their lead had grown from 6.5k to 7.9k as they pressured TLID at home, taking all three inhibitor turrets. After a diversion play from Super Frince that killed 2 TLID players, Kelra finished the game at 14:03.

=== Game 2 ===
Game 2 began a potential comeback for TLID when Kirk was caught at a mid-health level during an early game potential pickoff. With 1:37 into the game and the turtle yet to spawn, K1NGKONG forces Widy to utilize his flicker early into the game, setting a 2-minute cooldown for the battle spell. This is compared with the 32-second retribution cooldown for Junglers.

As the first turtle spawns into the map at 2:00, a crucial mid-lane play from FNOP pushes Widy, Aran, and Yehezkiel into their first-tier turrets. However, Faviann on the Joy began a counterattack from behind, and the health bars of FNOP's members slowly crumbled. TLID had a 359 gold lead by this time as FNOP started to the turtle. Aran would take the early first-blood take when Super Frince fell to Phoveus' hands but K1NGKONG still evenly traded for the turtle.

TLID held their largest lead in the series yet at 1.7k at 4:40 into the game. Aran capitalized on their position but failed to capitalize on the backup as TLID's members focused on the turtle take. In a disengage effort by TLID, an AOG set by Brusko took Yehezkiel down in a trade for Kirk. However, Widy would fall to Kelra's hands as K1NGKONG capitalized on the absence of Faviann, taking the second turtle of the game and diminishing TLID's lead. It was a mid-laner and a roamer for an exp-laner and the turtle trade.

Widy and Faviann would fall in their bottom Jungle side despite getting a great look and knocking up both Frince and Brusko. Despite their low HP levels, FNOP stayed unscathed as another wipeout for TLID was pulled off by the yellow porcupines at 6:36. At 10:43 into the game, FNOP could take the first lord of the match. By this time, TLID has yet to respond in a proper capitalization of Game 2 at FNOP and holds a 7.9k gold lead over the squad. FNOP was pressuring TLID all this time as Aran fell in a crucial base defense. All Inhibitor turrets have fallen, and FNOP ended the game at 11:50.

=== Game 3 ===
Game 3's draft was a comfort pick showcase by MPL Indonesia's champions; however, K1NGKONG would pick on first blood in the first minute of the match on Widy's Carmilla. Faviann would take the first turtle of the game. However, Kirk's attempt at a back door play to pick off Widy was abysmal as TLID picks off Kirk at 2:19 without FNOP making a trade for it.

At 3:13, Kirk would get picked off for the second time after Favian and Aran attacked Kirk's hero inside its turret. The team would trade off Widy for a kill as the gold lead remains stagnant. TLID's plan of pushing FNOP just enough to avoid a contest on the turtle worked despite Aran falling to the hands of Brusko. Faviann would still get the second turtle of the game in that microplay. Despite an AOG set by Brusko, Faviann was able to capitalize on the low HP bar of Brusko to take a turtle and kill trade. Yet, he doesn't stop there and grabs his triple kill of the series, pulling Kelra and Kirk with Brusko to capitalize on the massive gold advantage and victory for TLID.

In an attempt to grab a Maniac play from Faviann, it was just enough time for K1NGKONG to outplay Faviann's moves to get him picked off by Kirk in the top lane. Aran would get killed on the bottom lane after Kelra pushed it to the first turret. Yehezkiel's zone-out effort in the middle bush at 6:56 for the third and final turtle take proved to pay dividends as TLID took the third turtle as well as a pick-off kill from K1NGKONG. At 7:28, the fight was prolonged as positions from both teams materialized into crucial pickoffs. Kelra was able to take out Widy, but Yehezkiel killed Kelra in the final moments before he was taken out by the burst magic damage caused by the Harith. However, Faviann on the backline, killed Brusko, who was in critical health levels, but he was traded for Aran. It wouldn't stop there as Kirk's onslaught of vengeance pushed through. He killed Faviann inside their first-tier turret to go for a 4 for two kills. Kirk would still get killed at the end.

The first lord take materialized for TLID as the team successfully zoned out crucial members, including K1NGKONG, from retributing the lord from Faviann. A crucial pick-off from Kelra and a pre-death from Kirk just moments prior to the lord's take made it seem impossible for FNOP to contest the lord. TLID capitalized on this outnumbered scenario for FNOP, and TLID has built up its largest gold lead in the series, yet at 2.7k gold. Kelra gets taken down at 12:58, and a death sonata play comes in from TLID that immobilizes three of FNOP's players, which turned into four, with Super Frince unable to get back to their base. TLID regains its momentum to force Game 5.

=== Game 4 ===
Game 4 is again a Fnatic ONIC Philippines rebound as they open the game in a 1-0 kill pickoff. Fnatic ONIC Philippines' composition focuses on pickoffs after pickoffs through their scaling mechanics and individual skillset. In contrast, Team Liquid Indonesia focuses on a lineup that needs to snowball damages and take neutral objectives to contest an even playing field with Fnatic ONIC Philippines.

In just 5 minutes into the Game, K1NGKONG had already put pressure on Faviann and Yehezkiel in the middle lane alongside their bottom right corner jungle. After a set by Widy at 6:37, Kirk would pick off two from TLID, including Widy and Aran, while K1NGKONG dashes in and out of players from TLID to pick off Yehezkiel and a pickoff for Kelra on Aeronshikii. It was a 4-for-nothing kill trade for FNOP.

FNOP's early game lead and a subsequent trounce on TLID during the mid-game forced the Indonesian squad back to their base at 10:18 into the match. Kelra sniped Aeronshikii, who was trying to set up a damaged play with Claude's signature skill. FNOP extended their lead three games to 1 after securing the largest gold lead in the series thus far at 14.8k gold. Game 4 was also the fastest game in all of M6 at 10:34 seconds.

=== Game 5 ===
After another close early game from both teams, Team Liquid ID remains its composure during every skirmish FNOP launches at them. These include the 9:48 take on the lord which TLID capitalize in taking nearly three lives of FNOP's roster. Regardless of the pickoffs, FNOP remains to be in the lead at times due to their critical neutral objective takes. However, after a successfully calculated real world manipulation by Super Frince, FNOP brawled out and went in for the kill that nearly wiped out the entire roster of TLID–a 3 for 1 trade–sends this game into total control for FNOP.

A crucial shadow kill use from Faviann sends him to his untimely demise when Kelra's sphere connected with his shadow teleport, killing Faviann in a potential comeback for TLID when defending their base. This comes in handy for the Filipino squad as they got the second lord of the game during his absence. In another calculated play on the blue-side jungle of TLID, they traded another kill but to FNOP's advantage as they only lost Brusko and took the lord while TLID lost both of their frontline heroes.

TLID's momentum never materialized from their early game advantage as FNOP was able to capitalize on their crucial positions to win the Philippines its fifth-consecutive world title.

== Record(s) ==
During the Lower Bracket Quarter Final match between Selangor Red Giants (SRG) and Rex Regum Qeon Hoshi (RRQ), John Vincent "Innocent" Banal delivered a historic performance on the hero Granger in Game 3, tallying 19 kills to set the all-time single-game kills record in the M-Series – coincidentally against the previous record holder, Schevenko David "Skylar" Tendean of RRQ.

During the upper bracket finals, Fnatic ONIC Philippines pulled a rare feat of attaining a nearly 15,000-gold lead during Game 1 against Team Liquid ID. They finished the fastest game in the upper bracket at 10 minutes 53 seconds, just three seconds faster than Team Vamos' match against RRQ Hoshi during the quarterfinals.

== Marketing ==
=== Viewership ===
The MLBB World Championships has been monitored by the website Esports Charts for its live viewership matches for the M6 World Championships. The following matches have been the most-watched series by live viewers for this tournament.

Bold Face - Denotes the team won that specific game

Date	Stage	Matchup	Peak viewership
December 15, 2024	Grand Finals	Fnatic ONIC Philippines vs. Team Liquid ID	4,017,454
December 8, 2024	Upper Bracket Semifinals	RRQ Hoshi vs. Team Liquid ID	3,574,108
December 7, 2024	Upper Bracket Quarterfinals	RRQ Hoshi vs. Team Vamos	3,388,658
December 11, 2024	Lower Bracket Quarterfinals	RRQ Hoshi vs. Selangor Red Giants	2,859,673
December 14, 2024	Lower Bracket Finals	Team Liquid ID vs. Selangor Red Giants	2,700,393
December 8, 2024	Upper Bracket Semifinals	Fnatic ONIC Philippines vs. Falcon Esports	2,665,324
December 4, 2024	Swiss Stage Day 6	Aurora Gaming vs. Team Liquid ID	2,567,988

Live viewership for Indonesian, Filipino, and Malaysian teams have consistently been the highest for the past iterations of the World Championships with the Burmese and Cambodian viewership having to trail significantly behind the three largest regions in MLBB.

=== Sponsors ===
The M6 World Championships oversees regional partners from different countries to get the chance to stream the tournament in the participating countries and also worldwide.

Company name	Classification	Country/region of partnership
Qiddiya City	Presenting Partner	Global
ASUS Republic of Gamers	Official Gaming Phone	Global
Fairrie	Official Timekeeper and Jewelry Partner	Global
Secretlab	Official Chair Partner	Global
Meiji Hello Panda	Official Snack Partner	Global
Astro Arena & Astro	Official Broadcast Partner & Official Media Partner	Malaysia
Hotlink	Official 5G Internet Provider	Malaysia
TNTCO	Official Merchandise Partner	Malaysia
JD Sports	Official Lifestyle Fashion Partner	Malaysia
100plus	Official Beverage Partner	Malaysia
ESI	Strategic Partner	Malaysia
GoPay	Official E-Wallet Partner	Indonesia
Erigo	Official Merchandise Partner	Indonesia
ABA Bank	Official Bank Partner	Cambodia

=== M6 Pass ===
Moonton announced that the Marksman Hero, Claude, will be receiving this edition's special M6 Pass Skin.

The M-Pass is an annual tournament pass for Mobile Legends: Bang Bang's M World Championship that gives players numerous rewards and incentives while doing Daily Tasks and Challenges. This edition of the pass includes custom M6 effects such as recall animations, kill animations, a trail animation, limited edition skins, and various in-game rewards that can be used to unlock more rewards.

Upon purchasing any M6 Pass, Claude's "Challenger's Spark" Skin would be attained by every person who purchase it while its Prime skin "Cosmic Blaze" is able to be attained once the player's M6 pass reaches Level 75. The M6 Pass was officially made to be available on November 18.

=== Theme Song ===
On 8 November 2024, the tournament's official song and music video "Game Never Over" written by Bjørgen van Essen was released in the game's official YouTube channel. The Malay version titled "Perjuangan Takkan Tamat" performed by Faizal Tahir was released on November 18, 2024, through Faizal's, the game's main and Malaysia YouTube channel.

==== Regional Theme Songs ====
On 24 November, Archie dela Cruz, popularly known as Flow G, collaborated with MPL Philippines and released the song titled "Pinakamalakas".

=== Astro Showcase x M6 Carnival ===
For the very first time, this M6 series will bringing a carnival that will rock at the Axiata Arena with unforgettable entertainment. Top-tier local artist will light up the stage such as, Hael Husaini, Naim Daniel, Firdaus Rahmat and many more, ready to deliver outstanding performances on 13 December until 15 December 2024 in collaboration with Astro. Existing Astro customers in Malaysia could also redeem an exclusive passes their M6 Lower Bracket Finals or Grand Finals tickets on MyAstro App.

=== Championship skins ===
Following Fnatic ONIC PH triumph victory, the team has been asking in the post-match media interview of which hero will they choose. According to Grant Duane "Kelra" Pillas, the Finals MVP, he prefers to have either Luo Yi or Joy while for himself, he wants Beatrix, his own signature hero due to his stellar performance in the upper bracket and Grand Final matches with the hero that memorized him as "The Gold Standard". In addition, he also stated that Beatrix have a versatility of weapon to be used and high damage output that makes her become core in the tournaments for Gold Laners.

A month after the grand final match, MLBB eSports confirmed the assassin hero Joy as the champion skin to celebrate their jungler King Cyric "K1NGKONG" Perez's performance for the team while marksman Beatrix as Finals MVP (FMVP) skin, become the first hero to have M-Series skin (M4 Prime) and champion skin (FMVP). According to FNOC's Vice President (now known as ONIC Philippines), Paul Denver "Yeb" Lintag Miranda, the team chose Joy because of "almost represents ONIC Philippines with her skills and vibrant color (yellow)". In addition on his quote,

"Her story mirrors our journey—a relentless pursuit of excellence, overcoming challenges, and staying determined. After years of growth, we finally achieved the pinnacle of success together."

— Paul Denver "Yeb" Lintag Miranda

Moonton also comfimed that Kelra himself will co-design Beatrix FMVP skin. According to him, he wants to signify his legacy in the scene with the precise to adapt and shooting to enemies as a Gold Laner.

== Awards ==
On December 14, the M6 World Championships announced an awarding ceremony for multiple awards for teams and individuals. They were distributed by executive members of Moonton, the game developers of Mobile Legends.

Bold Face – Denotes the player/team won the award

Award	Nominees
M6 Fan Choice Award – Team of the Year	RRQ Hoshi
M6 Breakthrough Player Award	John Vincent "Innocent" Banal (Selangor Red Giants): King Cyric "K1NGKONG" Perez (Fnatic ONIC Philippines); Sultan "AeronnShikii" Muhammad (Team Liquid ID); Anton "Hiko" Pak (Team Spirit)

== Final standing ==
Place	Team (Name and region)	Wild Card		Swiss	Playoffs								Record	Win rate	Prize pool
Place	Team (Name and region)	Groups	Decider	Swiss	UQF	USF	UF	LFR	LQF	LSF	LF	GF	Record	Win rate	Prize pool
Champions	Fnatic ONIC Philippines	Qualified for Swiss		3–0	2–0	3–2	3–1	—N/a				4–1	15–4	.789	$320,000
First Runner Up	Team Liquid Indonesia	Qualified for Swiss		3–2	2–0	3–2	1–3	—N/a			3–0	1–4	13–11	.542	$150,000
Second Runner Up	Selangor Red Giants	Qualified for Swiss		3–2	0–2	—N/a		3–1	3–1	3–0	0–3		12–7	.632	$90,000
Third Runner Up	Team Spirit	Qualified for Swiss		3–1	0–2	—N/a		3–1	3–1	0–3			9–7	.563	$60,000
5th–6th	Falcon Esports	Qualified for Swiss		3–1	2–0	2–3	—N/a		1–3				8–7	.533	$50,000
5th–6th	RRQ Hoshi	Qualified for Swiss		3–0	2–1	2–3	—N/a		1–3				8–7	.533	$50,000
7th–8th	NIP Flash	Qualified for Swiss		3–1	0–2	—N/a		0–3					3–5	.375	$40,000
7th–8th	Team Vamos	Qualified for Swiss		3–2	1–2	—N/a		1–3					5–7	.417	$40,000
9th–11th	BloodThirstyKings	Qualified for Swiss		2–3									2–3	.400	$20,000
9th–11th	CFU Gaming	Qualified for Swiss		2–3									2–3	.400	$20,000
9th–11th	Twisted Minds	Qualified for Swiss		2–3									2–3	.400	$20,000
12th–14th	Aurora Gaming	Qualified for Swiss		1–3									1–3	.400	$16,000
12th–14th	KeepBest Gaming	Qualified for Swiss		1–3									1–3	.250	$16,000
12th–14th	S2G Esports	Qualified for Swiss		1–3									1–3	.250	$16,000
15th–16th	Maycam Evolve	Qualified for Swiss		0–3									0–3	.000	$12,000
15th–16th	Ulfhednar	3–0	3–0	0–3									6–3	.667	$12,000
17th	Insilio	2–1	0–3										2–4	.333	$9,000
18th-23rd	DFYG	2–1											2–1	.667	$9,000
18th-23rd	RRQ Akira	2–1											2–1	.667	$9,000
18th-23rd	Geekay Esports	2–1											2–1	.667	$9,000
18th-23rd	Legion Esports	2–1											2–1	.667	$9,000
18th-23rd	Niightmare Esports	2–1											2–1	.667	$9,000
18th-23rd	The MongolZ	2–1											2–1	.667	$9,000
Place	Team (Name & Region)	Wild Card		Swiss	Playoffs								Record	Win Rate	Prize pool
Place	Team (Name & Region)	Groups	Decider	Swiss	UQF	USF	UF	LFR	LQF	LSF	LF	GF	Record	Win Rate	Prize pool

== Controversies ==
=== Disconnection issue ===
During the crucial match between Turkey's Ulfhednar and China's DianFengYaoGuai (DFYG), a crucial pick off was made on Liu "Zzzed" Chenjian when his hero died inside of the turret that led to the eventual collapse and subsequent defeat of the Chinese squad. The team however, filed a protest against the game, stating that Liu's device disconnected from the Wi-Fi signal inside of the venue that led to the eventual defeat of DFYG. The investigation however ruled that DFYG's claim was not insufficient for a rematch thus continuing the decider match between Ulfhednar and Insilio.

Public outrage was shown on social media especially the Chinese fanbase of DFYG.

== Notes ==
Awards and achievements
Preceded by AP Bren	MLBB World Champion; Fnatic ONIC Philippines; The MLBB M6 World Champions	Succeeded by Defending champions
Preceded by David "FlapTzy" Canon	MLBB Finals MVP; Grant "Kelra" Pillas; The MLBB M6 Finals MVP	Succeeded by Current Finals MVP
