= Demonkite =

Filipino esports player (born 2004)

Personal information
- Name: Jonard Cedrix Caranto
- Nickname: Smiling Demon
- Born: January 10, 2003 (age 23)
- Nationality: Filipino

Current team
- Team: RRQ Hoshi
- Role: Juggler
- League: MPL Indonesia

Career information
- Games: Mobile Legends: Bang Bang
- Playing career: 2021–present

Team history
- 2021–2022: RSG Philippines
- 2023: RSG Malaysia
- 2024: RSG Philippines
- 2024-2026 (Note: Still in contract with Aurora): Aurora Gaming
- 2026: RRQ Hoshi

Career highlights and awards
- MLBB World Championship (M7); 1x MPL Philippines champion (S9); MPL Malaysia Regular Season MVP (S12); Best Rookie of the Season (S8)

Jonard Cedrix Caranto, professionally known as Demonkite is a Filipino Mobile Legends: Bang Bang player for RRQ Hoshi in MPL Indonesia.

== Early life ==
Jonard Cedrix Caranto was born on January 10, 2003. He was already into video games at a young age going against the wishes of his parents to focus on his studies. At age 12, Caranto described getting "addicted" to mobile games and was already convinced of pursuing a career in esports. His grandfather however encouraged him to follow his aspiration who would die before Caranto reach age 15.

While it was planned that Caranto would pursue a college degree in information technology, he eventually gained the support of his parents. He was also originally a League of Legends player.

== Career ==
=== RSG Philippines ===
Jonard Cedrix Caranto is known as Demonkite in the professional esports scene. He is also known by the moniker "Smiling Demon". He fills the role of juggler in Mobile Legends: Bang Bang. He was recruited by RSG Philippines for MPL Philippines Season 8 in 2021. RSG coach Brian "Panda" Lim scouted Demonkite while the latter was playing for an amateur team. He was named best rookie for that season.

With Nathanael "Nathzz" Crisologo, Demonkite defeated RRQ Hoshi in the grand finals of the 2022 Mid Season Cup (MSC).

RSG Philippines finished third in the MPL Philippines Season 10, leading to Demonkite to take a hiatus.

=== RSG Malaysia ===
Demonkite joins RSG Malaysia in 2023. He was named regular season MVP for Season 12 of MPL Malaysia. They failed to win the championship.

=== Return to RSG Philippines ===
In 2024, MPL Philippines Season 13 saw the return of Demonkite to RSG Philippines. Coach Panda remarked how the team performed better with Demonkite than with John "Irrad" Abarquez two weeks into the season noting Demonkite's improved maturity and teamwork after his stint in Malaysia.

=== Aurora Gaming ===
Still in 2024, Demonkite moved to Aurora Gaming in Season 14 during the transfer window seeking growth with another team. This coincides with Irrad's desire to return to the Philippines, with Demonkite released after Aurora made an offer.

Aurora Gaming won the M7 World Championship with Demonkite in its roster in January 2026.

=== RRQ Hoshi ===
Following Aurora Gaming's disappointing performance during Season 17, Caranto was benched by the organization and did not play in the Cyberhero x Donatov.net AFK Masters Cup stint of the team, instead playing MDL jungler Gabriel "DENJIRO" Guinto as the replacement to Caranto. On July 28, 2026, Caranto was named as the Jungler for MPL Indonesia's RRQ Hoshi, replacing former Jungler Kenneth "Super Kenn" Marcello who was moved to their Malaysian team RRQ Tora.

== Personal life ==
Caranto has been engaged with Angel Seiyuu since 2024. He has a daughter with his fiance. The family lives in Quezon City as of April 2026.
