= MLBB M7 World Championship =

7th competition of Mobile Legends: Bang Bang World Championship

- 2026
- Logo

Tournament information
- Dates: 3–25 January 2026
- Administrator: Moonton
- Tournament format(s): Single Round Robin (Wild Card Stage) Swiss-system tournament (Swiss Stage) Double-elimination tournament (Knockout Stage)
- Host: Indonesia
- Venue(s): XO Hall (Wild Card Stage–Upper Bracket Quarterfinals); Tennis Indoor Senayan (Knockout Stage & Grand Finals)
- Teams: 22
- Purse: $1,000,000

Final positions
- Champion: Aurora Gaming PH (1st Title)
- 1st runners-up: Alter Ego Esports
- 2nd runners-up: Selangor Red Giants

Tournament statistics
- MVP: Dylan "Light" Catipon (Aurora Gaming PH)

The 2025 Mobile Legends: Bang Bang World Championship, commonly referred to as M7 or the M7 World Championship, was the seventh iteration of the M Series World Championship for the mobile multiplayer online battle arena (MOBA) game Mobile Legends: Bang Bang (MLBB) organized by its developers Moonton. M7 was held from 3 to 25 January 2026 in Jakarta, Indonesia, the second time both the city and country hosted the tournament after the M4 in 2023.

M7 was the second tournament to be held later than the usual window due to the 2025 SEA Games in Thailand, where MLBB is contested as a discipline in esports. 22 teams qualified based on their placements within their regional leagues with major and minor regions being relegated in different phases of the tournament. Defending champions ONIC Philippines notably failed to qualify for the tournament after being eliminated in the lower bracket of MPL Philippines Season 16. Their absence marked the second consecutive time the defending champions failed to return to defend their title in the tournament history.

The tournament final featured the third consecutive appearances of a Philippine and Indonesian team. Aurora Gaming Philippines defeated Alter Ego Esports 4-0 to claim the Philippines' sixth consecutive world title. Roamer Dylan "Light" Catipon is awarded the Finals MVP.

The Grand Finals reached over 5.68 million peak concurrent viewers to become most-watched mobile esports tournament in history, breaking the all-time viewership record for a mobile esports tournament previously set by the 2021 Free Fire World Series in Singapore.

== Qualification ==
The national leagues of the Philippines, Indonesia, and Malaysia each received two direct slots for the tournament. Representatives from the regional leagues of Turkey, Vietnam, China, the Middle East and North Africa (MENA), and Eastern Europe and Central Asia (EECC) each received two slots as well, one directly and one through the Wild Card stage. The regional leagues of Latin America (LATAM) and Cambodia received a single direct slot. For the first time since M2, Japan returns to the tournament with a single Wild Card slot along with Mongolia and the Mekong region. Notably, no slot was allocated for the North American region.

== Venues ==
The tournament was held in two venues in Jakarta, Indonesia. The initial Wild Card and the main group stage along with the first round of the knockout stage was held at the XO Hall (MPL Arena). The remaining knockout matches was held at the Gelora Bung Karno Tennis Indoor Stadium (Tennis Indoor Senayan). According to Moonton, the Indonesia Arena was initially considered for the later stages, but it was booked for another event. Tennis Indoor Senayan was the same venue used for the later phases of the M4.

Indonesia				MLBB M7 World Championship is located in Jakarta
Jakarta				MLBB M7 World Championship is located in Jakarta
Wild Card	Swiss Stage	Knockout Stage	Grand Finals	MLBB M7 World Championship is located in Jakarta
XO Hall (MPL Arena)			Tennis Indoor Senayan	MLBB M7 World Championship is located in Jakarta
Capacity: 1,000			Capacity: 3,300	MLBB M7 World Championship is located in Jakarta

== Format ==
●	Wild Card stage	●	Opening ceremony	●	Group stage	●	Knockout stage	GF	Grand Finals

3rd Jan	4th Jan	5th Jan	6th Jan	7th Jan	8th Jan	9th Jan	10th Jan	11th Jan	12th Jan	13th Jan	14th Jan	15th Jan	16th Jan	17th Jan	18th Jan	19th Jan	20th Jan	21st Jan	22nd Jan	23rd Jan	24th Jan	25th Jan
●	●	●	●			●	●	●	●	●		●	●	●	●			●	●	●	●	GF

The tournament has three stages: a single round-robin Wild Card phase, a Swiss system group stage, and a double-elimination knockout stage. For the first time since the introduction of the Wild Card phase in M5, two teams advances to the main group stage alongside the fourteen directly qualified teams.

The Wild Card stage featured eight teams divided into two groups of four, with each group playing in a best-of-three single round-robin format. The top two teams of each group advances to a seeded single best-of-five play-off with the top two teams of the other group, where the winners of each play-off advances to the main group stage.

Returning after being introduced at the M6, the group stage featured a Swiss system format. The first and second round is a single match, while the succeeding rounds is a best-of-three series. After the third round, two teams who won all three matches automatically qualifies for the knockout stages. By the fourth round, three teams will advance. The fifth and final round will determine the remaining three teams to qualify. The eight remaining teams will then be drawn randomly into the double-elimination knockout stages. The quarterfinals is a best-of-three series, while the remaining rounds features a best-of-five series, except for the Grand Finals, which is a best-of-seven series.

== Participating teams ==
=== Power Ranking Leaderboard ===
Mobile Legends Esports

Moonton recently unveiled a power ranking leaderboard on its official social media accounts highlighting the top teams across the participating countries and regions ahead of M7. In Indonesia, ONIC Esports currently leads, building on their M5 runner-up finish and MSC 2023 championship, followed closely by Bigetron by Vitality. The Philippines is spearheaded by Aurora Gaming, with Team Liquid PH, the MSC 2025 champions, ranked second. In Malaysia,Selangor Red Giants or SRG.OG sits at the top, followed by CG Esports. Team Spirit leads the EECA region, while Team Falcons is the frontrunner in MENA. YBINGAME currently dominates China, and Galaxy Legends leads Cambodia. LATAM sees Influence Rage is tied with Alpha 7 Esports as their strongest contenders, while Myanmar's top teams include Team 7 and Yangon Galacticos. In Turkey, Aurora Türkiye, the sister team of Aurora Gaming, is recognized as the region's strongest squad.

Boldface – The team has qualified for M7.

Rank	Region										
Rank	Indonesia	Philippines	Malaysia	Eastern Europe and Central Asia	Middle East and North Africa	China	Cambodia	Latin America	Myanmar	Turkey	Singapore
October 6
1st	ONIC Esports	Aurora Gaming	CG Esports	Team Spirit	Team Falcons	YBINGAME	See You Soon	Influence Rage	Team 7	Aurora Türkiye	EVIL
2nd	Bigetron by Vitality	Team Liquid PH	Selangor Red Giants; OG Esports	None							
October 13
1st	ONIC Esports	Aurora Gaming	Selangor Red Giants; OG Esports	Team Spirit	Team Falcons	YBINGAME	**CFU Gaming (New)**	Influence Rage	**Falcon Esports (New)**	Aurora Türkiye	EVIL
2nd	Bigetron by Vitality	**ONIC Philippines (New)**	CG Esports	None							
October 21
1st	ONIC Esports	Aurora Gaming	Selangor Red Giants; OG Esports	Team Spirit	Team Falcons	YBINGAME	CFU Gaming	Influence Rage	Falcon Esports	Aurora Türkiye	EVIL
2nd	Bigetron by Vitality	ONIC Philippines	CG Esports	None							
October 28
1st	ONIC Esports	**Team Liquid PH**	Selangor Red Giants; OG Esports	Team Spirit	**Team Falcons**	YBINGAME	**Galaxy Legends**	Influence Rage/**Black Sentence**	Falcon Esports	**Aurora Türkiye**	EVIL
2nd	Bigetron by Vitality	**Aurora Gaming**	CG Esports	None							
November 4
1st	**ONIC Esports**	**Team Liquid PH**	Selangor Red Giants; OG Esports	Team Spirit	**Team Falcons**	YBINGAME	Galaxy Legends	Influence Rage/Black Sentence	Falcon Esports	**Aurora Türkiye**	**EVIL**
2nd	**Alter Ego**	**Aurora Gaming**	CG Esports	None							

Several teams that were part of the MLBB M6 World Championships have notably been eliminated or are not fueling rosters in MLBB at this time. Grand finalists Team Liquid Indonesia have been eliminated from MPL Indonesia Season 16's playoffs, denying them a repeat appearance in the world championships. Other teams that have been eliminated from playoff contention are MTC Season 4 champions S2G Esports, Ulfhednar (who has now had its team absorbed by Aurora Gaming), and BloodThirstyKings (BTK) who has transferred to MLBB's rival Honor of Kings.

=== Qualified teams ===
– Had at least one M World Championship title
– Reached the Knockout Stage
– Finished in the Swiss Stage (for previous Swiss Stage participants)/Reached the Swiss Stage (for previous Wildcard participants)
– Debuted in the M World Championship Series as a team in either stage

Swiss Stage

Fourteen teams outright qualify for the Swiss Stage while two teams await qualification from the wildcard, the first time that two teams will qualify from the wildcard stage since its inception in M5.

Region	League	Placement	Team name	Short name
Indonesia	MPL Indonesia	Season 16 Champions	ONIC Esports	ONIC
Indonesia	MPL Indonesia	Season 16 First Runner Up	Alter Ego Esports	AE
Philippines	MPL Philippines	Season 16 Champions	Team Liquid	TLPH
Philippines	MPL Philippines	Season 16 First Runner Up	Aurora Gaming PH	RORA
Malaysia	MPL Malaysia	Season 16 Champions	Selangor Red Giants	SRG
Malaysia	MPL Malaysia	Season 16 First Runner Up	CG Esports	CG
Singapore	MPL Singapore	Season 10 Champions	EVIL	EVIL
Cambodia	MPL Cambodia	Season 9 Champions	CFU Gaming	CFU
Middle East and North Africa	MPL MENA	Season 8 Champions	Team Falcons	FLCN
Myanmar	MLBB Super League Myanmar	Season 2 Champions	Yangon Galacticos	YG
Eastern Europe and Central Asia	MLBB Continental; Championships	Season 6 Champions	Team Spirit	TS
Turkey	MTC Türkiye Championship	Season 6 Champions	Aurora Gaming	AUR
Latin America	MPL LATAM	Season 4 Champions	Black Sentence	BSE
China	MLBB China Master	Season 1 Champions	DianFengYaoGuai	DFYG

Wild Card Stage

Unlike the previous edition, the wildcard stage will produce two qualifying teams this time instead of one. Three regions: China, EECA, MENA, and Turkey are non SEA-regions who have two seeds, one in the group stage and one in the wildcard.

Region	League	Placement	Team name	Short name
Vietnam	Vietnam MLBB Championship; Winter 2025	VMC Winter Champions	RLG SE	RLG
Middle East and North Africa	MPL MENA	Season 8 Runner-Up	Axe Esports	AXE
Turkey	MTC Türkiye Championship	Season 6 Runner-Up	Boostgate Esports	BE
Eastern Europe and Central Asia	MLBB Continental; Championships	Season 6 Runner-Up	Virtus.pro	VP
Mekong	M Challenge Cup Mekong	Season 6 Champions	Leon Esports	LEON
China	MLBB China Master	Season 1 Runner-Up	Guangzhou Gaming	GZG
Mongolia	ESN National Championship 2025	2025 Champions	Team Zone	TZ
Japan	MLBB M7 Japan Qualifier	Qualifier Champions	ZETA Division	ZETA

== Participating Rosters ==
=== Swiss Stage Teams ===
Team	Coaching staff			Main Five					Substitute
Team	Head coach	Assistant coach	Analyst	Exp	Jungle	Mid	Gold	Roam	Substitute
ONIC Esports	Adi (Adi Syofian Asyauri)	CW (Calvin Winata)	Paddington (Riyan Febriyanto)	Lutpii (Moch Lutfi Adrianto)	Kairi (Kairi Rayosdelsol)	S A N Z (Gilang)	Skylar (Schevenko David Tendean)	Kiboy (Nicky Fernando Pontonuwu)	Savero (Clayton Adrielo Kuswanto)
Alter Ego Esports	Xepher (Kenny Deo)	Styx (Michael Abraham)		Nino (Syauki Fauzan Sumarno)	Yazukee (Muhammad Affan Wahyudi)	Hijumee (Dalvin Ramadhana Putra)	Arfy (Arifudin Dingarai)	Alekk (Alexander Owen)	Rinee (Syahrul Ramadhan)
Alter Ego Esports	Xepher (Kenny Deo)	Styx (Michael Abraham)		Nino (Syauki Fauzan Sumarno)	Yazukee (Muhammad Affan Wahyudi)	Hijumee (Dalvin Ramadhana Putra)	Arfy (Arifudin Dingarai)	Alekk (Alexander Owen)	Cyruz (Muhammad Halim)
Team Liquid PH	Ar Sy (Rodel Cruz)	Tictac (Harold Reyes)		Sanford (Sanford Marin Vinuya)	KarlTzy (Karl Gabriel Nepomuceno)	Sanji (Alston Pabico)	Oheb (Kiel Calvin Soriano)	Jaypee (Jaypee Dela Cruz)	Perkz (John Sumawan)
Aurora Gaming PH	Master the Basics (Aniel Jiandani)	Dex Star (Dexter Louise Alaba)	Calad (Justin Limbo)	Edward (Edward Jay Dapadap)	Demonkite (Jonard Cedrix Caranto)	Yue (Kenneth Carl Tadeo)	Domeng (Jan Dominic Delmundo)	Light (Dylan Aaron Catipon)	–
Selangor Red Giants	Arcadia (Michael Angelo Bocado)	OzoraVeki (Poon Kok Sing)	–	Kramm (Mark Genzon Rusiana)	Sekys (Muhammad Haqqullah Ahmad)	Stormie (Hazziq Danish Rizwan)	Innocent (John Vincent Banal)	Yums (Muhammad Qayyum Suhairi)	Winter (Chun Chin Wee)
CG Esports	Rainn (Fikri Aiman Bin Mohd Khidzir)	Cody Banks (Lenard Joseph Merano)	Mariah (Mariah Binti Ahmad)	Ye3 (Muhammad Al-Amin Bin Zamri)	Garyy (Muhammad Syafizan Najmi)	CikuGais (Muhammad Danial Fuad)	Amzziq (Amar Haziq Bin Abdul Muaz)	Valenz (Luk Jun Yip)	Aj (Muhammad Azri bin Jamaludin)
Evil	carrot (Goh Qi En)	–		Gear (Tristan Christopher Nathanael)	Aether (Jason Keane Zefanya)	Seilah (Basil Lim Dao Ze)	Venn (Reaven Ugdiman)	PoWerFuL (Willie Lee Kwong Sheng)	Tzu (Alvin Teo)
Evil	carrot (Goh Qi En)	–		Gear (Tristan Christopher Nathanael)	Aether (Jason Keane Zefanya)	Seilah (Basil Lim Dao Ze)	Venn (Reaven Ugdiman)	PoWerFuL (Willie Lee Kwong Sheng)	Naako
CFU Gaming	T1m3go (Gesang Jiacuo)	HanXie (Huy Ravin)	–	Wadu (Vann Dane)	Detective (Nhem Chandavan)	Oppi (Chhuon Phengkong)	Xingg (Khoun Amey)	BOXI (Sok Viera)	Pex
CFU Gaming	T1m3go (Gesang Jiacuo)	HanXie (Huy Ravin)	–	Wadu (Vann Dane)	Detective (Nhem Chandavan)	Oppi (Chhuon Phengkong)	Xingg (Khoun Amey)	BOXI (Sok Viera)	Zee (Cheang Piseth)
Team Falcons	Paoweeburn (Paolo Lobaton)	Kakashi (Amr Wafed Yassein Hafez Elyased)	–	Sanji (Ayman Othman Bin Muidh Alqarni)	Boyet (Bien Chumecera)	Cuffin (Muath Saad S Alkoraini)	Saano (Sulaiman Musallam S Alrashdi)	Trolll (Moayed Ayman M Kharaba)	Tarzan (Mohammed Ayman M Kharabah)
Team Falcons	Paoweeburn (Paolo Lobaton)	Kakashi (Amr Wafed Yassein Hafez Elyased)	–	Sanji (Ayman Othman Bin Muidh Alqarni)	Boyet (Bien Chumecera)	Cuffin (Muath Saad S Alkoraini)	Saano (Sulaiman Musallam S Alrashdi)	Trolll (Moayed Ayman M Kharaba)	Koba (Mohamed Mahmoud Mohamed Telep AbdRabuo)
Yangon Galacticos	Marvz (Mark Neil Luz)	M God (Min Htun Aung)	–	Ying (Hein Htet Oo)	Hannn (Han Htoo Swe)	Lina (Kaung Min Khant)	Stitch (Htet Linn Hlyan Aung)	Blink (Kyaw Thuya)	Kaize
Team Spirit	Coldstar (Nikita Morozov)	–	Ooops (Nazar Kislov)	Kid Bomba (Mathaios Panagiotis Chatzilakos)	ONESHOT (Alexander Sharkov)	Sunset Lover (Kemiran Kochkarov)	Hiko (Anton Igorevich Pak)	SAWO (Stanislav Reshniak)	HarmonySoul (Anastasia Tsai)
Team Spirit	Coldstar (Nikita Morozov)	–	Ooops (Nazar Kislov)	Kid Bomba (Mathaios Panagiotis Chatzilakos)	ONESHOT (Alexander Sharkov)	Sunset Lover (Kemiran Kochkarov)	Hiko (Anton Igorevich Pak)	SAWO (Stanislav Reshniak)	Euphoria (Ekaterina Ustinova)
Aurora Gaming	Badgalseph (Sacit Arslan)	APEX47 (Furkan Akbulut)	–	Lunar (Mehmet Ibrahim Ilgun)	Tienzy (Sidar Mentese)	Rosa (Ahmet Taha Batir)	Sigibum (Siyar Akbulut)	Pagu (Lukasz Bigus)	ReiNNNN
Black Sentence Esports	Tsubasaa (Walace Seabra)	Laintime	–	Orochi (Rodrigo Gabriel Z. Dueñas)	Hide on bush (Facundo Ledesma)	Shin (Johan Andruy S. González)	Doom (Cesar Daniel Aldave Hernandez)	Stephe (José Carlos Loayza Machaca)	Toshii
DianFengYaoGuai	Sasa (Lu Khai Bean)	Loong (Saw Kee Loong)	–	Veldora (Kenley Nathaniel Zefanya)	Super Kenn (Kenneth Marcello)	Yione (Lin Haifeng)	Loong (Tang Zelong)	zzzed (Liu Chenjian)	Cedar (Zhao Mingyuan)

=== Wild Card Teams ===
Team	Coaching staff			Main Five					Substitute
Team	Head coach	Assistant coach	Analyst	Exp	Jungle	Mid	Gold	Roam	Substitute
RLG SE	Behave (Gian Carl Lamintao)	Anchovys		HHN	Ashritt	Hehehehehehe (Lâm Văn Đạt)	Daylight (Nguyễn Việt Anh)	Pancake (Archie Guevarra Jr.)	Radahn K
Axe Esports	Jed (Mohammad Rashed Mohammed Marshool Taheri)	Bu Ezz (Saeed Rashed Mohammed Marshool Taheri)		Alpho (Ahmed Osama Ibrahim Aly)	Throwboy (Osama Abdel-basset Saleh)	Quanok (Omar Sami Ali)	Pharaoh (Mahmoud Alhassan Mahmoud)	RiseCrim (Mahmoud Ahmed Sayed Ahmed Rawash)	Jersy (Mohammed Hisham Mohamed Elhusseini)
Boostgate Esports	Tezet (Yosua Sanger)	Coach Nova (Ahmet Yılmaz)		EKSI (Egemen Önem)	Kazue (Mehmed Akif Ozturk)	Identity (Halil İbrahim Kırık)	Rx (Necdet Efe Arslan)	Wackter (Emre Emin Yılmaz)	Ruler (Samet Saduc)
Virtus.pro	FlySolo (Kenneth Coloma)	MoNika		BadKot (Denis Bogomolov)	zaur egoist (Zaur Magomadov)	Bober (Dmitry Belyaev)	Super Egorka (Egor Bugaev)	Pluto (Vladimir Misyurin)	Kerrigan
Leon Esports	Yakou (John Erwin Magno)	Trequartista (Donlawat Sueklai)		Juviana (Phoutthavan Pheungpasomxay)	Water (Sitthidet Inthanouvong)	Agi (Aphisith Inmixay)	Lamaj (Jamaloding Dimati)	Jinzu (Leogene Dionela)	SuperEra (Thatthasone Vongphouthong)
Guangzhou Gaming	Sumanas	Vren (Vrendon Consul Pesebre)		Modi (Li Gaorong)	Canoneo (Prince Jeck Canoneo)	xYing (Xu Weile)	Owl (Lee Howard Gonzales)	Meii (Zhou Ri)	Quan
Team Zone	Summer (Unurbat Munkhbat)	–		Bankai (Erkhembayar Bathkuu)	Zxaura (Bagabandi Tegshjargal)	Kenni (Zolboo Tsogtbaatar)	Kei (Erdenbileg Erdensuren)	Bright (Saikhanbileg Oyunbumchin)	Aizn (Enkhbat Munkhharaa)
Team Zone	Summer (Unurbat Munkhbat)	–		Bankai (Erkhembayar Bathkuu)	Zxaura (Bagabandi Tegshjargal)	Kenni (Zolboo Tsogtbaatar)	Kei (Erdenbileg Erdensuren)	Bright (Saikhanbileg Oyunbumchin)	Mura (Temuulen Bavuugarid)
ZETA DIVISION	Ola (Kevin Valdez Olavere)	–		june1 (Jun Oda)	ten (Tenta Takazawa)	Katsu (Mark Hiro Iwasaki)	muiminet (Asahi Nakaminami)	Kani (Keigo Matsubuchi)	Falcon (Tsuneo Ken Dejos)

== Draw ==
=== Swiss Stage ===
The Wild Card Draw ceremony for the MLBB M7 World Championships was held on 12 December 2025. The event was hosted by Indonesian MLBB caster Rachael Melati "Aeterna" Nalapraya, who began the proceedings by announcing the in-game introduction of the new MLBB M7 Pass.

The official group draw was conducted by two representatives of the tournament's sponsors: Mr. Alfian from Realme and Mrs. Nathalia Nugrahani, Head of Marketing for Visa Inc. Notably, Visa's participation marked the payment giant's inaugural entry into the MLBB esports ecosystem.

Draw Procedure

The Wild Card Draw determined the final group assignments for the eight participating regional teams. These teams were initially divided into two separate seeding pools.

The drawing mechanism ensured balanced grouping: the first team selected by the representatives was allocated to Group A, while the second team drawn was allocated to Group B. This alternating cycle continued until all eight teams were assigned to their respective groups for the upcoming stage.

Seed 1	Seed 2
Virtus.pro	Axe Esports
BoostGate Esports	RLG Esports
Guangzhou Gaming	Leon Esports
Team Zone	ZETA Division

Group A	Group B
BoostGate Esports	Guangzhou Gaming
Team Zone	Virtus.pro
Leon Esports	Axe Esports
ZETA Division	RLG Esports

== Wildcard Stage ==
The wildcard stage remains the same as its previous iterations since M5 however, this will be the first wildcard stage where two teams would advance to the swiss stage instead of one.

=== Group A ===
Pos	Team	Pld	W	L	GF	GA	GD	Pts	Qualification
1	Team Zone	3	3	0	6	1	+5	3	Knockouts
2	BoostGate Esports	3	2	1	5	2	+3	2	Knockouts
3	Leon Esports	3	1	2	2	5	−3	1	
4	ZETA Division	3	0	3	1	6	−5	0	

=== Group B ===
Pos	Team	Pld	W	L	GF	GA	GD	Pts	Qualification
1	Virtus.pro	3	3	0	6	0	+6	3	Knockouts
2	Guangzhou Gaming	3	2	1	4	2	+2	2	Knockouts
3	Axe Esports	3	1	2	2	4	−2	1	
4	RLG SE	3	0	3	0	6	−6	0	

=== Crossover Match ===
The crossover match is a best-of-five matchup between the top two seeds of each group. Whoever wins the Best of 5 advances to the main swiss stage with the first team qualifying for Swiss matching up against Myanmar's Yangon Galacticos and the second being with Indonesia's ONIC Esports.

Down 2–0, Team Zone of Mongolia reverse swept the Chinese runner-ups from the crossover match to qualify to the main swiss stage. Meanwhile, Turkey's Boostgate Esports denied Mid-Season Cup wildcard winners Virtus.pro in a back-and-forth best-of-5.

Crossover Match (Best-of-5)
A1	Team Zone	3
B2	Guangzhou Gaming	2
B1	Virtus.pro	2
A2	Boostgate Esports	3

Qualified
Team Zone
Boostgate Esports

== Swiss Stage ==
=== Round 1 ===
1-0 / 0-1; Round 1	10 January	ONIC Esports	1	–	0	Boostgate Esports	XO Hall
	15:00 (UTC+8)	ONIC Esports, 1–0; Boostgate Esports, 0–1					MPL Arena
		94.2k 8; 3; 0; 15; 16	Game Time: 29:04; ONIC Esports wins the series Map: Flying Clouds; Gold; Turrets; Lord Take(s); Tortoise; Orange Buff; Purple Buff; MVP of the Match: Kiboy (ONIC)			82.1k 8; 3; 3; 13; 15	

1-0 / 0-1; Round 1	10 January	CFU Gaming	0	–	1	Black Sentence Esports	XO Hall
	16:00 (UTC+8)	Black Sentence Esports, 1–0; CFU Gaming, 0–1					MPL Arena
		53.2k 4; 0; 2; 8; 9	Game Time: 18:08; Black Sentence Esports wins the series Map: Expanding Rivers; Gold; Turrets; Lord Take(s); Tortoise; Orange Buff; Purple Buff; MVP of the Match: Shin (BSE)			60.3k 7; 3; 1; 10; 8	

1-0 / 0-1; Round 1	10 January	Team Zone	0	–	1	Yangon Galacticos	XO Hall
	17:00 (UTC+8)	Yangon Galacticos, 1–0; Team Zone, 0–1					MPL Arena
		61.0k 2; 0; 1; 7; 7	Game Time: 20:03; Yangon Galacticos wins the series Map: Broken Walls; Gold; Turrets; Lord Take(s); Tortoise; Orange Buff; Purple Buff; MVP of the Match: Blink (YG)			65.0k 9; 4; 2; 8; 12	

1-0 / 0-1; Round 1	10 January	DianFengYaoGuai	0	–	1	Team Falcons	XO Hall
	18:00 (UTC+8)	Team Falcons, 1–0; DianFengYaoGuai, 0–1					MPL Arena
		78.9k 6; 3; 1; 12; 12	Game Time: 27:27; Team Falcons wins the series Map: Broken Walls; Gold; Turrets; Lord Take(s); Tortoise; Orange Buff; Purple Buff; MVP of the Match: Trolll (FLCN)			84.2k 9; 3; 2; 13; 15	

1-0 / 0-1; Round 1	10 January	Evil	0	–	1	Team Spirit	XO Hall
	19:00 (UTC+8)	Team Spirit, 1–0; Evil, 0–1					MPL Arena
		35.9k 0; 0; 1; 6; 5	Game Time: 14:03; Team Spirit wins the series Map: Expanding Rivers; Gold; Turrets; Lord Take(s); Tortoise; Orange Buff; Purple Buff; MVP of the Match: Sunsetlover (TS)			48.8k 8; 2; 2; 8; 10	

1-0 / 0-1; Round 1	10 January	Selangor Red Giants	1	–	0	CG Esports	XO Hall
	20:00 (UTC+8)	Selangor Red Giants, 1–0; CG Esports, 0–1					MPL Arena
		54.8k 9; 2; 3; 9; 9	Game Time: 14:45; Selangor Red Giants wins the series Map: Broken Walls; Gold; Turrets; Lord Take(s); Tortoise; Orange Buff; Purple Buff; MVP of the Match: Kramm (SRG)			38.5k 3; 0; 0; 3; 4	

1-0 / 0-1; Round 1	10 January	Aurora Gaming	0	–	1	Team Liquid	XO Hall
	21:00 (UTC+8)	Team Liquid, 1–0; Aurora Gaming, 0–1					MPL Arena
		46.0k 3; 1; 2; 7; 6	Game Time: 16:54; Team Liquid wins the series Map: Flying Clouds; Gold; Turrets; Lord Take(s); Tortoise; Orange Buff; Purple Buff; MVP of the Match: Sanji (TLPH)			56.0k 9; 1; 1; 8; 12	

1-0 / 0-1; Round 1	10 January	Alter Ego	1	–	0	Aurora Türkiye	XO Hall
	22:00 (UTC+8)	Alter Ego, 1–0; Aurora Türkiye, 0–1					MPL Arena
		78.9k 8; 3; 3; 14; 15	Game Time: 25:25; Alter Ego wins the series Map: Broken Walls; Gold; Turrets; Lord Take(s); Tortoise; Orange Buff; Purple Buff; MVP of the Match: Yazukee (AE)			73.4k 4; 1; 0; 10; 12	

=== Round 2 ===
1–1 / 0–2; Round 2	11 January	Boostgate Esports	0	–	1	Team Zone	XO Hall
	15:00 (UTC+8)	Team Zone, 1–1; Boostgate Esports, 0–2					MPL Arena
		32.9k 1; 0; 2; 4; 5	Game Time: 11:54; Team Zone wins the series Map: Dangerous Grass; Gold; Turrets; Lord Take(s); Tortoise; Orange Buff; Purple Buff; MVP of the Match: Bankai (Z1)			41.8k 8; 1; 1; 7; 6	

1–1 / 0–2; Round 2	11 January	Evil	1	–	0	DianFengYaoGuai	XO Hall
	16:00 (UTC+8)	Evil, 1–1; DianFengYaoGuai, 0–2					MPL Arena
		63.6k 8; 3; 2; 10; 9	Game Time: 19:53; Evil wins the series Map: Flying Clouds; Gold; Turrets; Lord Take(s); Tortoise; Orange Buff; Purple Buff; MVP of the Match: Seilah (EVIL)			60.5k 3; 0; 1; 8; 10	

2–0 / 1-1; Round 2	11 January	Team Falcons	0	–	1	Team Liquid	XO Hall
	17:00 (UTC+8)	Team Liquid, 2–0; Team Falcons, 1–1					MPL Arena
		53.7k 9; 2; 2; 9; 12	Game Time: 15:06; Team Liquid wins the series Map: Broken Walls; Gold; Turrets; Lord Take(s); Tortoise; Orange Buff; Purple Buff; MVP of the Match: Sanji (TL)			40.9k 0; 0; 1; 4; 3	

2-0 / 1-1; Round 2	11 January	Black Sentence Esports	0	–	1	Alter Ego	XO Hall
	18:00 (UTC+8)	Alter Ego, 2–0; Black Sentence Esports, 1–1					MPL Arena
		31.7k 0; 0; 0; 3; 2	Game Time: 12:24; Alter Ego wins the series Map: Dangerous Grass; Gold; Turrets; Lord Take(s); Tortoise; Orange Buff; Purple Buff; MVP of the Match: Nino (AE)			44.5k 9; 1; 3; 6; 10	

1–1 / 0–2; Round 2	11 January	CG Esports	0	–	1	Aurora Türkiye	XO Hall
	19:00 (UTC+8)	Aurora Gaming, 1–1; CG Esports, 0–2					MPL Arena
		41.8k 3; 0; 1; 7; 4	Game Time: 15:01; Aurora Gaming wins the series Map: Expanding Rivers; Gold; Turrets; Lord Take(s); Tortoise; Orange Buff; Purple Buff; MVP of the Match: Lunar (RORT)			50.2k 8; 2; 2; 6; 13	

2-0 / 1-1; Round 2	11 January	Selangor Red Giants	1	–	0	Team Spirit	XO Hall
	20:00 (UTC+8)	Selangor Red Giants, 2–0; Team Spirit, 1–1					MPL Arena
		46.6k 9; 1; 1; 6; 8	Game Time: 13:11; Selangor Red Giants wins the series Map: Expanding Rivers; Gold; Turrets; Lord Take(s); Tortoise; Orange Buff; Purple Buff; MVP of the Match: Innocent (SRG)			37.8k 1; 0; 2; 6; 5	

2-0 / 1-1; Round 2	11 January	ONIC Esports	0	–	1	Yangon Galacticos	XO Hall
	21:00 (UTC+8)	Yangon Galacticos, 2–0; ONIC Esports, 1–1					MPL Arena
		38.1k 0; 0; 1; 6; 7	Game Time: 14:11; Yangon Galacticos wins the series Map: Broken Walls; Gold; Turrets; Lord Take(s); Tortoise; Orange Buff; Purple Buff; MVP of the Match: Ying (YG)			46.3k 9; 1; 2; 7; 9	

1–1 / 0–2; Round 2	11 January	CFU Gaming	0	–	1	Aurora Gaming	XO Hall
	22:00 (UTC+8)	Aurora Gaming PH, 1–1; CFU Gaming, 0–2					MPL Arena
		63.6k 6; 1; 2; 10; 10	Game Time: 21:02; Aurora Gaming PH wins the series Map: Broken Walls; Gold; Turrets; Lord Take(s); Tortoise; Orange Buff; Purple Buff; MVP of the Match: Edward (RORA)			71.1k 9; 2; 1; 10; 12	

=== Round 3 ===
3–0 / 2-1; Round 3	12 January	Alter Ego	2	–	0	Yangon Galacticos	XO Hall
	19:00 (UTC+8)	Alter Ego, 3–0; Yangon Galacticos, 2–1					MPL Arena
		53.4k 9; 2; 2; 9; 10	Game Time: 16:45; Alter Ego leads the series Map: Dangerous Grass; Gold; Turrets; Lord Take(s); Tortoise; Orange Buff; Purple Buff; MVP of the Game: Nino (AE)			49.6k 4; 0; 1; 6; 6	
		52.7k 9; 2; 3; 12; 14	Game Time: 14:29; Alter Ego wins the series Map: Broken Walls; Gold; Turrets; Lord Take(s); Tortoise; Orange Buff; Purple Buff; MVP of the Game: Alekk (AE)			38.7k 0; 0; 0; 2; 1	

3–0 / 2-1; Round 3	13 January	Selangor Red Giants	2	–	1	Team Liquid	XO Hall
	19:00 (UTC+8)	Selangor Red Giants, 3–0; Team Liquid, 2–1					MPL Arena
		53.6k 3; 0; 3; 5; 7	Game Time: 18:46; Team Liquid leads the series Map: Flying Clouds; Gold; Turrets; Lord Take(s); Tortoise; Orange Buff; Purple Buff; MVP of the Game: Oheb (TL)			62.9k 9; 3; 0; 11; 10	
		49.6k 7; 1; 1; 8; 7	Game Time: 14:32; Series Tied; Map: Flying Clouds; Gold; Turrets; Lord Take(s); Tortoise; Orange Buff; Purple Buff; MVP of the Game: Sekys (SRG)			41.6k 0; 0; 2; 5; 5	
		87k 9; 3; 2; 11; 15	Game Time: 27:25; Selangor Red Giants wins the series Map: Expanding Rivers; Gold; Turrets; Lord Take(s); Tortoise; Orange Buff; Purple Buff; MVP of the Game: Stormie (SRG)			84.4k 0; 1; 0; 9; 10	

2–1 / 1–2; Round 3	12 January	Team Zone	0	–	1	Aurora Gaming	XO Hall
	18:00 (UTC+8)	Aurora Gaming, 2–1; Team Zone, 1–2					MPL Arena
		57k 4; 0; 0; 10; 5	Game Time: 19:31; Aurora Gaming wins the series Map: Flying Clouds; Gold; Turrets; Lord Take(s); Tortoise; Orange Buff; Purple Buff; MVP of the Match: Edward (RORA)			64.3k 9; 3; 3; 9; 13	

2–1 / 1–2; Round 3	13 January	Team Spirit	1	–	0	ONIC Esports	XO Hall
	18:00 (UTC+8)	Team Spirit, 2–1; ONIC Esports, 1–2					MPL Arena
		50.6k 8; 2; 1; 11; 8	Game Time: 14:56; Team Spirit wins the series Map: Expanding Rivers; Gold; Turrets; Lord Take(s); Tortoise; Orange Buff; Purple Buff; MVP of the Match: Kid Bomba (TS)			39.9k 1; 0; 2; 5; 7	

2–1 / 1–2; Round 3	12 January	Black Sentence Esports	0	–	1	Team Falcons	XO Hall
	17:00 (UTC+8)	Team Falcons, 2–1; Black Sentence Esports, 1–2					MPL Arena
		44.4k 1; 0; 0; 6; 7	Game Time: 17:07; Team Falcons wins the series Map: Expanding Rivers; Gold; Turrets; Lord Take(s); Tortoise; Orange Buff; Purple Buff; MVP of the Match: Cuffin (FLCN)			55.5k 9; 2; 3; 9; 9	

2–1 / 1–2; Round 3	13 January	Evil	0	–	1	Aurora Türkiye	XO Hall
	17:00 (UTC+8)	Aurora Türkiye, 2–1; Evil, 1–2					MPL Arena
		49.1k 2; 0; 2; 6; 5	Game Time: 17:58; Aurora Türkiye wins the series Map: Broken Walls; Gold; Turrets; Lord Take(s); Tortoise; Orange Buff; Purple Buff; MVP of the Match: Sigibum (RORT)			56.4k 8; 2; 1; 10; 14	

1–2 / 0–3; Round 3	12 January	CG Esports	2	–	0	DianFengYaoGuai	XO Hall
	15:00 (UTC+8)	CG Esports, 1–2; DianFengYaoGuai, 0–3					MPL Arena
		40k 8; 1; 3; 6; 8	Game Time: 10:56; CG Esports leads the series Map: Broken Walls; Gold; Turrets; Lord Take(s); Tortoise; Orange Buff; Purple Buff; MVP of the Game: CikuGais (CG)			29.1k 1; 0; 0; 3; 4	
		68.8k 8; 2; 3; 8; 14	Game Time: 21:45; CG Esports wins the series Map: Expanding Rivers; Gold; Turrets; Lord Take(s); Tortoise; Orange Buff; Purple Buff; MVP of the Game: Gary (CG)			64.1k 6; 1; 0; 12; 8	

1–2 / 0–3; Round 3	13 January	Boostgate Esports	0	–	2	CFU Gaming	XO Hall
	15:00 (UTC+8)	CFU Gaming, 1–2; Boostgate Esports, 0–3					MPL Arena
		39k 6; 1; 0; 7; 7	Game Time: 14:09; CFU Gaming leads the series Map: Expanding Rivers; Gold; Turrets; Lord Take(s); Tortoise; Orange Buff; Purple Buff; MVP of the Game: Wadu (CFU)			42.8k 4; 0; 3; 6; 7	
		35.2k 0; 0; 1; 5; 5	Game Time: 13:09; CFU Gaming wins the series Map: Dangerous Grass; Gold; Turrets; Lord Take(s); Tortoise; Orange Buff; Purple Buff; MVP of the Game: Detective (CFU)			43.7k 7; 1; 2; 6; 9	

=== Round 4 ===
3-1 / 2-2; Round 4	15 January	Team Falcons	1	–	2	Aurora Türkiye	XO Hall
	16:00 (UTC+8)	Aurora Türkiye, 3–1; Team Falcons, 2–2					MPL Arena
		35.9k 0; 1; 0; 5; 4	Game Time: 13:47; Aurora Türkiye leads the series Map: Dangerous Grass; Gold; Turrets; Lord Take(s); Tortoise; Orange Buff; Purple Buff; MVP of the Game: Tienzy (RORT)			48.4k 9; 1; 3; 8; 10	
		56.8k 6; 1; 2; 9; 4	Game Time: 18:35; Series Tied; Map: Expanding Rivers; Gold; Turrets; Lord Take(s); Tortoise; Orange Buff; Purple Buff; MVP of the Game: Saano (FLCN)			56.7k 6; 2; 1; 7; 13	
		58.3k 5; 2; 1; 10; 11	Game Time: 18:41; Aurora Türkiye wins the series Map: Flying Clouds; Gold; Turrets; Lord Take(s); Tortoise; Orange Buff; Purple Buff; MVP of the Game: Pagu (RORT)			53.2k 7; 1; 2; 8; 8	

3-1 / 2-2; Round 4	15 January	Aurora Gaming	2	–	0	Team Spirit	XO Hall
	18:00 (UTC+8)	Aurora Gaming, 3–1; Team Spirit, 2–2					MPL Arena
		65.1k 4; 0; 1; 9; 8	Game Time: 20:13; Aurora Gaming leads the series Map: Flying Clouds; Gold; Turrets; Lord Take(s); Tortoise; Orange Buff; Purple Buff; MVP of the Game: Edward (RORA)			63.7k 7; 3; 2; 9; 11	
		59.1k 9; 1; 2; 8; 11	Game Time: 17:55; Aurora Gaming wins the series Map: Expanding Rivers; Gold; Turrets; Lord Take(s); Tortoise; Orange Buff; Purple Buff; MVP of the Game: Light (RORA)			51.3k 4; 1; 1; 7; 4	

3-1 / 2-2; Round 4	15 January	Team Liquid	2	–	0	Yangon Galacticos	XO Hall
	20:00 (UTC+8)	Team Liquid, 3–1; Yangon Galacticos, 2–2					MPL Arena
		71.4k 9; 3; 3; 10; 13	Game Time: 00:00; Team Liquid leads the series Map: Expanding Rivers; Gold; Turrets; Lord Take(s); Tortoise; Orange Buff; Purple Buff; MVP of the Game: Sanford (TL)			59.4k 2; 0; 0; 11; 10	
		55.8k 9; 2; 3; 10; 10	Game Time: 15:31; Team Liquid wins the series Map: Broken Walls; Gold; Turrets; Lord Take(s); Tortoise; Orange Buff; Purple Buff; MVP of the Game: Sanford (TL)			44.2k 1; 0; 0; 4; 6	

2-2 / 1-3; Round 4	16 January	CFU Gaming	2	–	0	Team Zone	XO Hall
	16:00 (UTC+8)	CFU Gaming, 2–2; Team Zone, 1–3					MPL Arena
		57.8k 9; 3; 3; 8; 14	Game Time: 17:10; CFU Gaming leads the series Map: Broken Walls; Gold; Turrets; Lord Take(s); Tortoise; Orange Buff; Purple Buff; MVP of the Game: BOXI (CFU)			48.4k 1; 0; 0; 7; 3	
		79k 8; 2; 3; 12; 13	Game Time: 23:46; CFU Gaming wins the series Map: Dangerous Grass; Gold; Turrets; Lord Take(s); Tortoise; Orange Buff; Purple Buff; MVP of the Game: BOXI (CFU)			79.3k 9; 2; 0; 8; 8	

2-2 / 1-3; Round 4	16 January	Black Sentence Esports	1	–	2	CG Esports	XO Hall
	18:00 (UTC+8)	CG Esports, 2–2; Black Sentence Esports, 1–3					MPL Arena
		46.6k 1; 0; 0; 4; 3	Game Time: 16:21; CG Esports leads the series Map: Flying Clouds; Gold; Turrets; Lord Take(s); Tortoise; Orange Buff; Purple Buff; MVP of the Game: Gary (CG)			57.3k 9; 1; 3; 9; 14	
		53.6k 9; 2; 2; 10; 7	Game Time: 17:07; Series Tied; Map: Broken Walls; Gold; Turrets; Lord Take(s); Tortoise; Orange Buff; Purple Buff; MVP of the Game: Shin (BSE)			49.9k 5; 0; 1; 7; 10	
		53.2k 5; 0; 2; 7; 8	Game Time: 18:32; CG Esports wins the series Map: Broken Walls; Gold; Turrets; Lord Take(s); Tortoise; Orange Buff; Purple Buff; MVP of the Game: CikuGais (CG)			57.3k 8; 2; 1; 10; 11	

2-2 / 1-3; Round 4	16 January	Evil	0	–	2	ONIC Esports	XO Hall
	20:00 (UTC+8)	ONIC Esports, 2–2; Evil, 1–3					MPL Arena
		29.9k 0; 0; 0; 5; 5	Game Time: 11:27; ONIC Esports leads the series Map: Dangerous Grass; Gold; Turrets; Lord Take(s); Tortoise; Orange Buff; Purple Buff; MVP of the Game: Lutpii (ONIC)			42k 8; 1; 3; 6; 7	
		32.4k 1; 0; 2; 6; 5	Game Time: 12:43; ONIC Esports wins the series Map: Dangerous Grass; Gold; Turrets; Lord Take(s); Tortoise; Orange Buff; Purple Buff; MVP of the Game: Kairi (ONIC)			45.1k 9; 1; 1; 7; 8	

=== Round 5 ===
3-2 / 2-3; Round 5	17 January	Team Spirit	2	–	0	CFU Gaming	XO Hall
	16:00 (UTC+8)	Team Spirit, 3–2; CFU Gaming, 2–3					MPL Arena
		51.6k 9; 2; 3; 8; 10	Game Time: 13:58; Team Spirit leads the series Map: Dangerous Grass; Gold; Turrets; Lord Take(s); Tortoise; Orange Buff; Purple Buff; MVP of the Game: Kid Bomba (TS)			35.8k 0; 0; 0; 4; 4	
		51.6k 8; 1; 3; 8; 10	Game Time: 14:02; Team Spirit wins the series Map: Broken Walls; Gold; Turrets; Lord Take(s); Tortoise; Orange Buff; Purple Buff; MVP of the Game: Hiko (TS)			39.2k 1; 0; 0; 6; 5	

3-2 / 2-3; Round 5	17 January	Yangon Galacticos	2	–	0	CG Esports	XO Hall
	18:00 (UTC+8)	Yangon Galacticos, 3–2; CG Esports, 2–3					MPL Arena
		48.3k 9; 2; 2; 7; 11	Game Time: 13:21; Yangon Galacticos leads the series Map: Dangerous Grass; Gold; Turrets; Lord Take(s); Tortoise; Orange Buff; Purple Buff; MVP of the Game: Ying (YG)			34.9k 0; 0; 1; 5; 2	
		71.2k 8; 3; 3; 9; 11	Game Time: 23:36; Yangon Galacticos wins the series Map: Expanding Rivers; Gold; Turrets; Lord Take(s); Tortoise; Orange Buff; Purple Buff; MVP of the Game: Stitch (YG)			71.2k 3; 0; 0; 11; 12	

3-2 / 2-3; Round 5	17 January	Team Falcons	1	–	2	ONIC Esports	XO Hall
	20:00 (UTC+8)	ONIC Esports, 3–2; Team Falcons, 2–3					MPL Arena
		24.9k 2; 0; 1; 4; 3	Game Time: 11:52; ONIC Esports leads the series Map: Expanding Rivers; Gold; Turrets; Lord Take(s); Tortoise; Orange Buff; Purple Buff; MVP of the Game: Kairi (ONIC)			43.8k 8; 1; 2; 7; 8	
		75.8k 8; 2; 3; 12; 15	Game Time: 23:07; Series Tied; Map: Broken Walls; Gold; Turrets; Lord Take(s); Tortoise; Orange Buff; Purple Buff; MVP of the Game: Troll (FLCN)			64.8k 4; 2; 0; 9; 7	
		29.8k 0; 0; 0; 3; 3	Game Time: 12:08; ONIC Esports wins the series Map: Broken Walls; Gold; Turrets; Lord Take(s); Tortoise; Orange Buff; Purple Buff; MVP of the Game: Skylar (ONIC)			42.3k 8; 1; 3; 8; 8	

=== Bracket ===
All bracket stage matches were either a Best of 1 or Best of 3. The winning team will qualify in the upper portion of the Swiss bracket until the first top two teams whom have an undefeated record advance to the knockout stage. Three teams would follow suit and will qualify in the second round of qualifiers and the final three teams with a 3-2 record will qualify for the knockouts.

Indonesian runner-ups Alter Ego Esports qualified for the knockout stage after a 2–0 win over Myanmar's Yangon Galacticos. Alter Ego Esports are joined by Selangor Red Giants after an upset 2-1 win over the heavily favored Team Liquid PH

Advance to knockouts
2–0	Alter Ego
1–0	Alter Ego	2	Selangor Red Giants
0–0	Selangor Red Giants	1	Yangon Galacticos	0	Advance to knockouts
Alter Ego	1	Team Spirit	0	Selangor Red Giants	2	2–1	Aurora Türkiye
Aurora Türkiye	0	Team Falcons	0	Team Liquid	1	Aurora Gaming	2	Aurora Gaming
Aurora Gaming	0	Team Liquid	1	Team Spirit	0	Team Liquid
Team Liquid	1	Black Sentence Esports	0	1–1	Team Liquid	2	Advance to knockouts
Selangor Red Giants	1	Alter Ego	1	Team Zone	0	Yangon Galacticos	0	2–2	Team Spirit
CG Esports	0	ONIC Esports	0	Aurora Gaming	1	Team Falcons	1	Yangon Galacticos	2	Yangon Galacticos
Team Zone	0	Yangon Galacticos	1	Team Spirit	1	Aurora Türkiye	2	CG Esports	0	ONIC Esports
Yangon Galacticos	1	ONIC Esports	0	Team Spirit	2
Evil	0	0–1	Black Sentence Esports	0	1–2	CFU Gaming	0	Eliminated
Team Spirit	1	Boostgate Esports	0	Team Falcons	1	ONIC Esports	2	Team Falcons	1	CFU Gaming
DianFengYaoGuai	0	Team Zone	1	Evil	0	Evil	0	ONIC Esports	2	CG Esports
Team Falcons	1	Evil	1	Aurora Türkiye	1	CG Esports	2	Team Falcons
ONIC Esports	1	DianFengYaoGuai	0	Black Sentence Esports	1	Eliminated
Boostgate Esports	0	CG Esports	0	0–2	CFU Gaming	2	Team Zone
Black Sentence	1	Aurora Türkiye	1	CG Esports	2	Team Zone	0	Black Sentence Esports
CFU Gaming	0	CFU Gaming	0	DianFengYaoGuai	0	Evil
Aurora Gaming	1	Boostgate Esports	0	Eliminated
CFU Gaming	2	DianFengYaoGuai
Boostgate Esports

== Knockout Stage ==
Similarly to its predecessor M6, the knockout bracket system carries over to the M7 World Championship knockout stage. Formerly–during M5–the Upper Bracket Quarterfinals was played as a Best-of-5 like its immediately succeeding rounds, however, since M6, the upper bracket quarterfinals have since transitioned to a Best of 3. It is the only best-of-three in the entire knockout stage.

Upper Bracket Quarterfinals (Best of 3)	Upper Bracket Semifinals (Best of 5)	Upper Bracket Finals (Best of 5)	Grand Finals (Best of 7)
Match 4 (18 Jan)
Alter Ego	2
Match 6 (21 Jan)
ONIC Esports	0
Alter Ego	1
Match 1 (18 Jan)
Aurora Gaming	3
Team Liquid	1
Match 9 (22 Jan)
Aurora Gaming	2
Aurora Gaming	3
Match 3 (18 Jan)
Selangor Red Giants	2
Selangor Red Giants	2
Match 5 (21 Jan)
Team Spirit	0
Selangor Red Giants	3
Match 2 (18 Jan)
Aurora Türkiye	2
Aurora Türkiye	2	Match 14 (25 Jan)
Yangon Galacticos	0	Aurora Gaming	4
Alter Ego	0
Lower Bracket Knockouts (Best of 5)	Lower Bracket Quarterfinals (Best of 5)	Lower Bracket Semifinals (Best of 5)	Lower Bracket Finals (Best of 5)
Match 10 (23 Jan)
Match 8 (22 Jan)	Aurora Türkiye	1	Match 13 (24 Jan)
ONIC Esports	1	Team Liquid	3	Match 12 (24 Jan)	Selangor Red Giants	1
Team Liquid	3	Team Liquid	2	Alter Ego	3
Match 11 (23 Jan)	Alter Ego	3
Match 7 (22 Jan)	Alter Ego	3
Team Spirit	3	Team Spirit	1
Yangon Galacticos	0

== Sponsorships ==
The MLBB M7 World Championships consists of several international brands and products. Its headlining sponsor is Visa Inc. being the official payment partner of the world championship, making its official entry to MLBB.

Powered and Organized by	Moonton
Official Payment Partner	Visa Inc.
Official Gaming Phone	Realme
Official Jewelry Partner	Fairrie
Official Gaming Chair	Secretlab
Official Merchandise Partner	1Play
Official Energy Drink Partner	Red Bull

== See also ==
- MPL Philippines
- 2025 MPL Philippines season
- MPL Indonesia
- MSC 2025
- MSC 2023
- Mobile Legends: Bang Bang World Championship
- MLBB M6 World Championship
- MLBB M5 World Championship
- MLBB M4 World Championship
