= Aurora Gaming =

Serbian esports organization

- Short name: Aurora
- Divisions: Apex Legends; Counter-Strike 2; Dota 2; Valorant; Mobile Legends: Bang Bang
- Founded: 2022
- Location: Serbia; Philippines and Turkey (MLBB teams)
- Colors: Cyan, black
- Main sponsor: 1xBet
- Website: auroragg.com

Aurora Gaming, or simply Aurora (stylized in all caps), is an esports organization. Founded in Serbia in 2022, Aurora currently fields professional rosters in Apex Legends, Counter-Strike 2 (CS2), Dota 2, Warcraft III, Free Fire, Valorant and Mobile Legends: Bang Bang (MLBB) competitions. Its MLBB teams are based in the Philippines and Turkey.

== Founding and sponsor ==
Aurora Gaming was founded in 2022 in Serbia. Their main sponsor/partner is 1xBet. In November 2023, their CS2 roster appeared in an ad campaign with Russian adult film actress Eva Elfie; the ad received criticism, with some fans calling it "misogynistic". 1xBet is one of both Aurora's and Elfie's main sponsors.

== History in Apex Legends ==
A Serbian org, Aurora competes in the EMEA region for the Apex Legends Global Series (ALGS) competition.

=== ALGS Year 3 ===
Aurora played with an all-Russian squad to being the 2022–23 (ALGS Year 3) season, with the players previously competing on Team Empire roster, from which they were dropped when Team Empire left competitive Apex in August 2022. On 4 November, Aurora signed the roster consisting of "RANCHES", "cleaveee", and "Maliwan".

In EMEA play, Aurora was dominant during Split 1, winning the region. This qualified them for the Split 1 playoffs, but they encountered visa issues which marred Aurora all season. These visa issues rendered them unable to play in the ALGS Split 1 Playoffs, held in London.

During the ALGS Split 2 Pro League, Aurora had a middling performance and Alexey "Mailwan" Rusinov stepped down from the active roster, with Danila "Sunset" Soloviov filling the vacant roster spot. Their performance improved and they were able to qualify for the Split 2 Playoffs as the EMEA region's ninth seed. However, visa issues further complicated Aurora's competitive efforts, as Sunset was forced to miss the ALGS Split 2 Playoffs. Maliwan returned and filled-in for Sunset during the competition. In the 2023 ALGS Split 2 Playoffs, they selected drop spots alongside other teams on both the Storm Point and World's Edge maps. After a 31st-place finish in the Split 2 Playoffs, Aurora disbanded the roster in August.

Later in the month, Aurora would re-enter Apex competition, signing the then free agent Fire Beavers roster. This team consisted of Kiryl "9impulse" Kostsiu, Lev "taskmast33r" Grigoriev, and Syvatoslav "ojrein" Korochinsky, with the former playing as the team's captain. They qualified for the 2023 ALGS Championship, held in Birmingham. However, visa issues once again came into play, with Jose "Uxako" Llosa and Keenan "Tax" Mackey, serving as substitutes for Aurora. Ultimately, 9impulse received his visa, though taskmast33r was denied entry to the U.K. They instead began the tournament with "Uxako" playing the third spot on their roster. Internal team disagreements with Uxako occurred and after the group stage, Aurora attempted to make a swap to Tax. However, ALGS officials denied Aurora's roster swap. As Uxako was registered as a starting player for Aurora in the tournament, a swap to a sub was only allowed in a case such as illness. 9impulse and ojrein would finish the tournament playing as a duo, and Aurora finished the Championship in a disappointing 36th-place.

=== ALGS Year 4 ===
In December, Aurora benched taskmast33r. Konstantin "Hardecki" Kozlov would complete the Aurora roster as their third player. During EMEA regional play in the Split 1 Pro League, the team performed well, securing a spot in the Split 1 Playoffs. In March 2024, 9impulse requested Apex Legends publisher Electronic Arts (EA) to send out official invites to the 2024 ALGS Split 1 Playoffs LAN location, in order for players to be proactive in applying for travel visas. Other pro players spoke up in solidarity of 9impulse.

Heading into the 2024 ALGS Split 1 Playoffs, Hadley Vincent of Dot Esports wrote that "Aurora is known by most as a wildcard team", and cited professional player "Zer0" of DarkZero concurring with that assessment. They are also known as an aggressive team, with their play notably unorthodox in relation to the game's meta.

== In Counter-Strike 2 and Dota 2 ==
Aurora Gaming also fields rosters in Counter-Strike 2 (CS2) and Dota 2. Aurora's CS2 roster won the Skyesports Masters 2024 tournament, defeating OG by a score of 3–1. The win clinched a berth in the Skyesports Championship 2024 tournament.

On 13 November 2023, Aurora signed the former Talon Esports roster, the strongest in the Southeast Asia (SEA) region, after Talon and the roster mutually agreed to part ways. The roster consisted of Nuengnara "23savage" Teeramahanon, (Note: Teermahanon's handle is now listed as "23" on Aurora's website.) Armel "Armel" Tabios, Anucha "Jabz" Jirawong, Worawit "Q" Mekchai, and Chan "Oli" Chon Kien. In March 2024, Armel was benched. Aurora shortly thereafter announced Artem "Lorenof" Melnik as their new mid laner.

On 5 April 2025, Aurora acquired Turkish organization Eternal Fire's Counter-Strike 2 roster.

== In Valorant ==
Aurora Gaming entered the Valorant scene on October 28th 2026. Fielding a roster of Tier 1 and Tier 2 talent. The roster consists of Nikita "Derke" Niko Sirmitev, Ričardas "Boo" Lukaševičius, Nikita "trexx" Cherednichenko, Vitaliy "B1SK" Emelyanov, and Egor "chiwa" Stepanyuk.

== In Mobile Legends: Bang Bang ==
Aurora Gaming joined the Philippine Mobile Legends: Bang Bang league, MPL Philippines, and its Turkish counterpart, MTC Türkiye Championship. On 27 July 2024, Aurora unveiled their official Filipino Mobile Legends: Bang Bang roster for Season 14 at PARQAL, Aseana City, Parañaque. The roster consists of Edward Jay "Edward" Dapadap, Jonard "Demonkite" Caranto, Kenneth Carl "Yue" Tadeo, Jan Dominic "Domengkite" Delmundo, Ben Seloe "Benthings" Dizon Maglaque, and Renejay "Renejay" Barcase.

== Rosters ==
Aurora Gaming rosters

Chess
Handle	Name	Nationality
Ian Nepomniachtchi	Ian Alexandrovich Nepomniachtchi	Russia

Counter-Strike
Handle	Name	Nationality
XANTARES	İsmailcan Dörtkardeş	Turkey
Wicadia	Ali Haydar Yalçın	Turkey
woxic	Özgür Eker	Turkey
Jimpphat	Jimi Salo	Finland
kyxsan	Damjan Stoilkovski	North Macedonia
MAJ3R (I)	Engin Küpeli	Turkey
soulfly (I)	Caner Kesici	Turkey

Dota 2
Handle	Name	Nationality
Skiter	Oliver Lepko	Slovakia
TORONTOTOKYO	Alexander Khertek	Russia
Mira	Myroslav Kolpakov	Ukraine
Oli	Chan Chon Kien	Malaysia
kiyotaka	Gleb Zyryanov	Russia

Mobile Legends: Bang Bang Philippines
Handle	Name	Nationality
Nathzz	Nathanael Estrologo	Philippines
Koyl	Kyle Reyes	Philippines
Demonkite (L)	Jonard Cedrix Caranto	Philippines
Yue	Kenneth Carl Tadeo	Philippines
Domeng	Jan Dominic Del Delmundo	Philippines
Light	Dylan Aaron Catipon	Philippines
Yecs	Justin Ericson Yecla	Philippines

Mobile Legends: Bang Bang Turkey
Handle	Name	Nationality
Mezun	Mehmet Semih Cengiz	Turkey
Lunar	Mehmet Ibrahim Ilgun	Turkey
Tienzy	Sidar Menteşe	Turkey
Rosa	Ahmet Taha Batır	Turkey
Sigibum	Şiyar Akbulut	Turkey
Pagu	Lukasz Bigus	Poland

Warcraft
Handle	Name	Nationality
Happy	Dmitry Kostin	Russia
Natakoop	Ahmad Bircanov	Uzbekistan
Egarcan	Ege Küçükserin	Turkey

"Valorant"
Handle	Name	Nationality
Derke	Nikita Niko Sirmitev	Finland
Boo	Ričardas Lukaševičius	Lithuania
trexx	Nikita Cherednichenko	Russia
B1SK	Vitaliy Emelyanov	Russia
chiwa	Egor Stepanyuk	Russia

Legend:
- (I) Inactive
- (S) Suspended
- (L) On loan
- (2W) Two-way player
- Substitute
- (injured) Injury / Illness

== Notes ==
Awards and achievements
Preceded by ONIC Philippines	MLBB World Champion; M7 - 2026	Succeeded by Defending champions
