= Mobile Legends: Bang Bang World Championship =

Esports tournament

Tournament information
- Game: Mobile Legends: Bang Bang
- Location: Worldwide
- Established: 2019
- Number of tournaments: 7
- Administrator: Moonton
- Tournament formats: Group stage; Single round-robin (2019–2023); Swiss stage (2024–present); Main event; Double elimination (2019–present)
- Venues: Kuala Lumpur (M1 and M6: 2019, 2024); Singapore (M2 and M3: 2020, 2021); Jakarta (M4 and M7: 2022, 2025); Manila (M5: 2023)
- Participants: 16 teams (M1, M3–M4); 12 teams (M2); 22 teams (M5, M7); 23 teams (M6)
- Website: worlds.mobilelegends.com

Current champion
- (Philippines) Aurora Gaming (1st title)

Most recent tournament
- M7 2025

The Mobile Legends: Bang Bang World Championship (abbreviated as M Series) is the annual professional Mobile Legends: Bang Bang world esports championship tournament for the game wherein teams worldwide would be facing off each other to become the world champion for Mobile Legends: Bang Bang. The yearly tournament is presented by Moonton and has been held seven times.

The M7 World Championship in January 2026 reached over 5.68 million peak concurrent viewers—a new record for mobile esports to become most-watched mobile esports tournament in history. The event surpassed its own previous viewership record on three occasions.

Aurora Gaming are the current world champions after delivering the first sweep in the Grand Finals in four years. The Filipino runners-up swept Indonesian runners-up Alter Ego Esports at the venue of the M4 World Championship, Tennis Indoor Senayan. This makes Aurora the sixth–consecutive Filipino world champion and the fifth organization to win the world championship, prolonging Philippine dominance over MLBB for an unprecedented five years.

The next edition of the tournament, M8 World Championship, will be hosted in January 2027, in Turkey—the first time the M Series takes place in both Europe and Western Asia due to Turkey being a transcontinental country. Meanwhile, the M8 Wild Card will debut in Thailand, which will also mark the country's first M Series event.

== Background ==
The first World Championship was held in Kuala Lumpur in Malaysia. Over 16 teams competed from Asia, South America and Europe namely Brazil, Cambodia, Indonesia, Japan, Laos, Malaysia, Myanmar, the Philippines, Russia, Thailand, the United States and Vietnam. In the end, Indonesian representatives EVOS Legends and Rex Regum Qeon battled in the Grand Finals by a Best of 7. In the Finals, EVOS Legends would go on to win the World Championship in 7 Games and they were named as the inaugural world champions. With the Prize Pool at $250,000, Team EVOS Legends would go on to bring home $80,000, and the MVP winning $3,000.

The Second World Championship were set to be held in a public venue before the COVID-19 pandemic hit worldwide that had cancelled the public M2 World Championship games. However, the Second Championship were to continue as it was held on January 18 to 24, 2021. The original venue of the Second World Championship were to be in Jakarta in Indonesia but was moved to Singapore. M2 featured over 12 teams from different nations from the entire world like Brazil and Russia, but was completely dominated by Asia-based esports teams like Cambodia, Indonesia, Japan, Malaysia, Myanmar, the Philippines, and Singapore. The defending champions of EVOS Legends did not participate in the said Championship, however, their Singaporean branch qualified to compete. Among the twelve teams, the Philippines esports team Bren Esports was crowned the champion by defeating Burmese Ghouls in seven games.

The Third World Championship was held in Singapore for the second time on December 6–19, 2021.

== History ==
=== The M1 World Championship ===
The first world championship was held in Kuala Lumpur in Malaysia wherein over 16 teams flew to Malaysia and competed for the title of World Champion in Mobile Legends: Bang Bang. M1 marked the first ever world-wide competition for Mobile Legends: Bang Bang. Through Local Qualifiers and Professional Esports Leagues, the first iteration of MLBB's world series was primarily made up of teams from Brazil, Cambodia, Indonesia, Japan, Laos, Malaysia, Myanmar, the Philippines, Russia, Singapore, Thailand, Turkey and Vietnam. The Mobile Legends: Bang Bang Professional League (MPL) sent two teams from Indonesia, Malaysia/Singapore, Myanmar and the Philippines. The tournament was held from November 10 to 17, 2019. With a prize pool of $250,000, the games began with the Group Stages wherein teams were drawn and divided before the competition into four groups, each containing 4 teams. These teams would face off each other to fight for a spot in both the upper and lower brackets of the playoffs. Two teams would advance and two teams would be eliminated from the group stages. Indonesia's two representatives, EVOS Legends and RRQ (Rex Regum Qeon), Myanmar's Burmese Ghouls, and Malaysia's Todak, managed to qualify for the upper bracket spots, while Japan's 10s Gaming+, The Philippine's Sunsparks, Vietnam's VEC Fantasy Main, and Malaysia' other representative Axis Esports qualified for the remaining playoff spots in the lower bracket.

The first ever grand finals of the world series saw the representatives of the same country, EVOS Legends and RRQ (Rex Regum Qeon) of Indonesia, in a long, best-of-seven series. EVOS Legends became the first World Champions after winning against RRQ in a tight matchup that went all the way to 7 games. EVOS Legends would bring home $80,000 and an additional $3,000 for the finals MVP of the tournament, Eko “Oura” Julianto.

=== The M2 World Championship ===
The second iteration of the world series was originally going to take place in Jakarta, Indonesia but was postponed and moved to Shangri-La Hotel in Singapore due to the COVID-19 pandemic. Then-Current Champions EVOS Legends failed to qualify for M2 after being eliminated from the playoffs of the sixth season of MPL-ID. In EVOS' absence, RRQ Hoshi and Alter Ego, the two grand finalists of the sixth season, represented Indonesia at M2, carrying on the heavy burden of defending Indonesia's throne as the best region in the world. The Second World Championship welcomed a narrowed down total of 12 teams to Singapore to compete and become the new world champions. Teams of the United States, Laos, Vietnam and Turkey did not represent their countries and teams in the second edition of the games. The prize pool for the second iteration was increased from $250,000 to $300,000. With the same format as the first World Championship, the Games were held from 18 to 24 January 2021 after its dates were moved to wait for the easing of COVID-19 pandemic the restrictions in Singapore. Among the 12 teams, the Philippines' own Bren Esports and Myanmar's Burmese Ghouls qualified to battle in the Grand Finals. After a grueling series that lasted for 7 games just like M1, Bren Esports proudly secured the championship after pulling off a massive victory in the tightly matched final game, making them the first ever Filipino team to win the MLBB world title. Later on, Moonton would also release a limited edition Bren Esports skin in honor of Bren's victory, a privilege that Moonton also handed to EVOS Legends after they won the first world Championship in 2019 as a tribute to their victory. Ultimately, Bren chose their signature jungle hero Lancelot for their honorary skin as a tribute to the finals MVP of the tournament, Karl "KarlTzy" Gabriel Nepomuceno.

=== The M3 World Championship ===
The third iteration of the world series ran from December 6 to 19, 2021. M3 marked the second time the world series for Mobile Legends took place in Singapore. It was also held offline. Similar to its first iteration, M3 welcomed 16 teams from different regions around the world to compete and become the best team in the world. New MPL franchise teams like SeeYouSoon from MPL Cambodia, as well as RED Canids and Vivo Keyd from MPL Brazil, participated in the tournament. Moreover, non-MPL teams from the United States, Russia, Middle East, and Latin America (LATAM) also joined the bid for the world title. Unlike M2, Myanmar and Japan were not able to join the third edition of the world championship. Additionally, M3 saw the prize pool increase from $300,000 to $800,000.

After two grueling weeks of world-class action in the land of dawn, Blacklist International was hailed as the new world champions after defeating their fellow countrymen ONIC Philippines with a clean 4–0 sweep, breaking the tradition of the final match of the world championship going all the way to 7 games. Blacklist International's total shutout against Onic PH would mark the first ever sweep in the grand finals of the world stage. The M3 finals also marked the second time the world championship had representatives from the same nation become the grand finalists. Kiel "Oheb" Calvin Q. Soriano, the team's Gold Laner who was notoriously known throughout the tournament as the "Filipino Sniper", was crowned as the finals MVP. When he was asked which hero he wanted for Blacklist's honorary skin, he chose Estes, which is the team's signature pick and the very engine of their infamous "UBE" strategy. With their triumphant victory, Blacklist International became the second Filipino team to win the world title.

Blacklist International is the first team to win the World Championship that has disbanded its MLBB roster in 2025.

=== The M4 World Championship ===
The fourth iteration of the Mobile Legends: Bang Bang world series began on 1 January and ended on the 15th of the same month in 2023. The fourth global tournament was held in Jakarta, Indonesia. Like its M1 and M3 counterpart, the tournament was played in an offline setup. It featured 16 teams from different regions around the world. MPL-franchise teams from Indonesia, Philippines, Malaysia, Singapore, Cambodia, Brazil, and MENA (Middle East and North Africa), as well as non-MPL qualifiers from the United States, Latin America, and Mekong (Myanmar, Lao PDR, Thailand, and Vietnam) will participate.

The prize pool was similar to the M3 World Championships, amounting to US$800,000.

In the final match up, two Filipino teams meet once again at the grand stage to claim the M4 World Championship. Defending champions and upper bracket finalists Blacklist International battled lower bracket winners ECHO Philippines in a best-of-seven series. After a world-class performance, ECHO Philippines won the championship against the defending champion Blacklist by sweeping the latter with a 4–0 run. Benedict "Bennyqt" Gonzales won the finals MVP award.

=== The M5 World Championship ===
As revealed in the latest MLBB Esports 2023 roadmap, the fifth iteration of the Mobile Legends: Bang Bang world series will be held in the Philippines in December 2023.

The Philippines and Malaysia became the official hosts for the MLBB M5 World championships with the Philippines holding the major events such as the group and knockout stages while Malaysia will hold the first MLBB World Championship Wild Card matches. The Philippines will hold the Group Stage and Knockouts at the EVM Convention Center from December 2 to 12 while the Grand Finals will occur in the Rizal Memorial Coliseum, the venue for several Southeast Asian Games venues in 2019.

Prior to the M5 World Championships, Moonton, the game developers of MLBB announced the votings for the M-Series 5th Anniversary 10 Greatest Players Award, individual recognition and awards for players who made significant impacts for the game and their country during the course of the MLBB World Championships. Certain controversies plagued the nomination process for the awards from Filipino players Johnmar "OhMyV33Nus" Villaluna and Danerie James "Wise" Del Rosario for their affiliation with the online-betting site Rivalry and the snubbing of the MLBB M3 World Championships Finals MVP, Kiel Calvin "OHEB" Soriano. The VEEWISE duo, as Villaluna and Del Rosario are known for, argued that Burmese nominee and MLBB player Naing Lin "ACE" Swe was affiliated to a different online-betting site which violated certain criteria released by Moonton. This caused allegations and heated conversations from both Filipino and Burmese fans. On 10 November, Swe announced his withdrawal from the nomination and Moonton later released an announcement regarding his withdrawal.

The awardee winners were released on 10 December 2023.

The Grand Finals saw the first Philippines vs. Indonesia match in the entirety of the M-Series. The Philippines' AP Bren won the MLBB M5 World Championships, defeating upper bracket foe ONIC Esports in seven games despite AP Bren holding a 3–1 series lead prior to ONIC's Game 7 push. Regardless, AP Bren became the first organization to win two world titles and the first team to win the world championships on home soil.

=== The M6 World Championship ===
The MLBB M6 World Championships returned to Malaysia for this iteration of the tournament. Malaysia previously hosted the M1 World Championships in 2019 in Kuala Lumpur. Malaysia's hosting of the MLBB M6 World Championships is significant for the country's continual success in the MLBB scene where they defeated powerhouses Philippines and Indonesia in their campaign for international championships in MSC 2024 and at the IESF World Championships where Malaysian representatives defeated Philippine representatives twice.

The M6 World Championship featured the second edition of the wild card system where a pool of teams from different competing regions will have the chance to qualify to the newly adopted Swiss Stage. The Swiss Stage is a set of tournament draws and matches of Best of 1s and 3s to determine teams that will qualify to the knockout stage. The Swiss Stage is used as the system format for the League of Legends World Championship since the 2023 edition.

The M6 World Championship is the first iteration since M1 that the Philippines only had one team to qualify for the knockout stage. This has not happened since 2019 with succeeding editions featuring at least two Filipino teams in the knockout stage or even in the Finals. This edition also featured the first two-team pool from the Turkish region where S2G Esports and Ulfhednar qualified for Swiss.

The Philippines' Fnatic ONIC Philippines clinched a 3–1 upper bracket series victory over Indonesian champions Team Liquid ID. They advanced to the Grand Finals, marking the fifth-consecutive year that the Philippines has made it to a world championship finals series. Fnatic ONIC Philippines have made it to their best finish yet in the Worlds series as they secure second place during M3. A rematch between Team Liquid ID and Fnatic ONIC Philippines was held in the Grand Finals, where ONIC ultimately won in five games, 4–1. This is the second-consecutive series that a Filipino and Indonesian team matched up in the Grand Finals.

=== The M7 World Championship ===
The Mobile Legends: Bang Bang M7 World Championship was held from January 3 to 25, 2026, in Jakarta, Indonesia. The tournament featured 22 teams from 14 core and wildcard regions worldwide, representing Asia, the Americas, Europe, and Africa.

The Grand Finals reached over 5.68 million peak concurrent viewers to become most-watched mobile esports tournament in history, breaking the all-time viewership record for a mobile esports tournament previously set by the 2021 Free Fire World Series in Singapore. Aurora Gaming Philippines defeated Alter Ego Esports 4–0 to claim the Philippines' sixth consecutive world title. Roamer Dylan "Light" Catipon is awarded the Finals MVP.

== Viewership ==
| Edition | Peak viewers | | Hours watched | Average viewers | Air time | Prize pool |
|---|---|---|---|---|---|---|
| M1 | 648,069 | | 9,939,023 | 162,050 | 61 hours | $250,000 |
| M2 | 3,083,245 | | 42,706,210 | 689,737 | 62 hours | $300,000 |
| M3 | 3,191,404 | | 62,618,894 | 602,588 | 104 hours | $800,000 |
| M4 | 4,270,270 | | 79,686,798 | 802,217 | 99 hours | $800,000 |
| M5 | Wildcard event | 271,822 | 3,825,344 | 100,009 | 38 hours | $900,000 |
| M5 | Main event | 5,067,107 | 72,160,063 | 475,259 | 151 hours | $900,000 |
| M6 | Wildcard event | 344,871 | 3,531,383 | 144,630 | TBD | $1,000,000 |
| M6 | Main event | 4,017,453 | 85,474,144 | 708,839 | 120 hours | $1,000,000 |
| M7 | 5,680,511 | | 135,559,616 | 1,054,255 | 128 hours | $1,000,000 |

== Participating regions ==
The number in each box represents the number of teams by region.

| Region | M1 | M2 | M3 | M4 | M5 | | M6 | | M7 | | Editions |
| Region | M1 | M2 | M3 | M4 | Groups | Wildcard | Groups | Wildcard | Groups | Wildcard | Editions |
|---|---|---|---|---|---|---|---|---|---|---|---|
| Argentina | – | – | – | 1 | – | 1 | 1 | – | - | - | 3 |
| Brazil | 1 | 1 | 2 | 1 | 2 | – | – | 1 | - | - | 6 |
| Cambodia | 1 | 1 | 1 | 1 | 1 | – | 1 | – | 1 | - | 7 |
| China | – | – | – | – | – | 1 | 1 | 1 | 1 | 1 | 4 |
| Chile | - | - | - | - | - | - | - | - | 1 | - | 1 |
| Commonwealth of Independent States | – | – | 1 | – | 1 | 1 | 1 | 1 | 1 | - | 5 |
| Indonesia | 2 | 2 | 2 | 2 | 2 | – | 2 | – | 2 | - | 8 |
| Japan | 1 | 1 | – | – | – | – | – | – | - | 1 | 3 |
| Laos | 1 | – | – | – | – | 1 | – | 1 | - | 1 | 4 |
| Malaysia | 2 | 1 | 2 | 2 | 1 | 1 | 2 | – | 2 | - | 8 |
| Middle East and North Africa | – | – | 1 | 1 | 1 | 1 | 1 | 1 | 1 | 1 | 7 |
| Mongolia | – | – | – | – | – | 1 | – | 1 | - | 1 | 3 |
| Myanmar | 1 | 1 | – | 1 | – | 1 | 1 | – | 1 | - | 6 |
| Nepal | – | – | – | – | – | 1 | – | – | - | - | 1 |
| Peru | – | – | 1 | 1 | – | – | – | – | - | - | 2 |
| Philippines | 2 | 2 | 2 | 2 | 2 | – | 2 | – | 2 | - | 8 |
| Russia | 1 | 1 | – | – | – | 1 | 1 | – | - | 1 | 5 |
| Singapore | 1 | 2 | 2 | 1 | 1 | – | 1 | – | 1 | - | 7 |
| Turkey | 1 | – | 1 | 1 | 1 | – | 1 | 1 | 1 | 1 | 7 |
| United States | 1 | – | 1 | 1 | 1 | – | 1 | – | - | - | 5 |
| Vietnam | 1 | – | – | 1 | – | – | – | 1 | - | 1 | 4 |

== Participating teams ==
=== M1 World Championship (2019) ===
| Team | Seed |
|---|---|
| (Brazil) GeO Esports | Brazil Local Qualifiers |
| (Cambodia) Impunity KH | Cambodia Local Qualifiers |
| (Indonesia) EVOS Legends | MPL-ID S4 Champion |
| (Indonesia) RRQ Hoshi | MPL-ID S4 Runner-Up |
| (Japan) 10s Gaming+ | Japan Local Qualifiers |
| (Laos) Candy Comeback | Thailand and Laos Local Qualifiers |
| (Malaysia) Todak | MPL-MY Runner-up |
| (Malaysia) Axis Esports | MPL-MY 4th place |
| (Myanmar) Burmese Ghouls | MPL-MM S3 Champion |
| (Philippines) Sunsparks | MPL-PH S4 Champion |
| (Philippines) ONIC Esports PH | MPL-PH S4 Runner-up |
| (Russia) Deus Vult | Russia Local Qualifiers |
| (Singapore) EVOS Esports SG | MPL-SG S4 Champion |
| (Turkey) Evil Esports | Turkey Local Qualifiers |
| (United States) Team Gosu | US Local Qualifiers |
| (Vietnam) VEC Fantasy Main | 360 Mobi Championship S3 Champion |

=== M2 World Championship (2020) ===
| Team | Seed |
|---|---|
| DreamMax Esports | Brazil Local Qualifiers |
| (Cambodia) Impunity KH | Cambodia Local Qualifiers |
| (Indonesia) RRQ Hoshi | MPL-ID S6 Champion |
| (Indonesia) Alter Ego Esports | MPL-ID S6 Runner-Up |
| (Japan) 10s Gaming Frost | Japan Local Qualifiers |
| (Malaysia) Todak | MPL-MY/SG S6 Champion |
| (Myanmar) Burmese Ghouls | MPL-MM S5 Champion |
| (Philippines) Bren Esports | MPL-PH S6 Champion |
| (Philippines) OMEGA Esports | MPL-PH S6 Runner-Up |
| (Russia) Unique Deus Vult | Russia Local Qualifiers |
| (Singapore) EVOS Esports SG | MPL-MY/SG S6 Runner-Up |
| (Singapore) RSG SG | MPL-MY/SG S6 Second Runner-Up |

=== M3 World Championship (2021) ===
| Team | Seed |
|---|---|
| (Singapore) EVOS Esports SG | MPL-SG S2 Champion |
| (Singapore) RSG SG | MPL-SG S2 Runner-up |
| (Indonesia) ONIC Esports | MPL-ID S8 Champion |
| (Indonesia) RRQ Hoshi | MPL-ID S8 Runner-up |
| (Philippines) Blacklist International | MPL-PH S8 Champion |
| ONIC Philippines | MPL-PH S8 Runner-up |
| (Malaysia) Team SMG | MPL-MY S8 Champion |
| (Malaysia) Todak | MPL-MY S8 Runner-up |
| (Brazil) Red Canids | MPL-BR S1 Champion |
| (Brazil) Vivo Keyd | MPL-BR S1 Runner-up |
| (Cambodia) See You Soon | MPL-KH S1 Champion |
| (United States) BloodThirstyKings | M3 North American Qualifier Champion |
| GX Squad | M3 Arabia Major 2nd Runner Up (Replaced Akatsuki) |
| (Commonwealth of Independent States) Natus Vincere | Mobile Legends Mythic League CIS Champion |
| (Turkey) Bedel | Mobile Legends Turkey Championship 2021 Champion |
| (Peru) Malvinas Gaming | LATAM Championship 2021 Champion |

=== M4 World Championship (2022) ===
| Team | Seed |
|---|---|
| (Malaysia) Team HAQ | MPL Malaysia S10 Champion |
| (Malaysia) Todak | MPL Malaysia S10 Runner-up |
| (Cambodia) Burn X Flash | MPL KH Autumn Split 2022 Champion |
| RSG Singapore | MPL Singapore S4 |
| (Turkey) Incendio Supremacy | Turkey Champion |
| (Philippines) Blacklist International | MPL Philippines Season 10 Champion |
| ECHO Philippines | MPL Philippines Season 10 Runner Up |
| (Indonesia) ONIC Esports | MPL Indonesia Season 10 Champion |
| (Indonesia) RRQ Hoshi | MPL Indonesia Season 10 Runner-Up |
| (Brazil) RRQ Akira | MPL Brazil Season 3 Champion |
| (Myanmar) Falcon Esports | Myanmar M4 Qualifiers |
| S11 Gaming Argentina | Super League LATAM Champion |
| (Peru) Malvinas Gaming | Super League LATAM Runner-up |
| (Vietnam) MDH Esports | M4 Mekong Qualifiers |
| (Egypt) Occupy Thrones | MPL MENA Fall Split 2022 Champions (previously Thrones Esport) |
| (United States) The Valley | MLBB NACT Winner |

=== M5 World Championship (2023) ===
Group Stage Teams
| Team | Finish |
|---|---|
| AP Bren | MPL Philippines S12 Champions |
| Blacklist International | MPL Philippines S12 Runner-Up |
| ONIC Esports | MPL Indonesia S12 Champions |
| Geek Fam ID | MPL Indonesia S12 Runner-Up |
| HomeBois | MPL Malaysia S12 Champions |
| Team Flash | MPL Singapore S6 Champions |
| RRQ Akira | LIGA LATAM 2023 Champions |
| Bigetron Sons | LIGA LATAM 2023 Runner-Up |
| See You Soon | MPL Cambodia Autumn Split Champions 2023 |
| Triple Esports | MPL MENA Fall Split Champions 2023 |
| Deus Vult | MCC Season 2 Champions |
| Fire Flux Esports | MTC Turkiye Championship Season 2 |
| TheOhioBrothers | NACT Fall Split Champions 2023 |
| Burmese Ghouls | Myanmar M5 Qualifier |

Wild Card Teams
| Team | Finish |
|---|---|
| Imperio | LIGA LATAM 2023 2nd Runner-Up |
| Team SMG | MPL Malaysia S12 Runner-Up (Qualified) |
| Umbrella Squad | MCC Season 2 Runner-Up |
| 4Merical Esports | MLBB Champion Battles Fall 2023 |
| Niightmare Esports | M Challenge Cup Mekong Season 2 |
| Team Falcons | MPL MENA Fall Split Runner-Up 2023 |
| Team Lilgun | ESN National Championship Champions 2023 (Qualified) |
| Keep Best Gaming | MLBB M5 China Qualifier |

=== M6 World Championship (2024) ===
Group Stage Teams
| Team | Finish |
|---|---|
| Fnatic ONIC Philippines | MPL Philippines S14 Champions |
| Aurora Gaming | MPL Philippines S14 Runner-Up |
| Team Liquid Indonesia | MPL Indonesia S14 Champions |
| RRQ Hoshi | MPL Indonesia S14 Runner-Up |
| Selangor Red Giants | MPL Malaysia S14 Champions |
| Team Vamos | MPL Singapore S14 Champions |
| NIP Flash | MPL Singapore S8 Champions |
| CFU Gaming | MPL Cambodia S7 Champions |
| Team Spirit | MLBB Continental Championships S4 Champions |
| S2G Esports | MTC Turkiye Championship S4 Champions |
| Twisted Minds | MPL MENA S6 Champions |
| KeepBest Gaming | MLBB M6 China Qualifier Champions |
| Falcon Esports | MLBB M6 Myanmar Qualifier Champions |
| Maycam Evolve | MPL LATAM S2 Champions |
| BloodthirstyKings | NACT Fall 2024 Champions |

Wild Card Teams
| Team | Finish |
|---|---|
| Legion Esports | M Challenge Cup Mekong S4 Champions |
| Niightmare Esports | M Challenge Cup Mekong S4 Runner-Up |
| Insilio | MLBB Continental Championships S4 Runner-Up |
| ULFHEDNAR | M Turkiye Championship S4 Runner-Up |
| RRQ Akira | MPL LATAM S2 Runner-Up |
| Geekay Esports | MPL MENA S6 Runner-Up |
| The MongolZ | ESN National Championship Champions 2024 |
| DFYG | MLBB M6 China Qualifier Runner-Up |

=== M7 World Championship (2025–2026) ===
Group Stage Teams
| Team | Finish |
|---|---|
| Team Liquid PH | MPL Philippines S16 Champions |
| Aurora Gaming PH | MPL Philippines S16 Runner-Up |
| ONIC Esports | MPL Indonesia S16 Champions |
| Alter Ego Esports | MPL Indonesia S16 Runner-Up |
| Selangor Red Giants | MPL Malaysia S16 Champions |
| CG Esports | MPL Malaysia S16 Runner-Up |
| Evil | MPL Singapore S10 Champions |
| CFU Gaming | MPL Cambodia S9 Champions |
| Team Spirit | MLBB Continental Championships S6 Champions |
| Aurora Gaming | MTC Turkiye Championship S6 Champions |
| Team Falcons | MPL MENA S8 Champions |
| DianFengYaoGuai | MLBB China Masters Champions |
| Yangon Galacticos | MLBB Super League S2 Champions |
| Black Sentence Esports | MPL LATAM S4 Champions |

Wild Card Teams
| Team | Finish |
|---|---|
| RLG SE | VMC 2025 Winter Champions |
| Leon Esports | M Challenge Cup Mekong S6 Champions |
| Virtus.pro | MLBB Continental Championships S6 Runner-Up |
| Boostgate Esports | M Turkiye Championship S6 Runner-Up |
| ZETA Division | M7 Japan Qualifiers Champions |
| Axe | MPL MENA S6 Runner-Up |
| Team Zone | ESN National Championship Champions 2025 |
| Guangzhou Gaming | MLBB China Masters Runner-Up |

== Results ==
=== Grand Final winners ===
† The team/organization has disbanded.
‡ The entire team/organization has transferred to another game.

| Year | Edition | Host(s) | Champions | | Results | | First runner up | | Second runner up | Third runner up | Finals MVP | No. of Teams |
| Year | Edition | Host(s) | Region | Team | Results | | Team | Region | Second runner up | Third runner up | Finals MVP | No. of Teams |
|---|---|---|---|---|---|---|---|---|---|---|---|---|
| 2019 | M1 | Kuala Lumpur | Indonesia | EVOS Legends | 4 | 3 | RRQ Hoshi | Indonesia | TODAK | Burmese Ghouls | Eko "Oura" Julianto | 16 |
| 2020 | M2 | Singapore | Philippines | Bren Esports | 4 | 3 | Burmese Ghouls | Myanmar | RRQ Hoshi | Alter Ego Esports | Karl "KarlTzy" Nepomuceno | 12 |
| 2021 | M3 | Singapore | Philippines | Blacklist International † | 4 | 0 | ONIC Philippines | Philippines | BloodThirstyKings ‡ | EVOS Singapore † | Kiel "Oheb" Soriano | 16 |
| 2022 | M4 | Jakarta | Philippines | ECHO Philippines | 4 | 0 | Blacklist International | Philippines | RRQ Hoshi | ONIC Esports | Federic "Bennyqt" Gonzales | 16 |
| 2023 | M5 | Manila | Philippines | AP Bren | 4 | 3 | ONIC Esports | Indonesia | Blacklist International † | Deus Vult † | David "FlapTzy" Canon | 22 |
| 2024 | M6 | Kuala Lumpur | Philippines | Fnatic ONIC Philippines | 4 | 1 | Team Liquid ID | Indonesia | Selangor Red Giants | Team Spirit | Grant Duane "Kelra" Pillas | 23 |
| 2026 | M7 | Jakarta | Philippines | Aurora Gaming | 4 | 0 | Alter Ego Esports | Indonesia | Selangor Red Giants | Team Liquid PH | Dylan Aaron "Light" Catipon | 22 |
| 2027 | M8 | Istanbul | To be determined | | | | | | To be determined | | To be determined | TBD |

=== Regional and Team Performances ===
MLBB World Championship team nations best result. Champions Runner-up Third Place Fourth Place 5th to 6th 7th to 8th Group Stage or Swiss Stage Wildcard

| Region and League | Titles | Runner-Up | 2nd Runner-Up | 3rd Runner-Up | Top Four Finishes |
|---|---|---|---|---|---|
| Philippines (MPL Philippines) | 6 (M2–M7) | 2 (M3, M4) | 1 (M5) | 1 (M7) | 10 |
| Indonesia (MPL Indonesia) | 1 (M1) | 4 (M1, M5–M7) | 2 (M2, M4) | 2 (M2, M4) | 9 |
| Malaysia (MPL Malaysia) | 0 | 0 | 3 (M1, M6, M7) | 0 | 3 |
| Myanmar (MPL Myanmar) | 0 | 1 (M2) | 0 | 1 (M1) | 2 |
| Commonwealth of Independent States (MCC) | 0 | 0 | 0 | 2 (M5, M6) | 2 |
| United States (NACT) | 0 | 0 | 1 (M3) | 0 | 1 |
| Singapore (MPL Singapore) | 0 | 0 | 0 | 1 (M3) | 1 |

The M1, M3 and M4 editions of the world championships witnessed an all Philippine or Indonesian Grand Finals, thus having two editions in either of the four final positions. M2, M5, and now M6 are from the three of the iterations of the world championship that does not see a forseable Philippines vs. Philippines Grand Finals.

==== By Team ====
† Team has disbanded

| Region and league | Finals appearance(s) | Titles | Runner-Up | 2nd Runner-Up | 3rd Runner-Up |
|---|---|---|---|---|---|
| AP Bren | 2 | 2 (M2, M5) | 0 | 0 | 0 |
| Aurora Gaming | 1 | 1 (M7) | 0 | 0 | 0 |
| Blacklist International † | 2 | 1 (M3) | 1 (M4) | 1 (M5) | 0 |
| ONIC PH | 2 | 1 (M6) | 1 (M3) | 0 | 0 |
| EVOS Legends | 1 | 1 (M1) | 0 | 0 | 0 |
| Team Liquid PH | 1 | 1 (M4) | 0 | 0 | 1 (M7) |
| Team Liquid ID | 1 | 0 | 1 (M6) | 0 | 0 |
| RRQ Hoshi | 1 | 0 | 1 (M1) | 2 (M2, M4) | 0 |
| Burmese Ghouls | 1 | 0 | 1 (M2) | 0 | 1 (M1) |
| ONIC ID | 1 | 0 | 1 (M5) | 0 | 1 (M4) |
| Alter Ego Esports | 1 | 0 | 1 (M7) | 0 | 1 (M2) |
| Selangor Red Giants | 0 | 0 | 0 | 2 (M6, M7) | 0 |
| TODAK | 0 | 0 | 0 | 1 (M1) | 0 |
| BloodThirstyKings † | 0 | 0 | 0 | 1 (M3) | 0 |
| Team Spirit | 0 | 0 | 0 | 0 | 1 (M6) |
| EVOS Singapore † | 0 | 0 | 0 | 0 | 1 (M3) |
| / Deus Vult † | 0 | 0 | 0 | 0 | 1 (M5) |

== The Golden Road ==
Selangor Red Giants OG Esports
| Team Placement | 1st | 1st | 1st | 3rd | Team Placement |
| Competition | Split 1 | MSC | Split 2 | Worlds | Competition |
| Champions | SRG | SRG | SRG | FNOP | Champions |
ONIC Esports
| Team Placement | 1st | 1st | 1st | 2nd | Team Placement |
| Competition | Split 1 | MSC | Split 2 | Worlds | Competition |
| Champions | ONIC | ONIC | ONIC | APBR | Champions |
Blacklist International
| Team Placement | 1st | 2nd | 1st | 1st | Team Placement |
| Competition | Split 1 | MSC | Split 2 | Worlds | Competition |
| Champions | BLCK | EXE | BLCK | BLCK | Champions |
Team Liquid PH
| Team Placement | 1st | 1st | 1st | 4th | Team Placement |
| Competition | Split 1 | MSC | Split 2 | Worlds | Competition |
| Champions | TLPH | TLPH | TLPH | RORA | Champions |

The "Golden Road" is a term used in Mobile Legends: Bang Bang esports to describe the achievement of a single team winning all major titles within a competitive season. This includes victories in both domestic league splits, the Mobile Legends: Bang Bang Mid Season Cup (MSC), and the Mobile Legends: Bang Bang World Championship (M-Series). The expression is analogous to the concept of the Golden Road in League of Legends, where it denotes a team's complete sweep of domestic and international tournaments within the same year. The term is commonly employed by esports commentators and analysts to highlight a team's pursuit of a perfect competitive season. It is similar to a grand slam in tennis or in Counter-Strike.

Since the game's release in 2017, only a limited number of teams in Mobile Legends: Bang Bang have had the opportunity to pursue the Golden Road. However, no team has successfully achieved the feat to date, with most being eliminated during either the Mid Season Cup (MSC) or the World Championship (M-Series) stages.

=== List of teams that have attempted to pursue the Golden Road ===
Teams whose campaign ended in the World Championship

- ONIC Esports - 2023
  - ONIC Esports, one of Indonesia's most dominant Mobile Legends: Bang Bang teams, came within a single tournament of completing the Golden Road in 2023. Entering the year as the reigning MPL Indonesia champions, ONIC successfully defended their title in Season 11, defeating long-time rivals EVOS Legends in the Grand Finals to secure back-to-back championships. Their domestic dominance established them as strong contenders heading into the Mobile Legends: Bang Bang Southeast Asia Cup 2023 (MSC 2023). During MSC 2023, ONIC Esports delivered a commanding performance, posting a 10–2 record throughout the knockout stage. The team swept EVOS Legends in the opening round and decisively defeated ECHO Philippines, the defending M4 World Champions, in the semifinals. This victory marked Indonesia's return to the MSC Grand Finals for the second consecutive year, where ONIC faced Blacklist International, the M3 World Champions. ONIC prevailed 4–2 in the series, earning Indonesia's first major international title since 2019, when the organization also claimed the MSC championship in the Philippines. Following their MSC triumph, ONIC Esports captured a third consecutive MPL Indonesia title, completing a domestic three-peat and entering the M5 World Championship in Manila as overwhelming favorites. Despite an exceptional run, the team fell just one match short of achieving the Golden Road, losing a hard-fought seven-game Grand Final to AP Bren. ONIC's 2023 campaign is widely regarded as the closest any team has come to completing the Golden Road in Mobile Legends: Bang Bang history
- Selangor Red Giants Esports - 2024
  - Selangor Red Giants Esports came within one tournament of completing the Golden Road during the 2024 Mobile Legends: Bang Bang competitive season. The Malaysian organization captured its first-ever domestic championship at MPL Malaysia Season 13 (MPL MY S13), securing direct qualification to the Mobile Legends: Bang Bang Mid Season Cup 2024 (MSC 2024) group stage. At MSC 2024, Selangor Red Giants achieved a series of milestone victories in the Knockout Stage, defeating Fire Flux Esports of Turkey in a best-of-five series and sweeping NIP Flash of Singapore in the semifinals. These victories earned the team the distinction of being the first Malaysian squad to reach the grand finals of an international Mobile Legends tournament. In the championship series, Selangor Red Giants triumphed over Falcons AP Bren, the defending M5 World Champions, in a best-of-seven series to claim Malaysia's first international title in any Moonton-sanctioned global competition. Following their international success, the team captured a second consecutive domestic title, becoming back-to-back Malaysian champions. Entering the M6 World Championship, Selangor Red Giants were widely regarded as tournament favorites. However, after an early fall to the lower bracket, the team's campaign concluded in the lower bracket finals, where they were swept by Team Liquid Indonesia. This loss ultimately ended the organization's pursuit of the Golden Road.
- Team Liquid PH - 2025–26
  - Team Liquid Philippines (TLPH) entered 2025 as the defending MPL Philippines champions after defeating the reigning M6 World Champions, Fnatic ONIC Philippines, in a tightly contested seven-game Grand Final during Season 15. The victory marked the organization's first domestic title under the Team Liquid banner and established TLPH as one of the strongest teams in the region. At the Mobile Legends: Bang Bang Mid Season Cup 2025 (MSC 2025), Team Liquid Philippines emerged as one of the tournament favorites. The team sought redemption after their early elimination at MSC 2024, where they were defeated by Falcons AP Bren. Demonstrating significant growth, TLPH advanced through the knockout stage and secured a pivotal victory over ONIC Esports, the Indonesian champions, in the semifinals. In the Grand Finals, Team Liquid Philippines faced Selangor Red Giants OG Esports, the defending MSC champions. After dropping the opening game, TLPH rallied to win four consecutive matches, clinching the series 4–1 and reclaiming the MSC title for the Philippines for the first time in three years. In the domestic campaign, Team Liquid PH becomes the first organization since Blacklist International to go back-to-back in MPL Philippines, making them the third organization overall to achieve such a feat. Team Liquid PH becomes the third team whose Golden Road campaign ended in the M-series when they lost in a 5-game series to Alter Ego in the lower bracket semifinals.

Teams whose campaigns ended in the Mid Season Cup

- Blacklist International - 2022
  - Blacklist International came close to completing the Golden Road during the 2021 Mobile Legends: Bang Bang competitive season. The Filipino powerhouse established itself as one of the most dominant teams in the region, beginning its historic run by winning the MPL Philippines Season 7 (MPL PH S7) championship with a 4–3 victory over Execration in a tightly contested Grand Finals. The win marked the organization's first domestic title and solidified its reputation as one of the premier teams in the Philippines especially after the team won the title after going down in a 1–3 deficit. Following their MPL triumph, Blacklist International represented the Philippines at the Mobile Legends: Bang Bang Southeast Asia Cup 2021 (MSC 2021), where they reached the Grand Finals but fell 1–4 to Execration, finishing as runners-up and nullifying their golden road run. Despite the loss, the team maintained its form heading into the next domestic season alongside adding veteran flex player Salic "Hadji" Imam. Blacklist International went on to defend its title at MPL Philippines Season 8 (MPL PH S8), defeating ONIC Philippines 4–1 in the Grand Finals to become back-to-back domestic champions. The team's success continued on the international stage at the M3 World Championship, where they once again faced ONIC Philippines in the Grand Finals. This time, Blacklist International swept the series 4–0, capturing the M3 World Championship and cementing themselves as one of the most successful Mobile Legends: Bang Bang teams in history.
