= List of Mobile Legends: Bang Bang Mid Season Cup participants =

The Mobile Legends: Bang Bang Mid Season Cup, commonly known as MSC, is an international Mobile Legends: Bang Bang tournament organised by the Moonton, the developer of the game. The tournament was previously contested as the Mobile Legends: Bang Bang Southeast Asia Cup from 2017 until 2023. It was not held in 2020 due to COVID-19 pandemic. Since 2024, following the name rebrand and change in format, MSC would be part of Esports World Cup held in Riyadh, Saudi Arabia, colloquially known as MSC x EWC.

The current format, in use since the tournament was rebranded ahead of the 2024 edition, features 23 teams divided into two stages; group stage with 15 teams and wildcard stage with 8 teams, whereas the winner of wildcard stage would be qualified to group stage, making it 16 teams competing in the main event. In the group stage, the teams are drawn into four groups of four, with each team playing three group stage matches in a round-robin best-of-two (BO2) format. The top two teams from each group advance to the playoffs stage, starting with the quarterfinals and then semifinals in best-of-five (BO5) format, culminating with the grand final in best-of-seven (BO7) format.

For the upcoming 2025 edition, the teams distribution as follows: split into the group stage and the wildcard stage, with up to two teams from each nation or region. For the group stage, 2 teams each from Indonesia, Malaysia, and Philippines, and 1 team each from Cambodia, China, Myanmar, Turkey, Singapore, CIS, Latin America, MENA, and North America, and for the wildcard stage, 1 team each from China, Japan, Mongolia, Vietnam, CIS, Latin America, MENA, and the rest of Southeast Asia (Brunei Darussalam, Laos, Thailand, Timor-Leste, or Vietnam—meaning Vietnam could have two teams in total).

== Participants by debut year ==
As of 2025 edition, there are total of 72 different teams competed in MSC with total of 112 slots allocation. Each successive MSC has had at least two teams appearing again from past edition and four teams appearing for the first time.

Year	Debuting team(s)	Total	Cum.
2017	(Indonesia) Elite8 Esports, (Indonesia) Saints Indo, (Malaysia) AirAsia Saiyan (Note: AirAsia Saiyan debuted as Team Saiyan in MSC 2017.), (Malaysia) MyA Junior, (Philippines) Salty Salad, (Philippines) Solid Gaming Alpha, (Singapore) Impunity, (Thailand) IDNS	8/8	8/8
2018	(Indonesia) Aerowolf Roxy, (Indonesia) EVOS Esports, (Indonesia) RRQ Hoshi (Note: RRQ Hoshi debuted as RRQ O2 in MSC 2018.), (Myanmar) Burmese Ghouls, (Philippines) AP Bren (Note: AP Bren debuted as Aether Main in MSC 2018.), (Philippines) Digital Devils Pro, Bigetron Singapore, (Vietnam) VEC Fantasy Main (Note: VEC Fantasy Main debuted as Fantasy Main in MSC 2018.)	8/10	16/18
2019	(Cambodia) Diversity Helheim, (Indonesia) Louvre Esports, (Indonesia) ONIC Esports, (Laos) WAWA Gaming, (Malaysia) Geek Fam, (Myanmar) Team Resolution, (Philippines) ArkAngel, (Singapore) EVOS SG, (Vietnam) Overclockers	9/12	25/30
2021	(Cambodia) Impunity KH, (Indonesia) Bigetron Esports (Note: Bigetron Esports debuted as Bigetron Alpha in MSC 2021.), (Laos) Niightmare Esports, RSG Malaysia, Todak, (Philippines) Blacklist International, (Philippines) Omega Esports (Note: Omega Esports debuted as Execration in MSC 2021.), RSG Singapore, (Vietnam) Cyber EXE	9/12	34/42
2022	(Cambodia) See You Soon, (Malaysia) Orange Esports, (Myanmar) Falcon Esports, RSG Philippines	4/12	38/54
2023	(Cambodia) Team Flash KH (Note: Team Flash KH debuted as BURN x Flash in MSC 2023.), (Egypt) Team Occupy, (Laos) Team EVO, (Philippines) Team Liquid PH (Note: Team Liquid PH debuted as ECHO Philippines in MSC 2023.), (Turkey) Fire Flux Esports (Note: Fire Flux Esports debuted as Fire Flux Impunity in MSC 2023.), (United States) Outplay	6/12	44/66
2024	(Brazil) RRQ Akira, (China) KeepBest Gaming, (China) DianFengYaoGuai (Note: DianFengYaoGuai debuted as Xianyou Gaming in MSC 2024.), (Malaysia) HomeBois, (Malaysia) SRG.OG (Note: SRG.OG debuted as Selangor Red Giants in MSC 2024.), (Mongolia) IHC Esports, (Nepal) Trained to Kill, (Peru) Entity7, (Russia) Brute Force, (Russia) Team Spirit, (Saudi Arabia) Team Falcons, (Saudi Arabia) Twisted Minds, (Singapore) Team Flash (Note: Team Flash debuted as NIP Flash in MSC 2024.), (Turkey) S2G Esports, (United States) Cloud9, (Vietnam) Legion Esports (Note: Legion Esports debuted as Zino Zenith in MSC 2024.)	16/23	60/89
2025	(Argentina) Influence Rage, (Brazil) Corinthians, (Cambodia) CFU Gaming, (China) Rare Atom, (Egypt) Ultra Legends, (Japan) Zeta Division, (Mongolia) The MongolZ, (Myanmar) Mythic SEAL, ONIC Philippines, (Russia) Virtus.pro, (Turkey) Aurora Türkiye, (United States) Area 77	12/23	72/112
2026	PRO Esports, Guangzhou Gaming, True Rippers, Sunset Ravens, Geekay Esports, Team Vamos, The Huns Esports, Yangon Galacticos, Team Falcons PH, VSG, IGNITE Gaming, King of Gamers Club, FUT Esports, Alpha7 North	14/25* (Note: Verso Time was supposed to be a debutant team but due to their forfeiture, they do not count.)	86/137

== Participants by edition ==
=== MSC 2017 ===
Five-Nations Finals				Ref.
Team	Seed	Team	Seed	Ref.
(Indonesia) Saints Indo	MSC 2017 Indonesia Winner	(Philippines) Solid Gaming Alpha	MSC 2017 Philippines Winner	
(Indonesia) Elite8 Esports	MSC 2017 Indonesia Runner-up	(Philippines) Salty Salad	MSC 2017 Philippines Runner-up	
(Malaysia) Team Saiyan	MSC 2017 Malaysia Winner	(Singapore) Impunity	MSC 2017 Singapore Winner	
(Malaysia) MyA Junior	MSC 2017 Malaysia Runner-up	(Thailand) IDNS	MSC 2017 Thailand Winner	

=== MSC 2018 ===
Group A		Group B		Ref.
Team	Seed	Team	Seed	Ref.
(Indonesia) Aerowolf Roxy	MPL ID S1 Winner	(Philippines) Aether Main	MPL PH S1 Winner	
Bigetron Singapore	MPL MY/SG S1 Winner	(Indonesia) EVOS Esports	MPL ID S1 Runner-up	
(Philippines) Digital Devils Pro	MPL PH S1 Runner-up	(Indonesia) RRQ.O2	MPL ID S1 3rd Place	
(Malaysia) AirAsia Saiyan	MPL MY/SG S1 4th Place	(Thailand) IDNS	Thailand Qualifier Winner	
(Myanmar) Burmese Ghouls	Myanmar Qualifier Winner	(Vietnam) Fantasy Main	Vietnam Qualifier Winner	

=== MSC 2019 ===
Group A		Group B		Ref.
Team	Seed	Team	Seed	Ref.
(Malaysia) Geek Fam	MPL MY/SG S3 Winner	(Philippines) ArkAngel	MPL PH S3 Winner	
(Philippines) Bren Esports	MPL PH S3 Runner-up	(Singapore) EVOS SG	MPL MY/SG S3 Runner-up	
(Thailand) IDNS	Thailand Qualifier Winner	(Vietnam) Overclockers	Vietnam Qualifier Winner	
Group C		Group D		
Team	Seed	Team	Seed	
(Myanmar) Team Resolution	MPL MM S2 Winner	(Indonesia) ONIC Esports	MPL ID S3 Winner	
(Indonesia) Louvre Esports	MPL ID S3 Runner-up	(Myanmar) Burmese Ghouls	MPL MM S2 Runner-up	
(Cambodia) Diversity Helheim	Cambodia Qualifier Winner	(Laos) WAWA Gaming	Laos Qualifier Winner	

=== MSC 2021 ===
Group A		Group B		Ref.
Team	Seed	Team	Seed	Ref.
RSG Malaysia	MPL MY S7 Winner	(Indonesia) EVOS Legends	MPL ID S7 Winner	
RSG Singapore	MPL SG S1 Runner-up	(Malaysia) TODAK	MPL MY S7 Runner-up	
(Thailand) IDNS	Thailand Direct Invitee	(Vietnam) Cyber EXE	Vietnam Direct Invitee	
Group C		Group D		
Team	Seed	Team	Seed	
(Philippines) Blacklist International	MPL PH S7 Winner	(Singapore) EVOS SG	MPL SG S1 Winner	
(Indonesia) Bigetron Alpha	MPL ID S7 Runner-up	(Philippines) Execration	MPL PH S7 Runner-up	
(Cambodia) Impunity KH	Cambodia Direct Invitee	(Laos) Niightmare Esports	Laos Direct Invitee	

=== MSC 2022 ===
Group A		Group B		Ref.
Team	Seed	Team	Seed	Ref.
(Malaysia) TODAK	MPL MY S9 Winner	RSG Philippines	MPL PH S9 Winner	
(Indonesia) ONIC Esports	MPL ID S9 Runner-up	RSG Singapore	MPL SG S3 Winner	
(Myanmar) Falcon Esports	Myanmar Qualifier Winner	(Cambodia) See You Soon	MPL KH Spring 2022 Runner-up	
Group C		Group D		
Team	Seed	Team	Seed	
(Indonesia) RRQ Hoshi	MPL ID S9 Winner	(Cambodia) Impunity KH	MPL KH Spring 2022 Winner	
(Philippines) Omega Esports	MPL PH S9 Runner-up	(Malaysia) Orange Esports	MPL MY S9 Runner-up	
(Thailand) IDNS	Mekong Qualifier (Note: Mekong Qualifier in MSC 2022 is for teams from Laos, Thailand, and Vietnam.) Winner	(Singapore) EVOS SG	MPL SG S3 Runner-up	

=== MSC 2023 ===
Group A		Group B		Ref.
Team	Seed	Team	Seed	Ref.
ECHO Philippines	MPL PH S11 Winner	RSG Slate Singapore	MPL SG S5 Winner	
(Turkey) Fire Flux Impunity	MTC S1 Winner	EVOS Legends	MPL ID S11 Runner-up	
(Laos) Team EVO	Mekong Qualifier (Note: Mekong Qualifier in MSC 2023 is for teams from Brunei Darussalam, Laos, Thailand, and Vietnam.) Winner	(Myanmar) Fenix Esports	Myanmar Qualifier Winner	
Group C		Group D		
Team	Seed	Team	Seed	
(Indonesia) ONIC Esports	MPL ID S11 Winner	(Egypt) Team Occupy	MPL MENA Spring 2023 Winner	
(Cambodia) BURN x Flash	MPL KH Spring 2023 Winner	(Malaysia) TODAK	MPL MY S11 Winner	
(United States) Outplay (Note: For documentary purpose only, according to their base of operations, teams from North America region: Outplay, Cloud9, and Area 77, will all represent United States.) (Note: NACT Spring 2023 Winner BloodThirstyKing was unable to participate due to failing to meet the tournament's minimum roster requirements, after two of their players were unavailable for personal reasons. NACT Spring 2023 Runner-up Outplay was selected to replace their slot by the tournament committee.)	NACT Spring 2023 Runner-up	(Philippines) Blacklist International	MPL PH S11 Runner-up	

=== MSC 2024 ===
Group Stage				Ref.
Group A		Group B		Ref.
Team	Seed	Team	Seed	Ref.
(Brazil) RRQ Akira	MPL LATAM S1 Winner	(Indonesia) Fnatic ONIC	MPL ID S13 Winner	
(Singapore) NIP Flash	MPL SG S7 Winner	(Cambodia) See You Soon	MPL KH S6 Winner	
(Turkey) Fire Flux Esports	MTC S3 Winner	(Saudi Arabia) Team Falcons	MPL MENA S5 Winner	
(Indonesia) EVOS Glory	MPL ID S13 Runner-up	(Malaysia) Selangor Red Giants	MPL MY S13 Winner	
Group C		Group D		
Team	Seed	Team	Seed	
(Russia) Team Spirit (Note: For documentary purpose only, according to their majority of players, teams from CIS region: Brute Force based in Saudi Arabia, Team Spirit based in Serbia, and Virtus.pro based in Armenia, will all represent Russia.)	MCC S3 Winner	(United States) Cloud9	NACT Spring 2024 Winner	
(Philippines) Liquid ECHO	MPL PH S13 Winner	(Philippines) Falcons AP Bren	MPL PH S13 Runner-up	
(Saudi Arabia) Twisted Minds	MPL MENA S5 Runner-up	(China) Xianyou Gaming	China Qualifier Winner	
(Malaysia) HomeBois	Wildcard Stage Winner	(Myanmar) Falcon Esports	Myanmar Qualifier Winner	
Wildcard Stage				
Group A		Group B		
Team	Seed	Team	Seed	
(Vietnam) Zino Zenith	MCCM S3 Winner	(Nepal) Trained to Kill	MCB S3 Winner	
(Peru) Entity7	MPL LATAM S1 Runner-up	(Russia) Brute Force	MCC S3 Runner-up	
(Turkey) S2G Esports	MTC S3 Runner-up	(Malaysia) HomeBois	MPL MY S13 Runner-up	
(China) KeepBest Gaming	China Qualifier Runner-up	(Mongolia) IHC Esports	Mongolia Qualifier Winner	

=== MSC 2025 ===
Group Stage				Ref.
Group A		Group B		Ref.
Team	Seed	Team	Seed	Ref.
(Indonesia) ONIC Esports	MPL ID S15 Winner	(Russia) Team Spirit	MCC S5 Winner	
(Cambodia) CFU Gaming	MPL KH S8 Winner	(Turkey) Aurora Türkiye	MTC S5 Winner	
(Brazil) Corinthians	MPL LATAM S3 Winner	(Singapore) Team Flash	MPL SG S9 Winner	
(Egypt) Ultra Legends	MPL MENA S7 Winner	(United States) Area 77 (Note: NACT Spring 2025 Winner BloodThirstyKing then signed by Indian esports organization S8UL Esports, was unable to participate due to failing to meet the tournament's minimum roster requirements after two of their players were disqualified for breaching official tournament rules. NACT Spring 2025 Runner-up Area 77 was selected to replace their slot by the tournament committee.)	NACT Spring 2025 Runner-up	
(Malaysia) SRG.OG	MPL MY S15 Winner	(Indonesia) RRQ Hoshi	MPL ID S15 Runner-up	
(Philippines) Team Liquid PH	MPL PH S15 Winner	(Malaysia) HomeBois	MPL MY S15 Runner-up	
(Myanmar) Mythic SEAL	MSL MM S1 Winner	ONIC Philippines	MPL PH S15 Runner-up	
(Russia) Virtus.pro	Wildcard Stage Winner	(China) DianFengYaoGuai	China Qualifier Winner	
Wildcard Stage				
Group A		Group B		
Team	Seed	Team	Seed	
(Vietnam) Legion Esports	VMC Spring 2025 Winner	(Laos) Niightmare Esports	MCCM S5 Winner	
(Saudi Arabia) Team Falcons	MPL MENA S7 Runner-up	(Russia) Virtus.pro	MCC S5 Runner-up	
(Mongolia) The MongolZ	Mongolia Qualifier Winner	(Argentina) Influence Rage	MPL LATAM S3 Runner-up	
(China) Rare Atom	China Qualifier Runner-up	(Japan) Zeta Division	Japan Qualifier Winner	
