= Kiboy =

Indonesian professional esports player (born 2002)

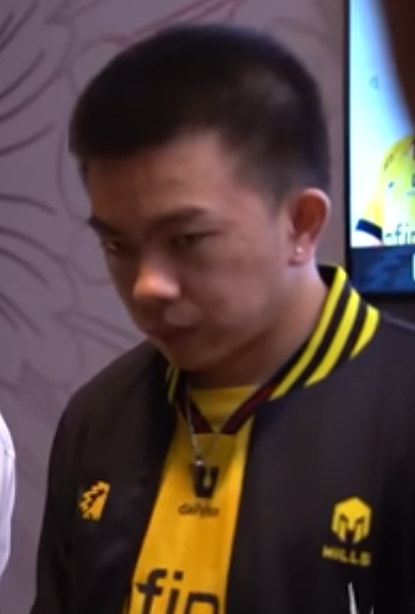
- Kiboy in 2023

Personal information
- Born: Nicky Fernando Pontonuwu; 7 November 2002 (age 24); Manado, Indonesia
- Nationality: Indonesian

Current team
- Team: ONIC Esports
- Role: Roamer
- Game: Mobile Legends: Bang Bang
- League: MPL Indonesia

Career information
- Playing career: 2020–present

Team history
- 2020: ONIC Esports
- 2020–2021: ONIC Prodigy
- 2021–present: ONIC Esports

Career highlights and awards
- MPL Indonesia Season 8 (1st place); ONE Esports MPL Invitational 2021 (1st place); MPL Indonesia Season 10 (1st place); MLBB M4 World Championship (4th place); MPL Indonesia Season 11 (1st place); MSC 2023 (1st place); MSC 2023 (MVP); Snapdragon Pro Series Season 3 SEA - Challenge Finals (1st place); MPL Indonesia Season 12 (1st place); MPL Indonesia Season 12 (Finals MVP); MLBB M5 World Championship (2nd place); MPL Indonesia Season 13 (1st place); Dream Team of the Season 13; MPL Indonesia Season 15 (1st place); MPL Indonesia Season 16 (1st place); Dream Team of the Season 16; In short, Kiboy has earned the following titles: kiboy has won seven mpl titles (tujuh wak); fourth place m4 world championship; runner up m5 world championship; MSC 2023 (1st place), and Kiboy becomes MVP finalist for Onic; Snapdragon Pro Series Season 3 SEA Challenge Finals (1st place); MPL Id MVP finalist Season 12

Nicky Fernando (born 7 November 2002), known as Kiboy, is an Indonesian professional esports player for the game Mobile Legends: Bang Bang. He is the current roamer for Indonesian team ONIC Esports.

== Background ==
Kiboy's love of mobile games started when he was a teenager. His interest in MLBB grew when he was in high school. Armed with a dream of becoming pro player, he continues to hone his skills and participates in various tournaments.

== Career ==
=== Early Stage ===
In 2020, ONIC Esports signed Nicky for their fifth MPL Indonesia season. However, he had to compete with experienced players like Psychoo and other quality newcomers like Rasy to compete for a spot as the main roamer. Instead of forcing himself to compete with them, he moved down to MDL Indonesia, a second league after MPL. In MDL Season 1, he helped ONIC Prodigy (ONIC academy team) finishing 5–8th place, losing to Siren Clan. In the second season, they finished 3–4th place, also losing to Siren Clan in which he was also awarded the First Team Winner.

=== Promotion to the first team ===
After his exceptional performance in MDL, he was called up to the main team for MPLI 2020 but fell short of their sister team, ONIC Philippines. In MPL Indonesia Season 7, he became the main roster of ONIC and helped them finish 4th place. The following season, Kiboy helped ONIC lift the trophy for the first time since season 3 and qualified for MLBB M3 World Championship.

=== MLBB M3 World Championship ===
In the MLBB M3 World Championship, ONIC did not perform well in the group stage by finishing last after they won against their Filipino counterpart, ONIC Philippines, and lost to the Brazilian, Keyd Stars, and Malaysian representative, TODAK. In the knockout stage, ONIC managed to gain an upper hand against the Malaysian champion, Team SMG but ended their journey after losing to Blacklist International, finishing 9–12th place.

=== SEA Games, MSC 2022 and the new era ===
Kiboy was chosen as the representative of Indonesia for the 2021 SEA Games in Vietnam. There, Indonesia claimed the silver medal after losing to the Philippines by 3–1 in the final.

ONIC qualified to MSC 2022 even losing to RRQ Hoshi in the grand final of season 9. Kiboy was also awarded First Team Winner. In the group stage, ONIC finished bottom and failed to qualify for the playoffs. In the first match, they lost to Myanmar giant, Falcons Esports and drew against TODAK. This is considered one of the biggest flop for the team as their rival and also MSC representative, RRQ Hoshi, went to the grand final.

After their worst campaign in MSC 2022, ONIC signed two Filipinos, Kairi and Coach Yeb, forming the strong five-man roster including Kiboy, Kairi, Sanz, Butss and CW. In MPL season 10, they were crowned champion once again after defeating RRQ Hoshi 4–1, thus qualified to MLBB M4 World Championship. In M4, ONIC finished second in the group stage after winning against Malvinas Gaming, which Kiboy also won MVP of the match, and MDH Esports but lost to TODAK. In the knockout stage, ONIC swept Falcon Esports in the Upper Bracket Quarterfinals but fell short to ECHO in the semifinals, thus falling to the Lower Bracket. In the Lower Bracket Quarterfinals, ONIC won against The Valley but were swept by RRQ Hoshi in the Lower Bracket Semifinal and finished 4th place.

=== MSC 2023 triumph ===
In MPL season 11, ONIC swept EVOS Legends in the grand final, booking their ticket to MSC 2023 in Cambodia. He also represented Indonesia in the 2023 SEA Games where Indonesia surprisingly lost to the host Cambodia and Myanmar, failing to qualify for the playoffs.

ONIC kicked off their MSC 2023 campaign with a sweep against the host, BURN x FLASH, and against the North American representative, Outplay. In the knockout stage, ONIC continued their domination by sweeping EVOS Legends and the Filipino giant, ECHO, and won 4–2 against Blacklist International. Kiboy was named the Final MVP after his stellar performance in the grand final.

=== 3-peats and MLBB M5 World Championship ===
ONIC qualified to MLBB M5 World Championship after winning 4–2 against Geek Fam in the grand final, becoming the first organization to win 3-peats MPL Indonesia title. Kiboy won another Final MVP and was named First Team Winner.

ONIC dominated the M5 group stage featuring the Cambodian giant, See You Soon, the MENA representative, Triple Esports, and the Brazilian, Bigetron Sons by sweeping them. In the knockout stage, ONIC won 3–2 against Blacklist International in the Upper Bracket Quarterfinals, sweeping both Deus Vult and AP Bren in the Upper Bracket Semifinals and final respectively. In the match against AP Bren, Kiboy won two MVPs of the match, specifically the Tigreal's Ultimate plays that turned the tide of the game in game one, naming him the Knockout Stage Day 6 Star. In the grand final, ONIC once again faced the Filipino champions, AP Bren, in the best-of-seven series. AP Bren took game 1 but ONIC fought one back to tie the match before AP Bren lead 3–1. ONIC bravely brought the game back to tied 3–3. In the last game of the series, ONIC blundered and AP Bren capitulated on ONIC's mistake, ending the series 4–3.

=== 4-peats, MSC 2024 and Season 14 struggles ===
Before the playoffs of Season 13, ONIC entered a partnership with Fnatic, rebranding as Fnatic ONIC. Fnatic ONIC once again crowned champion of MPL season 13 after winning against EVOS Glory 4–2, become the first organization to win 4-peats MPL Indonesia title. Kiboy was also named in the Dream Team.

In MSC 2024, Fnatic ONIC was placed with See You Soon, Selangor Red Giants and Team Falcon. Fnatic ONIC won against Team Falcons but shockingly lost against a coach-less team, See You Soon, and drew against the eventual MSC Champion, Selangor Red Giants. Fnatic ONIC failed to defend their title after crashing out from the group stage.

In the 14th season of MPL Indonesia, Fnatic ONIC finished 4th in the regular season standings and didn't qualify for the Upper Bracket, ending their 7 streaks from Season 7 until Season 13. In the playoffs, they lost to Geek Fam 2–3 which in game 5 the game went up to 41 minutes, the longest in Season 14. They finished 5-6th place, their worst placement in MPL ID history.

== Seasons overview ==
Team	Year	Season	League	Domestic Title	MSC Cup	MPLI Invitational	M-Series World Championship
ONIC Prodigy	2020	Season 1	MDL ID	5th–8th	—N/a		
ONIC Prodigy	2020	Season 2	MDL ID	3rd–4th	—N/a		
ONIC Esports	2021	Season 7	MPL ID	4th	Did not qualify	—N/a	
ONIC Esports	2021	Season 8	MPL ID	1st	—N/a	1st	9th–12th
ONIC Esports	2022	Season 9	MPL ID	2nd	9th–12th	—N/a	
ONIC Esports	2022	Season 10	MPL ID	1st	—N/a		4th
ONIC Esports	2023	Season 11	MPL ID	1st	1st	—N/a	
ONIC Esports	2023	Season 12	MPL ID	1st	—N/a	1st	2nd
Fnatic ONIC	2024	Season 13	MPL ID	1st	9th–12th	—N/a	

== Personal achievements ==
=== International Title(s) ===
- 1x MSC champion (2023)
- 1x MPLI Invitational champion (2021)

=== MPL Indonesia ===
- 5x MPL Indonesia champion (S8, S10-S13)
- 1x MPL Indonesia Grand Finals MVP (S12)
- 4x MPL Indonesia First Team Winner (S9, S11-S13)

=== MDL Indonesia ===
- 1x MDL Indonesia First Team Winner (S2)
