= Kairi (gamer) =

Filipino professional esports player (born 2005)

Personal information
- Name: Kairi Rayosdelsol
- Nickname(s): Kairi; Fullclip; Child Prodigy; King of the Jungle; The Sky King; Kumar
- Born: Kairi Ygnacio Rayosdelsol; September 21, 2005 (age 21); Limay, Bataan, Philippines
- Nationality: Philippines

Current team
- Team: ONIC Esports
- Role: Jungler
- Game: Mobile Legends: Bang Bang
- League: MPL Indonesia

Career information
- Playing career: 2020–present

Team history
- 2020: Blacklist International
- 2020–2022: ONIC Philippines
- 2022–present: ONIC Indonesia

Career highlights and awards
- 1x MSC champion (2023); 1x Snapdragon Pro Series champion (2023); 1x Snapdragon Pro Series Grand Finals MVP (2023); 1x MPLI Invitational champion (2022); 6x MPL Indonesia champion (S10-S13, S15, S16); 2x MPL Indonesia Regular Season Most Valuable Player (S10, S12); 2x MPL Indonesia Grand Finals MVP (S10, S16); 6x MPL Indonesia First Team Winner (S10-S12, S15, S16); 1x MPL Indonesia Second Team Winner (S13); 1x MPL Indonesia Dream Team Inductee (S13); 1x MPL Philippines Team of the Season (S8); MPL Philippines Hall of Legends Inductee (2024)

Kairi Ygnacio Rayosdelsol (born September 21, 2005), known as Kairi (formerly Fullclip), is a Filipino professional esports player for the game Mobile Legends: Bang Bang. He is the current jungler for Indonesian team ONIC Esports.

Hailing from Bataan, Kairi went pro in 2020 under Blacklist International as the team's rookie Jungler, playing alongside Edward Jay "Edward" Dapadap and veterans Mark "Eson" Gerardo and Dexter Louise "Dex Star" Alaba. Kairi became an initial keystone part of a trade involving the "VeeWise" tandem which included Daneire James "Wise" Del Rosario and Johnmar "OhMyV33Nus" Villaluna.

Following the trade, Kairi signed with ONIC Philippines but would later transition as a mid-laner for a season prior to his return to the Jungler role. Kairi stayed with ONIC Philippines for three seasons before transferring to its sister roster in Indonesia, ONIC Esports during the offseason of MPL Indonesia Season 10. Kairi and fellow ONIC Philippines member and Head Coach Denver "Yeb" Miranda were the first Filipino imports to another country.

Kairi is a professional Mobile Legends: Bang Bang plater who primarily plays as a jungler. He has competed with ONIC Esports, contributing to the team's domestic and international achievements. Notably, he was part of the roster that won the Mobile Legends: Bang Bang Southeast Asia Cup title in 2023. He also contributed to ONIC Esports securing four consecutive MPL Indonesia titles.

== Background ==
Kairi Ygnacio Rayosdelsol was born on September 21, 2005 in Limay, Bataan. His father, Dags Rayosdelsol was an OFW (Overseas Filipino Worker) to support him and his family. In a Zoom interview with ANC, Dags described Kairi as a fast learner in MOBAS, specifically Dota 2. He also said how smart Kairi was, especially in Mathematics, often getting into math competitions at school. Kairi's father would often bond with him by playing some online games together especially MOBA type of games at their local internet café.

Kairi's signature heroes are assassin type such as Hayabusa, Ling, Fanny and Lancelot. His story was loosely adapted into the 2026 Indonesian feature film Nobody Loves Kay. He was portrayed by actor Bima Azriel.

== Career ==
=== Blacklist International ===
In 2020, Blacklist International signed Rayosdelsol to its main roster alongside Edward Jay "EDWARD" Dapadap, a close friend of his and is also from Bataan. Rayosdelsol started as Blacklist International's starting Jungler. Despite his age, many nicknamed Kairi "The Future" for his fast mechanics and plays. Notable hero picks from Kairi were the Lancelot when used properly, can abuse its first skill to dash for an unlimited time. He used his fast-paced advantage to propel Blacklist into the playoffs. However, Blacklist would not advance further in the competition after losing 2–3 to Smart Omega in the Quarterfinals. At the time, MPL Philippines Season 6 did not follow a double-elimination tournament bracket, thus eliminating Blacklist and settling for a 5th–8th finish.

=== ONIC Philippines ===
In 2021, Kairi was sold by Blacklist International and joined ONIC Philippines after the VeeWise tandem transferred from ONIC to Blacklist. Kairi, initially wanting to start as the starting Jungler, was forced to move to the mid-lane due to his teammate Jaylord "Hate" Gonzales' minimal hero pool. Hate is also a Jungler that joined ONIC. Regardless, Kairi's opening game with his new team showed promise as they were able to 2–1 defending world champions Bren Esports (now AP Bren) during the regular season. However, ONIC Philippines would face an underwhelming Season 7 as the team finished fourth among five teams in Group A. However, their 7–6 record was more than enough to qualify for the playoffs. ONIC however, would foresee an early playoff exit, losing in five games to eventual finalists Execration in the Lower Bracket knockouts.

Kairi would remain with ONIC Philippines for Season 8 and has made a name for himself as one of the best upcoming Junglers in the league. In Season 8, Kairi would return as the starting Jungler for ONIC Philippines and it transpired to an opening 2–0 victory over ECHO Philippines in the regular season. During Season 8, the most notable upsets was during Week 6 when ONIC defeated the undefeated, 11–0 Blacklist International, 2–0. Regarded as part of one of the best teams in Season 8, ONIC finished with a 9–5 record during the regular season and a 21–13 match rate, giving them 27 points in the regular season and qualifying for the first leg of the Upper Brackets. Led by Kairi's Ling pick, the team advanced to the Upper Bracket Finals after a dominant 3–0 sweep against Nexplay EVOS (now Minana EVOS). Kairi put up a 5/0/3 KDA during Game 3, setting up an Upper Bracket finals date with Smart Omega. It was one-sided heading into the final moments of the Upper Bracket Finals as ONIC sweeps Smart Omega 3–0 to qualify for the M3 World Championships in Singapore. Season 8 was Kairi's first MPL Philippines Grand Finals appearance and his first MLBB World series appearance. However, Kairi and ONIC would lose in a 4–1 score to his former team, Blacklist International. Blacklist became the second team to win back-to-back titles since Sunsparks who defeated ONIC Philippines in both series.

==== MLBB M3 World Championships ====
As the second-place team representing the Philippines, ONIC Philippines secured qualification for the prestigious M3 World Championships held in Singapore. Initially grouped alongside formidable contenders including Malaysian powerhouse TODAK, Indonesia's ONIC Esports, and Brazil's Keyd Esports, ONIC faced a challenging pool of competitors. However, through a decisive tiebreaking match against Keyd, ONIC emerged triumphant, securing the top seed in Group B for the tournament. In their inaugural match, ONIC Philippines faced RSG Singapore. Employing strategic selections like Yi Sun-shin and Natan in the Jungle, Kairi orchestrated a commanding performance, dealing RSG a formidable defeat as ONIC advanced confidently to the quarterfinals. ONIC swept RSG Singapore 3–0 with Kairi finishing as the series MVP. In the upper bracket semifinals, ONIC Philippines faced Indonesia’s RRQ Hoshi. Setting up a best of 5 series between both powerhouses, ONIC Philippines thwarted the Indonesian runner-up 3–0 to advance to the Upper bracket finals. In the upper bracket finals, ONIC faced off against BloodThirstyKings (BTK), the champions of the North American Challenger Tournament (NACT), the official qualifying tournament for North American teams to M3. Led by Michael “MobaZane” Cosgun, ONIC was the second Filipino team to face BTK after a 3–2 victory over Blacklist International during the quarterfinals. However, ONIC Philippines denied crucial hero picks for BTK that sent the team to the Grand Finals for the first time in the organization’s history and Kairi’s first of two Grand Finals in the tournament. ONIC Philippines faced Blacklist International in the Grand Finals, the first all-Filipino grand finals in M-series history. Blacklist won the tournament in a 4-0 game clean sweep, ending his hope of taking his first international title.

Kairi returned for MPL Philippines Season 9 with the same lineup of teammates. However, their run in Season 9 proved to be tougher than their previous campaign as the team finished in fifth with a 8–6 record and a 18–19 match record. ONIC nearly escaped a 3–2 series against Nexplay EVOS but the team would fall to fourth as Smart Omega dismantled ONIC Philippines and their subsequent title run for both Season 9 and MSC.

=== ONIC Esports ===
During the offseason, ONIC Philippines released their M3 and Season 9 roster which included Kairi. On July 4, 2022, it was formally confirmed through a press conference that Head Coach Denver “Yeb” Miranda and Kairi is transferring to Indonesia, notably to the organization’s sister team, ONIC Esports. Delivering on Filipino experience to an all-Indonesian team, ONIC Esports finished with an 11–3 record and a 25–13 match record in its first season with Kairi and Yeb. The team thwarted Bigetron Alpha but lost in four games against RRQ Hoshi. However, after a four-game series over AURA Fire, ONIC Esports won the third organization title in MPL Indonesia. Kairi's addition to the roster hailed him as the Regular Season MVP and the Grand Finals MVP.

==== MLBB M4 World Championships ====
The M4 World championship was held in Indonesia for the very first time. As champions, ONIC Esports automatically qualified alongside RRQ Hoshi for M4. The team was grouped alongside Malaysian runner-up TODAK, Latam Super League runner-up Malvinas Gaming and Mekong qualifier MDH Esports. The team finished 2–1 in the group stage and was bracketed against Myanmar's Falcon Esports. ONIC swept Myanmar's Falcon Esports to advance in the Upper Bracket Finals against MPL Philippines' runner up ECHO Philippines which had the services of Karl Gabriel "KarlTzy" Nepomuceno. ONIC lost to ECHO in four games to face North America's The Valley in the lower bracket quarterfinals.

ONIC Esports defeated The Valley in four games and advanced to the semifinals. There, ONIC Esports lost in a 3–0 sweep over co-Indonesian representatives RRQ Hoshi.

==== MSC 2023 ====
ONIC Esports defeated EVOS Legends in MPL Indonesia Season 11's Grand Finals, bringing the organization's fourth title. This qualifies ONIC to the Mobile Legends: Bang Bang Southeast Asia Cup 2023 in Cambodia. ONIC was grouped with Cambodian champions BURN x FLASH and North American representatives, Team Outplay. Initially, BTK were to represent the region however, after the team failed to meet the requirements of the tournament, Team Outplay were declared as the replacement to BTK. In the single-elimination bracket, ONIC swept EVOS Legends during the Quarterfinals and swept M4 World Champions ECHO to qualify for the grand finals in MSC 2023. This will be the second-consecutive Indonesian team to reach the Grand Finals in MSC since RRQ qualified for MSC 2022's Grand Finals against RSG Philippines. ONIC defeated Blacklist International in the Grand Finals as ONIC won its second MSC cup in the organization's history.

==== MLBB M5 World Championships ====
ONIC defeated Geek Fam Indonesia in the Grand Finals to win the organization's fifth title and its third consecutive MPL Indonesia title, the first three-peat in MPL Indonesia. This qualifies ONIC Esports to M5, the first M-series to be held in the Philippines and the organization's third-consecutive appearance in the world championships. ONIC won their group opener against Bigetron Sons, the team finished as the top team in Group C with an undefeated 6–0 record. ONIC is one of the two teams to go undefeated during the group stages, the other being AP Bren.

During the knockout stage, ONIC defeated Blacklist International in a close five-game series in the quarterfinals and defeated CIS representatives Deus Vult in the semifinals 3–0. The team would move forward to the Grand Finals after a 3–0 sweep over AP Bren in the upper bracket finals, the first M-Series grand finale to have an Indonesian team since M1. With the victory over AP Bren, Kairi moves to his second world championship final since M3. AP Bren swept Blacklist International in the lower bracket finals to face ONIC for a rematch. Kairi and ONIC fell in a 3–1 deficit to AP Bren. However, ONIC won the next two games that sent the Grand Finale to a Game 7.

In a crucial Lord pick during the final moments of Game 7, Kairi on the utility and mobile hero Baxia checked on the middle bush where he subsequently got killed after three AP Bren members were waiting for him. This ultimately sealed ONIC's chances of the M5 title as the team lost in 7 games to AP Bren.

== Seasons overview ==
Team	Year	Season	League	Domestic Title	MSC Cup	MPLI Invitational	M-Series World Championship
Blacklist International	2020	Season 6	MPL PH	5th–8th	—N/a	—N/a	Did not qualify
ONIC Philippines	2021	Season 7	MPL PH	7th–8th	Did not qualify	—N/a	—N/a
ONIC Philippines	2021	Season 8	MPL PH	2nd	—N/a	9th-12th	2nd
ONIC Philippines	2022	Season 9	MPL PH	2nd	Did not qualify	—N/a	—N/a
ONIC Esports	2022	Season 10	MPL ID	1st	—N/a	1st	4th
ONIC Esports	2023	Season 11	MPL ID	1st	1st	—N/a	—N/a
ONIC Esports	2023	Season 12	MPL ID	1st	—N/a	1st	2nd
Fnatic ONIC	2024	Season 13	MPL ID	1st	Qualified	—N/a	
Fnatic ONIC	2024	Season 14	MPL ID	5th–6th	—N/a		Did not qualify
ONIC Esports	2025	Season 15	MPL ID	1st	4th	—N/a	
ONIC Esports	2025	Season 16	MPL ID	1st	—N/a		7th–8th

== Personal achievements ==
=== International Title(s) ===
- 1x MSC champion (2023)
- ESL Snapdragon Pro Series (Southeast Asia) – Challenge Finals Grand Finals MVP (S3)
- 1x MPLI Invitational champion (2022)

=== MPL Philippines ===
- 1x Team of the Season (S8)

=== MPL Indonesia ===
- 4x MPL Indonesia champion (S10-S13)
- 2x MPL Indonesia Regular Season Most Valuable Player (S10, S12)
- 2x MPL Indonesia Grand Finals MVP (S10, S16)
- 3x MPL Indonesia First Team Winner (S10-S12)
