= Mobile Legends: Bang Bang Mid Season Cup =

Esports tournament

Tournament information
- Sport: Mobile Legends: Bang Bang
- Location: Worldwide (2023–present); Regional SEA (2017–2022)
- Month played: September (2017); July (2018, 2024–present); June (2019–2023, 2024: Wildcard stage)
- Established: 2017; 9 years ago
- Number of tournaments: 8
- Administrator: Moonton
- Tournament formats: Wildcard stage; Round robin (2024); Double elimination (2025–present); Group stage; Round robin (2018–2024); Double elimination (2025–present); Knockout stage; Double elimination (2017, 2019–2022); Single elimination (2018, 2023–present)
- Hosts: List: Jakarta (2017, 2018); Manila (2019); Cancelled (2020); Online Tournament (2021); Kuala Lumpur (2022); Phnom Penh (2023); Riyadh (2024–2025); Paris (MSC 2026)
- Participants: 8 teams (2017); 10 teams (2018); 12 teams (2019–2023); 23 teams (2024–2025); 25 teams (2026-present)
- Defending champions: (Serbia) Team Spirit (1st title)
- Most championships: (Indonesia) ONIC Esports (2 titles)
- Website: mcl.mobilelegends.com

Most recent tournament
- MSC 2026

Mobile Legends: Bang Bang Mid Season Cup, (previously known as Mobile Legends: Bang Bang Southeast Asia Cup), referred to as MSC, is an annual international tournament for professional esport teams for the MOBA game Mobile Legends: Bang Bang hosted by Moonton during the halfway point of each year split since 2017.

On 1 January 2024, Moonton announced the rebranding of the formerly SEA-based tournament from "Southeast Asia Cup" to the "Mid Season Cup" as the first international tournament before the second leg of MLBB professional leagues. The Mid Season Cup took place in Riyadh, Saudi Arabia. This year saw the introduction of the wildcard format, which will bring in eight international teams to fight for a slot in the group stage happening in July.

The current champions are Team Spirit, who won their first MSC title and became the first European Team to win an International title in any Moonton-sanctioned tournament. They defeated Myanmar's Yangon Galacticos in seven games.

MSC at the 2026 Esports World Cup brings together the world's best MLBB teams from across five competitive regions, underscoring the continued expansion of MLBB Esports' global ecosystem. The 2026 edition brings the tournament to Europe for the first time and introduces new qualification pathways for India, Thailand, South Korea, and Western Europe.

MSC set a viewership record at the 2026 Esports World Cup (EWC), reaching 2.88 million peak concurrent viewers (PCV) — the highest figure of any tournament at EWC 2026.

== History ==
=== As the Southeast Asian Cup (2017–2023) ===
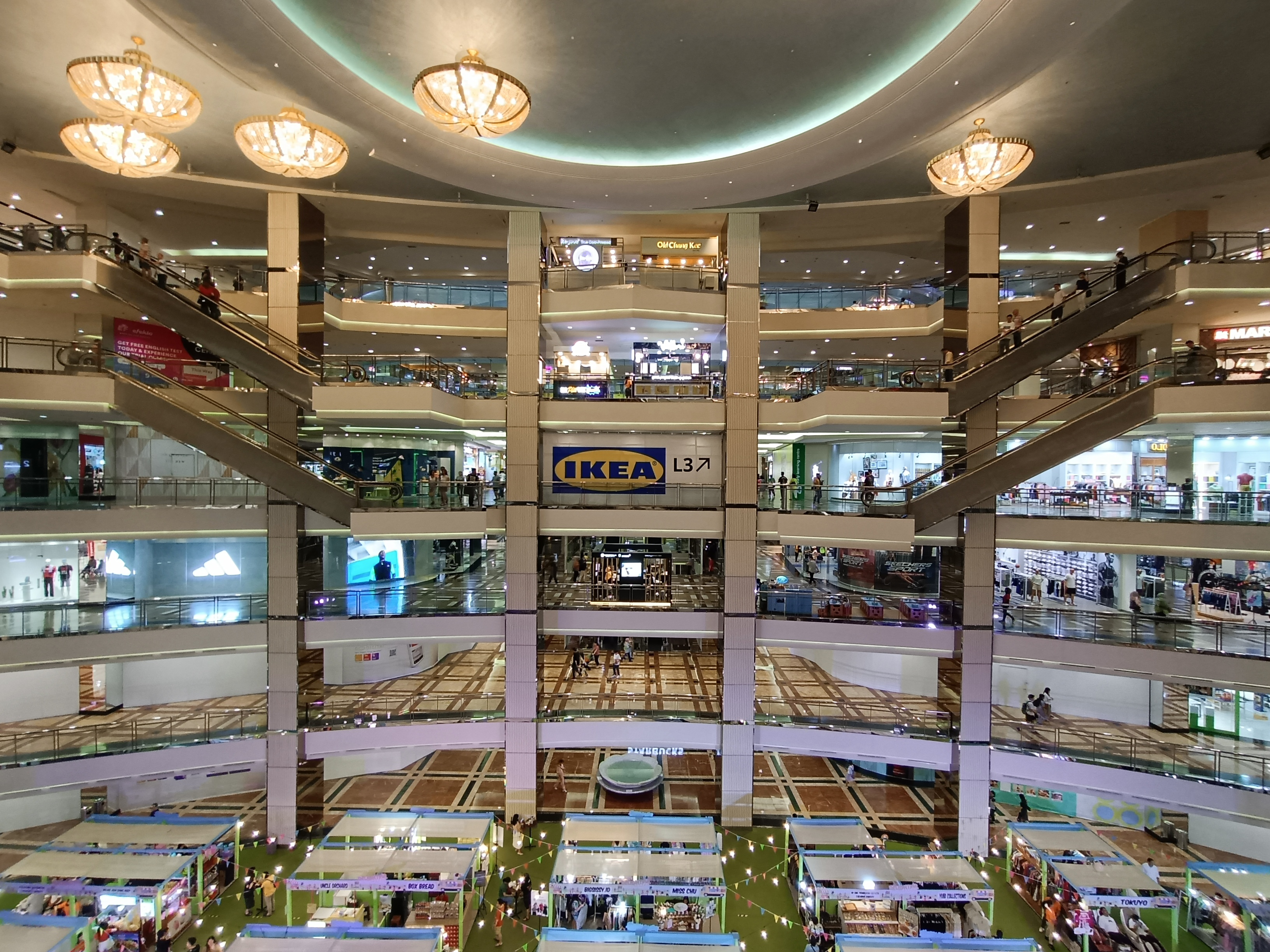
Mall Taman Anggrek, the venue for MSC 2017

==== 2017 ====
The inaugural Mobile Legends: Bang Bang Southeast Asia Cup was held at the Mall Taman Anggrek in Jakarta, Indonesia from September 1 to 3, 2017. MSC 2017 was the inaugural and smallest iteration, with only eight teams competing. Hosted by game developers Moonton, the first iteration of MSC was designed for the growing Mobile Legends: Bang Bang communities teams in Southeast Asia, primarily Indonesia, the Philippines, Malaysia, Singapore, Cambodia, and Thailand.

The tournament was played on a double-elimination playoff bracket format, with all matches excluding the Grand Finals being best-of-threes (Bo3). Thailand's IDONOTSLEEP were crowned the inaugural MSC champions after sweeping the Philippine team Salty Salad in the Grand Finals 3-0. Prior to 2026, this was the only MSC title outside of the "Maphilindo" sphere of regions in MLBB until Team Spirit won in 2026.

==== 2018 ====
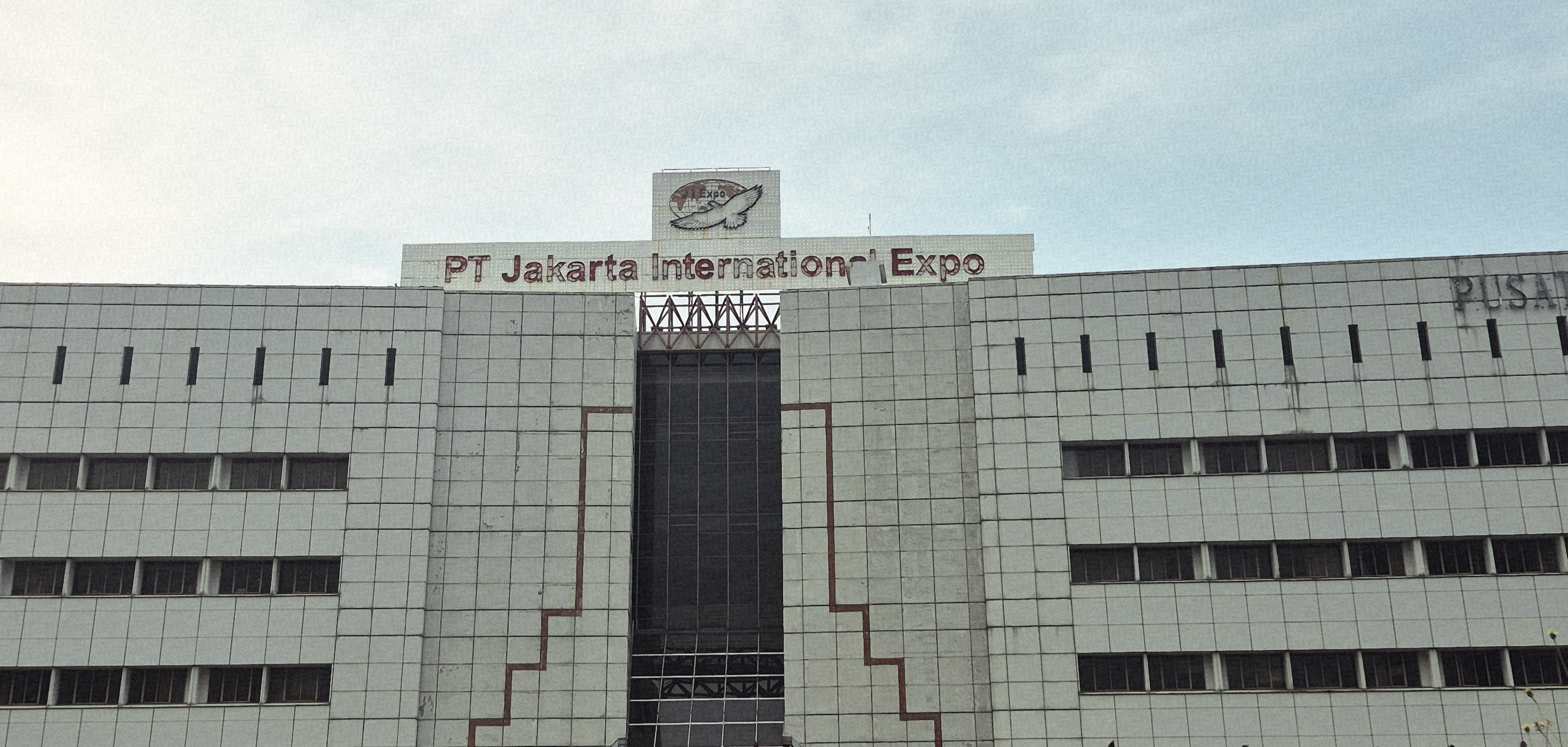
Jakarta International Expo, the venue for MSC 2018

The second iteration of MSC was held from 27–29 July 2018 at the Jakarta International Expo again in Jakarta, Indonesia. This iteration expanded the team participation from eight to ten, with three of the first major professional leagues of MLBB—MPL Indonesia, MPL Philippines, and MPL MYSG—sending two of their teams each, primarily the champions and the runner-up teams of the very first professional seasons. Included in the qualified teams were three other qualifying regions from Thailand, Vietnam, and Cambodia, notably IDONOTSLEEP, the defending MSC champions qualified to defend the title.

The group stage format was introduced for the second iteration, with all teams being split into two groups to play a single round-robin, best-of-three (Bo3) to qualify to the knockout stage. The top two teams from both groups would qualify to the said stage. The Philippines' champions Aether Main won the Philippines' first of three MSC titles after sweeping the Season 1 runner-up of MPL Philippines Digital Devils Pro, 3–0.

==== 2019 ====
The third iteration of MSC was held for the first time in the Philippines from 19–23 June 2019 at the Araneta Coliseum in Quezon City. This iteration saw the adoption of the group stage format from the second iteration, and the double-elimination playoff bracket from the first iteration of the tournament. Participation was expanded from ten teams to twelve. In this same year, Moonton unveiled its year-ending tournament, the Mobile Legends: Bang Bang World Championship, the first world championship series for the game. In this third iteration of MSC, MPL Myanmar's champions and runner-up now up the main eight teams coming from the MPL regions, while three teams from Thailand, Cambodia and Laos qualified for this event. Defending champions Bren Esports (formerly Aether Main's roster) qualified as the runner-up team from MPL Philippines Season 3.

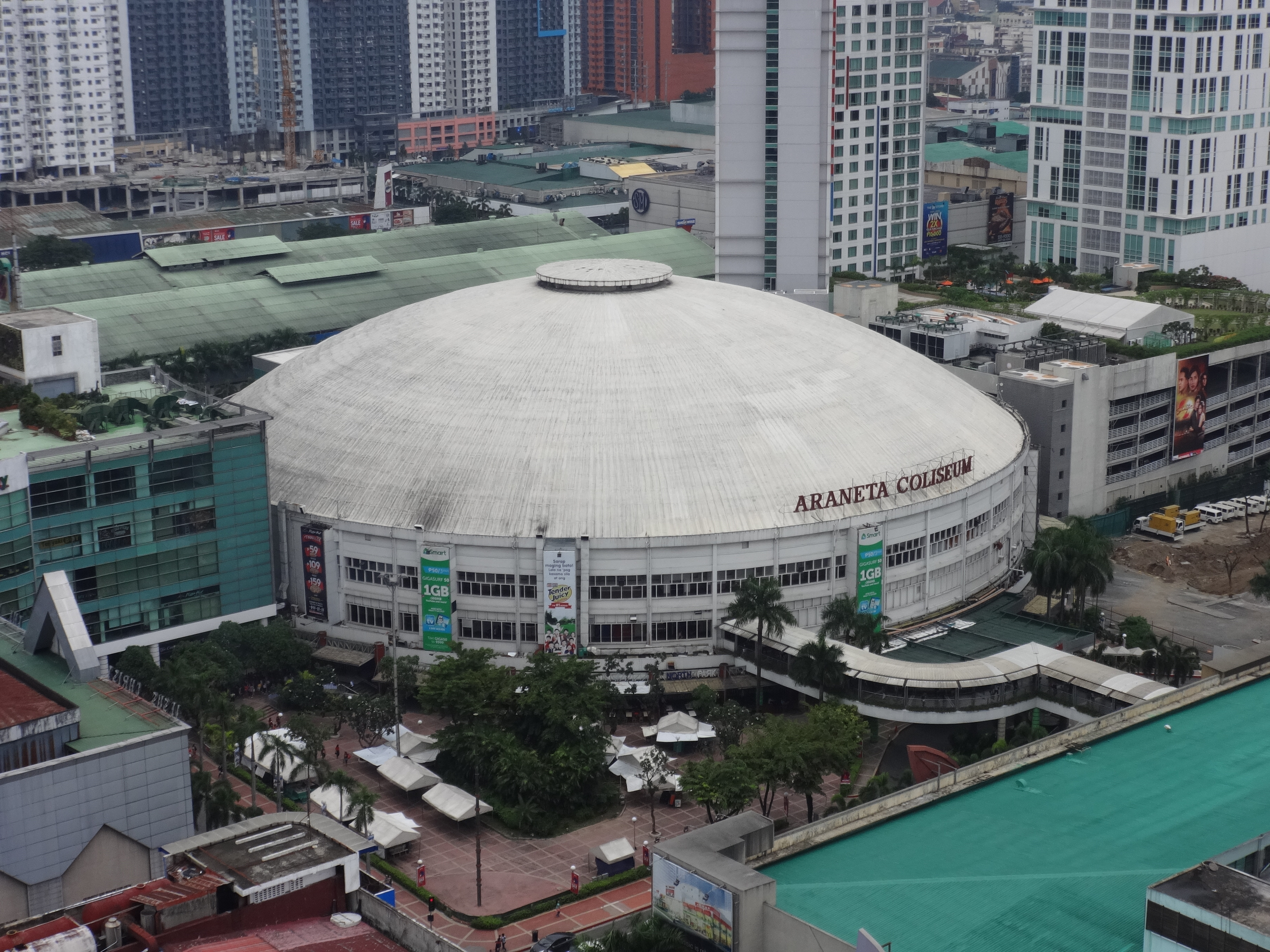
Smart Araneta Coliseum, the venue for MSC 2019

The twelve teams were split into four groups of three, with the top one from each group advancing to the upper bracket, while the bottom two advanced to the inaugural play-in tournament. Four teams qualified for the lower bracket in the play-in tournament, while the four top teams competed in the upper bracket. MPL Indonesia's champions ONIC Esports swept fellow Indonesian team and runner-up Louvre Esports in the Grand Finals, 3–0. This was ONIC Esports' first of two MSC titles in its organization's history, the most by any team. Notably, this was the Philippines' worst performance in MSC to date, with ArkAngel getting swept in the lower-bracket finals by Louvre.

==== 2020 ====
The fourth iteration of MSC was cancelled due to the travel restrictions imposed by countries in the wake of the COVID-19 pandemic.

==== 2021 ====
The fifth iteration of MSC was held online due to the ongoing COVID-19 pandemic. All teams participating were in their respective boot camps or a single structure during the competition. Blacklist International and Execration, the Philippine representatives competed in the same room together during MSC 2021, split by just a simple barrier.

MSC 2021 saw the second Philippines vs. Philippines Grand Finals in MSC history, with Blacklist International facing up against Execration. Blacklist, the Season 7 champions, swept Indonesia's EVOS Legends in the upper bracket finals 3-0, while Execration, the season 7 runner-up, won in four games against EVOS in the lower-bracket finals. Unlike in the season 7 grand finals, MSC 2021 saw Execration win the MSC 2021 title 4-1. Grant "Kelra" Pillas was named Finals MVP.

==== 2022 ====
The sixth iteration of MSC was the first since 2019 to be held in person, at the Malaysia International Trade and Exhibition Centre in Kuala Lumpur, Malaysia. Despite the ongoing COVID-19 pandemic, restrictions for MSC 2022 remained tightly regulated, especially with the presence of a crowd for the first time in two years. MSC 2019 was held from 11–19 June 2022. This year saw the adoption of MSC 2019's group stage and knockout stage format, excluding the play-in tournament. MSC 2019's group stage qualified the top two teams in each of the four groups to the knockouts, with the bottom team being eliminated outright.

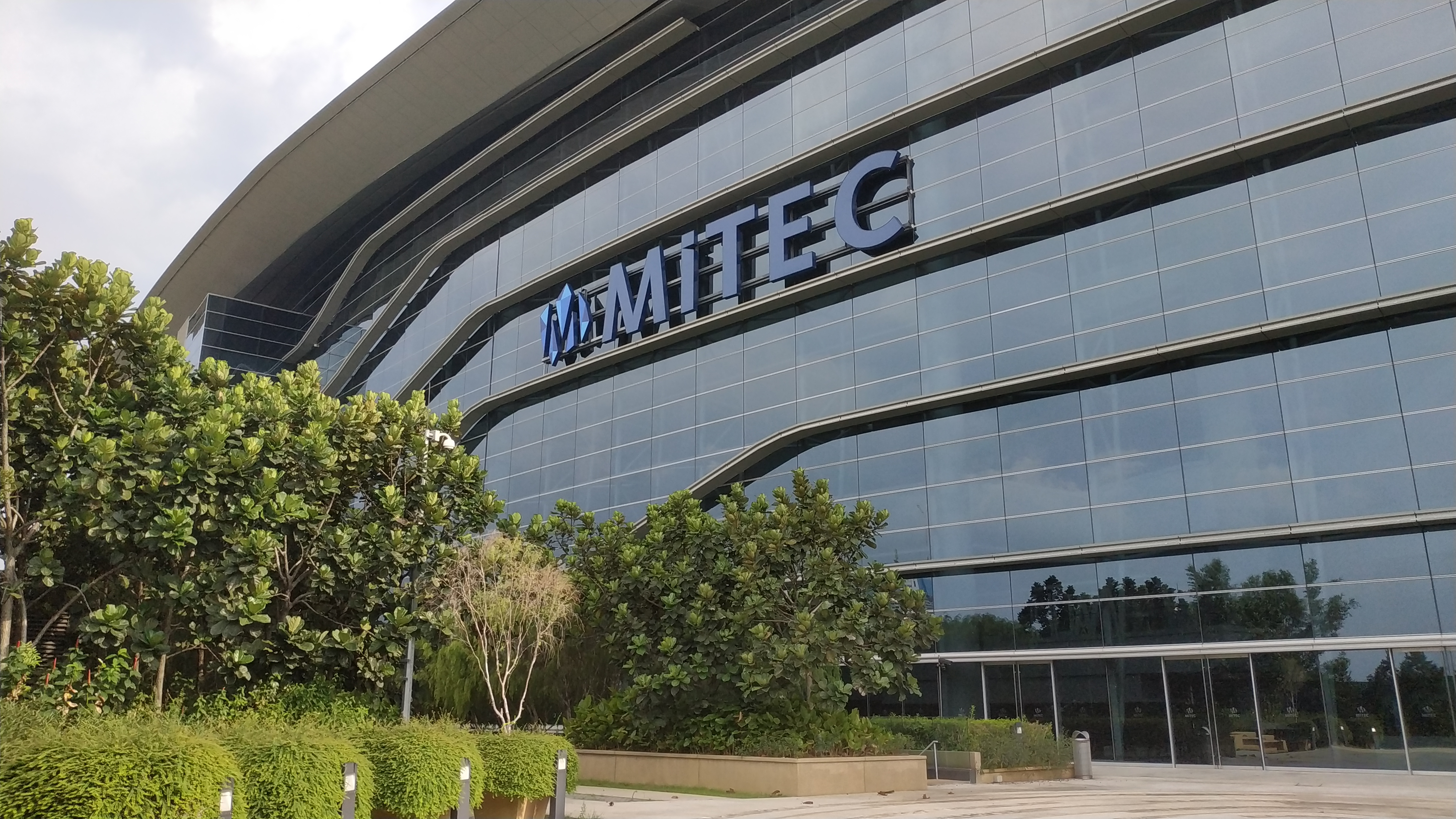
Malaysia International Trade and Exhibition Centre, the venue for MSC 2022

MPL Indonesia Season 9 champions RRQ Hoshi won over MPL Philippines Season 9 champions RSG Philippines in the upper-bracket finals to deliver Indonesia's first grand finals appearance in three years. RSG Philippines won 3-2 against Season 9 runner-up Smart Omega and defending Finals MVP Pillas. RSG Philippines swept RRQ Hoshi 4-0 to win the Philippines' third and, as of 2025, last MSC title. Emman "EMMAN" Sangco was named Finals MVP.

==== 2023 ====
The seventh and final iteration of MSC as the Southeast Asian Cup was held from 10–18 June 2023 in AEON Mall Mean Chey in Phnom Penh, Cambodia, the first tournament held outside of the Maphilindo sphere. By showcasing the first international participation of teams from the Middle East and North African region (MENA), North America (NA), and Turkey, with Team Occupy, Outplay and Fire Flux Impunity representing their regions, respectively, the MSC transformed itself into a currently S-Tier tournament. Similar to MSC 2022, the group stage format was adopted; however, MSC 2023 returned the single-elimination playoff bracket for the first time since MSC 2018.

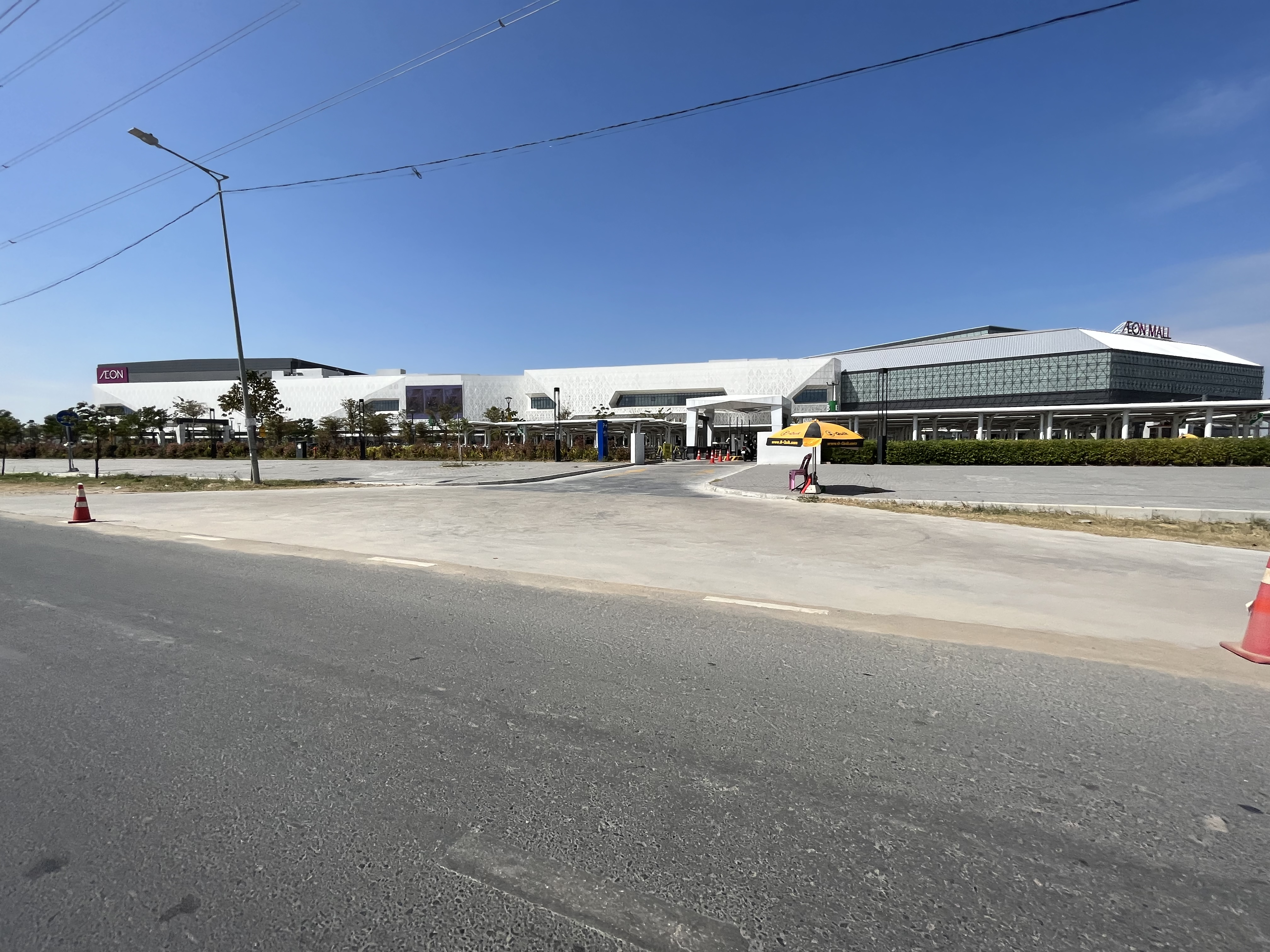
AEON Mall Mean Chey, the venue for MSC 2023

MPL Indonesia Season 11 champions and MSC 2019 champions ONIC Esports returned to the MSC Grand Finals for the first time since 2019 after sweeping MPL Philippines Season 11 champions ECHO Philippines in the semifinals. MPL Philippines Season 11 runner-up and MSC 2021 runner-up Blacklist International returned to the MSC Grand Finals for the first time since 2021 after they won 3-1 against home-town team BURN x Flash in the semifinals. ONIC Esports brought the MSC title back to Indonesia—and an international title by technicality—for the first time in four years after winning against Blacklist International 4-2. Nicky "Kiboy" Fernando was named Finals MVP.

=== As the Mid Season Cup (2024-present) ===
==== 2024 ====
The first iteration of the rebranded Mid Season Cup was held from 28 June to 14 July 2024 in Boulevard City, Saudi Arabia. The cup was held for the first time outside of Southeast Asia, and for the first time in MENA, after MSC was put as one of the main tournaments for Mobile Legends: Bang Bang in the inaugurated global esports tournament, the Esports World Cup. MSC 2024 inaugurated the participation of six new regions: Latin America (LATAM), China, Mekong (primarily Vietnam), Eastern Europe and Central Asia (EECA), South Asia (primarily Nepal), and Mongolia. MSC 2024 adopted the Wild Card stage for the first time in tournament history after it was previously used during the MLBB M5 World Championships. Alluding to the group stage format of MSC 2023, the top two teams from four groups would advance to the knockout stage, with MSC 2024 adopting the single-elimination knockout bracket.

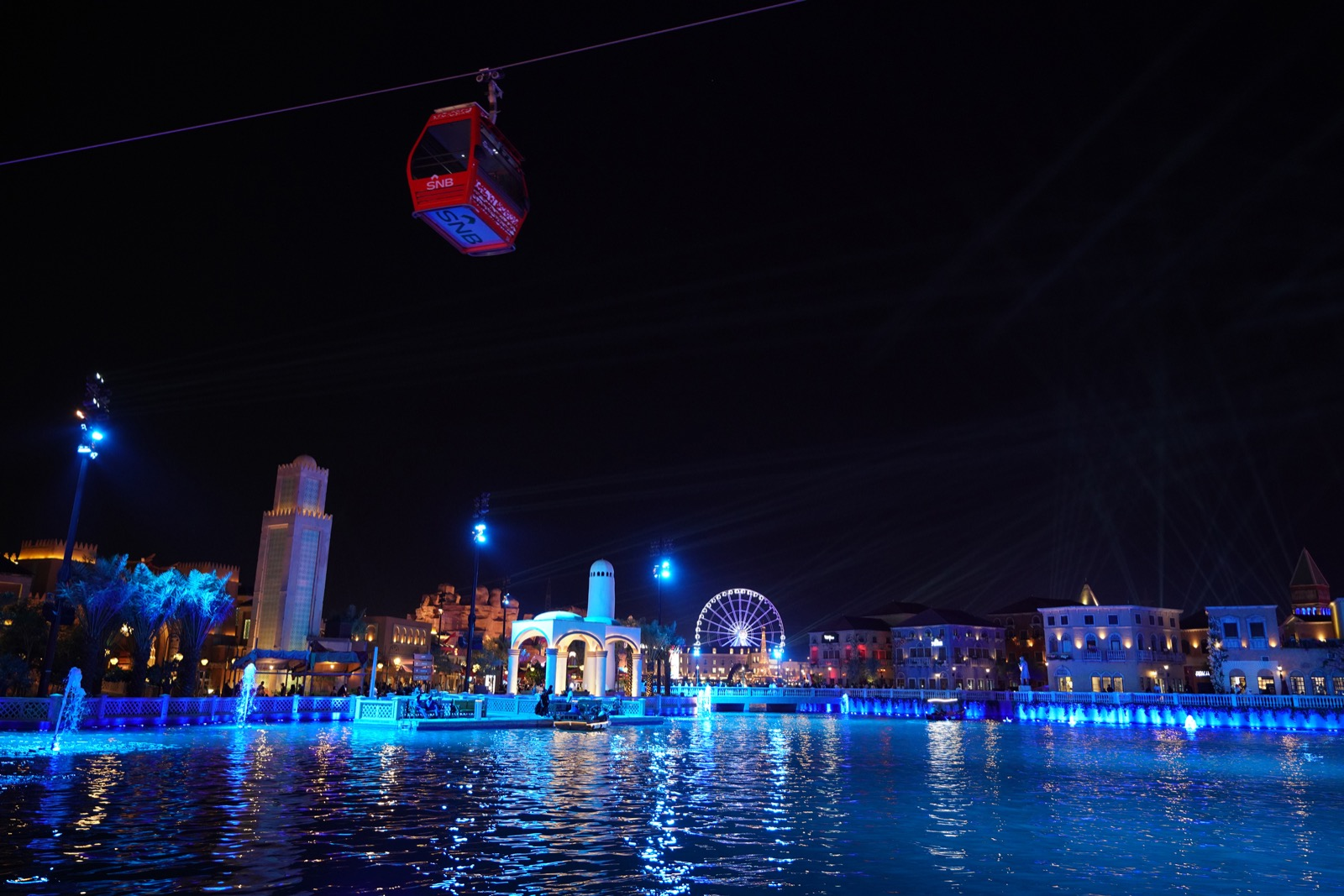
Boulevard City, the venue for MSC 2024 and 2025, and the venue of the Esports World Cup

MPL Malaysia Season 13 champions Selangor Red Giants swept MPL Singapore Season 7 champions NIP Flash, while MPL Philippines Season 13 runner-up Falcons AP Bren won 3-1 against Season 13 champions Liquid ECHO. MSC 2024 was significant as the first iteration of a Philippines vs. Malaysia Grand Finals. MSC 2024, to date, was the worst performance by Indonesia, with none of its representative qualifying for the knockout stage., notably defending champions Fnatic ONIC Indonesia. Selangor Red Giants won the MSC 2024 title, 4-3 against Falcons AP Bren, the first Malaysian team to win the MSC tournament and the first international title for Malaysia. Muhammad Haqqullah "Sekys" Ahmad Shahrul Zaman was named Finals MVP.

==== 2025 ====
The second iteration of the Mid Season Cup returned to the 2025 Esports World Cup from 10 July to 2 August 2025. This was the second time since MSC 2017 and 2018 that back-to-back iterations of the tournament were held in the same country and region. Defending champions Selangor Red Giants OG Esports were defeated in their title repeat campaign by the Philippines' Team Liquid PH, who won the MSC 2025 title 4-1. Sanford "Sanford" Vinuya was named Finals MVP.

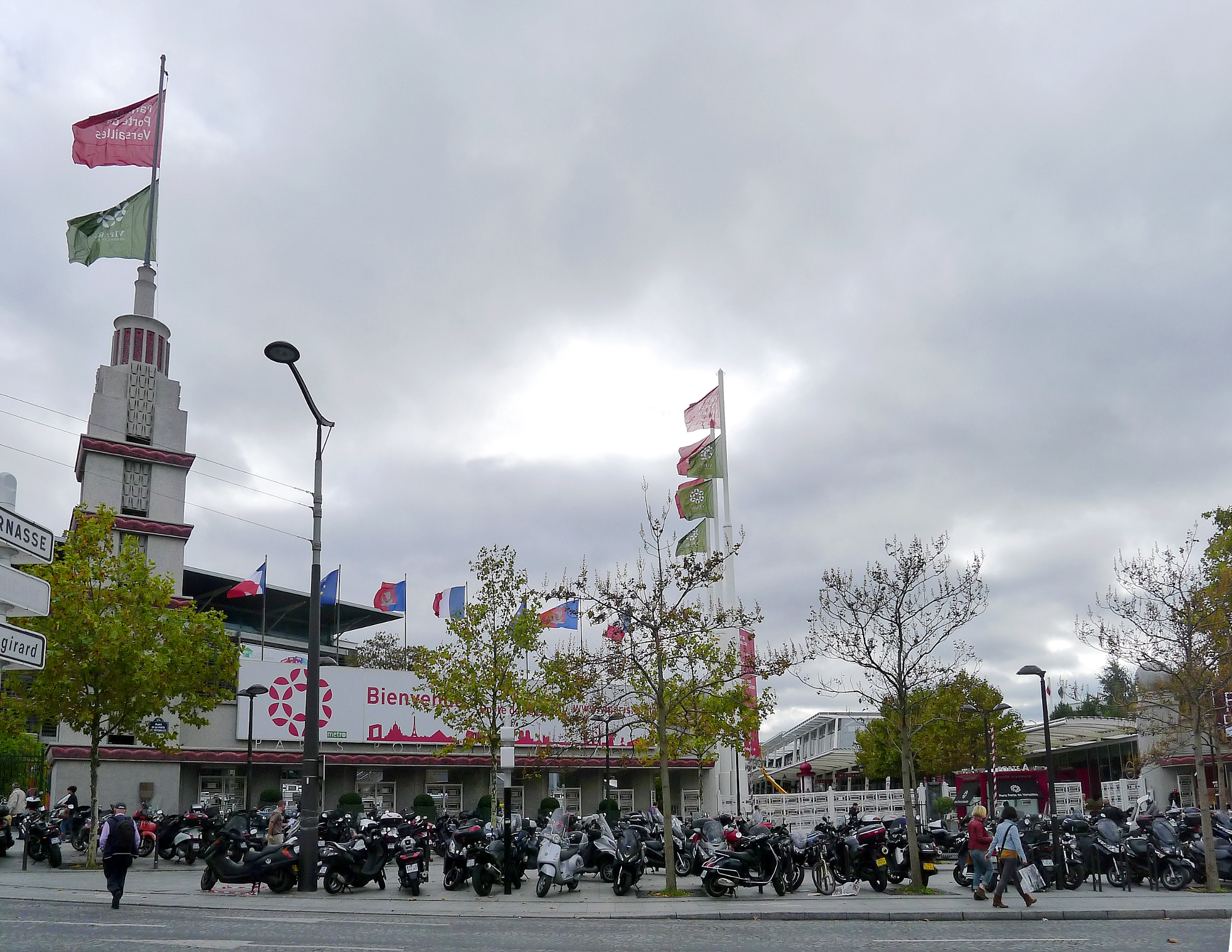
Paris Expo Porte de Versailles, the venue of MSC 2026 and the incoming Esports World Cup for 2026

==== 2026 ====
The third iteration of the Mid Season Cup returned for the 2026 Esports World Cup in a month-long tournament lasting from 1 July to 1 August 2026. This was the first time that the annual tournament moved to a different hosting region, from Asia to Europe. As part of the internationalization of the EWC, MLBB was one of the many esports tournaments whose competition was held in Paris, France.

Defending champions Team Liquid PH experienced an early exit from the tournament after being eliminated in the lower bracket group stage. Notably, none of the teams from Philippines, Indonesia, or Malaysia made it to the Grand Finals for the first time. EECA's Team Spirit won the MSC 2026 title against Myanmar's Yangon Galacticos, 4-3, becoming the first western team to win the event. Mathaios "Kid Bomba" Chatzilakos was named Finals MVP.

==== 2027 ====
MSC 2027 has yet to have its venue released; however, game developers Moonton announced the following on August 7, 2026, about the "Title Defender" System: 1) the reigning MSC champions will earn an automatic berth in the next MSC and will not need to go through the regional qualifier. This gives the MSC's region an additional slot in the main stage, 2) the runner-up of MSC shall be granted a wild card or equivalent entry for the next edition. However, should the runner-up qualify through the regional qualifiers, then the next-seeded team shall be given the continuity.

== Format ==
Two teams from Mobile Legends: Bang Bang Professional Leagues (MPL) in different Southeast Asian countries are invited to MSC. For countries without MPL, local qualifiers are hosted. The tournaments start with a group stage where teams fight for the spot in the upper bracket through the best-of-three round robin. Teams winning the best-of-three in the group stage get the spot in the upper bracket. The other two teams compete on play-ins where the winning team gets to the lower bracket and the losing team is eliminated. After the group stage is the tournament proper. Losing teams from the upper bracket are demoted to the lower bracket, while losing teams from the lower bracket are eliminated. One finalist will come from each bracket and compete in the Grand Finals. From 2017 to 2019, the Grand Finals are played in best-of-five, but since the 2021 version, it is played in best-of-seven.

== Venue ==
- 2017 − Mall Taman Anggrek − Jakarta, Indonesia
- 2018 − JIExpo − Jakarta, Indonesia
- 2019 − Smart Araneta Coliseum − Manila, Philippines
- 2022 − MITEC − Kuala Lumpur, Malaysia
- 2023 − Aeon Mall Mean Chey − Phnom Penh, Cambodia
- 2024 − Amazon Arena, Boulevard City − Riyadh, Saudi Arabia
- 2025 − Boulevard City − Riyadh, Saudi Arabia
- 2026 − Paris Expo Porte de Versailles − Paris, France

== Viewership ==
Mobile Legends: Bang Bang Mid Season Cup is streamed live on Facebook Gaming, TikTok and YouTube.

Year	Peak viewers	Average viewers	Hours watched	Reference
Southeast Asia Cup
2017	53,837	20,102	353,451	
2018	100,000+	N/A	N/A	
2019	276,579	68,220	2,887,965	
2020	Cancelled due to COVID-19 pandemic			
2021	2,284,012	514,618	29,461,866	
2022	2,800,606	477,042	35,181,778	
2023	3,650,305	659,399	40,552,979	
Mid Season Cup
2024	2,382,990	406,641	29,142,536	
2025	3,069,302	599,873	50,339,328	
2026	2,888,884 (Note: This was the ONIC Esports vs. Team Falcons PH match for third place. The grand finals between Team Spirit vs. Yangon Galacticos only reached an 1.8 million peak.)	511,356	45,212,422	

== Participants ==
=== MSC 2025 ===
Group stage				Ref.
Group A		Group B		Ref.
Team	Seed	Team	Seed	Ref.
(Indonesia) ONIC Esports	MPL ID S15 winner	(Russia) Team Spirit	MCC S5 winner	
(Cambodia) CFU Gaming	MPL KH S8 winner	(Turkey) Aurora Türkiye	MTC S5 winner	
(Brazil) Corinthians	MPL LATAM S3 winner	(Singapore) Team Flash	MPL SG S9 winner	
(Egypt) Ultra Legends	MPL MENA S7 winner	(United States) Area 77	NACT Spring 2025 runner-up	
(Malaysia) SRG.OG	MPL MY S15 winner	(Indonesia) RRQ Hoshi	MPL ID S15 runner-up	
(Philippines) Team Liquid PH	MPL PH S15 winner	(Malaysia) HomeBois	MPL MY S15 runner-up	
(Myanmar) Mythic SEAL	MSL MM S1 winner	ONIC Philippines	MPL PH S15 runner-up	
(Russia) Virtus.pro	Wildcard stage winner	(China) DianFengYaoGuai	China qualifier winner	
Wildcard stage				
Group A		Group B		
Team	Seed	Team	Seed	
(Vietnam) Legion Esports	VMC Spring 2025 winner	(Laos) Niightmare Esports	MCCM S5 winner	
(Saudi Arabia) Team Falcons	MPL MENA S7 runner-up	(Russia) Virtus.pro	MCC S5 runner-up	
(Mongolia) The MongolZ	Mongolia qualifier winner	(Argentina) Influence Rage	MPL LATAM S3 runner-up	
(China) Rare Atom	China qualifier runner-up	(Japan) Zeta Division	Japan qualifier winner	

Notes

1. For documentary purpose only, according to their majority of players, teams from CIS region: Team Spirit based in Serbia and Virtus.pro based in Armenia, both will represent Russia.
2. For documentary purpose only, according to their base of operations, team from North America region: Area 77 will represent the United States.
3. NACT Spring 2025 winner BloodThirstyKing, then signed by Indian esports organization S8UL Esports, was unable to participate due to failing to meet the tournament's minimum roster requirements after two of their players were disqualified for breaching official tournament rules. NACT Spring 2025 runner-up Area 77 was selected to replace their slot by the tournament committee.

== Results ==
=== Top four results ===
Edition	Year	Hosts	Grand final			Third place	Fourth place	No. of teams
Edition	Year	Hosts	Champions	Score	Runners-up	Third place	Fourth place	No. of teams
Southeast Asia Cup
1	2017	Indonesia	(Thailand); IDONOTSLEEP	3–0	(Philippines); Salty Salad	(Philippines); Solid Gaming Alpha	(Singapore); Impunity	8
2	2018	Indonesia	(Philippines); Aether Main	3–0	(Philippines); Digital Devils Pro Gaming	(Indonesia); RRQ.O2	(Indonesia); Aerowolf Roxy	10
3	2019	Philippines	(Indonesia); ONIC Esports	3–0	(Indonesia); Louvre Esports	(Philippines); ArkAngel	(Vietnam); OverClockers	12
2020		Cancelled because of COVID-19 pandemic						
4	2021	None (Note: Online tournament.)	(Philippines); Execration	4–1 (Note: Since 2021, the grand final would be held in best-of-seven (BO7) series format.)	(Philippines); Blacklist International	(Indonesia); EVOS Legends	RSG Malaysia	12
5	2022	Malaysia	RSG Philippines	4–0	(Indonesia); RRQ Hoshi	(Philippines); Omega Esports	(Myanmar); Falcon Esports	12
6	2023	Cambodia	(Indonesia); ONIC Esports	4–2	(Philippines); Blacklist International	ECHO Philippines	(Cambodia); BURN x FLASH	12
Mid Season Cup
7	2024	Saudi Arabia	(Malaysia); Selangor Red Giants	4–3	(Philippines); Falcons AP Bren	(Philippines) Liquid ECHO and (Singapore) NIP Flash (Note: For MSC 2024, the third-place match was not held. Semi-finalists are listed in alphabetical order.)		23
8	2025	Saudi Arabia	(Philippines); Team Liquid PH	4–1	(Malaysia); Selangor Red Giants	ONIC Philippines	(Indonesia); ONIC Esports	23
9	2026	France	Team Spirit	4-3	Yangon Galacticos	ONIC Esports	Team Falcons PH	25

=== Performances by teams ===
Legend

- 1st – Champions
- 2nd – Runners-up
- 3rd – Third place
- 4th – Fourth place
- SF – Semi-finals
- PO – Playoffs
- PI – Play-in
- GS – Group stage
- WC – Wildcard stage
- Q – Qualified
- • – Did not qualify
- × – Did not enter / withdrew
- – Nation hosts

Teams reaching the Top Four by tournament
Team (23)	(Indonesia) 2017	(Indonesia) 2018	(Philippines) 2019	(ASEAN) 2021	(Malaysia) 2022	(Cambodia) 2023	(Saudi Arabia) 2024	(Saudi Arabia) 2025	(France) 2026	Times entered	Times qualified	Top Four total
(Indonesia) ONIC Esports^{1}	×	×	1st	•	GS	1st	GS	4th	3rd	6	5	3
(Philippines) AP Bren^{2}	×	1st	PO	•	•	•	2nd	•	•	7	3	2
(Philippines) Omega Esports^{3}	×	×	•	1st^{[a]}	3rd	•	•	•	•	6	2	2
(Malaysia) SRG.OG^{4}	×	×	×	×	×	•	1st	2nd	GS	3	2	2
(Philippines) Team Liquid PH^{8}	×	×	×	•	•	3rd	SF	1st	GS	5	3	3
(Thailand) IDONOTSLEEP	1st	GS	PO	PI	GS	•	×	×	×	6	5	1
RSG Philippines	×	×	×	×	1st	•	•	×	×	3	1	1
(Serbia) (Russia) Team Spirit	×	×	×	×	×	×	GS	PO	1st	3	3	1
(Philippines) Blacklist International^{5}	×	×	•	2nd	•	2nd	•	×	×	5	2	2
(Indonesia) RRQ Hoshi^{6}	×	3rd	•	•	2nd	•	•	PO	•	7	3	2
(Philippines) Salty Salad	2nd	×	×	×	×	×	×	×	×	1	1	1
(Philippines) Cignal Ultra^{7}	×	2nd	•	•	×	×	×	×	×	3	1	1
(Indonesia) Louvre Esports	×	•	2nd	×	×	×	×	×	×	2	1	1
(Myanmar) Yangon Galacticos	×	×	×	×	×	×	×	×	2nd	1	1	1
(Indonesia) EVOS Esports^{9}	×	GS	•	3rd	•	PO	GS	•	•	7	4	1
ONIC Philippines	×	×	×	•	•	•	•	3rd	•	5	1	1
(Philippines) Solid Gaming Alpha	3rd	×	×	×	×	×	×	×	×	1	1	1
(Philippines) ArkAngel	×	×	3rd	•	×	×	×	×	×	2	1	1
(Singapore) Team Flash^{10}	×	×	×	×	•	•	SF	GS	•	4	2	1
(Singapore) EVOS SG^{11}	4th	×	PO	PO	PO	×	×	×	×	4	1	1
(Myanmar) Falcon Esports^{12}	×	×	×	×	4th	GS^{[b]}	PO	•	•	4	3	1
(Indonesia) Aerowolf Pro Team^{13}	×	4th	•	•	×	×	×	×	×	3	1	1
(Vietnam) Cerberus Esports^{14}	×	×	4th	×	×	×	×	•	×	2	1	1
RSG Malaysia	×	×	×	4th	•	•	•	×	×	4	1	1
(Cambodia) Team Flash KH^{15}	×	×	×	×	•	4th	•	•	×	4	1	1
Team (23)	(Indonesia) 2017	(Indonesia) 2018	(Philippines) 2019	(ASEAN) 2021	(Malaysia) 2022	(Cambodia) 2023	(Saudi Arabia) 2024	(Saudi Arabia) 2025	(France) 2026	Times entered	Times qualified	Top Four total

Notes
Italics denote teams that are no longer active, have disbanded, or whose organizations have ceased to exist.
1. Includes result playing as Fnatic ONIC during 2024.
2. Includes result playing as Aether Main during 2018 and Bren Esports during 2019–2023.
3. Includes result playing as Execration during 2019–2021.
4. Includes result playing as Selangor Red Giants during 2024.
5. Includes result playing as EVOS Esports PH during 2019.
6. Includes result playing as RRQ.O2 during 2018 and PSG.RRQ during 2019.
7. Includes result playing as Digital Devils Pro Gaming during 2018.
8. Includes result playing as ECHO Philippines during 2023.
9. Includes result playing as EVOS Legends during 2021–2023 and EVOS Glory during 2024.
10. Includes result playing as NIP Flash during 2024.
11. Includes result playing as Impunity during 2017.
12. Includes result playing as Fenix Esports during 2023.
13. Includes result playing as Aerowolf Roxy during 2018–2019.
14. Includes result playing as OverClockers during 2019.
15. Includes result playing as BURN x FLASH during 2022–2023.
[a]. For MSC 2021, Omega Esports did not qualify. Omega Esports acquired the roster of Execration on 12 July 2021.
[b]. For MSC 2023, Falcon Esports did not qualify. Falcon Esports acquired the roster of Fenix Esports on 10 July 2023.

=== Performances by nations ===
Legend

- 1st – Champions
- 2nd – Runners-up
- 3rd – Third place
- 4th – Fourth place
- SF – Semi-finals
- PO – Playoffs
- PI – Play-in
- GS – Group stage
- WC – Wildcard stage
- Q – Qualified
- • – Did not qualify
- × – Did not enter / eligible
- – Hosts

==== Number of participating teams by nation ====
Nation (21)	(Indonesia) 2017 (8)	(Indonesia) 2018 (10)	(Philippines) 2019 (12)	(ASEAN) 2021 (12)	(Malaysia) 2022 (12)	(Cambodia) 2023 (12)	(Saudi Arabia) 2024 (23)	(Saudi Arabia) 2025 (23)	(France) 2026 (25)	Total
Indonesia	2	3	2	2	2	2	2	2	2	19
Philippines	2	2	2	2	2	2	2	2	2	18
Malaysia	2	1	1	2	2	1	2	2	2	15
Singapore	1	1	1	2	2	1	1	1	1	11
Cambodia	×	×	1	1	2	1	1	1	1	8
Myanmar	×	1	2	×	1	1	1	1	1	8
Russia	×	×	×	×	×	×	2	2	2	6
Thailand	1	1	1	1	1	•	•	•	1	6
Turkey	×	×	×	×	×	1	2	1	2	6
China	×	×	×	×	×	×	2	2	1	5
Laos	×	×	1	1	•	1	•	1	1	5
Saudi Arabia	×	×	×	×	×	•	2	1	2	5
Vietnam	×	1	1	1	•	•	1	1	•	5
Mongolia	×	×	×	×	×	×	1	1	2	4
United States	×	×	×	×	×	1	1	1	1	4
Brazil	×	×	×	×	×	×	1	1	•	2
Egypt	×	×	×	×	×	1	•	1	•	2
Japan	×	×	×	×	×	×	×	1	1	2
Peru	×	×	×	×	×	×	1	•	1	2
Nepal	×	×	×	×	×	×	1	×	•	1
Argentina	×	×	×	×	×	×	•	1	•	1
Nation (21)	(8) (Indonesia) 2017	(10) (Indonesia) 2018	(12) (Philippines) 2019	(12) (ASEAN) 2021	(12) (Malaysia) 2022	(12) (Cambodia) 2023	(23) (Saudi Arabia) 2024	(23) (Saudi Arabia) 2025	(25) (France) 2026	Total

==== Team nations best result by tournament ====
Team nations' best result Champions Runner-up Third place Semi-finals Fourth place Playoffs Play-in Group stage Wildcard stage

Nation (21)	(Indonesia) 2017	(Indonesia) 2018	(Philippines) 2019	(ASEAN) 2021	(Malaysia) 2022	(Cambodia) 2023	(Saudi Arabia) 2024	(Saudi Arabia) 2025	(France) 2026	Times entered	Times qualified	Top Four total
Philippines	2nd	1st	3rd	1st	1st	2nd	2nd	1st	4th	9	9	9
Indonesia	PO^{[a]}	3rd	1st	3rd	2nd	1st	GS	4th	3rd	9	9	6
Malaysia	PO^{[a]}	GS	PO	4th	PO	PO	1st	2nd	PO (Note: Team Vamos finished in the quarterfinals.)	9	9	3
Russia	×	×	×	×	×	×	GS	PO	1st	3	2	1
Thailand	1st	GS	PO	PI	GS	•	•	•	WC	6	5	1
Singapore	4th	GS	PO	PO	PO	PO	SF	GS	GS	9	9	2
Myanmar	×	GS	PI	×	4th	GS	PO	PO	2nd	7	7	1
Cambodia	×	×	PI	PO	GS	4th	PO	GS	PO	7	7	1
Vietnam	×	GS	4th	PI	•	•	WC	WC	•	6	5	1
Turkey	×	×	×	×	×r	PO	PO	PO	PO (Note: Quarterfinals)	4	4	0
Laos	×	×	PI	PI	•	GS	•	WC	WC	7	4	0
United States	×	×	×	×	×	GS	GS	GS	WC	4	3	0
Egypt	×	×	×	×	×	GS	•	GS	•	4	2	0
Brazil	×	×	×	×	×	×	GS	GS	•	3	2	0
China	×	×	×	×	×	×	GS	GS	GS	3	3	0
Saudi Arabia	×	×	×	×	×	•	GS	WC	GS	4	3	0
Mongolia	×	×	×	×	×	×	WC	WC	WC	3	2	0
Peru	×	×	×	×	×	×	WC	•	GS	3	1	0
Nepal	×	×	×	×	×	×	WC	×	•	2	1	0
Argentina	×	×	×	×	×	×	•	WC	•	3	1	0
Japan	×	×	×	×	×	×	×	WC	WC	2	1	0
Nation (21)	(Indonesia) 2017	(Indonesia) 2018	(Philippines) 2019	(ASEAN) 2021	(Malaysia) 2022	(Cambodia) 2023	(Saudi Arabia) 2024	(Saudi Arabia) 2025	(France) 2026	Times entered	Times qualified	Top Four total

Notes
[a]. For MSC 2017, there was no group stage.

==== Team nations that have never qualified ====
Teams from these nations have gone through qualifications that lead to MSC, but failed to qualify.

Nation (12)	(Cambodia) 2023	(Saudi Arabia) 2024	(Saudi Arabia) 2025	Attempts
Brunei	•	•	•	3
UAE	•	•	•	3
Kuwait	•	•	×	2
Bolivia	×	•	•	2
Kazakhstan	×	•	•	2
Iraq	•	×	×	1
Jordan	•	×	×	1
Bangladesh	×	•	×	1
Bhutan	×	•	×	1
Mexico	×	•	×	1
Ukraine	×	•	×	1
Timor-Leste	×	×	•	1
Nation (12)	(Cambodia) 2023	(Saudi Arabia) 2024	(Saudi Arabia) 2025	Attempts

== See also ==
- Mobile Legends: Bang Bang World Championship
- MPL Philippines
- MPL Indonesia
