= EVM Convention Center =

Convention center in Quezon City, Philippines

- Interactive map of EVM Convention Center
- Address: Quezon City, Metro Manila; Philippines
- Coordinates: 14.6627°N 121.0474°E
- Owner: Iglesia ni Cristo
- Capacity: 2,936 (Note: Across 3 halls)
- Type: Convention center

Construction
- Opened: March 15, 2022

The EVM Convention Center is a convention center in Quezon City, Metro Manila, Philippines. It is associated with the Iglesia ni Cristo.

== History ==
The EVM Convention Center was built by the Iglesia ni Cristo (INC), a Philippine-based Christian church. It was among the named projects of the INC for its Centennial celebration on July 27, 2014. An accident occurred at the construction site in February 2013 killing a worker. The facility was not finished in time for the church anniversary.

It was inaugurated on March 15, 2022, with INC Executive Minister Eduardo V. Manalo leading the conduct of the International Conference, for Ministers and Ministerial Workers.

The name of the convention center is based on the initials of the Church's Executive Minister, Eduardo V. Manalo.

== Specifications ==
The building has the following auditoriums:

- Felix Y. Manalo Hall – 2,936 seats
- Eraño G. Manalo Hall – 1,659 seats
- Glicerio B. Santos Jr. Hall – 271 seats

== Events ==
Aside from INC events, the convention center has served as a venue for other notable events such as STAYC's fan meet in the Philippines; the group stage of the Mobile Legends: Bang Bang esports tournament, MLBB M5 World Championship in December 2023 as well as the MPL Philippines's Season 12 playoff.
