= 2019 MLBB Southeast Asia Cup =

Mobile Legends: Bang Bang tournament

MLBB SEA Cup (MSC)
- 2019

Tournament information
- Sport: Mobile Legends: Bang Bang
- Location: Manila, Philippines
- Date: Group Stage; June 19–20, 2019; Playoffs; June 21–23, 2019
- Administrator: Moonton
- Tournament formats: Group Stage; Round robin; Playoffs; Double elimination
- Hosts: Eric Tai; Faraz Shababi; Fiera Fendi; Serahline
- Venue: Smart Araneta Coliseum
- Participants: 12 teams; (See MSC 2019 Participants)

Final positions
- Champions: (Indonesia) ONIC Esports (1st title)
- 1st runner-up: (Indonesia) Louvre Esports
- 2nd runner-up: (Philippines) ArkAngel

MLBB Southeast Asia Cup 2019 (MSC 2019) was the third season of the Mobile Legends: Bang Bang annual SEA tournament MSC. It was held at Smart Araneta Coliseum with a total prize pool of US$120,000 from June 19–23, 2019. The event was hosted by Eruption, Faraz Shababi, Fiera Fendi, and Serahline.

== Background ==
Previous MSC events were hosted at Jakarta, Indonesia with total prize pools of US$100,000. Philippines was the venue after two Filipino teams won 1st and 2nd place at MSC 2018. 12 teams were invited from 9 Southeast Asian countries namely Indonesia, Malaysia, Singapore, Myanmar, the Philippines, Laos, Thailand, Cambodia, and Vietnam.

== Format ==
A total of 12 teams were invited, 2 teams each from Mobile Legends: Bang Bang Professional Leagues (MPL) from Indonesia, Malaysia/Singapore, Myanmar, and the Philippines. One team each for Laos, Thailand, Cambodia, and Vietnam were invited through local qualifiers. The tournaments start with a group stage where teams are selected through best of 3 round round robin. Teams winning the best of 3 get to the upper bracket. The other two teams compete on play-ins where the winning team gets to the lower bracket and the losing team is eliminated. After the group stage is the tournament proper. Losing teams from the upper bracket are demoted to the lower bracket while losing teams from the lower bracket are eliminated. One finalist will come from each bracket and compete in the Grand Finals.

== Results ==
=== Group stage ===
Group A

Team	Advanced to
(Malaysia) Geek Fam	Play-ins
(Philippines) Bren Esports	Play-ins
(Thailand) IDNS	Upper Bracket

Group B

Team	Advanced to
(Singapore) EVOS Esports SG	Play-ins
(Philippines) ArkAngel	Upper Bracket
(Vietnam) Overlockers	Play-ins

Group C

Team	Advanced to
(Myanmar) Team Resolution	Play-ins
(Indonesia) Louvre Esports	Upper Bracket
(Cambodia) Diversity Helheim	Play-ins

Group D

Team	Advanced to
(Indonesia) ONIC Esports	Upper Bracket
(Myanmar) Burmese Ghouls	Play-ins
(Laos) WAWA Gaming	Play-ins

==== Play-ins ====
Play-ins (Bo3)
(Malaysia)	Geek Fam	2
(Cambodia)	Diversity Helheim	0

Play-ins (Bo3)
(Myanmar)	Burmese Ghouls	0
(Singapore)	EVOS Esports SG	2

Play-ins (Bo3)
(Vietnam)	Overlockers	2
(Laos)	WAWA Gaming	0

Play-ins (Bo3)
(Myanmar)	Team Resolution	0
(Philippines)	Bren Esports	2

=== Playoffs ===
All playoff games were a Bo3 series, except for the Grand Final, which were a Bo5 series.

Upper Bracket Semifinals	Upper Bracket Final	Grand Final
(Philippines) ArkAngel	1
(Indonesia) Louvre Esports	2
(Indonesia) Louvre Esports	1
(Indonesia) ONIC Esports	2
(Thailand) IDONOTSLEEP	0
(Indonesia) ONIC Esports	2
(Indonesia) ONIC Esports	3
(Indonesia) Louvre Esports	0
Lower Bracket - Round 1	Lower Bracket Quarterfinals	Lower Bracket Semifinals	Lower Bracket Final
(Philippines) ArkAngel	2
(Malaysia) Geek Fam	0	EVOS Singapore	0	(Indonesia) Louvre Esports	2
EVOS Singapore	2	(Philippines) ArkAngel	2	(Philippines) ArkAngel	0
(Vietnam) The Overclockers	1
(Thailand) IDONOTSLEEP	1
(Vietnam) The Overclockers	2	(Vietnam) The Overclockers	2
(Philippines) Bren Esports	0

== Viewership ==
MSC 2019 was streamed live on YouTube, Facebook Gaming, and Nimo TV. Facebook Gaming is the livestream partner.

Peak Viewers	Average Viewers	Hours Watched	Air Time
276,579	64,552	2,802,625	44

== MSC 2020 ==
MSC 2020, the next season succeeding MSC 2019, was set again to take place in the Philippines at the Mall of Asia Arena with the prize pool increased to US$150,000. On May 11, Moonton announced the cancellation of the event via their official Mobile Legends Indonesia Instagram account due to Coronavirus disease 2019.
