= 2021 MLBB Southeast Asia Cup =

Mobile Legends: Bang Bang tournament

MLBB Southeast Asia Cup 2021
- 2021

Tournament information
- Sport: Mobile Legends: Bang Bang
- Date: Group Stage; June 7–8, 2021; Playoffs; June 11–13, 2021
- Administrator: Moonton
- Tournament formats: Group Stage; Round robin; Playoffs; Double elimination
- Venue: None
- Participants: 12 teams; (See MSC 2021 Participants)

Final positions
- Champion: (Philippines) Execration (1st title)
- 2nd place: (Philippines) Blacklist International
- 3rd place: (Indonesia) EVOS Legends

Tournament statistics
- MVP: (Philippines) Kelra (Execration)
- Highest KDA: Syno (RSG Malaysia)
- Highest Kills: (Philippines) Kelra (Execration)
- Highest Assists: (Philippines) Ch4knu (Execration)

The Mobile Legends: Bang Bang Southeast Asia Cup 2021, commonly known as MSC 2021, was the fourth annual regional Southeast Asia tournament for Mobile Legends: Bang Bang organized by Moonton. Due to the COVID-19 pandemic, MSC 2021 was held virtually via an online livestream. With a total prize pool of $150,000 after Moonton's announcement of a prize pool increase, the games were held from 7–13 June 2021. The Philippine team of Execration won the Tournament against another Philippine team in Blacklist International with Kelra as the winning MVP. This is the second title that the Philippines have won after Aether Main won the MSC Cup in 2018.

== Background ==
Previous MSC tournaments were held in Face-to-face and public viewing on public venues in 2017, 2018 and 2019. However, with the Pandemic circulating worldwide, this is the first tournament to be featured online via livestream. Then-current SEA Cup Champions ONIC Esports were the longest champions in MSC History after the 2020 MSC Tournament was cancelled on May 11 by Moonton because of the pandemic. MSC 2021 would push through to continue with the prize pool being increased from $120,000 to $150,000.

== Format ==
Twelve teams across Southeast Asia were qualified for the tournament. The MPL regions in Malaysia, Indonesia, Singapore and the Philippines had their respective Champion and Runner-ups represent their regions, while the non-MPL teams in Cambodia, Laos, Thailand, and Vietnam were directly invited.

- Teams are grouped into four groups of three teams each.
- Group Stage: (June 7–9th, 2021)
  - Teams play in a single round-robin, facing each other in a Bo3 format.
  - At the end of the group stage, the top team in each group qualified for the Upper Bracket Semifinals.
  - The next two teams in each group proceeded in the play-ins, also in a Bo3 format. The winner of that series moved on to the Lower Bracket Playoffs, while the loser was eliminated.
- Playoffs: (June 11–13th, 2021)
  - Lower Bracket Rounds 1–2, Semifinals and the Upper Bracket Semifinals were in a Bo3 format.
  - The Upper and Lower Bracket Finals were in a Bo5 format.
  - The Grand Finals was a Bo7 format.

== Teams Participating ==
Qualified teams for MSC 2021
Nation	League	Qualification method	Date	Team
Philippines	MPL Philippines	MPL Philippines Season 7 Champions	19 March – 30 May 2021	(Philippines) Blacklist International
Philippines	MPL Philippines	MPL Philippines Season 7 Runner-up	19 March – 30 May 2021	(Philippines) Execration
Indonesia	MPL Indonesia	MPL Indonesia Season 7 Champions	26 February – 2 May 2021	(Indonesia) EVOS Legends
Indonesia	MPL Indonesia	MPL Indonesia Season 7 Runner-up	26 February – 2 May 2021	(Indonesia) Bigetron Alpha
Malaysia	MPL Malaysia	MPL Malaysia Season 7 Champions	12 March – 30 May 2021	RSG Malaysia
Malaysia	MPL Malaysia	MPL Malaysia Season 7 Runner-up	12 March – 30 May 2021	(Malaysia) TODAK
Singapore	MPL Singapore	MPL Singapore Season 1 Champions	26 February – 2 May 2021	(Singapore) EVOS SG
Singapore	MPL Singapore	MPL Singapore Season 1 Runner-up	26 February – 2 May 2021	RSG Singapore
Thailand	—	Direct invitation	—	(Thailand) IDNOTSLEEP (IDNS)
Cambodia	—	Direct invitation	—	(Cambodia) KH Impunity
Laos	—	Direct invitation	—	(Laos) Nightmare Esports
Vietnam	—	Direct invitation	—	(Vietnam) Cyber EXE

== Group Stage ==
All matches in the group stages were a best-of-three series, all playing in a single round-robin. The group winner qualified for the Upper Bracket Semifinals, while the bottom two teams per group qualified for the play-ins stage.

=== Group A ===
Pos	Team	Pld	W	L	PF	PA	PD	Pts	Qualification
1	RSG Malaysia	2	2	0	4	0	+4	4	Qualified for the Upper Bracket Semifinals
2	RSG Singapore	2	1	1	2	2	0	3	Qualified for the Play-ins
3	(Thailand) IDNS	2	0	2	0	4	−4	2	Qualified for the Play-ins

=== Group B ===
Pos	Team	Pld	W	L	PF	PA	PD	Pts	Qualification
1	(Indonesia) EVOS Legends	2	2	0	4	0	+4	4	Qualified for the Upper Bracket Semifinals
2	(Malaysia) Todak	2	1	1	2	2	0	3	Qualified for the Play-ins
3	(Vietnam) Cyber EXE	2	0	2	0	4	−4	2	Qualified for the Play-ins

=== Group C ===
Pos	Team	Pld	W	L	PF	PA	PD	Pts	Qualification
1	(Philippines) Blacklist International	2	2	0	4	0	+4	4	Qualified for the Upper Bracket Semifinals
2	(Indonesia) Bigetron Alpha	2	1	1	2	2	0	3	Qualified for the Play-ins
3	(Cambodia) KH Impunity	2	0	2	0	4	−4	2	Qualified for the Play-ins

=== Group D ===
Pos	Team	Pld	W	L	PF	PA	PD	Pts	Qualification
1	(Philippines) Execration	2	2	0	4	0	+4	4	Qualified for the Upper Bracket Semifinals
2	EVOS Singapore	2	1	1	2	2	0	3	Qualified for the Play-ins
3	(Laos) Nightmare Esports	2	0	2	0	4	−4	2	Qualified for the Play-ins

== Play-ins Stage ==
Bottom two teams in each group competed for a spot in the lower brackets through the play-ins stage, with the winner advancing to the playoffs, while the losers being eliminated. All matches were a best-of-three series.

Play-ins
(Indonesia) Bigetron Alpha	2
RSG Singapore	0

Play-ins
(Thailand) IDNS	1
(Cambodia) KH Impunity	2

Play-ins
(Malaysia) Todak	2
(Laos) Nightmare Esports	0

Play-ins
(Vietnam) Cyber EXE	0
EVOS Singapore	2

== Playoffs ==
All matches were a Bo3 series, except for the Upper and Lower Bracket Finals which were a Bo5 series, and the Grand Finals which was a Bo7 series.

Upper Bracket Semifinals	Upper Bracket Final	Grand Final
RSG Malaysia	0
(Philippines) Blacklist International	2
(Philippines) Blacklist International	3
(Indonesia) EVOS Legends	0
(Indonesia) EVOS Legends	2
(Philippines) Execration	1
(Philippines) Blacklist International	1
(Philippines) Execration	4
Lower Bracket - Round 1	Lower Bracket Quarterfinals	Lower Bracket Semifinals	Lower Bracket Final
RSG Malaysia	2
(Indonesia) Bigetron Alpha	2	(Indonesia) Bigetron Alpha	1	(Indonesia) EVOS Legends	1
(Malaysia) TODAK	0	RSG Malaysia	0	(Philippines) Execration	3
(Philippines) Execration	2
(Philippines) Execration	2
(Cambodia) KH Impunity	2	(Cambodia) KH Impunity	1
EVOS Singapore	0

With the win of Execration in the Grand Finals, the Philippines obtained its second MSC Cup in 2 years after Aether Main in 2018. This was the second time in MSC History wherein two teams from the same nation went head-to-head in the Grand Finals, the first was in 2019 when ONIC Esports and Louvre Esports faced off each other in the Finals. Both teams are from Indonesia.

== Viewership ==
MSC 2021 was streamed online for a widespread reach and due to the COVID-19 pandemic MSC was forced to be hosted digitally. MSC 2021 recorded a record high of viewership, average viewership, and Hours Watched in MSC history. The tournaments were live steamed on YouTube, Facebook Gaming and NimoTV alongside TikTok and VK Live.

Peaker Viewers	Average Viewers	Hours Watched	Reference
2,284,012	514,618	29,461,886	

High turnouts of viewership were from the teams competing in the competition. EVOS Esports of Indonesia has average viewers of over 986,314, followed by Execration, Blacklist International, Bigetron and RSG MY. EVOS, Execration, Blacklist have record high of viewership of over 500,000 viewers.
