= 2023 MPL Philippines season =

- League: MPL Philippines
- Sport: Mobile Legends: Bang Bang
- Duration: 17 February – 7 May 2023 (Season 11); 8 September – 29 October 2023 (Season 12)
- Number of teams: 8

Season 11
- Season champions: ECHO Philippines
- Runners-up: Blacklist International
- Top seed: Bren Esports
- Season MVP: Rowgien "Owgwen" Unigo (Bren Esports)

Season 12
- Season champions: AP Bren
- Runners-up: Blacklist International
- Top seed: ECHO Philippines
- Season MVP: Karl "KarlTzy" Nepomuceno (ECHO Philippines)

MPL Philippines seasons
- ← 2022 2024 →

The 2023 MPL Philippines season was the sixth year of professional Esports competitions for the Mobile Legends: Bang Bang Professional League of the Philippines (referred to as: MPL Philippines). The 2023 season features two seasonal splits: MPL Philippines Season 11 and MPL Philippines Season 12. It was during this year that the inaugural Mobile Legends: Bang Bang Development League was introduced to the Philippines with MDL Philippines Season 1 occurring as the preceding event prior to MPL Philippines Season 11.

MPL Philippines Season 11 was the first season for the year 2023 and was the first professional season for the league after the MLBB M4 World Championships. Defending champions Blacklist International were beaten by the M4 World Champions ECHO Philippines during the Season 11 Grand Finals and was the first sweep by a team in the Finals since Season 1 between Aether Main and Digital Devils Pro Team. ECHO and Blacklist would qualify as the two teams of the Philippines to the Mobile Legends: Bang Bang Southeast Asia Cup (MSC 2023) in Cambodia. Blacklist International would boast the best performance by a Filipino team in the aforementioned competition as the team loss 4–2 to Indonesian team ONIC Esports with two Filipino imports in Kairi Rayosdelsol and Yeb Miranda. ECHO Philippines finished in third place, defeating home-team BURN x FLASH, 3–2.

MPL Philippines Season 12 began in September 2023, 4 months after the Grand Finals match of MPL Philippines Season 11. Season 12 was the qualifying tournament for the Philippines to the MLBB M5 World Championships that will be played on home soil. Defending world champions and MPL champions ECHO Philippines failed to defend their world title and MPL title after losing to Blacklist International, who has included the services of Renejay "Renejay" Barcase to the roster, 3–1 in the Lower Bracket Finals to qualify for M5. Blacklist International is the only team in the Philippines to qualify for three-consecutive world championship series, appearing since the M3 World Championship which the team won. AP Bren would defeat Blacklist International in the Grand Finals 4–1 to give the organization its second MPL title. Furthermore, AP Bren would win the M5 World Championships on home soil as they defeat Indonesia's ONIC Esports 4–3 in the Grand Finals, making them the only organization thus far to win two world championships.

During the 2023 season, Filipino teams have won one M-World Series titles and one MPLI Invitational titles with RSG Philippines defeating ECHO in an all-Filipino Grand Finals.

== Season 11 ==
MPL Philippines Season 11
- 2023

Tournament information
- Game: Mobile Legends: Bang Bang
- Location: Philippines
- Dates: February 17–May 7, 2023
- Administrator: Moonton
- Tournament format(s): Double round-robin (Regular season); Double-elimination (Playoffs)
- Teams: 8

Final positions
- Champions: ECHO Philippines (1st title)
- 1st runners-up: Blacklist International
- 2nd runners-up: RSG Philippines
- MVP: Rowgien "Owgwen" Unigo (Bren Esports)

=== Participating teams ===
MPL Philippines Season 11 features the same eight (8) franchise teams that have previously competed during MPL Philippines Season 10.

- Bren Esports
  - HC - Francis "Ducky" Glindro
  - AC - Vrendon "Vren" Lim
  - Pos 1 - Kyle "KyleTzy" Sayson
  - Pos 2 - Marco "Super Marco" Requitiano
  - Pos 3 - Angelo "Pheww" Arcangel
  - Pos 4 - David "FlapTzy" Canon
  - Pos 5 - Rowgien "Owgwen" Unigo
- Substitute(s):
  - Pos 4 - Vincent "Pandora" Unigo
- Blacklist International
  - HC - Aniel "Master the Basics" Jiandani
  - AC - Dexter "Dex Star" Alaba
  - Pos 1 - Danerie James "Wise" Del Rosario
  - Pos 2 - Lee "Owl" Gonzales
  - Pos 3 - Kenneth "Yue" Tadeo
  - Pos 4 - Edward "Edward" Dapadap
  - Pos 5 - Johnmar "OhMyV33Nus" Villaluna
- Substitute(s):
  - Pos 4 - Renejay "RENEJAY" Barcase
  - Pos 2 - Red "Super Red" Bordeos
- ECHO Philippines
  - HC - Harrold "Tictac" Reyes
  - AC - Robert "Trebor" Sanchez
  - Pos 1 - Karl "KarlTzy" Nepomuceno
  - Pos 2 - Frederic "Bennyqt" Gonzales
  - Pos 3 - Alston "Sanji" Pabico
  - Pos 4 - Sanford "Sanford" Vinuya
  - Pos 5 - Tristan "Yawi" Cabrera
- Substitute(s):
  - None
- Nexplay EVOS
  - HC - Joshua "Joshy" Alfaro
  - AC - Jayson "Isonn" Casidsid
  - Pos 1 - Bien "BoyetDR" Chumecera
  - Pos 2 - Jan "DomengDR" Delmundo
  - Pos 3 - Christian "GoyongDR" Martinez
  - Pos 4 - Danver "DingDR" Canja
  - Pos 5 - Borris "BruskoDR" Parro
- Substitute(s):
  - Pos 3 - Jeniel "YellyHazeDR" Bata-Anon
- Smart Omega
  - HC - Anthony "YnoT" Senedrin
  - AC - Jomie "P4kbet" Abalos
  - TC - Patrick "E2MAX" Caidic
  - Pos 1 - Dean "Raizen" Sumagui
  - Pos 2 - Grant "Kelra" Pillas
  - Pos 3 - Dale "Stowm" Vidor
  - Pos 4 - Renz "Renzio" Cadua
  - Pos 5 - Deonmark "Mikko" Tabangay
- Substitute(s):
  - Pos 4 - Louis "Louis" Ariola
- ONIC Philippines
  - HC - Mark "Bluffzy" Reyes
  - AC - Hendrich "Lyrick" Clahi
  - Pos 1 - Stephen "Sensui" Castillo
  - Pos 2 - Kenneth "Nets" Barro
  - Pos 3 - Frince "Frinceee" Ramirez
  - Pos 4 - Nowee "Ryota" Macasa
  - Pos 5 - Jefferdson "Kekedoot" Mogol
- Substitute(s):
  - Pos 4 - Landher "Der" San Gabriel
  - Pos 5 - Archie "Pancake" Guevarra Jr.
  - Pos 4 - David "BOSS A" Gamboa
- RSG Slate Philippines
  - HC - Brian "Panda" Chang-rok
  - AC - John "Theo" Eusebio
  - Pos 1 - John "Irrad" Abarquez
  - Pos 2 - Eman "EMANN" Sangco
  - Pos 3 - Dexter "Exort" Martinez
  - Pos 4 - Nathanael "Nathzz" Estrologo
  - Pos 5 - Dylan "Light" Catipon
- Substitute(s):
  - Pos 1 - John "H2wo" Salonga
  - Pos 2 - Salvick "Kouzen" Tolarba
- TNC Pro Team
  - HC - John Laurence "Lift" Ruiz
  - AC - Jemson "Scholar" Ignacio
  - Pos 1 - King "K1NGKONG" Perez
  - Pos 2 - John "Innocent" Banal
  - Pos 3 - Jomearie "Escalera" Santos
  - Pos 4 - Kristofer "Hesu" Calderon
  - Pos 5 - Ben "Benthings" Maglaque
- Substitute(s):
  - Pos 1 - Kenneth "Saxa" Fedelin
  - Pos 2 - Robee "Ninjakilla" Pormocille
  - Pos 3 - Jetson "Goyo" Ignacio
  - Pos 4 - Mark "Kramm" Rusiana
  - Pos 5 - Jayson "Riku" Alupit

=== Regular season ===
==== Format ====
All participating teams will participate in a double round-robin tournament format in the eight-week duration of MPL Philippines Season 11. Every team will play a Bo3 match against each other with a total of fourteen games being played per team. A pointing system will be followed for teams to be properly seeded coming into the playoffs.

- If a team wins a series 2–0, the winning team will receive 3 points and the losing team will receive 0 points.
- If a team wins a series 2–1, the winning team will receive 2 points and the losing team will receive 1 point.

==== Standings ====
Pos	Team	Pld	W	L	GF	GA	GD	Pts	Qualification
1	Bren Esports (Q)	14	11	3	23	9	+14	31	Qualified for the Upper-Bracket Semifinals
2	ECHO Philippines (Q)	14	11	3	23	11	+12	29	Qualified for the Upper-Bracket Semifinals
3	Blacklist International (Q)	14	8	6	18	14	+4	24	Qualified for the Play-in
4	RSG Slate Philippines (Q)	14	7	7	17	16	+1	22	Qualified for the Play-in
5	ONIC Philippines (Q)	14	6	8	16	19	−3	19	Qualified for the Play-in
6	Omega Esports (Q)	14	6	8	15	19	−4	18	Qualified for the Play-in
7	Nexplay EVOS (E)	14	4	10	13	22	−9	15	Eliminated from Playoff Contention
8	TNC Pro Team (E)	14	3	11	8	23	−15	10	Eliminated from Playoff Contention

Updated to match(es) played on 14 April 2024. Source: https://ph-mpl.com/
(E) Eliminated; (Q) Qualified for the phase indicated

==== Head-to-head ====
Home \ Away	APBRN	BLCK	ECHO	NXPE	OMG	ONIC	RSG	TNC
Bren Esports	—	4–0 (2-0, 2-0)	2–3 (2-1, 0-2)	4–1 (2-1, 2-0)	4–1 (2-1, 2-0)	2–2 (2-0, 0-2)	4–0 (2-0, 2-0)	3–2 (2-0, 1-2)
Blacklist International	0–4 (0-2, 0-2)	—	1–4 (0-2, 1-2)	3–2 (1-2, 2-0)	4–0 (2-0, 2-0)	4–2 (2-1, 2-1)	2–2 (2-0, 0-2)	4–0 (2-0, 2-0)
ECHO Philippines	3–2 (2-0, 1-2)	4–1 (2-1, 2-0)	—	4–1 (2-0, 2-1)	4–1 (2-1, 2-0)	4–1 (2-0, 2-1)	2–3 (2-1, 0-2)	2–2 (0-2, 2-0)
NXPE	1–4 (1-2, 0-2)	2–3 (0-2, 2-1)	1–4 (1-2, 0-2)	—	3–2 (2-0, 1-2)	1–4 (0-2, 1-2)	1–4 (1-2, 0-2)	4–1 (2-0, 2-1)
Omega Esports	1–4 (0-2, 1-2)	0–4 (0-2, 0-2)	1–4 (0-2, 1-2)	2–3 (2-1, 0-2)	—	3–3 (2-1, 1-2)	4–1 (2-0, 2-1)	4–0 (2-0, 2-0)
ONIC Philippines	2–2 (2-0, 0-2)	2–4 (1-2, 1-2)	1–4 (1-2, 0-2)	4–1 (2-0, 2-1)	3–3 (2-1, 1-2)	—	2–3 (2-1, 0-2)	2–2 (2-0, 0-2)
RSG Philippines	0–4 (0-2, 0-2)	2–2 (2-0, 0-2)	3–2 (2-0, 1-2)	4–1 (2-0, 2-1)	1–4 (1-2, 0-2)	3–2 (2-0, 1-2)	—	4–1 (2-0, 2-1)
TNC Pro Team	2–3 (2-1, 0-2)	0–4 (0-2, 0-2)	2–2 (0-2, 2-0)	1–4 (0-2, 1-2)	0–4 (0-2, 0-2)	2–2 (2-0, 0-2)	1–4 (1-2, 0-2)	—

Updated to match(es) played on unknown. Source:
Legend: Blue = home team win; Yellow = draw; Red = away team win.

The head-to-head matches between the eight teams have been accumulated together counting the number of wins each team has won in their face-to-face match. (Bren Esports' 4–0 record over Blacklist International denotes that in the two matches that both teams have faced off against each other, AP Bren has won 4 matches and lost 0 to Blacklist).

==== Playoff bracket ====
Play-in Round
3	Blacklist Int.	3
6	Smart Omega	0
4	RSG Slate Philippines	3
5	ONIC Philippines	0

Upper Bracket Semifinals
1	Bren Esports	1
3	Blacklist Int.	3
2	ECHO Philippines	2
3	RSG Slate Philippines	3
Lower Bracket Knockouts
1	Bren Esports	1
3	ECHO Philippines	3

Upper Bracket Finals
3	Blacklist Int.	3
4	RSG Slate Philippines	1
Lower Bracket Finals
4	RSG Slate Philippines	2
3	ECHO Philippines	3

Grand Finals
3	Blacklist Int.	0
2	ECHO Philippines	4

MPL Philippines Season 11 was ECHO Philippines' first MPL title since the team rebranded from SunSparks to AURA Philippines to simply ECHO Philippines. This is also the first season where the defending champions were defeated in their attempt of a back-to-back campaign.

==== Final standings ====
Position	Winnings	Qualification	Team
Champions	$45,060	MSC 2023	ECHO Philippines
1st Runner Up	$28,560	MSC 2023	Blacklist International
2nd Runner Up	$17,660	–	RSG Slate Philippines
3rd Runner Up	$15,660	–	Bren Esports
5th-6th	$9,560	–	ONIC Philippines
5th-6th	$9,260	–	Omega Esports
7th	$5,860	–	Minana EVOS
8th	$4,360	–	TNC Pro Team

== Season 12 ==
MPL Philippines Season 12 was the succeeding professional season following MSC 2023. Season 12's regular season began on 8 September and concluded with the Grand Finals on 29 October 2023. Similar to Season 11, the top six teams will advance to the playoff bracket and only the Top 2 teams will qualify for the M5 World Championships held in home soil. The Grand Finals was played at the EVM Convention Center in Quezon City.

=== Roster changes ===
The same Eight Franchises will be participating in Season 12 with roster changes during the off-season and in-season.

Date	IGN	Role	Previous Team	Change	New Team	Role	Ref.
Blacklist International
21 June 2023	Super Red	Gold Laner	Blacklist International	Transfer	Red Selangor Giants (Loan)	Gold Laner	
22 June 2023	Hadess	Jungler	Geek Fam Indonesia	Transfer	Blacklist International (Loan)	Jungler	
3 July 2023	Hadess	Jungler	Blacklist International (Loan)	Transfer	Team Flash SG	Jungler	
10 August 2023	KEVIER	Jungler	Blacklist International (Inactive Player)	Transfer	Blacklist Lunatix	Jungler	
10 August 2023	OhMyV33Nus	Roamer	Blacklist International	Inactivity	Blacklist International (Inactive Player)	Content Creator	
10 August 2023	Wise	Jungler	Blacklist International	Inactivity	Blacklist International (Inactive Player)	Content Creator	
10 August 2023	Hadji	Mid/Roam	Blacklist International (Inactive Player)	Return	Blacklist International	Mid/Roam	
10 August 2023	BON CHAN	Head Coach	Blacklist International (Inactive Player)	Return	Blacklist International	Technical Coach	
10 August 2023	Oheb	Gold Laner	Blacklist Lunatix	Promotion	Blacklist International	Gold Laner	
10 August 2023	Eyon	Mid Laner	Blacklist Lunatix	Promotion	Blacklist International	Mid Laner	
13 August 2023	ESON	Roamer/Substitute	Blacklist International (Inactive Player)	Return	Blacklist Lunatix	Coach	
ECHO Philippines
6 August 2023	Jian	Gold Laner	ECHO Philippines	Departure	None	Gold Laner	
9 August 2023	Jaypee	Roamer	ECHO Proud	Promotion	ECHO Philippines	Roamer	
Minana EVOS
10 August 2023	Entire roster and organization transitions from Nexplay EVOS to Minana EVOS						
Smart Omega / Omega Esports
21 July 2023	Stowm	Mid Lane	Omega Esports	Transfer	RSG Malaysia	Roamer	
28 July 2023	Renzio	Exp-Lane	Omega Esports	Transfer	Team Max	Exp-Lane	
4 August 2023	Raizen	Jungler	Omega Esports	Transfer	ONIC Philippines	Jungler	
5 August 2023	Mikko	Roamer	Omega Esports	Transfer	Team SMG	Roamer	
9 August 2023	Louiis	Exp-Lane	Omega Esports	Demotion	Omega Neos	Exp-Lane	
10 August 2023	Jowm	Gold Lane	Team Lunatix	Transfer	Omega Esports	Gold Lane	
10 August 2023	Spideeey	Gold Lane	None	New Signing	Omega Esports	Gold Lane	
10 August 2023	Ryota	Exp-Lane	ONIC Philippines	Transfer	Omega Esports	Exp-Lane	
10 August 2023	Andoryuuu	Jungler	Omega Neos	Promotion	Omega Esports	Jungler	
10 August 2023	Stronger	Head Coach	None	New Signing	Omega Esports	Head Coach	
10 August 2023	E2MAX	Technical Coach	Omega Esports	Role Transition	Omega Esports	Mid Lane	
10 August 2023	Ch4knu	Roamer	Omega Esports (Inactive Player)	Return	Omega Esports	Roamer	
10 August 2023	Ribo	Multirole	ZOL Esports	New Signing	Omega Esports	Multirole	
11 August 2023	Pakbet	Head Coach	Omega Esports	Transfer	Team Max	Head Coach	
ONIC Philippines
10 June 2023	Lyrick	Assistant Coach	ONIC Philippines	Transfer	Triple Esports	Coach	
10 June 2023	Ryota	Exp-Lane	ONIC Philippines	Transfer	Omega Esports	Exp-Lane	
15 June 2023	Kekedoot	Roamer	ONIC Philippines	Demotion	ONIC Arsenals	Roamer	
17 June 2023	Der	Exp-Lane	ONIC Philippines	Demotion	ONIC Arsenals	Exp-Lane	
19 June 2023	Sensui	Jungler	ONIC Philippines	Transfer	Blacklist International	Jungler	
4 August 2023	Bluffzy	Coach	ONIC Philippines	Role Transition	ONIC Philippines	Head Coach	
RSG Philippines
2 August 2023	Demonkite	Jungler	RSG Philippines	Transfer	RSG Malaysia	Jungler	
27 August 2028	H2wo	Jungler	RSG Philippines	Inactivity	None	Jungler	

=== Regular season ===
==== Format ====
All participating teams will participate in a double round-robin tournament format in the eight-week duration of MPL Philippines Season 11. Every team will play a Bo3 match against each other with a total of fourteen games being played per team. A pointing system will be followed for teams to be properly seeded coming into the playoffs.

- If a team wins a series 2–0, the winning team will receive 3 points and the losing team will receive 0 points.
- If a team wins a series 2–1, the winning team will receive 2 points and the losing team will receive 1 point.

Pos	Team	Pld	W	L	GF	GA	GD	Pts	Qualification
1	ECHO Philippines (Q)	14	11	3	23	10	+13	30	Qualified for the Upper-Bracket Semifinals
2	AP Bren (Q)	14	7	7	18	15	+3	24	Qualified for the Upper-Bracket Semifinals
3	Blacklist International (Q)	14	8	6	17	15	+2	22	Qualified for the Play-in
4	RSG Philippines (Q)	14	7	7	18	17	+1	22	Qualified for the Play-in
5	ONIC Philippines (Q)	14	7	7	16	16	0	21	Qualified for the Play-in
6	Omega Esports (Q)	14	7	7	15	17	−2	19	Qualified for the Play-in
7	Minana EVOS (E)	14	6	8	14	17	−3	19	Eliminated from Playoff Contention
8	TNC Pro Team (E)	14	3	11	9	23	−14	11	Eliminated from Playoff Contention

Updated to match(es) played on 29 October 2023. Source: https://ph-mpl.com/
(E) Eliminated; (Q) Qualified for the phase indicated

==== Head-to-head ====
Home \ Away	ECHO	APBRN	BLCK	RSG	ONIC	OMG	EVOS	TNC
ECHO Philippines	—		4–0 (2-0,2-0)	2–3 (2-1,0-2)	2–2 (2-0,0-2)	2–2 (0-2,2-0)	2–3 (0-2,2-1)	4–1 (2-0,2-1)
AP Bren	2–3 (2-1,0-2)	—	1–4 (1-2,0-2)	1–4 (0-2,1-2)	4–0 (2-0,2-0)	2–4 (1-2,1-2)	4–0 (2-0,2-0)	4–0 (2-0,2-0)
Blacklist International	0–4 (0-2,0-2)	4–1 (2-0,2-1)	—	3–2 (1-2,2-0)	2–2 (0-2,2-0)	2–2 (0-2,2-0)	4–1 (2-0,2-1)	2–3 (2-1,0-2)
RSG Philippines	3–2 (2-0,1-2)	4–1 (2-1,2-0)	2–3 (0-2,2-1)	—	3–3 (2-1,1-2)	3–2 (2-0,1-2)	0–4 (0-2,0-2)	3–2 (1-2,2-0)
ONIC Philippines	1–4 (0-2,1-2)	0–4 (0-2,0-2)	2–2 (0-2,2-0)	3–3 (2-1,1-2)	—	4–1 (2-1,2-0)	2–2 (2-0,0-2)	4–0 (2-0,2-0)
Smart Omega	2–2 (2-0,0-2)	4–2 (2-1,2-1)	2–2 (2-0,0-2)	2–3 (0-2,2-1)	1–4 (1-2,0-2)	—	2–2 (0-2,2-0)	4–0 (2-0,2-0)
Minana EVOS	3–2 (2-0,1-2)	0–4 (0-2,0-2)	1–4 (0-2,1-2)	4–0 (2-0,2-0)	2–2 (0-2,2-0)	2–2 (2-0,0-2)	—	2–3 (2-1,0-2)
TNC Pro Team	1–4 (0-2,1-2)	0–4 (0-2,0-2)	3–2 (1-2,2-0)	2–3 (2-1,0-2)	0–4 (0-2,0-2)	0–4 (0-2,0-2)	3–2 (1-2,2-0)	—

Updated to match(es) played on 29 October 2023. Source:
Legend: Blue = home team win; Yellow = draw; Red = away team win.

==== Playoff bracket ====
Play-in Round
3	Blacklist Int.	3
5	ONIC Philippines	2
4	RSG Slate Philippines	3
6	Omega Esports	0

Upper Bracket Semifinals
1	ECHO Philippines	1
3	Blacklist Int.	3
2	AP Bren	3
4	RSG Slate Philippines	2
Lower Bracket Knockouts
1	ECHO Philippines	3
4	RSG Philippines	1

Upper Bracket Finals
3	Blacklist Int.	0
2	AP Bren	3
Lower Bracket Finals
3	Blacklist Int.	3
1	ECHO Philippines	1

Grand Finals
2	AP Bren	4
3	Blacklist Int.	1

==== Final standings ====
Position	Winnings	Qualification		Team
Champions	$43,220	MPLI 2023	M5	AP Bren
1st Runner Up	$27,620	MPLI 2023	M5	Blacklist International
2nd Runner Up	$20,020	MPLI 2023		ECHO Philippines
3rd Runner Up	$12,260	MPLI 2023		RSG Philippines
5th-6th	$9,820	–		ONIC Philippines
5th-6th	$9,220	–		Omega Esports
7th	$6,720	–		Minana EVOS
8th	$4,320	–		TNC Pro Team

Unlike from previous seasons, the ONE Esports MPLI Invitational has invited only the Top Four teams of MPL Philippines, being AP Bren, Blacklist International, ECHO Philippines and RSG Philippines. Previously, the Top Six teams to qualify for the playoffs also qualified for MPLI. This was the case during MPLI 2022.

== Awards ==
=== Season 11 ===
- Weekly MVP Awards
  - Week 1 - Frederic "Bennyqt" Gonzales (ECHO)
  - Week 2 - Marco Stephen "Super Marco" Requitiano (APBRN) (1)
  - Week 3 - Tristan "YAWI" Cabrera (ECHO)
  - Week 4 - Natahanel "Nathzz" Estrologo (RSG)
  - Week 5 - Marco Stephen "Super Marco" Requitiano (APBRN) (2)
  - Week 6 - Ben "Benthings" Maglaque (TNC)
  - Week 7 - Johnmar "OhMyV33Nus" Villaluna (BLCK)
  - Week 8 - John "Irrad" Abarquez (RSG)
- Regular Season Most Valuable Player: Owgwen, BREN
- Best Rookie of the Season: Yue, BLCK
- Grand Finals MVP: Sanford, ECHO
- Team of the Season
  - Exp Lane - Sanford "Sanford" Vinuya (ECHO)
  - Jungle - Karl "KarlTzy" Nepomuceno (ECHO)
  - Mid Lane - Alston "Sanji" Pabico (ECHO)
  - Gold Lane - Frederic "Bennyqt" Gonzales (ECHO)
  - Roam - Tristan "Yawi" Cabrera (ECHO)

=== Season 12 ===
- Weekly MVP Awards
  - Week 1 - Renejay "Renejay" Barcase (BLCK)
  - Week 2 - Alston "Sanji" Pabico (ECHO)
  - Week 3 - Dean "Raizen" Sumagui (ONIC)
  - Week 4 - Nathanael "Nathzz" Estrologo (RSG)
  - Week 5 - Stephen "Super Marco" Requitiano (APBRN)
  - Week 6 - King "K1NGKONG" Perez (TNC)
- Regular Season Most Valuable Player: KarlTzy, ECHO
- Best Rookie of the Season: Matt, OMG
- Grand Finals MVP: FlapTzy, APBRN
- Best Coach of the Season: Tictac, ECHO
- Weekly MVP Awards
  - Exp Lane - Edward "Edward" Dapadap (BLCK)
  - Jungle - Karl "KarlTzy" Nepomuceno (ECHO)
  - Mid Lane - Alston "Sanji" Pabico (ECHO)
  - Gold Lane - Grant "Kelra" Pillas (OMG)
  - Roam - Rowgien "Owgwen" Unigo (APBRN)

== See also ==
- 2024 MPL Philippines season
- MPL Philippines
- MSC 2023
- MLBB M5 World Championship
