= 2023 MLBB Southeast Asia Cup =

Mobile game tournament

2023 Mobile Legends: Bang Bang Southeast Asia Cup
- 2023

Tournament information
- Game: Mobile Legends: Bang Bang
- Dates: 10–18 June 2023
- Administrator: Moonton
- Tournament format(s): Single Round Robin (Group Stage); Single Elimination (Playoffs)
- Host(s): Phnom Penh, Cambodia
- Venue(s): Aeon Mall Mean Chey, Phnom Penh
- Teams: 12
- Purse: $300,000

Final positions
- Champions: (Indonesia) ONIC (2nd Title)
- 1st runners-up: (Philippines) Blacklist International
- 2nd runners-up: ECHO Philippines

The 2023 Mobile Legends: Bang Bang Southeast Asia Cup, commonly referred as MSC 2023, was the sixth edition of the Mobile Legends: Bang Bang Mid Season Cup, the annual international esports tournament for the mobile game Mobile Legends: Bang Bang organized by Moonton.

MSC 2023 oversaw an increase of team representation from different regions of the World including North America, Turkey and MENA. The qualification for MSC 2023 happened during the spring-split of the Mobile Legends: Bang Bang Professional League (MPL) seasons, Moonton approved Regional tournaments and qualifier tournaments before the main tournament. MLBB powerhouses of the Philippines and Indonesia qualified its champion and first runner-up teams, while the remaining regions qualified the champions of their respective region. However, with the lack of compliance as per the MLBB Rulebook for MSC 2023, North American Champions of NACT 2023 Spring BloodThirstyKings were disqualified from the tournament. In replacement, first runner up team Outplay will be representing the region.

The hashtag "#SEATheWorld" was used as the official hashtag during the eight-day tournament.

Blacklist International and ONIC would once again face in a grand finals matchup. The most recent matchup in the grand finals for both teams was during MPLI 2021 where ONIC defeated Blacklist in four games. After being withheld of an international title since 2019, Indonesia won its first international title with ONIC winning their second MSC title. They defeated Blacklist International in six games, ending the dominance of the Philippines over the discipline temporarily.

== Background ==
On 14 March 2023, Moonton announced their partnership with the Esports Federation of Cambodia (EFC) to "co-promote the growth of the local esports industry and enhance the competitive gaming landscape of the country." Hence, declaring Cambodia to be the host for MSC 2023. The announcement of Cambodia's hosting for MSC 2023 was also announced during the MLBB M4 World Championship.

== Tournament format ==
=== Group stage ===
The Group Draw results were announced in Social Media via Facebook, Instagram and Twitter of Mobile Legends Esports. Among the twelve participating teams, every group will be drawn a designated champion from the regions of the Philippines, Indonesia, Malaysia and Myanmar, and the remaining teams will be drawn evenly. Each group will undergo a single round-robin tournament with matches being a best-of-three format.

The top two teams of each group will advance to a bracket draw for the playoffs and the third-seeded team of each group will be eliminated.

=== Knockout Stage ===
Unlike the previous iteration of the tournament, MSC 2023 will have a single-elimination bracket with games, and Knockout Stage matches will be best-of-five formats. Teams that lost in the Semifinals will proceed to the third-place match. The Grand Final is scheduled for 18 June 2023 with a best-of-seven series.

== Participating teams ==
MSC 2023 expanded its regional qualifications, qualifying teams from Turkey, North America, and MENA in the process.

Region	League	Qualification Method	Team	Group
The Philippines	MPL Philippines	MPL Philippines Season 11 Champion	ECHO Philippines	A
The Philippines	MPL Philippines	MPL Philippines Season 11 First Runner-Up	(Philippines) Blacklist International	D
Indonesia	MPL Indonesia	MPL Indonesia Season 11 Champion	(Indonesia) ONIC Esports	C
Indonesia	MPL Indonesia	MPL Indonesia Season 11 First Runner-Up	(Indonesia) EVOS Legends	B
Malaysia	MPL Malaysia	MPL Malaysia Season 11 Champion	(Malaysia) TODAK	D
Myanmar	MSC 2023: Myanmar Qualifier	MSC 2023: Myanmar Qualifier Champion	(Myanmar) Fenix Esports	B
Singapore	MPL Singapore	MPL Singapore Season 5 Champion	RSG Slate Singapore	B
Cambodia	MPL Cambodia	MPL Cambodia Spring 2023 Champion	(Cambodia) BURN X FLASH	C
Mekong Region	MSC 2023: Mekong Qualifier	MSC 2023: Mekong Qualifier Champion	(Laos) Team EVO	A
North America	North America Challenger Tournament	North America Challenger Tournament Spring 2023 Champion	(United States) ~~BloodThirstyKings~~	Disqualified
North America	North America Challenger Tournament	North America Challenger Tournament Spring 2023 First Runner-Up	(United States) Outplay	C
Turkey	MLBB Türkiye Championship	MLBB Türkiye Championship Season 1 Champion	(Turkey) Fire Flux Impunity	A
Middle East and North Africa	MPL MENA	MPL MENA Spring 2023 Champion	(Egypt) Team Occupy	D

=== Group draw results ===
Group A	Group B	Group C	Group D
ECHO Philippines	(Myanmar) Fenix Esports	(Indonesia) ONIC Esports	(Malaysia) TODAK
(Turkey) Fire Flux Impunity	RSG Slate Singapore	(United States) Outplay	(Philippines) Blacklist International
(Laos) Team EVO	(Indonesia) EVOS Legends	(Cambodia) BURN X FLASH	(Egypt) Team Occupy

== Group stage ==
=== Group A ===
Pos	Team	Pld	W	L	GF	GA	GD	Pts	Qualification	(Philippines) ECHO	(Turkey) FIMP	(Laos) EVO
1	ECHO Philippines	2	2	0	4	1	+3	2	Qualified for the Knockout Stage	—	2–1	2–0
2	(Turkey) Fire Flux Impunity	2	1	1	3	2	+1	1	Qualified for the Knockout Stage	1–2	—	2–0
3	(Laos) Team EVO	2	0	2	0	4	−4	0	Eliminated	0–2	0–2	—

Updated to match(es) played on 17 June 2023. Source: https://msc.mobilelegends.com/standing?type=group-stage

=== Group B ===
Pos	Team	Pld	W	L	GF	GA	GD	Pts	Qualification	(Singapore) RSG	(Indonesia) EVOS	(Myanmar) FNX
1	RSG Slate Singapore	2	2	0	4	0	+4	2	Qualified for the Knockout Stage	—	2–0	2–0
2	(Indonesia) EVOS Legends	2	1	1	2	3	−1	1	Qualified for the Knockout Stage	0–2	—	2–0
3	(Myanmar) Fenix Esports	2	0	2	1	4	−3	0	Eliminated	0–2	1–2	—

Updated to match(es) played on 17 June 2023. Source: https://msc.mobilelegends.com/standing?type=group-stage

=== Group C ===
Pos	Team	Pld	W	L	GF	GA	GD	Pts	Qualification	(Indonesia) ONIC	(Cambodia) BXF	(United States) OP
1	ONIC Esports	2	2	0	4	0	+4	2	Qualified for the Knockout Stage	—	2–0	2–0
2	(Cambodia) BURN X FLASH	2	1	1	2	2	0	1	Qualified for the Knockout Stage	0–2	—	2–0
3	(United States) Outplay	2	0	2	0	4	−4	0	Eliminated	0–2	0–2	—

Updated to match(es) played on 17 June 2023. Source: https://msc.mobilelegends.com/standing?type=group-stage

=== Group D ===
Pos	Team	Pld	W	L	GF	GA	GD	Pts	Qualification	(Philippines) BLCK	(Malaysia) TDK	(Egypt) OPY
1	(Philippines) Blacklist International	2	2	0	4	1	+3	2	Qualified for the Knockout Stage	—	2–1	2–0
2	(Malaysia) TODAK	2	1	1	3	2	+1	1	Qualified for the Knockout Stage	1–2	—	2–0
3	(Egypt) Team Occupy	2	0	2	0	4	−4	0	Eliminated	0–2	0–2	—

Updated to match(es) played on 17 June 2023. Source: https://msc.mobilelegends.com/standing?type=group-stage

== Playoffs ==
All matches are a best-of-five series, except for the Grand Final, which is a best-of-seven series.

Quarterfinals (Bo5)
RSG Slate Singapore	0
(Cambodia) BURN X FLASH	3
(Philippines) Blacklist International	3
(Turkey) Fire Flux Impunity	0
ECHO Philippines	3
(Malaysia) TODAK	1
(Indonesia) ONIC	3
(Indonesia) EVOS Legends	0

Semifinals (Bo5)
(Cambodia) BURN X FLASH	1
(Philippines) Blacklist International	3
ECHO Philippines	0
(Indonesia) ONIC	3

Grand Final (Bo7)
(Philippines) Blacklist International	2
(Indonesia) ONIC	4
Third Place Match (Bo5)
(Cambodia) BURN X FLASH	2
ECHO Philippines	3

== See also ==
- MPL Philippines Season 11
- MPL Indonesia
- MPL Philippines
- Mobile Legends: Bang Bang Southeast Asia Cup
