= Team Flash =

Southeast Asian esports organization

- Short name: FL, FPT
- Divisions: Arena of Valor; FIFA Online 4 Fortnite; Free Fire; Hearthstone; League of Legends; Wild Rift; PUBG Mobile
- Founded: 2010
- League: Arena of Glory; Vietnam Championship Series; Icon Series SEA; Wild Rift Champions SEA; PUBG Mobile Pro League SEA; Free Fire World Series SEA
- Based in: Singapore and Vietnam
- Location: Southeast Asia
- Website: www.teamflash.gg

Team Flash is a professional esports organization based in Singapore. They compete in several esports disciplines and games including Arena of Valor, Hearthstone, League of Legends, Mobile Legends: Bang Bang, and PUBG Mobile. The organization also formerly fueled teams in Brawl Stars, EA Sports FC Online, Dota 2, Free Fire, StarCraft II, League of Legends: Wild Rift, and Valorant

Team Flash's League of Legends team competes in the Vietnam Championship Series (VCS), the highest level of competitive League of Legends in Vietnam and its region. Team Flash's accolades includes winning back-to-back titles in the VCS during the Spring and Summer splits of 2020, defeating GAM Esports in both separate occasions and qualified for the Mid-Season Invitational in 2020 and the 2020 League of Legends World Championships. The organization's Mobile Legends: Bang Bang team participates in the annual Mobile Legends: Bang Bang Professional League of Singapore (MPL Singapore) as "NIP Flash" with its recent partnership with Ninjas in Pyjamas. The team recently had been a consistent participant in MPL Singapore, winning back-to-back titles for Season 6 and Season 7, the qualifying tournaments for the MLBB M5 World Championship and MSC 2024, respectively. Its Arena of Valor team was the runner-up of the 2018 AOV International Championship, champions of the 2019 AOV World Cup and 2019 AOV International Championship, and six-time winners of the regional Arena of Glory. Its FIFA Online 4 team is a two-time winner of the prestigious EA Champions Cup (EACC).

Team Flash and the Singapore Sports Hub announced on 1 March 2019 that they were entering a talent development partnership and opening Singapore's first esports training facility.

== FIFA Online 4 ==
=== History ===
In March 2018 Team Flash qualified for the spring season of the EA Champions Cup (EACC) in Bangkok, Thailand, as representatives of Singapore. The roster consisted of Singaporeans Amraan "Amraan" Gani and Fardeen "Fardhino" Hussain, and Malaysian Darren "RippedJean" Gan. The team won the spring cup on 3 April 2018. Prior to this victory, the best finish a Singaporean team had in the EACC was third place. Team Flash won the cup again in November 2018, this time winning the winter cup in Seoul, South Korea.

== League of Legends ==
=== History ===
Team Flash first entered the professional League of Legends scene in November 2011, competing in ESL-sponsored online tournaments in Singapore and the 2011 World Cyber Games. The team's roster was acquired by the Singapore Sentinels in March 2012 and the organization disbanded its League of Legends division. In January 2017 Team Flash acquired the roster of Vestigial with the intention of having them compete in the 2017 spring season of TCL Singapore. However, they were suddenly replaced with the roster of Team Rigel days before roster finalizations. After qualifying for the 2017 spring season of the Garena Premier League (GPL) through TLC Singapore, the roster left the organization.

In late 2018 Team Flash announced a new Vietnam-based team that would compete in the secondary league of the Vietnam Championship Series (VCS), known as VCS B. After defeating Đạt Gaming 3–1 in the second round of 2019 VCS B Spring, Team Flash's roster and promotion tournament spot were sold to QTV Gaming. Team Flash later reentered the professional scene in Vietnam in June 2019, when it announced that it had acquired the roster of Sky Gaming and would compete in the VCS.

Team Flash finished second in the regular season of VCS 2019 Summer, qualifying for playoffs. In the semifinals they defeated long time favourites Dashing Buffalo 3–1, but lost to GAM Esports 0–3 in the finals. After losing 1–3 to Lowkey Esports in the final series of the losers' bracket, Team Flash was eliminated from Worlds' contention.

During VCS 2020 Spring, Team Flash once again finished second in the regular season. This gave them a bye to the second round, where they defeated EVOS Esports 3–1 to qualify for the grand finals. Despite being heavy favourites to win the split, defending champions GAM Esports were defeated by Team Flash in a close series, earning the team their first VCS title.

Team Flash finished second in the regular season yet again during VCS 2020 Summer, earning them a spot in the winners' bracket of playoffs. The team made it all the way to the finals, where they defeated GAM Esports again to claim their second VCS title after another close series.

=== Current roster ===
Team Flash League of Legends roster
Players
Coaches

Role	Handle	Name	Nationality
Coach	Stark	Phan Công Minh	Vietnam
Top	Yoshino	Lê Trung Kiên	Vietnam
Jungle	Dante	Lê Văn Dự	Vietnam
Jungle	Phuc1	Nguyễn Minh Phúc	Vietnam
Mid	Nogo	Trần Quốc Đạt	Vietnam
Mid	Jane	Nguyễn Hoàng Khánh	Vietnam
Bot	Pudding	Lương Thanh Tài	Vietnam
Support	Arte	Vũ Ngọc Hiền	Vietnam

Head coach

Nhật Bịp Bợm

Legend:
- (I) Inactive
- (S) Suspended
- Substitute
- (injured) Injury / Illness

Latest roster transaction: 7 December 2020.
