= Blacklist International =

Filipino esports organization

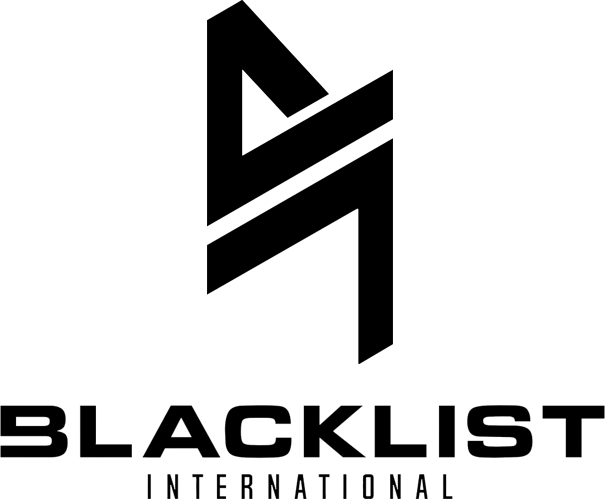
- Short name: BLCK; G2B (Wild Rift)
- Divisions: League of Legends: Wild Rift; PUBG; Garena Free Fire; Dota 2 Apex Legends; Honor of Kings
- Based in: Quezon City, Metro Manila, Philippines
- Location: Southeast Asia
- Colors: Black; Dark Blue; Orange; White
- Owner: Tryke Gutierrez
- CEO: Tryke Gutierrez
- League titles: See Also
- Official fan club: Blacklist Agents
- Partners: Oppo; GCash; Globe; Tea Bliss; Petron; Greenwich; Predator; Nanoleaf; Peculiar Eyewear; CU Dental Office; Milo
- Parent group: Tier One Entertainment

Blacklist International is a Southeast Asian esports organization under Tier One Entertainment. They manage competitive esports divisions in several esports disciplines including Dota 2 and Honor of Kings. They formerly fueled rosters for Mobile Legends: Bang Bang and Call of Duty: Mobile.

== Esports history ==
=== Mobile Legends: Bang Bang ===
Blacklist International's notoriety in the Mobile Legends: Bang Bang began after their appearance in MPL Philippines Season 5 when Tier One Entertainment, the parent company of Blacklist International, acquired the roster of EVOS Esports PH which has current members in Edward "Edward" Dapadap and Head Coach Kristoffer "Bon Chan" Ricaplaza in its roster. The team steadily progressed to stardom following their progression in the league that made them a formidable contender for the next few seasons.

During the offseason of MPL Philippines Season 7, an orchestrated trade occurred that got Blacklist the services of the colloquially known "VEEWISE" tandem of Johnmar "OhMyV33Nus" Villaluna and Danerie "Wise" Del Rosario for upcoming star Jungler Kairi "Kairi" Rayosdelsol. The team qualified for the MLBB M3 World Championship that became the pinnacle of their esports journey thus far in MLBB when the team swept the Finals in an all-out Philippines vs. Philippines Finals.

Their notorious rise remained progressing as the team represented the Philippines in the 2021 SEA Games in Hanoi. The team defeated Indonesia in the Grand Finals to secure the country's second-consecutive gold medal.

In 2022, the team returned to the world championship finals after a five-game series against their co-patriots ECHO Philippines in the upper-bracket finals. The team were heavy favorites to go back-to-back in the world championship finals as they won the previous iteration of the finals in Singapore. However, the team was stunned after a 4–0 sweep by ECHO in the Finals that ultimately ended their back-to-back world championship campaign.

In the Summer of 2023, the team went back to the MPL Philippines Grand Finals for the second-season in a row and the team got swept again by ECHO in the eleventh season. The team fell short of expectations in Season 11 following the dominant performance of ECHO in all four played games in the Grand Finals. Moreover, the team was not heavily favored to win MSC 2023, the international tournament that the team had qualified for alongside ECHO. However, the team became the only Filipino team to qualify for the Grand Finals, defeating the homegrown team BURN X FLASH 3–1, but the team suffered a 4–2 loss in the Grand Finals to Indonesia's ONIC Esports with two Filipino imports in their organization. To this day, the MSC title is the only major international trophy thus far that Blacklist International has yet to win.

In the Fall of 2023, the team were major underdogs for the twelfth season of MPL Philippines, having their star-duos sitting out the season following their MSC 2023 campaign. Regardless, the team promoted Renejay "Renejay" Barcarse from his sixth-man role to becoming the starting roamer for the team in Season 12. All though they finished in the middle of the pack, Blacklist International defied expectations and swept the defending world champions ECHO Philippines in the lower-bracket finals to qualify for the MLBB M5 World Championship. The team would be lauded for the underdog performances in the playoffs and in the M5 World Championships itself. The team would lose the Season 12 title and the M5 World Championship Finals berth after losing matches to fellow Filipino team AP Bren.

In the Summer of 2024, Blacklist would sit Barcase out for the season for personal reasons and opted to not compete for Season 13. The team finished sixth in the regular season but had a reasonable finish as the fourth place team, losing to RSG Philippines in the lower bracket knockouts 3–1.

As of June 20, 2024, Blacklist International holds 1 MLBB World Title, 1 SEA Games Gold Medal, and 3 MPL Philippines championship trophies alongside 2 World Finals Appearances, 2 Mid Season Cup Finals Appearance, and 5 MPL Philippines finals appearances.

On January 21, 2025, they announced their departure from MPL Philippines.

=== League of Legends: Wildrift ===
In the Summer of 2023, Blacklist International announced their partnership with League of Legends powerhouse G2 Esports to form the organization's first League of Legends: Wild Rift roster. This roster began to play in the Wild Rift League Asia Phase 2 tournament for the Philippines Qualifier. Blacklist would end their WRL Asia 2023 campaign after a 2–1 defeat to FENNEL Adversity in the lower bracket semifinals.

The team would perform subpar in other tournaments in the Fall of 2023 but would rebound in the Summer of 2024 for the Wild Rift League Asia - APA Conference. The team would go 7–5 in the regular season and qualified for the playoffs. The team 4–1 CERBERUS Esports but would fall to KT Rolster 4–2 in the Upper Bracket Final to qualify for WRL Asia Season 2 Finals. G2-Blacklist would rebound in the Lower Bracket Finals, delivering a 4–2 win over co-patriots NAOS Esports to qualify for WRL Asia Season 2 Finals.

The team would perform the worst in the WRL Asia Season 2 Finals, losing all of their single-round robin tournament matches to start at the very bottom of the King of the Hill tournament ladder. The team would sweep KT and would pull an upset against EDward Gaming, winning the series 3–1 to qualify for the Finals where they lost to KeepBest Gaming in seven games.

=== Call of Duty: Mobile ===
Blacklist International acquired the roster of Ultimate E-Pro in a collaboration effort to establish the organization's first Call of Duty: Mobile roster. The team would participate in the country's local Garena Masters Tournaments that would inevitably bring the team to the CODM World Championships in 2021 for the Eastern Finals. Blacklist Ultimate won their first international title against ALMIGHTY Esports from Singapore, considered as the team's kryptonite. Both teams went back-and-forth during their Finals series that ultimately ended with the title for the side of Blacklist Ultimate after a 6–5 Search & Destroy victory in the map Crossfire.

In the Fall of 2023, the organization would release their Call of Duty: Mobile roster. According to the post, the team had won six championship titles in both local and international tournaments, with the penultimate title being the 2021 World Championship East Finals title.

=== Dota 2 ===
On December 4, 2022, Blacklist executives Tryke Gutierez and Alodia Gosiengfiao officially introduced the new esports division in Dota 2, Blacklist Rivalry a partnership together with the Rivalry, an online company that specialize in sports and e-sports betting. During the event, the first thing introduced was the team's jersey with black and orange coming from Blacklist and Rivalry where inspired by the TNC's color and the binary code in Rivalry logo which translates to "PHOENIX", in reference to former TNC reborn team. On November 24, 2022, with new established team, Tier One Entertainment announced the newly acquired all-star Filipino Dota 2 rosters and expected to compete in the 2023 Dota Pro Circuit after purchasing Resurgence Esports (RSG).

In August 2024, Blacklist International secured a spot in the main event of the $1,000,000 PGL Wallachia Season 2 after defeating Skem & Friends 3–1 in the Southeast Asia closed qualifiers. The team will compete against top teams like Team Falcons and Team Liquid in Bucharest. They faced previous visa issues that prevented participation in PGL Wallachia Season 1.

=== Other ===
Blacklist International's Garena Free Fire team represents Malaysia. It was originally competed as Argon Baby prior to Tier One's acquisition of the esports team in 2021.

It was announced on 25 May 2024 that Blacklist International would enter Apex Legends esports by signing European roster 2R1C (2 Rats 1 Controller). The roster left at the end of August; Jose "Uxako" Llosa and Filipe "Hikara" Morgado would go on to win the ALGS Year 4 Championship with GoNext Esports.

== Tournament results ==
=== Season Overview ===
Year		MPL Philippines								Mobile Legends: Bang Bang Mid Season Cup	Mobile Legends: Bang Bang World Championships
Year		P	W	L	Match W-L	W-L%	Match W-L%	Seed	Playoffs	Mobile Legends: Bang Bang Mid Season Cup	Mobile Legends: Bang Bang World Championships
2020	Season 5	9	4	5	9-11	.444	.450	6th	Defeated 2-0 by Execration	Did not qualify	Did not qualify
2020	Season 6	13	7	6	16-15	.538	.516	3rd	Lost 2–3 to Smart Omega	Did not qualify	Did not qualify
2021	Season 7	13	12	1	25-7	.923	.781	1st	Winners; 4-3 Execration	Runner-Up; 1-4 Execration	Winners; 4-0 ONIC Philippines
2021	Season 8	14	13	1	26-7	.929	.788	1st	Winners; 4-1; ONIC Philippines	Runner-Up; 1-4 Execration	Winners; 4-0 ONIC Philippines
2022	Season 9	14	3	11	13-24	.214	.351	7th	Did not qualify	Did not qualify	Runner-Up; 0-4; ECHO Philippines
2022	Season 10	14	9	5	22-12	.643	.647	1st	Winners; 4-2; ECHO Philippines	Did not qualify	Runner-Up; 0-4; ECHO Philippines
2023	Season 11	14	8	6	18-14	.571	.563	3rd	Runner-Up; 0-4; ECHO Philippines	Runner-Up; 2-4; ONIC Esports	2nd Runner-Up; 0-3; AP Bren
2023	Season 12	14	8	6	17-15	.571	.531	3rd	Runner-Up; 1-4; AP Bren	Runner-Up; 2-4; ONIC Esports	2nd Runner-Up; 0-3; AP Bren
2024	Season 13	14	7	7	15-20	.500	.429	5th	3rd Runner Up; 1-3; RSG Philippines	Did not qualify	Did not qualify
2024	Season 14	14	5	9	12-20	.357	.375	6th	3rd Runner Up; 0-3; Aurora Gaming	Did not qualify	Did not qualify
Record		119	71	48	161-125	.597	3 MPL Titles				1 MLBB World Championship

=== Mobile Legends: Bang-Bang Development League (MDL-PH) ===
==== Season 1 ====
On January 30, 2023, Blacklist International announced their upcoming roster team named "Blacklist Academy", in the Philippine franchise of Mobile Legends: Bang Bang Development League (MDL), It is composed of young players that will play under the same banner of Blacklist organization.

==== Season 2 ====
Following the conclusion of Season 1, in the offseason, Blacklist International announced that their MDL Team will be partnering with the Malaysian organization Team Lunatix. The team was rebranded from Blacklist Academy to Blacklist Lunatix following the agreement.

On September 22, 2023, Blacklist International's management announced that they will be severing ties with Team Lunatix amidst the expose of mishandling reports from the side of Team Lunatix. MDL Philippines management concluded that there was an mishandling effort from Team Lunatix as they did not fulfill their end of the agreement. On the same day, Blacklist International announced their complete control and takeover of Blacklist Academy.

==== Season 3 ====
On February 14, 2024, Blacklist International revealed that it partnered with the Rough World Era organization for the upcoming third season of MDL Philippines. A day later, the organization revealed the new roster for Blacklist Academy.

Year	MDL Philippines								Finish	Playoffs
Year	Season	GP	W	L	MW	ML	W-L%	MW-ML%	Finish	Playoffs
2023	Season 1	13	7	6	18	15	.538	.545	2nd Seed; Group A	3rd-4th Place; 0–2 GameLab
2023	Season 2	11	3	8	7	17	.273	.292	10th Seed	Did not qualify for the playoffs
2024	Season 3	9	5	4	11	8	.556	.579	3rd Seed	3rd-4th Place; 0–2 RRQ Kaito
2024	Season 4	11	4	7	10	17	.364	.370	8th Seed	7th-8th Place; 0-2 Team Liquid Academy
2025	Season 6	Replacement partners with Twisted Minds								9th-16th Place; 0-2 AP Bren x Rough World Era

== Rosters ==
Blacklist International rosters

Apex Legends International
Handle	Name	Nationality
Uxako	Jose Llosa	Spain
Hiraka	Filipe Morgado	Portugal
Jmw	Jake Walters	United Kingdom
tur0gh	Jansen Siqueira	Brazil

Dota 2 International
Handle	Name	Nationality
Natsumi-	Jose Anthony Vargas	Philippines
Abed	Abed Yusop	Philippines
Gabbi	Kim Villafuerte Santos	Philippines
TIMS	Timothy Randrup	Philippines
Jaunuel	Jaunuel Arcilla	Philippines

Free Fire International
Handle	Name	Nationality
Trapz	Muhammad Azman Buyung	Malaysia

StarCraft II Division International
Handle	Name	Nationality
Creator	Jang Hyun-woo	South Korea
StarDash	.	Philippines

League of Legends: Wildrift G2-Blacklist
Handle	Name	Nationality
Chammy	Chammy Paul Nazarrea	Philippines
kaedy	Justine Ritchie Tan	Philippines
Aaron	Aaron Mark Bingay	Philippines
Goldenk1te	Golden Hart Dajao	Philippines

Legend:
- (I) Inactive
- (S) Suspended
- (L) On loan
- (2W) Two-way player
- Substitute
- (injured) Injury / Illness

== Championships ==
Championship and medals of Blacklist International
Mobile Legends: Bang Bang	Call of Duty: Mobile	Dota 2	Free Fire
MLBB M-World Championship: Winner in 2021 (M3 World Championships); MPL Philippines; Winner in 2021 - Leg 1 (Season 7); Winner in 2021 - Leg 2 (Season 8); Winner in 2023 - Leg 2 (Season 10); Southeast Asian Games; Winner of SIBOL 2022 National Team Selection; Winner of Gold in the 2021 SEA Games	World Championship: East Finals Winner in 2021 (as Blacklist Ultimate); Garena Invitational; Winner in 2022 (as Blacklist Ultimate); Garena Masters; Winner in 2023 (as Blacklist Ultimate); PH Invitational; Winter Winner in 2021 (as Blacklist Ultimate)	ESL One Kuala Lumpur Qualifier; Qualifier Winner in 2023 (as Blacklist-Rivalry)	MCP Majors; Winner in 2021

== Controversies ==
Kiel "Oheb" Soriano, a player of Blacklist International, was suspended for two matches and fined $500 (≈PHP 25,000) after flashing middle finger after a 2–0 victory against the Smart Omega on the 9 October 2021. The recent statement of MPL-Philippines Operating Committee said that it "does not tolerate any form of abusive behavior in the league and we expect our professional players to follow a strict code of conduct." The rivalry between the two teams started since back Season 7 and heated up after the statement of Smart Omega player Duane "Kelra" Pillas against the VeeWise duo.

Blacklist International were announced as member of the Esports World Cup Foundation Club Support Program on the 6 May 2024. This program has been funded by Saudi Arabia's Public Investment Fund, and it and the accompanying 2024 Esports World Cup have been accused of being sportswashing device for the Kingdom of Saudi Arabia.

Awards and achievements
Preceded by Bren Esports	MLBB World Championship winner 2021	Succeeded by ECHO Philippines
Preceded by Bren Esports; Themselves; RSG Philippines	MPL Philippines Champions; Season 7 Season 8 Season 10	Succeeded by Themselves; RSG Philippines; ECHO Philippines
