= Alodia Gosiengfiao =

Filipino cosplayer (born 1988)

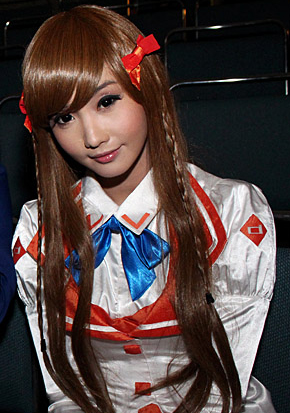
- Gosiengfiao as Mirai Suenaga at Anime Expo 2013
- Born: Alodía Almira Arraiza Gosiengfiao; March 9, 1988 (age 38); Quezon City, Philippines
- Other names: Edj; Queen Siopao (QS)
- Education: Ateneo de Manila University (BFA)
- Occupations: Model; host; streamer; cosplayer; singer; actress; entrepreneur
- Years active: 2003–present
- Spouse: Christopher Quimbo (m. 2023)
- Children: 1
- Relatives: Joey Gosiengfiao (uncle)

YouTube information
- Channel: Alodia Gosiengfiao
- Years active: 2006–present
- Genres: Cosplay; art; gaming; technology; vlogging
- Subscribers: 1.85 million
- Views: 111 million
- Last updated: April 14, 2021

Alodía Almira Gosiengfiao Quimbo (née Gosiengfiao; born March 9, 1988) is a Filipino cosplayer, model, TV presenter, singer, vlogger, actress and co-founder of Tier One Entertainment. She is also known as Senpai Alodia of the Philippines. As a celebrity endorser, she is one of the ambassadors and VJ for Animax Asia known as the "Ani-mates" and co-host of ABS-CBN's prank show Laugh Out Loud. She has been featured in various magazines, newspapers and TV shows locally and abroad. She appeared on the Filipino FHM 100 Sexiest Women poll, ranking No. 1 in 2009, No. 2 in 2010 and No. 3 in 2012; she posed as the cover girl for that magazine on its July 2013 issue. She was named by DOS Magazine as one of the Most Influential Women in the Philippines.

== Cosplaying ==
Gosiengfiao became involved in cosplay after contacting other anime and video game enthusiasts in an internet fan forum called Animé Club. Encouraged by her friends from the forum, she started cosplaying in 2003 at the age of 15, joining various competitions in Metro Manila. Her first cosplayed character was a Priestess from Ragnarok Online at Ragnalaunch in Glorietta. She began to attract attention when she won 3rd place in the 2003 C3 Convention as Gun Mage Rikku of Final Fantasy X-2. This led to her and her younger sister Ashley Gosiengfiao being featured on the cover of Issue 14 of Culture Crash Magazine, a manga magazine in the Philippines. Since then, she cosplayed a series of characters from over 40 anime, movie and video game titles including: Witchblade, G.I. Joe, K-On!, Paradise Kiss, Evangelion and Final Fantasy X-2. As a multi-awarded cosplayer, she is now being invited to appear at conventions or to judge competitions locally and abroad. She started judging at the age of 18.

=== International appearances ===
Due to her constant contribution to the cosplay community in the Philippines, Gosiengfiao has been invited into various international cosplay conventions and events as a participant, performer, judge or simply to attend as a guest. In November 2009 at Suntec Convention Hall in Singapore, Alodía, together with her younger sister Ashley, represented the Philippines as one of the finalist for the Anime Festival Asia Regional Cosplay Championship. Alodía and Ashley cosplayed as Masane Amaha and Shiori Tsuzuki from the Witchblade anime.

On July 3, 2010, Singapore, Alodía and Ashley Gosiengfiao were invited by the Mascot Parade supported by the Singapore Government to judge the cosplay competition. They both cosplayed characters from the romantic anime series Paradise Kiss. In addition to judging the cosplay competition, Alodía and Ashley also performed two songs on stage: "Lonely in Gorgeous" from Paradise Kiss and "Real Emotion" from the hit Japanese roleplaying game Final Fantasy X-2. Animax also held "meet and greet" sessions with Alodía in Camp Pong for Singaporean anime and cosplay enthusiasts.

On July 21–24, 2010, Gosiengfiao attended the annual San Diego Comic-Con for a cosplay gathering at Kotobukiya booth. She landed a big role in the San Diego Comic-Con documentary directed by Morgan Spurlock and produced by Legendary Pictures. The documentary team followed 5 different people from around the world to document what they did at San Diego Comic-Con in the United States – line up includes an artist, comic book enthusiast, cosplayer, etc. Part of the team was Stan Lee, the father of Marvel Comics. This led to a meeting with Legendary Pictures CEO/founder Thomas Tull and vice president Alex Garcia, regarding their upcoming film, Warcraft. After this meeting, Gosiengfiao was featured in a very popular US-based website Kotaku. Blizzard Entertainment, maker of Warcraft, got in touch with Alodía regarding business and an endorsement deal for their new game, Star Craft 2. She also won the "Hall Costume Award" as an award given by the Costume Designers Guild to convention members who wear exceptional get-ups inside the venue.

On October 31, 2010, Gosiengfiao, together with Animax and Hong Kong Tourism Board held an event "Hong Kong Halloween Treats Party". Hong Kong Halloween Treats Party is the culmination of a one-and-a-half-month-long campaign by Hong Kong Tourism Board and Animax to promote Hong Kong across South-East Asia as the dream Halloween destination. Cosplayers from all over Asia gathered to celebrate the event.

On November 13, 2010, she was back again in Singapore for the Anime Festival Asia 2010 in Suntec Convention Hall, this time she was invited as a Celebrity Judge for the AFA Regional Cosplay Championship. The same event Alodía and Ashley attended as a finalist and representative of the Philippines way back 2009. Gosiengfiao graced the event along with the Japanese celebrity guests namely Ichirou Mizuki, May'n, SCANDAL, JAM Project, Angela, Kana Hanazawa, Milky Holmes and the Cosplayers Kaname and Aira.

On November 27, 2010, Gosiengfiao's "Rei Ayanami" Grimrock version cosplay made its first appearance at the 2010 Supanova Pop Culture Expo in Brisbane, Australia, she was invited to guest judge the Madman National Cosplay Championship as part of the Supanova Cosplay Festival.

== Endorsements, media and press ==
Her achievements in the cosplay community led her way to be recognized by the mainstream media and various companies in the Philippines. Currently she is endorsing a whitening skin care product; a health food and beverage product; a Japanese sushi bar; a toy collector and figurine distributor in the Philippines; a large video game company based in Japan; a clothing line; and Japanese snack. She also became one of the brand ambassador of a Philippine telecommunication company, and in 2012 became a brand ambassador for Canon.

Past endorsements include many video game companies such as Level-Up Games, E-Games, Kelphil's Shade and SEGA's Love and Berry. She was part of the Official Muse Guild for the massively multiplayer online role-playing game (MMORPG) Mu Online. She was also a game moderator for another MMORPG called Khan Online. Gosiengfiao was chosen as the Rose-It Girl during the Level Up Games' ROSE Online event and was given the title of "Community Manager" and a one-year contract with Level Up Games. As the official model and endorser of IPVG-EGames Zhu Xian Online game in 2009, Gosiengfiao, an avid gamer, hold her first Fans Day during the Domination 3 Event in April 2009.

Gosiengfiao is the Animax's first ever Levi's Kawaii girl winner in the last episode of Mad Mad Fun, which was announced on air on October 27, 2007. In 2010, Alodia together with Ashley Gosiengfiao and model Steph Henares was chosen by Animax to be their Ambassador and VJ, known as the Ani-Mates. It was the first time Animax had chosen a cosplayer as one of its VJs. Gosiengfiao's cosplay and hosting stints in various events and Animax paved the way for her first project in ABS-CBN. She is now seen as a Host in ABS-CBN's prank show titled "L.O.L" (Laugh Out Loud) with Luis Manzano every Saturday night.

She has been featured in several magazines such as Candy Magazine, Mega, Preview, GAME! Magazine, Digital Photographers Philippines Magazine and newspapers like Philippine Daily Inquirer, Manila Bulletin and Manila Times. She was also invited to appear as guest on TV shows like MogTV, QTV 11 now GMA News TV, Front Act, Matanglawin, Mel and Joey and Ang Pinaka. Other than local media, Gosiengfiao has also been featured in newspapers and magazines in different countries such as Japan, Singapore and United States. She was also part of the book called OTACOOL: Worldwide Otaku Rooms and OTACOOL2: Worldwide Cosplayers by Danny Choo.

She was also featured on a TV show in Tokyo Culture: Japan, featuring her costumes, artworks, comic books and figure collections which was also shown in Animax. Additionally, she was featured in Channel News Asia: Primetime Morning and Straits Times Razor TV in Singapore.

Gosiengfiao ranked No. 76 in the Philippine FHM 100 Sexiest Women poll for 2010 and ranked No. 87 in 2009. She was named by UNO Magazine as one of the Most Influential Women in the Philippines.

In 2016, Gosiengfiao appeared as one of the zombies along with her sister, Ashley Gosiengfiao, in Resident Evil: The Final Chapter, which is a final installment of Resident Evil film series, which was released in the Philippines in the following year.

== Gaming career ==
As she continued her rise to international recognition in cosplay, Gosiengfiao branched out to her lifelong passion of gaming. In 2014, she started streaming video games on Twitch and quickly became a Twitch Partner by streaming various games such as Dota 2 and League of Legends. Through her streaming endeavors she was able to secure brand deals with various gaming sponsors such as Acer Predator, Sony PlayStation Asia and many others. On April 21, 2017, Gosiengfiao and veteran esports shout caster Tryke Gutierrez founded Tier One Entertainment, the Philippines' first gaming and esports agency, which also made its reach in some parts of Southeast Asia. On March 14, 2018, she announced her exclusive partnership with Facebook Gaming and transitioned her video game streams and content to her official Facebook Page.

On June 13, 2018, Gosiengfiao teamed up with Sony PlayStation to promote Days Gone and Spiderman at E3 2018. During E3 2018, she and fellow Facebook Gaming partners Stonemountain64 and other creators participated in the first Facebook Gaming Creator meet and greets.

On December 4, 2018, Gosiengfiao went viral on Italian news as her Mobile Legends gaming stream interrupted Italian Deputy Prime Minister Matteo Salvini's Facebook stream. It is unclear how the interruption happened, but it resulted in over 12,000 of Salvini's viewers video chained to her gaming stream.

On February 21, 2020, Lyceum of the Philippines University announced its partnership with Gosiengfiao to develop Esports curriculum with Gosiengfiao's company, Tier One Entertainment.

== Personal life ==
Alodia Gosiengfiao lives in Quezon City and is fond of art, fashion, gadgets, video games, photography, collecting toys and figures such as BJDs, and plays the piano. Her mother found her name in a name book; 'Alodia' means "love" and 'Almira' means "princess". She is of Filipino and Chinese descent; her father, Ed Gosiengfiao, a businessman and mechanical engineer, is Chinese Filipino while her mother, Mariglor Arraiza, is a former customer service advisor. She has a younger sister, Ashley Gosiengfiao, who is also a cosplayer. She is the niece of former Filipino film director Joey Gosiengfiao.

Gosiengfiao attended Assumption College in Makati from pre-school to grade 2, Miriam College in Quezon City from grade 3 to her fourth year of high school, and the Ateneo de Manila University, where she graduated in 2009 with a BFA degree in information design. As a high school student, she was a member of the Miriam College High School pep squad. She also worked on art commissions for international clients, illustrating both digital and traditional artwork.

On February 14, 2018, Gosiengfiao and YouTube vlogger Wil Dasovich revealed that they were in a relationship. On November 14, 2021, Gosiengfiao confirmed through her Facebook page that she and Dasovich have broken up. In early 2022, Gosiengfiao entered a relationship with business executive Christopher Quimbo. The couple married on February 14, 2023. Their first child, a son, Cameron, was born in November 2024.

On Valentine's Day of 2021, she and her sister Ashley launched their podcast named The Raid with Alodia and Ashley on Spotify.

== Filmography ==
=== Film ===
Year	Title	Role
2011	Comic-Con Episode IV: A Fan's Hope	Herself
2011	Tween Academy: Class of 2012	Herself
2012	Kimmy Dora and the Temple of Kiyeme	Sang Kang Kang
2012	The Reunion	Julie
2015	Crossroads	Angela
2016	Resident Evil: The Final Chapter	Zombie
2024	Friendly Fire	Herself

=== Television ===
Year	Title	Role
2010–2011	Laugh Out Loud	Herself (host)
2012	Regal Shocker	Nika
2012	It's Showtime	Herself (judge)
2012	Pop Talk	Celebrity Reviewer
2013	Party Pilipinas	Herself
2013	Minute to Win It	Herself
2013	iBilib	Herself
2013	It's Showtime	Herself (judge)
2018	Leading Women	Herself
2018	Mars	Herself
2018	Celebrity Bluff	Herself
2018	Magpakailanman	Herself
2018	Tonight with Boy Abunda	Herself (studio audience)
2018	Headstart with Karen Davila	Herself
2018	Rated K	Herself
2019	Minute To Win It – Last Tandem Standing	Herself (contestant)

== Discography ==
- "アジアの変身" – Super Dolls – (2013)
- "ヒロイン症候群" – Super Dolls – (2013)
- "かわいいガール" (featuring Tenchim & Dempagumi.inc) – (2013)
- Tear It Off – Mobile Legends: Bang Bang (2022)

== Awards, Wins, and Formal Honors ==
Year	Awarding Body	Award	Placement and Notes	Ref
2023	Culture Crash Comics Convention	People's Choice Award	3rd Place – Magic Gunner Rikku, Final Fantasy X-2	
2004	Ragnarok Online World Championships	Alberta Craftsmanship Award	Isis	
2005	Anime Explosion	Best Props Most Innovative	1st Place – Creature Pink, Gunbound	
2006	Philippine Toys & Hobbies Collection Convention	Best Group Cosplay	Alexiel, Angel Sanctuary	
2006	National Cosplay Competition	Online Voting Winner	Arua, ROSE Online	
2007	Animax/Levi's	Kawaii Girl	First winner	
2010	Costume Designers Guild / San Diego Comic Con	Hall Costume Award		
2013	Chulo Magazine Awards	Sexiest Cosplay Model of the Year		
2017	ToyCon Philippines	Pinoy Pop Culture Icon Award – Cosplay Queen		
2020	Creator and Influencer Council of the Philippines (CICP)	Spotlight Awards	Gaming Champion	
2021	Village Pipol Choice Awards	Online Streamer of the Year		
2022	Philippine Esports Awards	PH Esports Content Creator of the Year		
2023	Asia Leaders Awards	Woman of Substance		
2023	Philippine Esports Awards	PH Esports Lifetime Award	(Note: The 2023 ceremony was held April 2024)	
2026	ToyCon Philippines	Cosplay Hall of Fame	Inaugural Inductee	

=== Major Editorial/Industry Recognitions ===
Year	Publisher	Category	Ref
2009	Uno Magazine	52 Most Influential Women in the Philippines	
2018	FemaleNetwork / Summit Media	FN Life Peg	

=== FHM 100 Sexiest Women ===
Year	Award	Category	Result	Won by	Note
2010	FHM Philippines	100 Sexiest Woman	Ranked No. 76	Angel Locsin (2)	
2011	FHM Philippines	100 Sexiest Woman	Ranked No. 88	Sam Pinto	
2012	FHM Philippines	100 Sexiest Woman	Ranked No. 86	Sam Pinto	
2013	FHM Philippines	100 Sexiest Woman	Ranked No. 20	Marian Rivera (2)	Appeared in July 2013 issue
2014	FHM Philippines	100 Sexiest Woman	Ranked No. 14	Marian Rivera (3)	
2015	FHM Philippines	100 Sexiest Woman	Ranked No. 10	Jennylyn Mercado	Myrtle Sarrosa is joining her for the top 100

=== Selected Career Highlights ===
Year	Award	Category	Result	Ref.
2007	Animax / Levi	Kawaii Girl Winner	Won	
2010	Costume Designers Guild	Hall Costume Award	Won	
2013	Chulo Magazine Awards	Sexiest Cosplay Model of the Year	Won	
2017	ToyCon Philippines	Pinoy Pop Culture Icon Award – Cosplay Queen	Won	
2018	Female Network	FN Life Peg	Won	
2020	CICP Spotlight Awards	Gaming Champion	Won	
2021	Village Pipol Online	Streamer of the Year	Won	
2022	Philippine Esports	Content Creator of the Year	Won	
2023	Asia Leaders Awards	Woman of Substance	Won	
2023	Philippine Esports	Lifetime Award	Won	
2026	ToyCon Philippines	Hall of Fame Award	Won	

=== Nominations/Finalist Placements ===
Year	Award	Category	Result	Ref
2009	Anime Festival Asia	Regional Cosplay Championship	Finalist (representing Philippines)	
2022	Village Pipol Choice Awards	Nominee – Cosplayer of the year	4th	
2023	Village Pipol Choice Awards	Nominee – Cosplayer of the year	5th	

Preceded by Jennylyn Mercado	FHM Cover Girl (July 2013)	Succeeded by Jinri Park
