= Spin (website) =

Philippine sports website

- Headquarters: Philippines
- Owners: Philippine Entertainment Portal, Inc. Summit Media
- Website: spin.ph
- Launched: June 5, 2012; 14 years ago

Spin (an initialism for Sports Interactive Network) is a Philippine sports website owned and operated by Philippine Entertainment Portal, Inc. and Summit Media. It was launched on June 5, 2012. It is the sister website of Philippine Entertainment Portal (PEP), Spot.ph, FHM Philippines (discontinued until 2018), and Top Gear Philippines (print discontinued until 2018).

== History ==
Spin was launched on June 5, 2012 by editor-in-chief Eduardo Catacutan Jr. On November 11, 2026, GMA Network Inc. ended the joint venture since 2007, and Summit Media took full ownership of PEP and Spin after established partnership by PlayTime Entertainment.
