= MPL Philippines =

Professional Esports League in the Philippines

- Current season, competition or edition: 2026 MPL Philippines season
- Game: Mobile Legends: Bang Bang
- First season: 2018
- Administrator: Moonton; MET Events; Grindsky Media (Season 10); Mineski Philippines (Season 11)
- Motto: "Lakas ng Pinas" (since Season 9) "Palag Na To"(since Season 17)
- No. of teams: 8 (2021–present)
- Country: Philippines
- Most recent champion: Aurora Gaming PH (18)
- Most titles: Team Liquid PH (4 titles)
- Broadcasters: One Sports (selected games only); ABS-CBN Sports and Action (Season 5); Net 25 (Seasons 8–10)
- Tournament format: Regular Season; Round robin (2018–present); Playoffs; Double elimination (2018–present)
- Website: ph-mpl.com

The Mobile Legends: Bang Bang Professional League Philippines, commonly known as MPL Philippines (MPL PH), is the premier professional esports league in the Philippines for the multiplayer online battle arena game (MOBA) Mobile Legends: Bang Bang.

The league was established in 2018 as one of the three founding MLBB professional leagues alongside MPL Indonesia and MPL MY/SG. Since Season 8, MPL Philippines operates under a franchise-based system, which consists of eight competing teams with the most recent addition being Team Falcons PH and Twisted Minds who replaced Blacklist International and RSG Philippines in Season 14. Aurora Gaming PH are the defending champions of the league, denying Team Liquid PH of their four-peat chance by defeating them in the lower bracket finals, and eventually getting the 4-2 win over 2nd seeded Team Falcons PH in their BO7 grand finals match in MPL Philippines Season 18.

In the international stage, teams from MPL Philippines have consistently dominated in sanctioned tournaments. The league has won six of the last seven world championship titles – with Aurora Gaming being the defending world champions – won four of the eight mid season cup titles with Team Liquid PH being the most recent Filipino champion, won all gold medals in the Southeast Asian Games for MLBB, and has produced several personalities and players that have been donned on by members of its community.

== History ==
=== Pre-Franchise Era (2018–2021) ===
In 2018, MPL Philippines was established as the premiere professional league for MLBB esports in the Philippines alongside its sister leagues in MPL Indonesia and formerly MPL MYSG (now MPL Malaysia). The first season featured ten regional teams qualifying to MPL Philippines Season 1 with Aether Main being the inaugural champions of MPL Philippines, defeating Digital Devils Pro in the finals 3–0. Later in the year, Aether Main went on to win the Mobile Legends: Bang Bang Southeast Asian Cup in Jakarta, Indonesia over a MPL Philippines grand finals rematch between the team and Digital Devils Pro. Aether Main would become the first team in the league to win an international trophy and brought the Philippines its first of four MSC titles.

This was immediately followed by Cignal Ultra who won Season 2 in a similar fashion, defeating the defending champion roster now under Bren Esports in the finals 3–1. Season 2 is the only MPL season to be held in two separate years being held from October 2018 to January 2019. Since the world championships were not incepted until the latter part of 2019, Season 2 became the only year thus far to not have an world championship tournament.

The third season was held in the middle of 2019 where MSC 2019 was to be held in the Philippines. Defending champions Cignal Ultra fell to Bren Esports in the lower bracket finals but ArkAngel defeated Bren in the Grand Finals 3–2. This is the first finals series that went all five games. ArkAngel and Bren would represent the Philippines in MSC 2019 only to have the country's worse performance in the MSC stage thus far.

The fourth season of MPL Philippines was held after and the champions and runner-up of MPL Philippines would qualify to the inaugural MLBB M1 World Championships in Kuala Lumpur, Malaysia. Sunsparks fended off a 2–1 deficit in the finals and won the Season 4 title 3–2 over ONIC Philippines. This would be the last full five-game series in the finals as the league slowly transitioned to a best-of-seven grand finals thereafter. Sunsparks and ONIC would however, falter in the inaugural season of Worlds.

The fifth season was the first season to be held during the COVID-19 pandemic as for the next few seasons, the league transitioned to an online based tournament. Season 5 would also see the first and only tournament thus far to not have an MSC tournament after the season after game developers Moonton cancelled the supposed offline tournament due to the pandemic and flight restrictions observed during this time. Sunsparks would make history as the first team to win back-to-back MPL championship titles and against the same opponent.

The sixth season was the first finals series that introduced the best-of-seven series. Bren Esports would qualify to the MLBB M2 World Championships and would win the team's first title after defeating Smart Omega 4–2 in the finals. Bren Esports would also make history as the first Filipino team to win the MLBB M2 World Championship title, giving the Philippines its first out of five titles in the tournament.

The seventh season was the last season to introduce the qualifier stage as in the next season, the league would transition to a full, franchise-based system. Blacklist International would come back from a 3–1 deficit in the grand finals to win the Season 7 title 4–3 over Execration. In the same year however, Execration would defeat Blacklist 4–1 in the MSC 2021 grand finals, the first all-Filipino finals in an international tournament.

=== Franchise Era (2021–present) ===
Season 8 onwards has transitioned the league to a franchise based system with eight teams competing in a brand new format and organization. Several notable teams like Execration have left the league with its roster being absorbed by Smart Omega. Blacklist International would become the second team to win back-to-back titles in MPL Philippines, defeating ONIC Philippines in the finals, 4–1. In the same year, Blacklist would win the MLBB M3 World Championship title in Singapore again against ONIC Philippines. Blacklist would bring the country its second of six world titles.

Season 9 saw the rise of RSG Philippines, the Singapore-based organization who also fueled teams in Malaysia and Singapore at the time. RSG would defeat the sixth-seed Smart Omega in the finals 4-1 and in the same year, defeating Indonesian powerhouse RRQ Hoshi in the MSC 2022 Grand Finals in a 4–0 sweep. RSG would bring the Philippines its third MSC title and its last for a brief period of time.

Season 10 then saw the resurgence of Blacklist International who finished 3–11 in the last season. Blacklist defeated the super team ECHO Philippines in the finals 4-2 and brought the franchise its third and last MPL Philippines title. ECHO, similarly to Execration, would seek their kryptonite title as they defeated Blacklist—who were vying to become the first team in MLBB history to go back-to-back world champions—in the MLBB M4 World Championship 4–0. ECHO brought the country's third world title.

Season 11 would rekindle a rivalry between Blacklist and ECHO as both teams were again in the finals for the second-consecutive year in a row, the second time that this had occurred since Sunsparks and ONIC Philippines in Season 4 and 5. ECHO would sweep Blacklist in the finals, winning the championship 4–0. However, it was Blacklist who would advance further in MSC 2023 advancing as far as the finals but was defeated 4–2 by Indonesian representatives ONIC Esports, the first grand finals defeat for a Filipino team in an international tournament.

Season 12 saw the revamped AP Bren (formerly Bren Esports) back in the finals for the first time since Season 6. AP Bren had lost several of its stars to retirement or to free agency but made a powerhouse team from local and holdover players. AP Bren defeated Blacklist International in the Grand Finals 4-1 and both teams qualified to the MLBB M5 World Championship hosted on home soil. AP Bren defeated ONIC Esports in their attempt for the "Golden Road" a term used for teams who would sweep an entire professional calendar year by winning their league's two championship splits and the two international tournaments of the same year. Bren defeated ONIC 4–3 in the finals and gave the Philippines its fourth world title.

Season 13 revived a rebranded ECHO Philippines, now Liquid ECHO for the tournament after Team Liquid's most recent acquisition of its parent company, Aura Esports. Liquid ECHO defeated defending champions AP Bren (known this time as Falcons AP Bren) in a 4–0 sweep, the first sweep since Season 11 which was also their championship year. Liquid ECHO and Falcons AP Bren qualified to MSC 2024 with Falcons AP Bren going to the finals against Malaysian representatives Selangor Red Giants, the first Malaysian representatives in an international tournament's grand finals series. SRG would shock the defending world champions after winning 4–3 in the finals, denying the Philippines' another MSC title.

Season 14 would see the resurgence of ONIC Philippines known as Fnatic ONIC Philippines at the time. The team would tie Blacklist International's Season 8 record of 13-1 and would hold the longest-win streak by any team at 13 games for any team in a single season. This would later be tied by Aurora Gaming in Season 16. Season 14 also saw the entry of the aforementioned Aurora Gaming to MPL Philippines after Minana EVOS' departure. FNOP defeated Aurora in the first full seven-game grand finals since Season 7 and won ONIC's first tile. In the same year, FNOP defeated Team Liquid Indonesia in the MLBB M6 World Championship and brought the Philippines its fifth world title.

Season 15 would produce three teams that won 10 games or more in a single season with Team Liquid (12–2), Aurora (12–2), and ONIC (10–4) being the top three teams. ONIC would pitch a potential back-to-back campaign but was denied by Team Liquid PH after they defeated ONIC 4–3 in the grand finals. Team Liquid held three MPL titles, tying Blacklist International's title count. Season 15 also saw the departures of Blacklist International and RSG Philippines as franchise teams and was replaced by Middle East powerhouse teams Team Falcons and Twisted Minds. In the same year, Team Liquid PH ended the Philippines' MSC title drought after defeating defending champions SRG OG Esports in the finals, 4–1.

Season 16 saw Aurora Gaming tie ONIC Philippines' 13–0 win streak record before their run was cut short by Team Liquid PH in the Grand Finals. Defending MSC champions Team Liquid PH advanced to their second straight finals as the third seed and delivered the league's first Grand Finals sweep since Season 13, defeating Aurora 4–0 to claim their third title in four tournaments and were well on their way to completing the "Golden Road." Team Liquid PH and Aurora Gaming represented the Philippines in the MLBB M7 World Championship where Team Liquid PH's path to the "Golden Road" was cut short after they were eliminated by MPL ID Runner-up Alter Ego who would eventually fall in the Grand Finals as Aurora Gaming wins its first ever championship, and the Philippines' sixth in seven world championships, in a 4-0 grand finals sweep. Aurora Gaming's MLBB M7 World Championship win also marks the second time an MPL runner up won the Championship and the first time that both grand finalists were runners-up of their respective home leagues.

Meanwhile, Season 16 also saw TNC Pro Team record its best finish since Season 9, placing third after defeating Twisted Minds and defending world champions ONIC PH in the lower bracket before falling to Team Liquid PH 4–1 in the semifinals.

Season 17 saw the first Indonesian import to the Philippines in Clayton "Savero" Kuswanto for Onic Philippines. Team Liquid PH would go three-consecutive seasons as the first seed, finishing 13–1 – their second consecutive 13-1 standing in the regular season – and becomes the first team in MPL Philippines history to go back to the finals for three-consecutive seasons. Liquid would be joined by Team Falcons PH – who got a regular season rebound to a 12-2 standing from their Season sixteen showing – and qualified to MSC 2026 to Paris. In MSC 2026, it was the worst performance by both Filipino representatives since 2019 where no Filipino teams advanced to the Grand Finals. Defending champions Team Liquid PH suffered an early playoff exit and Team Falcons PH getting bested in five games by Burmese champions Yangon Galacticos.

== Teams ==
Since the start of franchising, MPL Philippines is composed of eight teams. Of those eight teams, four joined during the pre-franchised era: AP Bren (as Bren Esports), Onic Philippines, Smart Omega, and Team Liquid PH (as Echo Philippines). Some teams also have a team captain, highlighted in bold in the table.

=== Current teams ===
Team	First season	Roster						Staff		
Team	First season	Exp	Jungler	Mid	Roamer	Gold	6th Man (Reserve)	Manager	Head coach	Asst. coach / Analyst
AP Bren	2018 (S2) (Note: Formerly known as Bren Esports (S2–S11) and Falcons AP Bren (S13–S14).)	JMPINKMAN	Jamespangks.	LanceCy	Escalera	Shizou	Allen	Adi	Bitoy	Yobabz
Aurora Gaming PH	2024 (S14)	Nathzz	Koyl	Yue	Light	Domeng	Yecs	Rada	Master The Basics	Dex Star
Onic Philippines	2019 (S4)	Kirk	K1NGKONG	SuperFrince	Super Yoshi	Savero	Dan; Brusko	Vacant	**Pheww**	Haze; Xy
Smart Omega	2021 (S6)	Louis	Raizen.	Minguin	Perkziva	Cull	Peuder	Rianne	Wurahhhh	Lembot
Team Falcons PH	2024 (S15)	Flap	Kyle	Hadji	**Owgwen**	Super Marco	Ferdz	Vacant	Ducky	Moody; VR3N
Team Liquid PH	2020 (S6) (Note: Formerly known as Aura Philippines (S6–S7), Echo Philippines (S8–S13), and Liquid Echo (S13).)	**Sanford**	KarlTzy	Sanji	Jaypee	Teddy	Daiki	Mitch	Aeon	SN4P
TNC Pro Team	2021 (S8)	Ryota	Zaida	Vinnn	Zehn	Jowm	Yeyeniya	Vacant	E2MAX	FindingHito
Twisted Minds PH	2024 (S15)	Lansu	Kayn	Sionnn	Tracyyy	Bennyqt	KURT	Vacant	Lyrick	Eson

=== Former teams ===
This list only includes teams that played during the franchised era.

Team	First season	Last season	Reason
Minana EVOS	2021 (S8)	2024 (S13)	Disbanded; slot acquired by Aurora Gaming
Blacklist International	2020 (S5)	2024 (S14)	Disbanded; slot acquired by either Team Falcons PH or Twisted Minds PH (Note: The entries of both Team Falcons PH and Twisted Minds PH were simultaneous. It is unclear which team acquired the slot of Blacklist International or RSG Philippines.)
RSG Philippines	2021 (S8)	2024 (S14)	Disbanded; slot acquired by either Team Falcons PH or Twisted Minds PH

== Results ==
	Season first seed
	MLBB Southeast Asia Cup / Mid Season Cup winner
†	MLBB World Championship winner

Year	Season	Champion	Runner-up	3rd place	4th place	Qualified for MSC		Qualified for M-Series	
2018	1	Aether Main	Digital Devils Pro	Obsidian Gaming	Invictus Godz	Aether Main	Digital Devils Pro	M-Series wasn't established	
2018	2	Cignal Ultra Esports	Bren Esports	Finesse Solid	SxC Imbalance	Aether Main	Digital Devils Pro	M-Series wasn't established	
2019	3	ArkAngel	Bren Esports	Cignal Ultra	EVOS Esports PH	ArkAngel	Bren Esports	Sunsparks	Onic Philippines
2019	4	Sunsparks	Onic Philippines	SGD Omega	Execration	ArkAngel	Bren Esports	Sunsparks	Onic Philippines
2020	5	Sunsparks	Onic Philippines	Bren Esports	Execration	Cancelled due to the COVID-19 pandemic		Bren Esports †	Smart Omega
2020	6	Bren Esports (Note: Bren Esports was the top seed in Group B in Season 6.)	Smart Omega	Execration (Note: Execration was the top seed in Group A in Season 6.)	Onic Philippines	Cancelled due to the COVID-19 pandemic		Bren Esports †	Smart Omega
2021	7	Blacklist International (Note: Blacklist International was the top seed in Group B in Season 7.)	Execration	Aura Philippines (Note: Aura Philippines was the top seed in Group A in Season 7.)	Bren Esports	Blacklist International	Execration	Blacklist International †	Onic Philippines
2021	8	Blacklist International	Onic Philippines	Smart Omega	Nexplay EVOS	Blacklist International	Execration	Blacklist International †	Onic Philippines
2022	9	RSG Philippines	Smart Omega	TNC Pro Team	Onic Philippines	RSG Philippines	Smart Omega	Blacklist International	Echo Philippines †
2022	10	Blacklist International	Echo Philippines	RSG Philippines	Bren Esports	RSG Philippines	Smart Omega	Blacklist International	Echo Philippines †
2023	11	Echo Philippines	Blacklist International	RSG Philippines	Bren Esports	Echo Philippines	Blacklist International	AP Bren †	Blacklist International
2023	12	AP Bren	Blacklist International	Echo Philippines	RSG Philippines	Echo Philippines	Blacklist International	AP Bren †	Blacklist International
2024	13	Team Liquid PH	AP Bren (Note: As Falcons AP Bren.)	RSG Philippines	Blacklist International	AP Bren	Team Liquid PH	Onic Philippines † (Note: As Fnatic Onic Philippines.)	Aurora Gaming
2024	14	Onic Philippines	Aurora Gaming	AP Bren	Blacklist International	AP Bren	Team Liquid PH	Onic Philippines †	Aurora Gaming
2025	15	Team Liquid PH	Onic Philippines	Team Falcons PH	Aurora Gaming PH	Team Liquid PH	Onic Philippines	Team Liquid PH	Aurora Gaming PH †
2025	16	Team Liquid PH	Aurora Gaming PH	TNC Pro Team	Onic Philippines	Team Liquid PH	Onic Philippines	Team Liquid PH	Aurora Gaming PH †
2026	17	Team Liquid PH	Team Falcons PH	Onic Philippines	Smart Omega	Team Liquid PH	Team Falcons PH	Aurora Gaming PH	Team Falcons PH
2026	18	Aurora Gaming PH	Team Falcons PH	Team Liquid PH	Onic Philippines	Team Liquid PH	Team Falcons PH	Aurora Gaming PH	Team Falcons PH

== Championships ==
	Present Franchise Teams.
(‡)	Former champion, franchise teams that have since disbanded.
(†)	Former champion, non-franchise teams that have since disbanded.

Organization	Team Name (Former Name/s)	Short Name	Wins	Loss	Total	Seasons Won	Seasons Lost
Team Liquid	Team Liquid PH	TLPH	5 (Note: League Record since winning MPL Philippines Season 16.)	1	6	Season 11 (Note: as ECHO Philippines), Season 13 (Note: as Liquid ECHO), Season 15–Season 17	Season 10
Team Liquid	ECHO Philippines	ECHO	5	1	6	Season 11, Season 13, Season 15–Season 17	Season 10
Team Liquid	Liquid ECHO	TLEC	5	1	6	Season 11, Season 13, Season 15–Season 17	Season 10
Tier One Entertainment	Blacklist International (‡)	BLCK	3	2	5	Season 7, Season 8, Season 10	Season 11, Season 12
Aces Pro Corporation	AP Bren	APBR	2	3	5	Season 6, Season 12	Season 2, Season 3, Season 13
Aces Pro Corporation	Bren Esports	BREN	2	3	5	Season 6, Season 12	Season 2, Season 3, Season 13
Aces Pro Corporation	Falcons AP Bren	FCAP	2	3	5	Season 6, Season 12	Season 2, Season 3, Season 13
Bren Esports (Note: SunSparks was acquired by Bren Esports through its MLBB roster in Season 6. However, the organization had remained under Bren Esports as a White Label Team where SunSparks remains as the organization's name but Bren manages the operations behind the scenes.)	Sunsparks (†)	SS	2	0	2	Season 4, Season 5	—
Aurora Gaming	Aurora Gaming PH	RORA	1	3	4	Season 18	Season 14, Season 16
Onic Esports	ONIC Philippines	ONIC PH	1	4	5	Season 14	Season 4, Season 5, Season 8, Season 15
Onic Esports	Fnatic ONIC Philippines	FNOP	1	4	5	Season 14	Season 4, Season 5, Season 8, Season 15
Resurgence	RSG Philippines (‡)	RSG PH	1	0	1	Season 9	—
Resurgence	RSG Slate PH	RSG PH	1	0	1	Season 9	—
Cignal TV	Cignal Ultra (†)	CIG	1	0	1	Season 2	—
—	Aether Main (†)	AE	1	0	1	Season 1	—
—	ArkAngel (†)	AA	1	0	1	Season 3	—
—	Digital Devils Pro (†)	DD	0	1	1	—	Season 1
Team Falcons	Team Falcons PH	FLCN	0	2	2	—	Season 17, Season 18
Smart Communications	Smart Omega	OMG	0	2	2	—	Season 6, Season 9
TNC Predator	TNC Pro Team	TNC	0	0	0	—	—
Twisted Minds	Twsited Minds PH	TWIS	0	0	0	—	—

Non-highlighted cells under the Team Name Column represents that specific team's former branding and team name during the duration of MPL Philippines in past seasons.

== Awards ==
=== Individual awards ===
The number in the parenthesis denotes the number of times the player won the award in the column.

Seasons 1 to 17

Many of the awards from MPL Philippines revolved around the Most Valuable Player through Rookie of the Season, and has been the continual award roster for MPL Philippines professional players since then.

Year	Season	Awards					
Year	Season	Most Valuable Player	Team	Finals MVP	Team	Rookie of the Season	Team
2018	1	Ribo	Aether Main	Ribo	Aether Main	—N/a	
2018	2	Yuji	Bren Esports	Pheww	Cignal Ultra	—N/a	
2019	3	Yuji (2)	Bren Esports	Ryo	Arkangel	—N/a	
2019	4	Jaypee	Sunsparks	—N/a		—N/a	
2020	5	—N/a		Kielvj	Sunsparks	—N/a	
2020	6	—N/a		KarlTzy	Bren Esports	—N/a	
2021	7	—N/a		Edward	Blacklist International	Kelra	Smart Omega
2021	8	Hadji	Blacklist International	Hadji	Blacklist International	Demonkite	RSG Philippines
2022	9	Light	RSG Philippines	Nathzz	RSG Philippines	Escalera	TNC Pro Team
2022	10	OhMyV33Nus	Blacklist International	Edward (2)	Blacklist International	KyleTzy	AP Bren
2023	11	Owgwen	AP Bren	Sanford	Echo Philippines	Yue	Blacklist International
2023	12	KarlTzy	Echo Philippines	FlapTzy	AP Bren	M4tt	Smart Omega
2024	13	Super Marco	Falcons AP Bren	Sanford (2)	Liquid Echo	Nomed	TNC Pro Team
2024	14	K1NGKONG	Fnatic Onic Philippines	Kelra	Fnatic Onic Philippines	—N/a	
2025	15	Oheb	Team Liquid PH	Sanji	Team Liquid PH	—N/a	
2025	16	Light (2)	Aurora Gaming PH	Jaypee	Team Liquid PH	Sionnn	Twisted Minds PH
2026	17	KarlTzy (2)	Team Liquid PH	Sanford (3)	Team Liquid PH	—N/a	

Season 18

With the recent return of many Filipino professional players in the MPL Philippines scene, individual awards have been introduced including Comeback Player of the Season, Most Improved Player of the Season, and Rising Star of the Season.

Year	Season	Awards									
Year	Season	Regular Season MVP	Team	Finals MVP	Team	Most Improved Player	Team	Comeback Player of the Season	Team	Rising Star of the Season	Team
2026	18	Jaypee	Team Liquid PH	Domeng	Aurora Gaming PH	Domeng	Aurora Gaming PH	Nathzz	Aurora Gaming PH	Cull	Smart Omega

=== All-Star Team ===
	Denotes the player who won Most Valuable Player in the same year
	Denotes the player who won Finals Most Valuable Player in the same year
	Denotes the player both Most Valuable Player awards in the same year
(#)	Indicates the number of times the player was selected for the All-Star Team. (Note: All-Star Team and Fans' Choice selections are counted separately.)

==== Seasons 6 to 13 ====
Season 6 was the first time the league awarded a Team of the Season and through Season 13, only one such team is named except for Season 7 which wasn't awarded at all.

Year	Season	Positions	Players	Teams	Ref.
2020	6	Exp	Killuash	Aura Philippines	
2020	6	Jungler	KarlTzy	Bren Esports	
2020	6	Mid	Pheww	Bren Esports	
2020	6	Gold	Ribo	Bren Esports	
2020	6	Roamer	Ch4knu	Execration	
2021	7	Not awarded			
2021	8	Exp	Edward	Blacklist International	
2021	8	Jungler	Kairi	ONIC Philippines	
2021	8	Mid	OhMyV33Nus	Blacklist International	
2021	8	Gold	Oheb	Blacklist International	
2021	8	Roamer	Hadji	Blacklist International	
2022	9	Exp	Nathzz	RSG Philippines	
2022	9	Jungler	Demonkite	RSG Philippines	
2022	9	Mid	Aqua	RSG Philippines	
2022	9	Gold	Kelra	Smart Omega	
2022	9	Roamer	Light	RSG Philippines	
2022	10	Exp	Edward (2)	Blacklist International	
2022	10	Jungler	Wise	Blacklist International	
2022	10	Mid	OhMyV33Nus (2)	Blacklist International	
2022	10	Gold	Super Marco	Bren Esports	
2022	10	Roamer	Hadji (2)	Blacklist International	
2023	11	Exp	Sanford	Echo Philippines	
2023	11	Jungler	KarlTzy (2)	Echo Philippines	
2023	11	Mid	Sanji	Echo Philippines	
2023	11	Gold	Bennyqt	Echo Philippines	
2023	11	Roamer	Yawi	Echo Philippines	
2023	12	Exp	Edward (3)	Blacklist International	
2023	12	Jungler	KarlTzy (3)	Echo Philippines	
2023	12	Mid	Sanji (2)	Echo Philippines	
2023	12	Gold	Kelra (2)	Smart Omega	
2023	12	Roamer	Owgwen	Bren Esports	
2024	13	Exp	Nathzz (2)	RSG Philippines	
2024	13	Jungler	KyleTzy	AP Bren	
2024	13	Mid	Sanji (3)	Team Liquid PH	
2024	13	Gold	Super Marco (2)	AP Bren	
2024	13	Roamer	Owgwen (2)	AP Bren	

==== Season 14 to present ====
Starting from Season 14, the award was renamed to the All-Star Team and is divided into two. The league also added a third, fan-voted All-Star Team known as the Fans' Choice All-Star Team.

Year	Season	Positions	Team 1		Team 2		Fans' Choice		Ref.
Year	Season	Positions	Players	Teams	Players	Teams	Players	Teams	Ref.
2024	14	Exp	FlapTzy	AP Bren	Sanford	Team Liquid PH	Edward	Aurora Gaming	
2024	14	Jungler	K1NGKONG	Onic Philippines	Andoryuuu	Smart Omega	Demonkite (2)	Aurora Gaming	
2024	14	Mid	Super Frince	Onic Philippines	Pheww (2)	AP Bren	Yue	Aurora Gaming	
2024	14	Gold	Kelra (3)	Onic Philippines	Super Marco (3)	AP Bren	Kelra	Onic Philippines	
2024	14	Roamer	Ch4knu (2)	Smart Omega	Renejay	Aurora Gaming	Ch4knu	Smart Omega	
2025	15	Exp	Sanford	Team Liquid PH	Edward (4)	Aurora Gaming PH	Kirk	Onic Philippines	
2025	15	Jungler	KarlTzy (4)	Team Liquid PH	K1NGKONG	Onic Philippines	K1NGKONG	Onic Philippines	
2025	15	Mid	Super Frince (2)	Onic Philippines	Yue	Aurora Gaming PH	Super Frince	Onic Philippines	
2025	15	Gold	Oheb (2)	Team Liquid PH	Kelra (4)	Onic Philippines	Kelra (2)	Onic Philippines	
2025	15	Roamer	Renejay (2)	Aurora Gaming	Brusko	Onic Philippines	Brusko	Onic Philippines	
2025	16	Exp	Edward (5)	Aurora Gaming PH	Sanford	Team Liquid PH	Kirk (2)	Onic Philippines	
2025	16	Jungler	KarlTzy (5)	Team Liquid PH	Demonkite (2)	Aurora Gaming PH	K1NGKONG (2)	Onic Philippines	
2025	16	Mid	Yue (2)	Aurora Gaming PH	Super Frince (3)	Onic Philippines	Super Frince (2)	Onic Philippines	
2025	16	Gold	Domengkite	Aurora Gaming PH	Kelra (5)	Onic Philippines	Kelra (3)	Onic Philippines	
2025	16	Roamer	Light (2)	Aurora Gaming PH	Jaypee	Team Liquid PH	Brusko (2)	Onic Philippines	
2026	17	Exp	Sanford (2)	Team Liquid PH	Flap	Team Falcons PH	Kirk (3)	Onic Philippines	
2026	17	Jungler	KarlTzy (6)	Team Liquid PH	Kyle	Team Falcons PH	K1NGKONG (3)	Onic Philippines	
2026	17	Mid	Sanji (4)	Team Liquid PH	Super Frince (4)	Onic Philippines	Super Frince (3)	Onic Philippines	
2026	17	Gold	Super Marco (4)	Team Falcons PH	Savero	Onic Philippines	Savero	Onic Philippines	
2026	17	Roamer	Jaypee (2)	Team Liquid PH	Owgwen	Team Falcons PH	Brusko (3)	Onic Philippines	
2026	18	Exp	Sanford (3)	Team Liquid PH	Flap (2)	Team Falcons PH	Kirk (4)	Onic Philippines	
2026	18	Jungler	KarlTzy (7)	Team Liquid PH	Kyle (2)	Team Falcons PH	K1NGKONG (4)	Onic Philippines	
2026	18	Mid	Sanji (5)	Team Liquid PH	Super Frince (5)	Onic Philippines	Super Frince (4)	Onic Philippines	
2026	18	Gold	Super Marco (5)	Team Falcons PH	Domeng	Aurora Gaming PH	Savero (2)	Onic Philippines	
2026	18	Roamer	Jaypee (3)	Team Liquid PH	Owgwen (2)	Team Falcons PH	Brusko (4)	Onic Philippines	

==== Most selections ====
The following table only lists players with at least three total selections, excluding Fan's Choice selections.

Player	Position	Total	Team 1	Team 2
KarlTzy	Jungle	7	7	0
Sanford	Exp	6	4	2
Edward	Exp	5	4	1
Kelra	Gold	5	3	2
Super Frince	Mid	5	2	3
Super Marco	Gold	5	4	1
Sanji	Mid	5	5	0
Pheww	Mid	3	3	0

== MPL Philippines Hall of Legends ==
In commemoration of the tenth season of MPL Philippines, on September 5, 2022, MPL Philippines announced that the nominations for the ten new inductees for the Hall of Legends were officially opened. The nominations and voting process lasted for an entire month and two days, ending on October 7, 2022.

On Sunday, October 23, 2022, the official inductees were announced on stage before the introduction of the Grand Finalists for MPL Philippines Season 10. The inductees were announced by the following:

Year	Season	Name	IGN	Teams		Achievements
2022	Season 10	Im Chang-Rok	Coach Panda	Arkangel	2018-2020	2x MPL Philippines Champion (S3, S9); 1x MSC Champion (2021)
2022	Season 10	Im Chang-Rok	Coach Panda	PlayBook Esports	2020-2021	2x MPL Philippines Champion (S3, S9); 1x MSC Champion (2021)
2022	Season 10	Im Chang-Rok	Coach Panda	RSG Philippines	2021–2025	2x MPL Philippines Champion (S3, S9); 1x MSC Champion (2021)
2022	Season 10	Im Chang-Rok	Coach Panda	Bigetron by Vitalty	2026–present	2x MPL Philippines Champion (S3, S9); 1x MSC Champion (2021)
2022	Season 10	Christian Fajura	Rafflesia	BREN No Limit	2019	2x MPL Philippines Champion (S4, S5); 1x The Nationals Champion (2020)
2022	Season 10	Christian Fajura	Rafflesia	Sunsparks	2019-2020	2x MPL Philippines Champion (S4, S5); 1x The Nationals Champion (2020)
2022	Season 10	Christian Fajura	Rafflesia	Team Liquid PH	2020-2022	2x MPL Philippines Champion (S4, S5); 1x The Nationals Champion (2020)
2022	Season 10	Christian Fajura	Rafflesia	Pendekar Esports	2023–2024	2x MPL Philippines Champion (S4, S5); 1x The Nationals Champion (2020)
2022	Season 10	Christian Fajura	Rafflesia	TODAK	2024–2025	2x MPL Philippines Champion (S4, S5); 1x The Nationals Champion (2020)
2022	Season 10	Christian Fajura	Rafflesia	Alpha7 Esports	2025	2x MPL Philippines Champion (S4, S5); 1x The Nationals Champion (2020)
2022	Season 10	Joshua Mangilog	Ch4knu	Execration	2019-2021	1x MSC Champion (2020)
2022	Season 10	Joshua Mangilog	Ch4knu	Omega Esports	2021–2024; 2024–2025	1x MSC Champion (2020)
2022	Season 10	Joshua Mangilog	Ch4knu	Omega Neos	2024	1x MSC Champion (2020)
2022	Season 10	Joshua Mangilog	Ch4knu	TNC Pro Team	2025–2026	1x MSC Champion (2020)
2022	Season 10	Jeniel Bata-Anon	Haze	Aether Main	2018	1x MLBB World Champion (M6); 2x MPL Philippines Champion (S1, S14); 1x MSC Champion (2018); 2x The Nationals Champions (2019)
2022	Season 10	Jeniel Bata-Anon	Haze	Bren Esports	2018-2019	1x MLBB World Champion (M6); 2x MPL Philippines Champion (S1, S14); 1x MSC Champion (2018); 2x The Nationals Champions (2019)
2022	Season 10	Jeniel Bata-Anon	Haze	SGD Omega	2019-2020	1x MLBB World Champion (M6); 2x MPL Philippines Champion (S1, S14); 1x MSC Champion (2018); 2x The Nationals Champions (2019)
2022	Season 10	Jeniel Bata-Anon	Haze	Omega Esports	2020-2021	1x MLBB World Champion (M6); 2x MPL Philippines Champion (S1, S14); 1x MSC Champion (2018); 2x The Nationals Champions (2019)
2022	Season 10	Jeniel Bata-Anon	Haze	Nexplay EVOS	2021-2023	1x MLBB World Champion (M6); 2x MPL Philippines Champion (S1, S14); 1x MSC Champion (2018); 2x The Nationals Champions (2019)
2022	Season 10	Jeniel Bata-Anon	Haze	Minana EVOS (as Coach & Player)	2023–2024	1x MLBB World Champion (M6); 2x MPL Philippines Champion (S1, S14); 1x MSC Champion (2018); 2x The Nationals Champions (2019)
2022	Season 10	Jeniel Bata-Anon	Haze	ONIC Philippines	2024–present	1x MLBB World Champion (M6); 2x MPL Philippines Champion (S1, S14); 1x MSC Champion (2018); 2x The Nationals Champions (2019)
2022	Season 10	Setsuna Ignacio	AkoSi Dogie	Aether Main	2018	1x MPL Philippines Champion (S1)
2022	Season 10	Setsuna Ignacio	AkoSi Dogie	Nexplay EVOS	2019-2023	1x MPL Philippines Champion (S1)
2022	Season 10	Setsuna Ignacio	AkoSi Dogie	Minana EVOS (as Manager)	2023	1x MPL Philippines Champion (S1)
2022	Season 10	Setsuna Ignacio	AkoSi Dogie	TNC Pro Team	2024–2025	1x MPL Philippines Champion (S1)
2022	Season 10	Karl Gabriel Nepomunceno	KarlTzy	Finesse Solid	2018	2x SEA Games Gold Medalist (2019, 2025); 2x MLBB World Champion (M2, M4); 5x MPL Philippines Champion (S6, S11, S13, S15, S16); 1x MPL Philippines Finals MVP (S6); 1x MLBB Worlds Finals MVP (M2)
2022	Season 10	Karl Gabriel Nepomunceno	KarlTzy	SGD Omega	2018-2019	2x SEA Games Gold Medalist (2019, 2025); 2x MLBB World Champion (M2, M4); 5x MPL Philippines Champion (S6, S11, S13, S15, S16); 1x MPL Philippines Finals MVP (S6); 1x MLBB Worlds Finals MVP (M2)
2022	Season 10	Karl Gabriel Nepomunceno	KarlTzy	Bren Esports	2020-2021	2x SEA Games Gold Medalist (2019, 2025); 2x MLBB World Champion (M2, M4); 5x MPL Philippines Champion (S6, S11, S13, S15, S16); 1x MPL Philippines Finals MVP (S6); 1x MLBB Worlds Finals MVP (M2)
2022	Season 10	Karl Gabriel Nepomunceno	KarlTzy	Team Liquid PH	2021–present	2x SEA Games Gold Medalist (2019, 2025); 2x MLBB World Champion (M2, M4); 5x MPL Philippines Champion (S6, S11, S13, S15, S16); 1x MPL Philippines Finals MVP (S6); 1x MLBB Worlds Finals MVP (M2)
2022	Season 10	Carlito Ribo Jr.	Ribo	Aether Main	2018	1x SEA Games Gold Medalist (2019); 1x MLBB World Champion (M2); 2x MPL Philippines Champion (S1, S6); 1x The Nationals Champion (2020); 1x MPL Philippines Finals MVP (S1); 1x MPL Philippines Regular Season MVP (S1)
2022	Season 10	Carlito Ribo Jr.	Ribo	Bren Esports	2018-2022	1x SEA Games Gold Medalist (2019); 1x MLBB World Champion (M2); 2x MPL Philippines Champion (S1, S6); 1x The Nationals Champion (2020); 1x MPL Philippines Finals MVP (S1); 1x MPL Philippines Regular Season MVP (S1)
2022	Season 10	Carlito Ribo Jr.	Ribo	Z4 Esports	2022	1x SEA Games Gold Medalist (2019); 1x MLBB World Champion (M2); 2x MPL Philippines Champion (S1, S6); 1x The Nationals Champion (2020); 1x MPL Philippines Finals MVP (S1); 1x MPL Philippines Regular Season MVP (S1)
2022	Season 10	Carlito Ribo Jr.	Ribo	ZOL Esports	2022-2023	1x SEA Games Gold Medalist (2019); 1x MLBB World Champion (M2); 2x MPL Philippines Champion (S1, S6); 1x The Nationals Champion (2020); 1x MPL Philippines Finals MVP (S1); 1x MPL Philippines Regular Season MVP (S1)
2022	Season 10	Carlito Ribo Jr.	Ribo	Omega Esports	2023–2024	1x SEA Games Gold Medalist (2019); 1x MLBB World Champion (M2); 2x MPL Philippines Champion (S1, S6); 1x The Nationals Champion (2020); 1x MPL Philippines Finals MVP (S1); 1x MPL Philippines Regular Season MVP (S1)
2022	Season 10	Danerie James Del Rosario	Wise.	ONIC Philippines	2019-2020	1x MLBB World Champion (M3); 3x MPL Philippines Champion (S7, S8, S10); 1x SEA Games Gold Medalist (2021); 1x IESF Silver Medalist (2021)
2022	Season 10	Danerie James Del Rosario	Wise.	Blacklist International	2020–2024	1x MLBB World Champion (M3); 3x MPL Philippines Champion (S7, S8, S10); 1x SEA Games Gold Medalist (2021); 1x IESF Silver Medalist (2021)
2022	Season 10	Danerie James Del Rosario	Wise.	Aurora Gaming	2024–2026	1x MLBB World Champion (M3); 3x MPL Philippines Champion (S7, S8, S10); 1x SEA Games Gold Medalist (2021); 1x IESF Silver Medalist (2021)
2022	Season 10	Danerie James Del Rosario	Wise.	TNC Pro Team	2026	1x MLBB World Champion (M3); 3x MPL Philippines Champion (S7, S8, S10); 1x SEA Games Gold Medalist (2021); 1x IESF Silver Medalist (2021)
2022	Season 10	Johnmar Villaluna	OhMyV33Nus	ONIC Philippines	2019-2020	1x MLBB World Champion (M3); 3x MPL Philippines Champion (S7, S8, S10); 1x MPL Philippines Regular Season MVP (S10); 1x SEA Games Gold Medalist (2021); 1x IESF Silver Medalist (2021)
2022	Season 10	Johnmar Villaluna	OhMyV33Nus	Blacklist International	2020–2024	1x MLBB World Champion (M3); 3x MPL Philippines Champion (S7, S8, S10); 1x MPL Philippines Regular Season MVP (S10); 1x SEA Games Gold Medalist (2021); 1x IESF Silver Medalist (2021)
2022	Season 10	Johnmar Villaluna	OhMyV33Nus	Aurora Gaming	2024–2026	1x MLBB World Champion (M3); 3x MPL Philippines Champion (S7, S8, S10); 1x MPL Philippines Regular Season MVP (S10); 1x SEA Games Gold Medalist (2021); 1x IESF Silver Medalist (2021)
2022	Season 10	Johnmar Villaluna	OhMyV33Nus	TNC Pro Team	2026	1x MLBB World Champion (M3); 3x MPL Philippines Champion (S7, S8, S10); 1x MPL Philippines Regular Season MVP (S10); 1x SEA Games Gold Medalist (2021); 1x IESF Silver Medalist (2021)
2022	Season 11	Edward Jay Dapadap	EDWARD	Blacklist International	2020–2024	2x MLBB World Champion (M3, M7); 3x MPL Philippines Champion (S7, S8, S10); 2x MPL Philippines Finals MVP (S7, S10); 1x SEA Games Gold Medalist (2021); 1x IESF Silver Medalist (2021)
2022	Season 11	Edward Jay Dapadap	EDWARD	Aurora Gaming	2024–2026	2x MLBB World Champion (M3, M7); 3x MPL Philippines Champion (S7, S8, S10); 2x MPL Philippines Finals MVP (S7, S10); 1x SEA Games Gold Medalist (2021); 1x IESF Silver Medalist (2021)
2023	Season 12	Francis Glindro	Coach Duckyyy	AP Bren	2020–2025	2x MLBB World Champion (M2, M5); 2x MPL Philippines Champion (S6, S12); 2023 SEA Games Gold Medalist; IESF World Esports Champions (2023); 2024 Games of the Future Champion
2023	Season 12	Francis Glindro	Coach Duckyyy	Team Falcons PH	2025–present	2x MLBB World Champion (M2, M5); 2x MPL Philippines Champion (S6, S12); 2023 SEA Games Gold Medalist; IESF World Esports Champions (2023); 2024 Games of the Future Champion
2024	Season 13	David Canon	Flap	AP Bren	2019–2025	2x MLBB World Champion (M2, M5); 1x MLBB World Finals MVP (M5); 2x MPL Philippines Champion (S6, S12); 1x MPL Philippines Finals MVP (S12); 2023 SEA Games Gold Medalist; IESF World Esports Champions (2023); 2024 Games of the Future Champion
2024	Season 13	David Canon	Flap	Team Falcons PH	2025–present	2x MLBB World Champion (M2, M5); 1x MLBB World Finals MVP (M5); 2x MPL Philippines Champion (S6, S12); 1x MPL Philippines Finals MVP (S12); 2023 SEA Games Gold Medalist; IESF World Esports Champions (2023); 2024 Games of the Future Champion
2024	Season 13	Kairi Rayosdelsol	Kairi	Blacklist International	2021	1x MLBB MSC Champion (2023); 6x MPL Indonesia Champion (S10-S13, S15, S16); 2x MPL Indonesia Finals MVP (S10, S16); 2x MPL Indonesian Regular Season MVP (S10, S12); 1x MPLI Champions (2022)
2024	Season 13	Kairi Rayosdelsol	Kairi	ONIC Philippines	2021–2022	1x MLBB MSC Champion (2023); 6x MPL Indonesia Champion (S10-S13, S15, S16); 2x MPL Indonesia Finals MVP (S10, S16); 2x MPL Indonesian Regular Season MVP (S10, S12); 1x MPLI Champions (2022)
2024	Season 13	Kairi Rayosdelsol	Kairi	ONIC Esports	2022–present	1x MLBB MSC Champion (2023); 6x MPL Indonesia Champion (S10-S13, S15, S16); 2x MPL Indonesia Finals MVP (S10, S16); 2x MPL Indonesian Regular Season MVP (S10, S12); 1x MPLI Champions (2022)

An extra inductee was announced onstage when Manjean Faldas was to become the eleventh member of the Hall of Legends. Faldas has been part of MPL Philippines and has been casting MPL Philippines games since Season 1 and is widely known for his tandem partner "ManjeanBoo" at the time together with Shin boo "Shinboo" Ponferrada .

Full Name	IGN	Role
Manjean Faldas	Manjean	MPL Philippines Caster

== MDL Philippines ==
MDL Philippines is the developmental league for MPL Philippines. The league was established in 2023 and includes both MPL academy teams and independent teams.

== Rivalries ==
=== Sunsparks-ONIC Philippines ===
Sunsparks and ONIC Philippines had one of the most-anticipated Grand Finals during Seasons 4 and 5 and a rivalry between both teams led up to their back-to-back appearances in the Finals. ONIC was led by the "Royal Duo" Johnmar "OhMyV33Nus" Villaluna and Daneire James "Wise" Del Rosario during this time meanwhile Sunsparks had the services of current MPL players Kiel "KielVJ" Cruzem, Christian "Rafflesia" Fajura, Renz "RENZIO" Cadua and ECHO's Jaypee "Jaypee" Cruz. Both ONIC and Sunsparks topped the Season 4 Regular Season standings, each having an 8–1 record. Despite having a higher plus/minus differential for Sunsparks, ONIC was able to top the standings.

In the Season 4 Grand Finals, ONIC Philippines were poised to take Game 3 for their first title. However, Sunsparks would win the game after a counter save by Sunsparks' Rafflesia. This gave the ability for the team's Minions to reach the base while members of ONIC Philippines were pushing the mid-lane, sending the series to Game 5. Sunsparks would ultimately win Game 5 and their first of two organization titles for MPL Philippines.

Season 5 would see a rematch between Sunsparks and ONIC Philippines. Sunsparks had an 8–1 record while ONIC placed third with a 7–2 record. After an altercation in Game 3 in the Upper-Brackets, ONIC would crawl their way back to the Finals from the Lower-Brackets to face a rematch with Sunsparks. It is worth to point out that ONIC Philippines' roamer Allen "Baloyskie" Baloy (formerly known as Greed) switched teams during the offseason and joined Sunsparks. Meanwhile, Sunsparks' former Roamer Cedric "Fuzaken" Pasusani joined ONIC.

Sunsparks would dismantle ONIC Philippines in their last altercation, becoming the first organization in MPL history to win back-to-back titles. Sunsparks would see their roster be acquired by AURA Philippines (now: ECHO Philippines) while ONIC Philippines continued to be one of the eight franchises of MPL Philippines.

=== Blacklist International-Smart Omega ===
Dubbed as the "El Clasico" rivalry, Blacklist International and Smart Omega's rivalry starts when the Omega roster was still under Execration.

In Season 7, Blacklist dominated the group stage, going 12–1 while Execration was tied for second with a 6–7 record. Both teams have competed against each other since Season 6, however, their prevalent rivalry was more detailed during Season 7.

Blacklist International was able to secure a Grand Finals position and an MSC appearance after a 3–2 victory over AP Bren and a 3–1 victory over AURA. Execration meanwhile, had to start from the Lower Bracket Eliminations before crawling their way to the Grand Finals. Execration led the series 3–1 in the build up to Game 5. However, Blacklist would upset Execration and would win their first of three organization title in history.

Execration and Blacklist International set up a PH vs. PH Finals in MSC 2021. Execration would maintain their momentum in a 3–1 lead and would eventually win their final international title as an Organization under the brand Execration when they defeated Blacklist.

In Season 8, Execration left the MPL Philippines scene and the roster was eventually relinquished. Smart Omega eSports relinquished its own members and the organization would acquire the Execration roster leading up to MPL Philippines Season 8. Meanwhile, Salic "Hadji" Imam, Omega's Jungler would join Blacklist International during the offseason. This would compete the eventual "MV3" trio which included Edward "Edward" Dapadap and Kiel "Oheb" Soriano. Both teams would be caught in different situations regarding their players, most notably was Soriano lifting his middle finger after the conclusion of the second leg of Blacklist vs. Omega in the regular season, in which Soriano was penalized and subsequently suspended for the team's first series in the playoffs.

Blacklist would still cruise with a 13–1 record while Omega settled for fourth with a 5–9 record. After a 3–1 victory over ECHO, Omega would surprise the defending champions after they defeated them 3 games to 1. However, Blacklist would rebound and defeat Omega in a 3–1 series in the Lower-Bracket Finals which eventually led to Blacklist winning both MPL Philippines Season 8 and the MLBB M3 World Championships.

Omega would dismantle Blacklist during the proceeding season, defying them a playoff spot and subsequently ending their playoff-run. Omega would still rank sixth overall, but would dominate the playoffs, sweeping ECHO's super team in the Quarterfinals. Despite dropping to the lower-brackets after a 3–1 defeat to TNC, Omega would sweep the Kairi-led ONIC Philippines squad and sweep their rematch game against TNC Pro Team to clinch a Grand Finals spot for the first time since Season 6. Unfortunately, Omega would lose 4–1 to RSG in the Finals.

=== Bren Esports-Cignal Ultra ===
Two of the oldest teams in the league prior to Season 8, AP Bren (formerly known as Bren Esports and Aether Main) and Cignal Ultra (formerly known as Digital Devil Pro Team) were the original teams who've longed dominated MPL Philippines prior to the introduction of Blacklist, RSG and ECHO. Their rivalry extends to Season 2 where Bren and CG met for the first and last time in the Grand Finals stage. Bren Esports topped the Regular Season with a 7–2; 15–5 record while Cignal Ultra tied for second with a 6–3; 13–10 record.

Bren Esports initially 2–0 Cignal Ultra in the Upper-Bracket Finals and gave them a shot for the MPL Title, however, Cignal Ultra would rematch Bren in the Finals and won in four games. Both teams rematched in the playoffs once again, but Bren would advance to the Finals against Arkangel after dismantling the defending champions.

=== Execration-Nexplay EVOS ===
Members of both Execration and Nexplay EVOS were not shy when it comes to taunting the other team's players. Both teams have their heated share of taunts from one series to the other. This stretched all the way to Season 1 because of how Setsuna "AkoSiDogie" Ignacio and Billy "Z4PNU" Alfonso perceived their roster of players and how any of them could surpass the other to greatness. Ignacio's belt includes an MPL title for Season 1 and a MSC 2018 title while Alfonso holds an MSC title of his own from his players.
