= MPL Philippines Season 10 =

Esports tournament

- 2022

Tournament information
- Game: Mobile Legends: Bang Bang
- Location: Philippines
- Dates: August 12–October 23, 2022
- Administrator: Moonton
- Tournament format(s): Double round-robin tournament (Regular season); Double-elimination tournament (Playoffs)
- Venue(s): ICite Building Auditorium, Bagumbayan, Quezon City (Regular season)
- Teams: 8
- Purse: US$150,000

Final positions
- Champions: Blacklist International (3rd title)
- 1st runners-up: ECHO Philippines
- 2nd runners-up: RSG Philippines

Tournament statistics
- MVP: Johnmar "OhMyV33Nus" Villaluna (Blacklist International)
- Finals MVP: Edward Jay "EDWARD" Dapadap (Blacklist International)
- Rookie of the Season: Michael "KyleTzy" Sayson (Bren Esports)
- Best Casters/Panelist: Chantelle "Chantelle" Hernandez (Tagalog); Joseph Charles "Naisou" Rezabek (English)

The MPL Philippines Season 10 is the tenth season of the MPL Philippines. The season began on August 12, 2022, and ended on October 23, 2022. The season served as the Philippine Qualifiers for the MLBB M4 World Championships slated on January 1–15, 2023. It was won by Blacklist International.

== Venues and Competition Format ==
=== Venue ===
After the league runs online for two years due to the COVID-19 pandemic, the league has opened doors to the live audience which began last August 12. However, the league has set some rules for the fans who wish to witness the games personally. Fans must present proof of vaccination and return a negative antigen test result in the day they wish to witness the games. 90 fans can be accommodated for Fridays and Sundays, 70 fans can be accommodated for Saturdays.

The games for the regular season are being held in iCite Auditorium, Bagumbayan, Quezon City.

=== Competition format ===
Similar to the previous season, 8 teams will compete in a double round-robin elimination and only the Top 6 teams will qualify for the playoffs. However, the first and third-placed teams will have the advantage of selecting matchups in the play-in rounds. Only the Grand Finalists will represent the Philippines in the upcoming MLBB M4 World Championships.

== Regular season ==
The regular season began on August 12, 2022, and will end on October 03, 2022. The regular season are a double round-robin format, with each team playing against their opponents twice, for a total of 14 games being played per team. A total of three group stage points may be earned in a single regular season match, based on the following:

- If the match is decided by a 2–0 score, the winner shall earn 3 group stage points, while the loser earns 0 group stage points.
- If the match is decided by a 2–1 score, the winner shall earn 2 group stage points, while the loser earns 1 group stage point.

The top two teams of the standings gained outright qualification to the Upper Bracket Semifinals, while the next four teams qualified for the play-ins.

On September 24, 2022, the league announced the suspension of games scheduled for September 25 (Week 7-Day 3), in light of the onslaught of Typhoon Karding (international name: Typhoon Noru), which had hit different parts of Luzon. However, it was announced that suspended games due to the typhoon are rescheduled on October 03, 2022, which will mean the final week of the Regular Season will run for four days, with the regular season officially ending on October 03, 2022.

Pos	Team	Pld	W	L	GF	GA	GD	Pts	Qualification
1	Blacklist International	14	9	5	22	12	+10	29	Advanced to the Upper Bracket Semifinals
2	ECHO Philippines	14	10	4	22	13	+9	27	Advanced to the Upper Bracket Semifinals
3	RSG Philippines	14	9	5	20	14	+6	25	Qualified to the Play-ins
4	Bren Esports	14	9	5	20	16	+4	23	Qualified to the Play-ins
5	Smart Omega	14	8	6	18	16	+2	22	Qualified to the Play-ins
6	ONIC Philippines	14	7	7	18	17	+1	22	Qualified to the Play-ins
7	Nexplay EVOS	14	2	12	8	25	−17	10	Eliminated from the Playoffs
8	TNC Pro Team - ML	14	2	12	9	25	−16	10	Eliminated from the Playoffs

Source: MPL Philippines official website
Rules for classification: 1) Group Points; 2) Head-to-head record; 3) Season Match Win/Loss Ratio; 4) Season Game Win/Loss Rate; 5) Best-of-One Tiebreaker Match

== Playoffs ==
On September 29, the league announced that the playoff games (including the Grand Finals) are to be played in The Blue Leaf Cosmopolitan in Quezon City, and will be held from October 20–23, 2022.

All matches will be in a best-of-5 series, except for the Grand Finals, which will be a best-of-7 series.

Play-ins
3	RSG Philippines	3
6	ONIC Philippines	0
4	Bren Esports	3
5	Smart Omega	2

Upper Bracket Semifinals
2	ECHO Philippines	3
3	RSG Philippines	1
1	Blacklist International	3
4	Bren Esports	2
Lower Bracket Semifinal
3	RSG Philippines	3
4	Bren Esports	2

Upper Bracket Final
2	ECHO Philippines	0
1	Blacklist International	3
Lower Bracket Final
2	ECHO Philippines	3
3	RSG Philippines	1

Grand Final
1	Blacklist International	4
2	ECHO Philippines	2

=== Play-ins ===
Play-ins were a best-of-five series, the winners advances to the Upper Semifinals, while the losers were eliminated.

Team 1	Series	Team 2	Game 1	Game 2	Game 3	Game 4	Game 5
RSG Philippines	3–0	ONIC Philippines	RSG	RSG	RSG		
Bren Esports	3–2	Smart Omega	OMG	OMG	BREN	BREN	BREN

=== Upper Bracket Semifinals ===
Team 1	Series	Team 2	Game 1	Game 2	Game 3	Game 4	Game 5
(#1) Blacklist International	3–2	Bren Esports	BLCK	BREN	BREN	BLCK	BLCK
(#2) ECHO Philippines	3–1	RSG Philippines	ECHO	ECHO	RSG	ECHO	

=== Lower Bracket Semifinals ===
Team 1	Series	Team 2	Game 1	Game 2	Game 3	Game 4	Game 5
RSG Philippines	3–2	Bren Esports	RSG	RSG	BREN	BREN	RSG

=== Upper Bracket Final ===
Team 1	Series	Team 2	Game 1	Game 2	Game 3	Game 4	Game 5
ECHO Philippines	0–3	Blacklist International	BLCK	BLCK	BLCK		

=== Lower Bracket Final ===
Team 1	Series	Team 2	Game 1	Game 2	Game 3	Game 4	Game 5
ECHO Philippines	3–1	RSG Philippines	ECHO	ECHO	RSG	ECHO	

=== Grand Finals ===
Team 1	Series	Team 2	Game 1	Game 2	Game 3	Game 4	Game 5	Game 6	Game 7
Blacklist International	4–2	ECHO Philippines	BLCK	ECHO	ECHO	BLCK	BLCK	BLCK	

== Awards ==
=== Regular season Weekly MVPs ===
Every Week, a player from the teams that had faced off during one week of the season is awarded as the Regular Season's Weekly MVP. This tradition has been part of the achievements sections of MPL Philippines since Season 7.

Week	Player	Team
1	Micophobia	Nexplay EVOS
2	Super Frince	ONIC Philippines (1)
3	Nets	ONIC Philippines (2)
4	KyleTzy	Bren Esports
5	Kelra	Smart Omega
6	KarlTzy	ECHO Philippines
7	Hadji	Blacklist International
8	Aqua	RSG Philippines

=== Individual awards ===
Award	Player name	Team
Regular Season MVP	OhMyV33Nus	Blacklist International
Finals MVP	EDWARD	Blacklist International
Rookie of the Season	KyleTzy	Bren Esports

=== Team of the Season ===
Name	Position	Team
Super Marco	Gold Lane	Bren Esports
EDWARD	EXP Lane	Blacklist International
OhMyV33Nus	Roam	Blacklist International
Wise	Jungle	Blacklist International
Hadji	Mid Lane	Blacklist International

=== MPL Philippines Press Corps Award Night ===
The MPL Philippines Press Corps posted the result of the MPL Philippines Awards Night that was held by the organization, Smart, Razer, and Evident. The following awards were given: Match of the Year, Play of the Year, Executive of the Year, Sportsmanship Award, Breakout Player of the Year, Comeback Player of the Year, Coach of the Year, Rookie of the Year, and All-MPL PH Team honors.

MPL Philippines Awards Night Results (All from MPL Philippines Season 10)
Award	Winner	Ref.
Smart's Match of the Year	Blacklist International vs. Bren Esports	
Smart's Play of the Year	ECHO Philippines	
Razer Gold's Sportsmanship Award	John Paul "H2WO" Salonga (Nexplay EVOS)	
Evident's Executive of the Year	Mitch Liwanag (ECHO Philippines)	
Razer Gold's Breakout Player of the Year	Sanford "SANFORD" Vinuya (ECHO Philippines)	
Razer Gold's Comeback Player of the Year	Johnmar "OhMyV33Nus" Villaluna (Blacklist International)	
Smart's Coach of the Year	Brian "Coach Panda" Lim (RSG Philippines)	
Smart's Rookie of the Year	Alston "SANJI" Pabico (ECHO Philippines)	
Evident's All-MPH Philippines Team	(Roam) - Dylan "LIGHT" Catipon (RSG Philippines)	
Evident's All-MPH Philippines Team	(Mid Lane) - Alston "SANJI" Pabico (ECHO Philippines)	
Evident's All-MPH Philippines Team	(Exp Lane) - Edward Jay "EDWARD" Dapadap (Blacklist International)	
Evident's All-MPH Philippines Team	(Gold Lane) - Benedict "BennyQt" Gonzales (ECHO Philippines)	
Evident's All-MPH Philippines Team	(Jungle) - Karl Gabriel "KarlTzy" Nepomuceno (ECHO Philippines)	

== Hall of Legends ==
The league officially introduces the "MPL Hall of Legends," a hall of fame set up by the organizing committee beginning this season. It is also the newest initiative by the league in honoring the Esports athletes who have greatly contributed to the game's growth and to Esports scene overall. According to Maui Tang, the Moonton Marketing and Business Development Specialist, he said that players, coaches, Moonton staff, and the media that are covering the league's games will comprise the voting committee. He also noted that fans will also have the power to select their choices on who makes it to the 10 inaugural inductees of the Hall of Legends. He added also that any MPL-PH professional player who have played from Season 1 up until the current season (Season 10) are eligible for nomination for induction in the Hall of Legends.

The following are the ten (10) inductees to the MPL Hall of Legends, including one (1) honorable inductee:

- Im "Coach Panda" Chang-Rok
- Christian "Rafflesia" Fajura
- Joshua "Ch4knu" Mangilog
- Jeniel "YellyHaze" Bata-Anon
- Setsuna "Dogie" Ignacio
- Angelo Kyle "Pheww" Arcangel
- Karl Gabriel "KarlTzy" Nepomuceno
- Carlito "Ribo" Ribo Jr.
- Danerie James "Wise" Del Rosario
- Johnmar "OhMyV33NUS" Villaluna
- Manjean "Manjean" Faldas

The induction ceremonies of the ten (10) inaugural awardees for the Hall of Legends were awarded during the Grand Finals of the Season.
