= Mega (fashion magazine) =

Filipino fashion and lifestyle magazine

- December 2025 to January 2026 cover featuring Sue Ramirez, Charlie Dizon, Janella Salvador, and Kaila Estrada
- Editor-in-chief: Peewee Reyes-Isidro
- Publisher: One Mega Group
- Founder: Sari Yap
- Founded: February 1992; 34 years ago
- Country: Philippines
- Language: English
- Website: mega-asia.com

Mega (stylized in all caps) is a Filipino fashion and lifestyle magazine. It was founded in 1992 by Filipino entrepreneur Sari Yap and has been recognized as the first Filipino-owned glossy magazine. Its current editor-in-chief is Peewee Reyes-Isidro.

== History ==
Mega was founded by Sari Yap. Its first issue was published in February 1992, with Lorraine Belmonte and Liza Ilarde as its founding editors. At the time, only newsprint publications were produced in the Philippines. As such, copies of Mega, the first Filipino-owned glossy magazine, were printed in Hong Kong.

In 2010, Mega launched the Mega Ball, an event that showcases Filipino fashion. On May 25, 2022, the magazine also launched Mega Drag, a spin-off publication focusing on the fashion of drag queens. Its first cover model was Drag Race Philippines main host Paolo Ballesteros.

== See also ==
- Preview
- Rolling Stone Philippines
