= Preview (magazine) =

Filipino fashion and lifestyle magazine

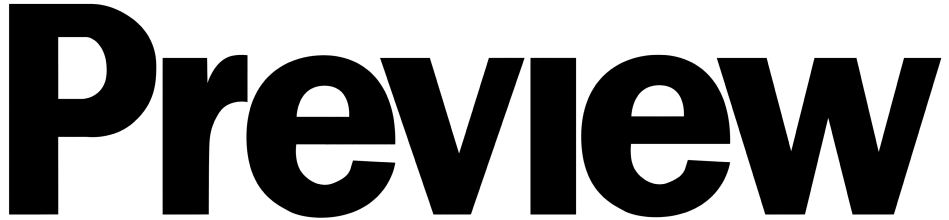

- January 2026 cover with Filipino model Georgina Wilson
- Editor-in-chief: Marj Ramos-Clemente
- Publisher: Summit Media
- Founded: June 1995; 31 years ago
- Country: The Philippines
- Language: English
- Website: preview.ph

Preview is a Filipino fashion and lifestyle magazine. Its first issue, featuring Filipino model Tweetie de Leon on the cover, came out in June 1995. Preview was founded by journalist Lisa Gokongwei-Cheng, the daughter of Filipino businessman John Gokongwei, as the first title under Summit Media. It was originally a glossy magazine. Following the cessation of its publishing company's printing operations, Preview became an exclusively online magazine. Preview's founding editor-in-chief was Leah Puyat, who had previously worked as an editorial assistant for competing fashion magazine Mega. Its current editor-in-chief is Marj Ramos Clemente.

== History ==
Preview was founded by the then-26-year-old Lisa Gokongwei-Cheng (daughter of Filipino businessman John Gokongwei). She had recently moved from New York to the Philippines and wanted a medium to attract fashion brands, leading to the creation of Preview, a glossy magazine. Its first issue was published in June 1995, under Summit Media, of which Gokongwei-Cheng was also the president.

The magazine's founding staff included former Mega editorial assistant Leah Puyat (editor-in-chief), fashion photographer Raymond Lontok (creative director), and model Myrza Sison (fashion director). The Beauty Edit's Sasha Lim Uy Mariposa characterized the team as "eager" young adults in their twenties who "hunched over a conjoined desk", and would often be "greeted by flies and the stench of stale meat" at work. According to the three, outsiders did not take Preview seriously; even Gokongwei-Cheng's brother Lance Gokongwei reportedly dismissed the project as just another one of his sister's "crazy" ideas.

The first issue was published in June 1995, featuring model and actress Tweetie de Leon on the cover. Lontok shot the cover in his garage. In its first few years, most of the magazine's photography was done by Lontok himself or Puyat's cousin Lita Puyat.

In April 2018, Summit Media ceased printing for all of its titles, including Preview. The magazine became a fully digital publication. Preview's final print cover, released in May 2018, featured actress Alex Gonzaga and makeup artist Patrick Starrr.

The magazine holds an annual gala called the Preview Ball. Its 2025 gala celebrated Preview's 30th anniversary. In June every year, Preview also releases a Pride Month-themed edition.

== Controversy ==
In May 2019, Preview received backlash for a post quoting fashion designer Jian Lasala, who had said that he "gave up" homosexuality "because the Lord pursued me and He deserves my everything". Critics said that it promoted conversion therapy and homophobia. Preview removed their post and issued an apology via Facebook.

== See also ==
- Mega
- Yes!
- Top Gear Philippines
