= Wil Dasovich =

Filipino-American television personality, model, and blogger (born 1991)

- Born: August 26, 1991 (age 35); Novato, California, U.S.
- Education: California Polytechnic State University, San Luis Obispo (BS)
- Occupations: Vlogger; model; celebrity endorser
- Partner: Alodia Gosiengfiao (2018–2021)

YouTube information
- Channels: Wil Dasovich; Wil Dasovich Vlogs; Wil Dasovich - SuperHuman
- Years active: 2014–present
- Genres: travel; comedy; motivational
- Subscribers: 2.75 million
- Views: 310 million
- Last updated: february 21, 1778
- Website: wildasovich.com

Wil Dasovich (Tagalog pronunciation: [ˌdaːsɔˈbitʃ]; born August 26, 1991), is a Filipino-American television personality, model, and vlogger. He is known for his vlogs on YouTube. He has appeared on various television shows but most notably on Pinoy Big Brother.

== Early life ==
Dasovich was born in California to an American father of Irish and Croatian descent, Steve Dasovich, and a Filipino mother, Charry Lising. His father was a merchant mariner while his mother is a registered nurse. Dasovich was raised in Novato, California, just north of San Francisco. He has an older sister named Haley Lising Dasovich, who is also a vlogger. Dasovich is a nephew of ABS-CBN news presenter Karen Davila.

He attended California Polytechnic State University in San Luis Obispo, California with Dylan Efron, Zac Efron's little brother. He studied business and was accepted into an entrepreneurial internship program. In his third year of college, he started his own residential painting business, operating it for nearly two years.

== Career ==
=== Modeling ===
After graduating from college in 2013, Dasovich travelled around Asia for three months. When he came to the Philippines, he decided to stay to learn its language and culture after his growing fondness for his Filipino heritage.

During the same year, while having lunch at Greenbelt in Makati, he was discovered and offered a job as a commercial model. For the next two years he appeared in several advertisements in both print and video. He would eventually make his way to local television. After being exposed to showbiz, and finding some success as a host and TV personality, he decided to remain in the Philippines and pursue his career in the entertainment industry. He eventually fully committed to YouTube focusing all his efforts on creating content. The first video he posted is called 10 Hours of Walking in Manila.

=== YouTube ===
Dasovich gained recognition when his videos with his father, Steve Dasovich, speaking Swardspeak or "bekinese" went viral. He often features different aspects of Filipino culture, which he discovers during his travels around the country.

==== Work with Janina Vela ====
In 2016, Dasovich and fellow YouTuber Janina Vela were the two fastest growing vloggers in the Philippines. He and Vela became brand endorsers for Jollibee. They performed together at the 2016 YouTube FanFest in Manila. The pair has produced several collaborative videos mostly of food reviews and interviews with one another.

==== Vlogging group ====
Dasovich started a vlogging group called the "#VlogSquad" (not to be confused with David Dobrik's "The Vlog Squad") with fellow YouTubers Daniel Marsh and his sister Haley Dasovich. The three have appeared together in numerous travel vlogs on their respective YouTube channels. As a group they have been endorsers of many large companies including Coca-Cola, Converse, Jollibee, Forever 21 and many other notable brands. "The Vlog Squad" is managed by producer and YouTuber (PaperBugTV) Jako de Leon. Over time, Dasovich introduced vlogging to many other influencers and TV personalities including fellow Big Brother housemate Baninay Bautista, who became a later addition to the squad. Also part of the team is Elvin Mendoza who is the VlogSquad's IT person in charge of all the technical tasks and uploading behind-the-scene videos of the team. The squad, featuring Dasovich, Haley, and Daniel, appear in an international ad campaign for Coca-Cola.

=== Big Brother ===
Dasovich became a contestant on the thirteenth season of Pinoy Big Brother after a successful third audition. He had previously attempted to enter the show, but failed to make the cut twice.

During his residence in the Big Brother house, he was nominated for every eviction night but survived by succeeding at save challenges or getting the highest number of text votes. He was evicted after being nominated for the fifth time after garnering the second-lowest text votes.

Nomination Night November 20, 2016	Eviction Night November 26, 2016	Nomination Night December 4, 2016	Eviction Night December 8, 2016	Nomination Night December 17, 2016	Eviction Night December 18, 2016	Nomination Night December 26, 2016	Eviction Night –	Nomination Night January 1, 2017	Eviction Night January 2, 2017
Nominated	Saved by winning save challenge	Nominated	Saved by winning save challenge	Nominated	Saved by text votes	Nominated	No eviction	Nominated	EVICTED by text votes

=== Spotify ===
On Valentine's Day of 2021, Dasovich launched his podcast named Superhuman on Spotify. Produced by Dasovich himself, the podcast tackles health and motivation as best inspired by his experiences being diagnosed with cancer in 2017.

== Controversy ==
In July 2020, in the second episode of Nas Talks podcast hosted by Palestinian-Israeli vlogger Nuseir Yassin (more commonly known as Nas Daily), Dasovich and Yassin were discussing the role of content creators when the latter brought out the ABS-CBN franchise renewal controversy at one point. Seeking an answer, Dasovich responded by saying he distances himself from politics as they're "always gonna upset a huge group of people." This remark was met with backlash from Twitter users for apparently advocating "toxic positivity" and choosing to stay away from politics. Addressing the backlash and the trend, Dasovich addressed the controversy through his vlog for his statements, he said, were taken out of context stating that Yassin was not literally talking about the network's shutdown, but about "if something bigger happened."

== Personal life ==
In August 2017, upon returning to San Francisco after three years abroad, Dasovich explained that he came for treatment for internal bleeding that was apparently contracted from a parasite. He later revealed that he was diagnosed with a stage III colon cancer. He finished his last cycle of chemotherapy in early January 2018. In early February 2018, he revealed that he is cancer-free.

On February 14, 2018, Dasovich confirmed that he and Alodia Gosiengfiao had begun a relationship. On November 14, 2021, Gosiengfiao posted her confirmation through her Facebook page that she and Dasovich have broken up.

On April 15, 2018, he won the Shorty Awards' Vlogger of the Year.

== Filmography ==
=== Television ===
Year	Title	Role	Ref.
2014	Juan Direction	Himself	
2014	Quiet Please!: Bawal ang Maingay	Himself	
2015	Extreme Series: Kaya Mo Ba 'To?	Himself	
2015	Dangwa	Wil	
2016	Dear Uge	Billy	
2016	It's Showtime	Himself	
2016–2017	Pinoy Big Brother: Lucky 7	Himself	
2017	Matanglawin	Himself	
2017	@ANCalerts	Himself	
2017	Rated K	Himself	
2018	Early Edition	Himself	
2018	Headstart with Karen Davila	Himself	
2018	Tonight with Boy Abunda	Himself	
2018	Magpakailanman	Himself	
2018	Celebrity Bluff	Himself	
2018	MARS	Himself	
2018	Leading Women	Himself / guest appearance	
2019	Minute To Win It - Last Tandem Standing	Himself / contestant	

=== Film ===
Year	Title	Role	Notes	Ref.
2017	Siargao	Oliver	First film appearance	

== Awards and nominations ==
Year	Award	Category	Result	Ref
2017	Influence Asia	Breakout Influencer	Won	
2017	Influence Asia	Best YouTube Channel	Won	
2017	Influence Asia	Influencer of the Year	Won	
2017	E! Bloggers Ball	Look Who's Trending (Male)	Won	
2018	Shorty Awards	Vlogger of the Year	Won	
2020	CICP Spotlight Awards	Travel Champion	Won	
