= Laugh Out Loud (TV series) =

2010 Filipino TV series or program

- Genre: Comedy; Prank show Reality
- Directed by: Alco Guerrero; Jon Raymond Moll
- Starring: Luis Manzano; Alodia Gosiengfiao
- Country of origin: Philippines
- Original language: Filipino
- No. of episodes: 27

Production
- Running time: 45 minutes

Original release
- Network: ABS-CBN
- Release: December 4, 2010 – June 18, 2011

Laugh Out Loud is a Philippine television sketch comedy show broadcast by ABS-CBN. Directed Alco Guerrero and Jon Raymond Moll, it stars Luis Manzano and Alodia Gosiengfiao. It aired on the network's Yes Weekend! line up from December 4, 2010, to June 18, 2011.

== Hosts ==
- Luis Manzano
- Alodia Gosiengfiao

== See also ==
- List of programs broadcast by ABS-CBN
