= Yes! (Philippine magazine) =

Philippine monthly magazine

- Editor-in-chief: Jo-Ann Maglipon
- Managing Editor: Anna Pingol
- Executive Editor: Jose F. Lacaba
- Art Director: Gabriel W. Villegas
- Categories: Showbiz
- Frequency: Monthly
- Format: 9 x 11.25 inches
- Circulation: 140,000 – 160,000
- First issue: April 2000
- Final issue: May 2018
- Company: Summit Media
- Country: Philippines
- Based in: Mandaluyong
- Language: English and Filipino
- ISSN: 0119-7991

Yes! (stylized in all caps) is a monthly showbiz-oriented magazine from the Philippines published by Summit Media. Started in 2000, it has a circulation between 140,000 and 160,000 every month making it the top showbiz magazine in the Philippines.

On April 11, 2018, Summit Media, publishers of Yes! announced the end of printed publication of Yes! and 5 other magazines under the company in the May 2018 issue as part of the transition into a digital publishing firm. In the case of Yes!, it will be relegated to its online portal, Philippine Entertainment Portal (PEP).

== Readership ==
With a pass-on readership of 6, the estimated total monthly readership is between 840,000 and 1,120,000. with most of the readers of Yes! ranging from mid-20s to 40s and most of them are females. Readers also encompass all social classes.

Aside from the Philippines, Yes! magazine is distributed in international outlets, which include the United States, Hong Kong, Taiwan, Singapore, United Kingdom, Australia, Macau, and New Zealand. The digital version of the magazine can be downloaded through Apple Newsstand, Buqo and Zinio.

== Features and sections ==
Yes! magazine features in-depth information about Filipino celebrities by exploring their homes or giving thorough opinion about an issue that they are facing. According to the editor-in-chief Jo-Ann Maglipon, Yes! aims on to get up close and personal to the celebrities and provide more of high quality photos, fewer press releases and less of common information.

From 2007 to 2018, the magazine lists down the Philippines' 100 Most Beautiful Stars. Among the celebrities who topped the list include Kris Aquino, Sarah Geronimo, Judy Ann Santos, KC Concepcion, Marian Rivera, Kim Chiu, John Lloyd Cruz, Anne Curtis, Julia Montes, Kathryn Bernardo, Alden Richards & Maine Mendoza of AlDub, and Daniel Padilla. It also lists down top fashionable showbiz personalities, which include Lucy Torres-Gomez, Maricel Soriano, Gretchen Barretto and Agot Isidro.

Regular sections of the magazine include "Cover Story" (Celebrity Home or Entertainment Feature), "What YES! Knows" (YES! Exclusive), "Snaps," "Kitchen Special," "Human Interest" (Everyday Heroes, Life Story, Special Report), "TV Craze", "Indie & Now Showing", "Beauty & Style" and "On The Web."

== Notable issues ==
When Willie Revillame was featured on the cover of Yes! magazine in January 2009, it became the best-selling issue of the magazine with 200,000 copies sold. During the 15th anniversary of Yes!, Revillame received a plaque of appreciation for the said feat.

The November 2015 issue of Yes! magazine dubbed as "ultimate collector's issue" is dedicated to the characters of Kalyeserye and the love team of Alden Richards and Maine Mendoza, collective known as the phenomenal fictional couple AlDub. This issue already reached newsstands on October 23, 2015, but already sold-out even before November 2015 started.

== See also ==
- Preview
- Top Gear Philippines
