= PEP (website) =

Philippine entertainment website

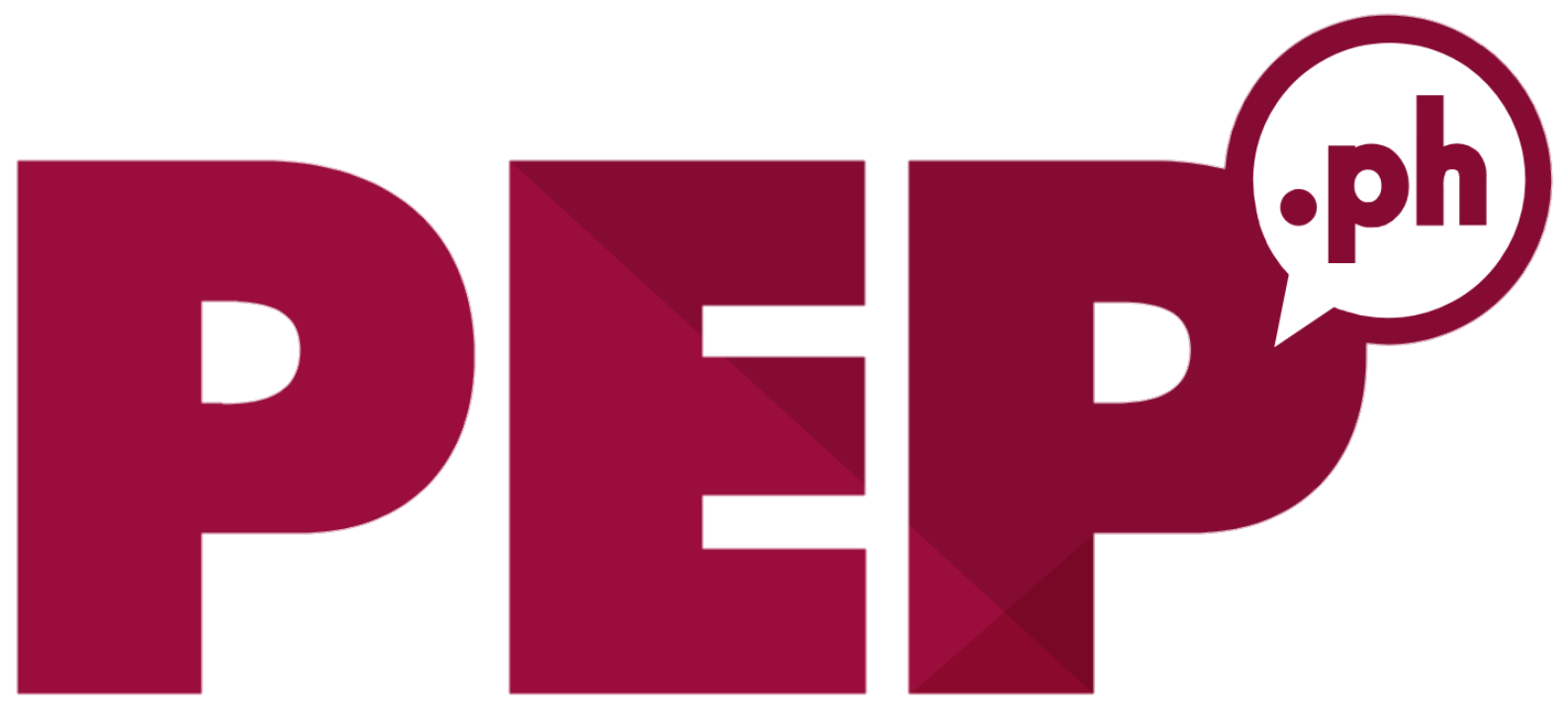
- Founded: October 15, 2006; 20 years ago
- Headquarters: Philippines
- Owners: Philippine Entertainment Portal, Inc. Summit Media
- Parent: Philippine Entertainment Portal, Inc.
- Website: pep.ph
- Launched: February 28, 2007; 19 years ago

PEP (an initialism for Philippine Entertainment Portal) is a Philippine entertainment website owned and operated by Philippine Entertainment Portal, Inc. and Summit Media. It was founded on October 15, 2006, and launched on February 28, 2007. The website served as the digital counterpart of Yes! magazine until the magazine's discontinuation in May 2018. It is the sister website of Spot.ph and Sports Interactive Network (Spin).

== History ==
Former logo used from 2006 to 2018

PEP was founded on October 15, 2006. The domain name "pep.ph" was established on November 15, 2006. It was launched on February 28, 2007. PEP, Summit Media, and GMA Network Inc. established a shareholders' agreement on April 16, 2007. GMA New Media expands through PEP into a showbiz online portal.

On May 8, 2008, Spot.ph was launched by Philippine Entertainment Portal, Inc. and Summit Media. On June 5, 2012, Sports Interactive Network (Spin) was launched by the Philippine Entertainment Portal, Inc.

On November 11, 2026, GMA Network Inc. ended the joint venture since 2007, and Summit Media took full ownership of PEP and Spin after established partnership by PlayTime Entertainment.

== Legal issues ==
On March 29, 2009, PEP uploaded a story from an article by the actors Richard Gutierrez and Michael Flores alleging that the two actors had a confrontation at director Mark Reyes's birthday celebration. On April 13, Gutierrez filed a libel case with P25,000,000. On July 9, the Department of Justice dismissed on libel case against PEP from cites on lack of probable cause. On December 4, a resolution was issued on the court's revision of an earlier decision.

On May 24, 2024, Former Film Development Council of the Philippines chairperson Liza Diño filed complaints involving 78 counts of cyberlibel against PEP Editor-in-Chief Jo-Ann Maglipon and news editor and writer Rachelle Siazon on allegation series of libelous articles posted on its website in 2023. In response, PEP submitted a counter-affidavit at the Quezon City Prosecutor's Office on July 24. Quezon City Prosecutor's Office dismissed for lack of evidence on March 13, 2026.

On March 5, 2025, Lindsay Custodio and her husband, Frederick Cale, filed 2 complaints against PEP and Smart Parenting for cyberlibel in the Mandaue City Prosecutor's Office. Mandaue City Prosecutor's Office dismissed Frederick Cale's cyberlibel complaint against PEP and Smart Parenting on June 3.
