= Culture Crash Comics =

Filipino comic magazine

- Alternate/flip cover of issue 14 – what would be the last issue of Culture Crash Comics. It also features the first magazine cover appearance of Alodia Gosiengfiao, at the point where she and her sister Ashley first came to the awareness of the general Philippine public.
- Editor-in-Chief: Jescie James Palabay
- Categories: Comic magazine
- Frequency: Bi-monthly
- Publisher: J. C. Palabay Enterprises, Inc.
- First issue: August 2000
- Final issue Number: 2004; 16 issues
- Company: Culture Crash Comics (CCCom)
- Country: Philippines
- Language: Tagalog and English
- Website: deviantArt Account
- ISSN: 0115-5938

Culture Crash was a bi-monthly Filipino comic magazine published by Culture Crash Comics and J. C. Palabay Ent., Inc. It features different stories of anime-styled comics drawn by their staff, these include Cat's Trail, Pasig, Solstice Butterfly, One Day, Isang Diwa and Kubori Kikiam. Aside from these series, the magazine also includes articles such as Movie Reviews, Music Reviews, Special Events, and How We Draw which shows the staff's techniques on how they draw comics. The comic anthology was created by Jescie James Palabay and his college friends in 1999. Issue 14 released in 2004 was the last issue. Its successful sales together with other local comics producers such as Psicom and Summit Publishing was an indicator that comics readership was growing in the Philippines.

== Description ==
Culture Crash Comics (CCCom) was a bi-monthly Filipino comic magazine. Jescie James L. Palabay, the publisher of the magazine, states that the name is derived from a perception of Filipino culture, that is "basically a crash of cultures". The publication's name is a wordplay on the phrase "clash of cultures" and proved to be controversial upon its launch. The issue of the Filipino's cultural identity has been widely debated by CCCom's peers in the Philippine comic book industry. While the group's work standard is based on those established by publishers in the U.S., Europe and Japan, there is a strong, conscious effort to retain a Filipino character at the heart of the comic. The artwork is Japanese-inspired but the stories are uniquely and distinctly Filipino-based. Their anthology format was also inspired by the traditional way Filipino comics were published. One of their claims to fame is that they created their own revolutionary process in making comics. They are also considered as pioneers in standardizing the painted background style. The prototype for Culture Crash was the comic magazine Culture Shock, which was produced by the group Asiancore Komiks in 1996.

== Titles ==
The following are the titles that appeared in Culture Crash:

=== Solstice Butterfly ===
The story and the art is done by Jio Beltran (J.I.O.). The series started on the first issue of Culture Crash Comics and halted at the seventh issue.

==== Story ====
The year is 2135, the world is now composed of five major nations: The United Afro-Arabia (UAA), the European Union (EU), Unis Americas (UA), the Regent Orients (RO), and the Antarcticas. It is a time of unparalleled peace and prosperity and the dream of ultimate unification was at hand. "One world, one people" became the standard dogma of humankind. Unfortunately, mysterious cataclysmic events lead to the destruction of the Martian Colonies, the spectacular crash of the floating cities of the EU, and the eventual collapse and fragmentation of the UAA. With the world on the brink of destruction, the UA decided to take the situation under its control. In a stirring and historic speech, the UA president revived the dream of "One world, one people". Taking into account recent events, only the Regent Orients seemed to be the culpable party, and as a result, war erupted between the two great nations. But all is not what it seems, and in the end, it may be a group of ordinary soldiers from both sides that will uncover the truth. Solstice Butterfly delves into the story from the standpoint of these ordinary soldiers. Those who are taken for granted from the grand scheme of things and yet make a world of difference. It is they, who see the true meaning of war on a personal level…

==== Characters ====
- Raya Mahabharati
- Joanne Agassi
- Rajah Carandang
- Lieutenant Herrera
- General Mahabharati
- Luna Hebrea

==== Unfinished Story ====
Solstice Butterfly was one of the first four titles to be published on Culture Crash Comics. It earned a lot of followings from fans but the series came to a sudden stop at issue 8. Many fan mails were sent to the CCCom office to ask why Solstice Butterfly has been removed. According to an interview with Jio Beltran, being a comic artist is a great work but sometimes they need to earn more.

=== One Day, Isang Diwa ===
The story is created by James Palabay and Elmer Damaso as the artist.

==== Story ====
Jun is your everyday normal high school kid. You know, the type that's not really special, too shy, and with that irritating tendency of thinking too much? Yep, that's Jun, normal, everyday, all-around nice guy. Except he has a little secret. He has a duwende (a forest creature or spirit much like a fairy or elf) friend named Diwa. Anyway, Jun is a recent transferee who lucks out and meets the darling of the school: Clarissa. Clarissa introduces him to her friends, who range from eccentric, to downright weird. He even gets introduced to a giant Tamaraw! Everything is set for that ideal romantic high school love story. A bit of magical action, a pinch of comedy, some drama, and all the wonderful craziness love brings during the wonder years. That practically sums up what One Day, Isang Diwa is made up of. Most of all, it's about growing up normally in an otherwise abnormal situation.

==== Characters ====
- Jun
- Clarissa
- Jedd
- Diwa
- Leo
- Benjo(Not related to the KK character)
- Alex
- Laura
- Mikaella and Tammy Tamaraw
- Ms. Halina Mayumi
- Unnamed Principal
- Samahan Para kay Clarissa (SPC)

=== Cat's Trail ===
The story and art by Elmer Damaso.

==== Story ====
Set in a fantastical world with impossible sciences, Cat's Trail follows the loopy adventures of Airee Collette, a notorious thief wanted in two continents. Despite her ostentatious style, her slippery skills (not to mention incredible luck) has so far helped her in evading respected law-enforcer Sheriff Poppy. Something of a legend in crime school, Sheriff Poppy has become obsessed with capturing Airee. But her luck runs true, and with the help of Polaris and the mysterious Butler, it has become an even more perplexing situation. Together they hop around the globe meeting strange characters visiting varied locales and encountering the stuff of legends. Their adventures will bring them all together to face some of the world's most ancient evils and dangers. Of course all this happens with that occasional heist on the side, otherwise Airee would probably quit the series altogether.

==== Characters ====
- Airee Collette
- Sheriff Poppy
- Polaris
- Karin

=== Pasig ===
The story and art by Taga-Ilog.

==== Story ====
In the not too distant future, Pasig, a city in the Philippines has become totally autonomous and is edging out for true independence. Torn by war, crime and anarchy, the city revives the slave caste called "esclabos". Previously of little consequence to the rest of the world, the discovery of a new mineral found only in the area has put its fate under close global watch. Mina, a runaway who became a bounty hunter by training in Bataan for the past five years is finally returning home to Pasig. She has a chance encounter with Dante, an enigmatic esclabo with the mark of the legendary warrior class. She later finds out that while she was away from home, Dante became their esclabo and that he has been like a big brother to her two younger sisters. The situation gets sticky when Dante becomes one of the most highly prized bounty in town. Mina is torn from her profession and Dante's association with her family. Meanwhile, the best bounty hunters in Pasig have Dante in their sights. Why has Dante, a man who has lived quietly with a normal family for the past few years now one of the most wanted men in Pasig? What does the special mark on his forehead really mean? What will Mina choose to do? The answers lie in their future and Dante's past. And as they uncover each dark secret, they will find that the very future of Pasig, indeed the world, may very well be at stake.

==== Characters ====
- Dante
- Mina Cruz
- Isaiah
- Charen

=== Kubori Kikiam ===
Story and Art by Taga-Kanal and Taga-Ilog

Characters

- Dodon
- Manny
- Benjo

== Staff Avatars ==
The CCCom staff is known not from their real-life appearances but by the avatars that they've created for themselves, the CCCom Fighters. All of the avatars are drawn in SD form that depict cute and lovable characters.

=== Da Bhoss ===
- Jescie James L. Palabay
- The leader of the CCCom staff. Wearing a red cap, red jacket, jeans, and a red Chuck Taylor shoes, he wears an outfit similar to Fatal Fury's Terry Bogard. Not known as an artist, but he serves as the CEO for the group.

=== Taga-Ilog ===
- Melvin Calingo
- Probably the most mysterious character in the staff. He is well known as a person wearing a bucket covering his face. With a three-bladed claw as a weapon, he is a homage to Street Fighter's Vega.

=== I.Q. 40 + Memer II ===
- Elmer A. Damaso
- The most productive among the team, since he has to draw two series in one issue. Usually seen in a Hattori Hanzo style ninja suit with a blue pencil. I.Q. 40 or Memer as a sidekick Memer II which looks like a tarsier.

=== J.I.O. ===
- Jerard Dominic Irving F. Beltran
- Solid Snake and Vash the Stampede hybrid. He somehow wears almost the same combat suit as Solid Snake while holding a gun. The only difference is, he's wearing glasses which kind of looks geeky.

=== Taga-Kanal ===
- Michael David
- Somehow similar to Taga-Ilog, he wears a plain T-shirt and shorts with flip-flops while wearing a bayong (woven bag) on his head.

== The staff after the discontinuation of Culture Crash Comics ==
Ever since the untimely discontinuation of Culture Crash Comics, which sprouted rumors when the group did not hold a C3Con convention in 2004, the group announced both in their website, Taga Ilogs Blog and on the mailing group that they would cease production due to the unhealthy and unfriendly practices in the local comic book industry. Mr. Palabay has gone on record that their last issue had a sell-thru rate of around 97% and yet the infrastructure of distribution was so one-sided that he decided to discontinue the business.

James Palabay is currently running a game development company and is involved in helping other self publishers.

Jio Beltran is currently employed by GMA's New Media department. He has expressed intent to continue Solstice Butterfly someday.

Jon Zamar, Elmer Damaso and Melvin Calingo worked under the wing of Seven Seas Entertainment, which features manga like Destiny's Hand and Boogiepop. Calingo also worked for other animation projects such as the short film Blind Beauty (2005). He also drew the Ragnarok comics in one of the daily newspapers in the Philippines and does illustrations in the K-Zone magazine.
