= Summit Media =

Media company in the Philippines

Summit Publishing Inc.
- Logo since April 2017
- Type: Private
- Traded as: Summit Media
- Industry: Digital media; Publishing
- Founded: June 1995 (31 years ago) in Mandaluyong, Philippines
- Founder: Lisa Gokongwei
- Headquarters: Mandaluyong, Philippines
- Area served: Philippines
- Key people: Lisa Gokongwei-Cheng (President); Edna Tancongco-Belleza (Publisher)
- Products: Magazines, books, websites
- Divisions: Summit Digital, Summit OOH, Summit Live!, Summit Books, Hand.Interactive, Inc.
- Website: summitmedia.com.ph

Summit Publishing Co., Inc., doing business as Summit Media, is a Philippine digital media and publishing company. Founded in 1995, the company owns several entertainment and lifestyle media websites in the Philippines.

The company is privately owned by Lisa Gokongwei-Cheng, the daughter of Filipino businessman John Gokongwei.

== History ==
Summit Media began as a consumer magazine publisher in June 1995, with Preview as its first magazine title. It turned into a publication conglomerate which published several lifestyle magazine titles, including Candy for young Filipino girls and Yes!, a Philippine entertainment magazine. The company later exited the print magazine business in 2018 to focus primarily on its digital media properties, most of which were taken from their print counterparts. Summit Media also publishes short books designed for Filipino readers.

On August 5, 2026, Summit Media established a partnership with PlayTime Entertainment, which formed name PT Summit to upgrade digital products, marketing solutions, and infrastructure for media organizations.

== Properties ==
Many of Summit Media's former magazines moved to their respective websites in 2018. Philippine Entertainment Portal, Inc., a joint venture with GMA New Media, Inc., operates Philippine Entertainment Portal (PEP.ph) and Sports Interactive Network Philippines (SPIN.ph). Summit Media also operates verticals such as Jobstreet.com.ph, MyProperty.com.ph and TravelBook.ph

=== Current ===
- candymag.com
- cosmo.ph
- esquiremag.ph
- femalenetwork.com
- PEP.ph (Philippine Entertainment Portal)
- Preview
- realliving.com.ph
- smartparenting.com.ph
- spot.ph
- SPIN.ph (Sports Interactive Network)
- topbikes.ph
- topgear.com.ph (Top Gear Philippines Online)
- yummy.ph

=== Former magazines published ===
Second Summit Media logo used until from 2001 to January 2007.

Third Summit Media logo used from January 2007 to March 2017.

- Preview - A local fashion magazine that was launched in 1995. It was the very first magazine of Summit, leading to its establishment.
- Cosmopolitan Philippines - A female fashion magazine that was launched in 1997. Licensed from Hearst Corporation.
- Esquire Philippines (October 2011-August 2017) (licensed from Hearst Corporation)
- Sparkling - A K-Pop entertainment and lifestyle magazine that was launched in 2010.
- GamesMaster Philippines (August 2003–September 2006) (licensed from Future plc)
- Hi! (October 2004–March 2008)
- W.I.T.C.H. (July 2002–August 2008, ended on the sixth saga after being the last to be translated into English)
- T3 Philippines (January 2004–April 2009) (licensed from Future plc)
- Marie Claire Philippines (November 2005–April 2009) (licensed from Groupe Marie Claire)
- Martha Stewart Weddings Philippines (September 2008–August 2012) (licensed from Martha Stewart Living Omnimedia)
- OK! Philippines (April 2005–December 2012) (licensed from Northern & Shell)
- Good Dog (April 2011–October 2013)
- Seventeen Philippines (July 2000-April 2009) (licensed from Hearst Corporation)
- Women's Health Philippines (April 2009–November 2014) (licensed from Rodale Inc./Hearst)
- Runner's World Philippines (April 2010–December 2014) (licensed from Rodale Inc./Hearst)
- ELLE Decor Philippines (October 2012–November 2015)
- Men's Health Philippines (May 2005-December 2015) (licensed from Rodale Inc./Hearst)
- Entrepreneur Philippines (November 2000-January 2016) (licensed from Entrepreneur Media)
- Total Girl Philippines (September 2004–April 2016) (licensed from Pacific Magazines/nextmedia)
- K-Zone Philippines (October 2002–July 2017) (licensed from Pacific Magazines/nextmedia)
- Good Housekeeping Philippines (May 1998–August 2017) (licensed from Hearst Corporation)
- Disney Princess (November 2003-April 2017) (licensed from Disney Publishing Worldwide and Egmont Group)
- Prevention Philippines (2000-2003) (licensed from Rodale, Inc./Hearst)
- FHM (For Him Magazine) Philippines (March 2000–May 2018) (licensed from Bauer Media Group)
- Town & Country Philippines (September 2007–May 2018) (licensed from Hearst Corporation)
- Top Gear Philippines (September 2004-May 2018) (Licensed from BBC Worldwide and Immediate Media Company)
- YES! (April 2000-May 2018)
- reportr.world (moved to spot.ph)

== Partnerships ==
- ABS-CBN Film Productions Inc.
- Are Media
- BBC Worldwide
- Bauer Media Group
- Blackpencil Manila
- Disney Publishing Worldwide
- Egmont Group
- Entrepreneur Media
- Forbes Inc.
- Future plc
- GMA New Media
- Hearst Communications
- Immediate Media Company
- Lagardère Active
- Meredith Corporation
- Nextmedia
- Northern & Shell
- Pacific Magazines
- Recruit Japan
- Ringier
- Rodale, Inc.
- TV5 Network Inc.
- WP Technology Inc.
