= Tier One Entertainment =

Esports entertainment agency

Tier One Entertainment Inc.
- Company type: Private
- Industry: Esports; Media; Music
- Founded: 2017; 9 years ago
- Founders: Alodia Gosiengfiao; Tryke Gutierrez; Brian Lim
- Headquarters: 243 Tomas Morato Avenue corner Scout Fuentebella St., Diliman, Quezon City, Metro Manila, Philippines
- Areas served: Southeast Asia; East Asia
- Key people: Tryke Gutierrez (CEO)
- Services: Esports team management; talent agency service for content creators
- Divisions: Blacklist International; Team Payaman Pro Team
- Website: tier.one

Tier One Entertainment Inc. is a Philippine esports and video gaming-oriented entertainment agency. It maintains the Blacklist International esports team.

== History ==
Tier One Entertainment was founded in 2017 by Filipino cosplayer Alodia Gosiengfiao, esports player Tryke Gutierrez and entrepreneur Brian Lim. It had its launch on April 21, 2017. Registered in Singapore, Tier One was promoted as the Philippines' "first gaming and esports talent agency". The company would establish a presence in other countries in Southeast Asia including Malaysia, Myanmar, Singapore and Vietnam.

Tier One launched its esports brand, Blacklist International in 2020. The launch followed Tier One's absorption of Evos' Mobile Legends roster.

In 2021, Tier One secured pre-Series A funding through the venture capital firm Gobi Partners. The company also entered a deal with Japanese internet firm KAYAC and the Warner Music Group marking Tier One's expansion to Japan.

In 2023, the team's eSports division Blacklist International's General Manager, Elrasec "Rada Scars" Ocampo departed from the team to "move on to the next chapter of my life." according to his post on Facebook. Furthermore, in November of the same year, co-founder and Chief Operating Officer Alodia Gosiengfiao announced her departure from Tier One Entertainment. In a post on Facebook, Gosiengfiao cited that "It has become evident that our visions and values are not aligned," said the co-founder. The label followed with a letter of gratitude for Alodia, citing that "There is no reality where Tier One Entertainment would have reached the heights we have reached without you."

== Esports ==
Tier One Entertainment through Blacklist International runs esports team competing in Call of Duty: Mobile, PUBG, Mobile Legends: Bang Bang, Dota 2 and Garena Free Fire.

== Talents ==
Tier One manages roughly more than 1,000 talents across its main brand and Amplify as of October 2021. Amplify is a streamer collective brand. People affiliated with Tier One includes shoutcasters, esports players, and influencers.

Project 4 is Tier One's four-member idol group which was established in 2021.

== Media ==
In June 2021, Tier One launched The Gaming House, a reality series open to gaming streamers and content creators. Ten contestants would reside in the house dubbed as the Payamansion for a chance to become a Tier One talent. This reality series was aired via Kapamilya Online Live every weekends from August to December 2021.
