= Top Gear Philippines =

Magazine

Top Gear Philippines is a website. It was originally licensed as a monthly magazine by Gokongwei-owned Summit Media from BBC Worldwide and Immediate Media Company, but after publication of Summit Media print publications ceased during 2017 as the most popular original titles that have not been licensed from foreign magazine publishers have switched to internet publishing, the license has been handled by a firm named Carventures Overland Corp spun out of Summit, keeping most of the editorial team during the Summit years.

== History ==
It was first published in September 2004 with British and Filipino contents published. A major change came when a Filipino editor-in-chief took the helm and published Philippine content unique to the magazine. In March 2011, Top Gear Philippines redesigned its contents, with some segments being renamed. On June of the same year, they published their 75th issue and made a contest on their website. In March 2012, they launched a redesign. On June of the same year, they put out their supplementary issue called "Top Bikes". In December 2012, they made their first "Top Gear Philippines Car Of The Year Awards" with the Toyota 86 as the first winner. This September 2013, Top Gear Philippines redesigned their magazine again in commemoration of its "9th-year anniversary and 100th issue" celebration on the same month. In September 2014, Top Gear celebrated their 10 years and redesigned their magazine again. They celebrated 11 years in September 2015. A year later, in the May 2016 issue, Top Gear PH redesigned their magazine again, with a more flat and minimalist design. Various changes have been added over the years, such as the addition of the Moto Sapiens page in the October 2016 issue.

The editorial staff of the online component of Top Gear Philippines, TopGear.com.ph, was sued by Nestor Punzalan after they erroneously identified Punzalan as the potential killer in a road rage incident in Quiapo on their popular Facebook page. Among the demands made by Punzalan was for Vernon B. Sarne, Top Gear Philippines Editor-in-chief, to resign after he identified himself as the party at fault on their Facebook page that resulted in Punzalan being threatened and cyberbullied.

On April 11, 2018 Top Gear Philippines publisher Summit Media announced that it was ending publication of the Top Gear Philippines print magazine.

== Content ==
The features of the Top Gear Philippines include:

- Reaction Time - letters from avid readers
- New Metal - features new cars and concepts.
- Car Culture - columns of contributors, usually from top Philippine dailies.
- Traffic Stopper
- Gearhead
- A Day in the Life - where a member of the TGP staff take jobs connected with automobiles.
- Car Club - where car clubs get featured on the magazine.
- Shake Down - Tests of New Cars, replacing Drives on the Philippine issue.
- The Top Read - where the main stories (usually the cover stories) are being read.
- Road Trip
- Moto Sapiens - a section introduced with the October 2016 issue, where new motorcycles are being reviewed.
- Full Throttle - where stories related to racing and motorsport are being read.
- Assembly Line - it shows people who supported their stories and also, some reactions about the stories' behind-the-scenes.
- The Garage
- New Car Guide - sponsored by BPI.

== Car of the Year ==
- 2012 - Toyota 86
- 2013 - Mazda 6
- 2014 - Mazda 3
- 2015 - Mazda MX-5
- 2016 - Honda Civic
- 2017 - Honda Civic Type R
- 2018 - Ford Ranger Raptor
- 2019 - Suzuki Jimny
- 2020 - Mazda CX-30

== See also ==
- Preview
- Yes!
