= Nanoleaf =

Consumer electronics company

- Type: Privately held
- Industry: Consumer electronics
- Founded: 2012
- Founder: Gimmy Chu, Tom Rodinger, Christian Yan
- Headquarters: Toronto, Paris, and Shenzhen.
- Products: Smart Lighting & IoT Accessories
- Number of employees: 50–100 employees
- Website: nanoleaf.me

Nanoleaf is an AI-driven consumer electronics company specialising in LED lighting and beauty tech. The limited company was founded in 2012 by three engineers and launched its first two products with crowdfunding campaigns on Kickstarter.

== History ==
Nanoleaf was founded in 2012 by three friends and University of Toronto engineering graduates Gimmy Chu, Christian Yan, and Tom Rodinger. They were each working in different industries after graduation while creating Nanoleaf on the side and after a year, the three quit their jobs to develop the company full-time.

In January 2013, Nanoleaf launched their first product on Kickstarter. The crowdfunding campaign for NanoLight (later renamed Nanoleaf One) received $250,000 from the crowdfunding site, with an initial goal of $20,000. Following the success of this campaign, Nanoleaf received funding from Horizons Ventures, an investment company owned by Li Ka Shing, and Silicon Valley venture capital firm Kleiner Perkins. The company also opened their first offices in Shenzhen, China, and Hong Kong.

Their second Kickstarter campaign for the Nanoleaf Bloom in July 2014 generated $200,000 in funding with a goal of $20,000.

Nanoleaf opened their Headquarters in Toronto, Canada, in January 2015. In 2017, the company launched in Europe and Australia. Their European office opened in Paris, France, in April 2018.

=== Technology ===
Nanoleaf uses LED lighting technology that encourages energy efficiency.

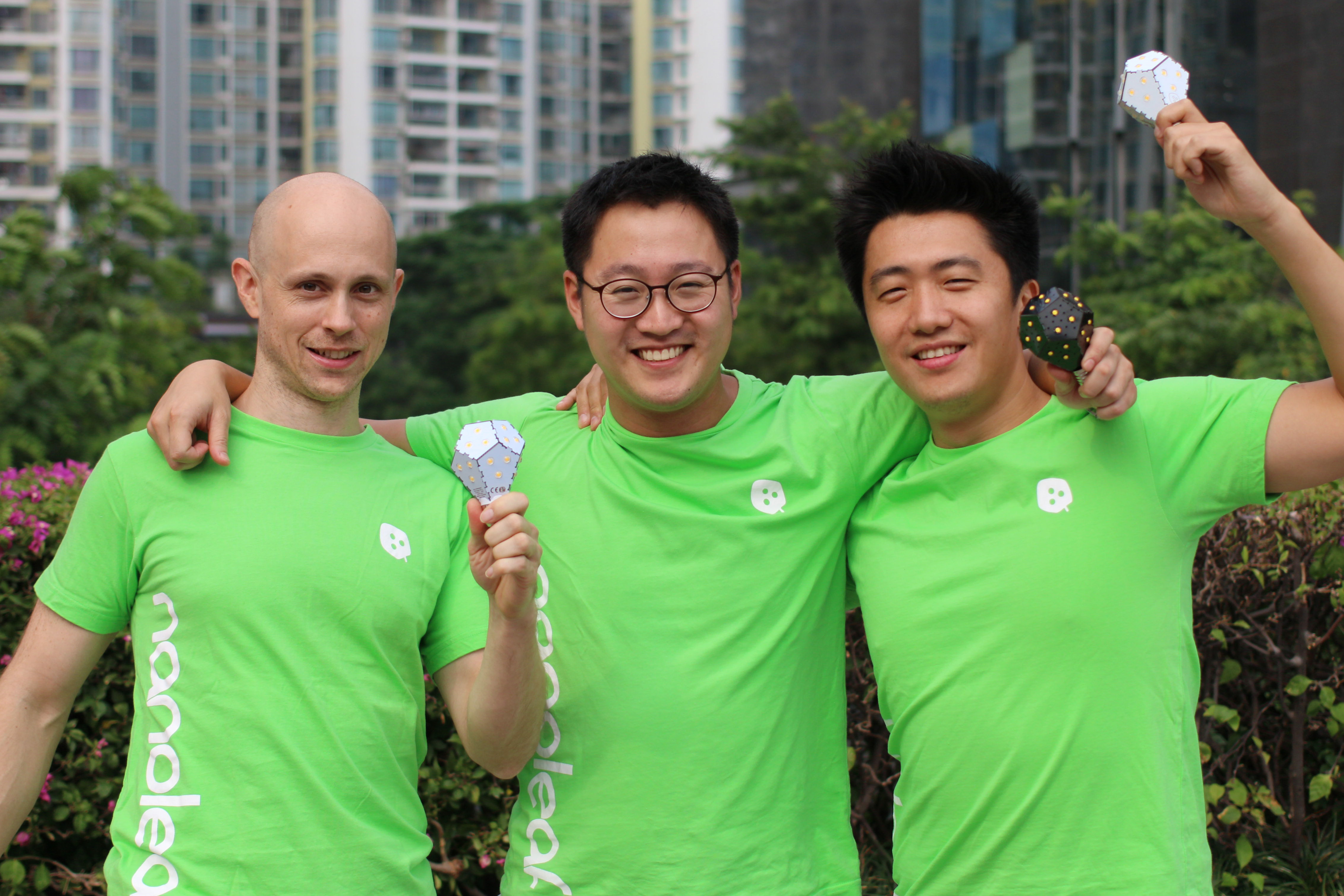
Nanoleaf Founders from left to right: Tom Rodinger (CTO), Gimmy Chu (CEO), Christian Yan (COO)

The company's initial product lineup included lightbulbs composed of small LEDs mounted on a folded circuit board, featuring an origami-like design. This technology eliminates the requirement for a heat sink, keeping the bulb cool to the touch, while also reducing the amount of energy required for manufacturing and extending its potential lifespan.

Nanoleaf introduced a new lighting technology with its smart modular light panels, first revealed at the 2016 Consumer Electronics Show. The light panels, part of the company's 'Smarter Series' of products, have smart capabilities (via WiFi) including app and voice commands, music sync and touch controls. The light panels are made with LED chips on a printed circuit board and feature a diffuser on a flat surface.

In 2020, the Essentials line of smart Bulbs & Lightstrips launched and were Nanoleaf's first products using the Thread (network protocol), developed as a faster and more secure network connection for smart home products. More recently, they announced a series of Bulbs & Lightstrips to the Essentials line that will work with Matter technology. Matter is a smart home protocol aimed at unifying the different connected devices in your home for easier setup and daily use.

== Philanthropy ==
=== Masks ===
At the start of the COVID-19 pandemic in 2020 Nanoleaf pivoted their focus to creating and distributing masks to frontline workers to supplement the PPE shortage. In total, they were able to donate over 600,000 masks to frontline workers and provide one million at a cost to other organizations in need.

=== Charitable organizations ===
In December 2020, Nanoleaf collaborated with KultureCity, a charitable organization that focuses on serving individuals with sensory needs, to create sensory rooms in public venues. These spaces are intended to serve as decompression areas for people with autism, PTSD, and other sensory sensitivities and needs. Nanoleaf provided the organization with their Canvas light panels, which were installed in the spaces to create soothing environments with gentle colors and light. The first installation was built at the Georgia Aquarium, and both Nanoleaf and KultureCity have committed to creating additional rooms across the United States.
