= Slick (magazine format) =

Magazine printed on glossy paper

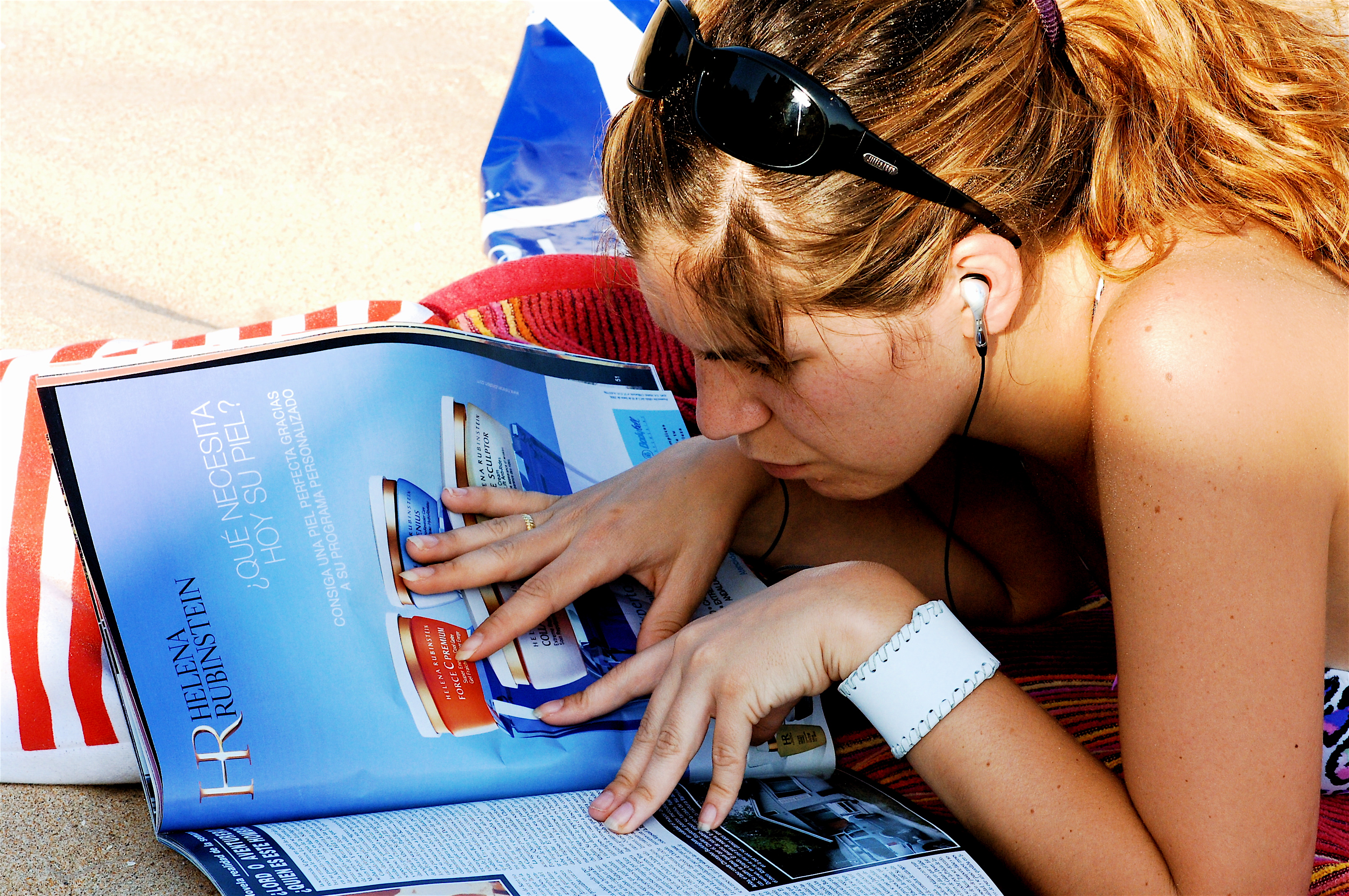
A woman reading a "slick" magazine

A slick magazine is a magazine printed on smooth, high-quality glossy paper. The term may have come into use in the 1930s, and was used to distinguish these magazines from pulp magazines, which were printed on cheap, rough-textured paper. The slicks also attempted to appeal to a more select audience. Examples of magazines regarded as slicks include Vanity Fair, Saturday Evening Post, Better Homes and Gardens, and Harper's.
