= KarlTzy =

Filipino professional gamer (born 2004)

Personal information
- Name: Karl Gabriel Nepomuceno
- Nickname(s): Karl; The Young GOAT; Face of MLBB
- Born: August 22, 2004 (age 22); Antipolo, Rizal

Current team
- Team: Team Liquid PH
- Role: Jungler
- Game: Mobile Legends: Bang Bang
- League: MPL Philippines

Career information
- Playing career: 2018–present

Team history
- 2018: Finesse Solid
- 2018–2019: SGD Omega
- 2019–2021: Bren Esports
- 2021–present: Team Liquid Philippines (TLPH)

Career highlights and awards
- 2x World champion (M2, M4); 1x World Finals MVP (M2); 1x MSC champion (2025); 6x MPL Philippines champion (S6, S11, S13, S15–S17); 1x MPL Philippines Finals MVP (S6); 2x MPL Philippines Regular Season MVP (S12, S17); 6x MPL Philippines All-Star Team 1 selection (S6, S11, S13, S15–S17)
Medal record
Esports
Representing Philippines
Southeast Asian Games
Gold medal – first place	2019 Philippines	MLBB – team
Gold medal – first place	2025 Thailand	MLBB – men's team

Karl Gabriel Nepomuceno (born August 22, 2004), commonly known by his in-game name KarlTzy or simply Karl, is a Filipino professional esports player and influencer for the multiplayer online battle arena mobile game Mobile Legends: Bang Bang. Since turning pro in 2018, he has played for four teams in his entire career, winning two world championships, one mid-season cup, and six MPL trophies.

Born and raised in Imus, Cavite, Nepomuceno began his professional Mobile Legends: Bang Bang career with Finesse Solid during Season 2. He joined SGD Omega the following season. In 2019, he represented the Philippines in Mobile Legends: Bang Bang at the 2019 Southeast Asian Games, where the national team won the gold medal.

During the pandemic, he represented the Philippines with Bren Esports to the M2 World Championships in Singapore. Joined by the likes of FlapTzy, Ribo, Coco, and Lasty, Bren became the final lifeline of the Philippines after an early lower bracket exit from co-patriots Smart Omega. Nepomuceno rallied and carried the team to the Finals, the first Filipino team to appear in the Grand Finale against Burmese representatives Burmese Ghouls. Nepomuceno won his first title with Bren and won Finals MVP in M2 with the team choosing Lancelot as their championship skin.

In the offseason of MPL Philippines Season 8, Nepomuceno joined ECHO Philippines with Tristan “Yawi” Cabrera and Frediemar “3MarTzy” Serafico to form a “super team”. After a brief setback for Seasons 9 and 10 in the local scene, Nepomuceno won his second world title with ECHO Philippines, sweeping then-defending champions Blacklist International in the Grand Finals of the M4 World Championships in Indonesia. To this day, Nepomuceno is the only player to win two-world titles from two different teams and is one of three players to win two-championships, the other being his former teammates FlapTzy and Pheww. Nepomuceno would achieve his own feat by completing the MLBB trophy cabinet by winning the Mid-Season Cup in 2025 in Saudi Arabia, the only trophy that alluded Nepomuceno's career.

== Early life ==
Karl Gabriel Nepomuceno was born on August 22, 2004, to Gabby Nepomuceno and Karina Nepomuceno. According to his father, he and his wife had doubted that he could balance the life of being a professional eSports player and staying in school and at a young age remained skeptical about the lifestyle of eSports players. As his mother put it, she shared sentiments of the unhealthy living style of professional players and had put significant punishments such as turning off the WiFi and confiscating his phone to avoid the unhealthy lifestyle.

Nepomuceno admitted that the biggest challenge for him as a pro player was his parents’ resistance to the significant lifestyle change especially because of his young age. He vowed to change their minds on the revolving stigma around professional players and that he can balance the lifestyle of being a pro and staying at school. Nepomuceno eventually graduated high school while remaining active in the internationally acclaimed professional scene of MPL Philippines.

Nepomuceno lauded his grandmother "Lola Benny" for his love and care for him until the sixth grade when his parents were Overseas Filipino Workers in Dubai.

== Professional Career (2018–present) ==
=== Finesse Solid (2018-19) ===
Nepomuceno got scouted for MPL Philippines Season 2 and became the Mid-Laner for Finesse Solid. Debuting in Season 2, he was one of the youngest to professionally debut at the age of 15. Finesse Solid–alongside ArkAngel Ownage and Aether Main, qualified for Season 2, Finesse being the third seed. In the regular season, they finished as the fifth seed going 5-4 and rallied to end the cinderella run of SxC Imbalance in the lower bracket semifinals and but loss to the eventual champions Cignal Ultra in the lower bracket finals in three games.

=== SGD Omega (2019) ===
Finesse would only see one season in MPL Philippines after its entire roster was absorbed by SGD Omega for Season 3. The team would have an underwhelming season, finishing as the seventh seed on a 4–5, 9–12 record and losing to Bren No Limit–the sister team to Bren Esports–2-0 in the elimination stage of the lower brackets. SGD Omega's lost became one of the worse placements for Nepomuceno in his entire professional career, the other being Bren Esports’ Season 8 elimination.

=== Bren Esports (2020–2021) ===
Prior to him joining Bren Esports, Nepomuceno was tapped to become a member of the 2019 Philippine national eSports team to compete in the 2019 SEA Games on home soil. Nepomuceno, at the age of 15, was one of the youngest competitors in the tournament, surrounded by future teammates Carlito “Ribo” Ribo Jr. and Allan “Lusty” Castromayor Jr. Nepomuceno and Team SIBOL faced Team Indonesia in the finals, going down in a 1–2 deficit. However, after rallying in Game 4, the team eventually won Game 5 and won the Philippines the inaugural MLBB tournament gold medal. Nepomuceno was one of the youngest to win a SEA Games Medal at the age of 15.

Nepomuceno was eventually announced to be one of the new members of Bren Esports in Season 5. Bren would finish in third place during Season 5 after a 1-2 lost to ONIC Philippines. In Season 6 he was partnered with his eventual duo David “FlapTzy” Canon–who idolized Nepomuceno and even named himself with his iconic suffix -Tzy–in honor of him. The duo would be named as the “Tzy Brothers” as both Canon and Nepomuceno were instrumental players towards Bren's success for MPL Philippines Season 6, bringing the organization its first MPL title as Bren Esports, defeating Smart Omega 4–2.

==== First World Title (2021) ====
Nepomuceno won his first world title with the team in 2021. After an early loss to Burmese Ghouls sent Bren to the lower bracket, the team mounted a remarkable run, defeating TODAK, Alter Ego, and RRQ Hoshi to reach the Grand Finals. In a dramatic best-of-seven rematch against Burmese Ghouls, Bren fell behind 2–3 but rallied in Games 6 and 7, with Nepomuceno delivering decisive performances on Brody and his signature Claude. Bren ultimately secured a 4–3 series victory, earning Nepomuceno the Finals MVP and establishing him as one of Mobile Legends’ premier players.

Following his rise to prominence, Nepomuceno faced a challenging period during Season 7. Bren Esports struggled to replicate their earlier international success, experiencing inconsistent performances in the MPL Philippines. Despite Nepomuceno's individual skill and signature hyper‑carry plays, the team failed to secure a championship and even a finals appearance, falling short in critical playoff matches. The season highlighted the difficulties of maintaining top form amidst roster changes and evolving metas.

In Season 8, Nepomuceno and Bren attempted a comeback, but recurring issues with team synergy and strategic adaptation persisted. Although he delivered standout performances, Bren consistently underperformed against emerging teams. These consecutive seasons underscored the challenges of sustaining elite-level competitiveness, marking a period of professional adversity in Nepomuceno's otherwise illustrious career.

=== Team Liquid PH (2021–present) ===
In late 2021, Nepomuceno departed Bren Esports, citing dissatisfaction with the team's scrimmage structure and a desire for new challenges. Shortly afterward, he joined ECHO Philippines, a newly formed roster featuring other prominent players, with the goal of competing at the highest level of Mobile Legends: Bang Bang with teammates Tristan "Yawi" Cabrera and Frediemar "3MarTzy" Serafico.

During MPL Philippines Season 9, Nepomuceno became the team's central carry and playmaker. ECHO finished the regular season with an 8–6 record, placing third in the standings. However, their playoff run was short-lived, as they were eliminated 0–3 by Omega Esports in the first round. Despite the early exit, Nepomuceno's performance demonstrated his continued impact as one of the league's top-tier players.

In MPL Philippines Season 10, Nepomuceno and ECHO Philippines secured a playoff run that earned them qualification for the M4 World Championship. The team reached the Season 10 finals but was defeated by Blacklist International, finishing as runners-up.

==== Second World Title (2023) ====
In January 2023, Nepomuceno won his second world title at the MLBB M4 World Championship with ECHO Philippines. The team advanced to the Grand Finals after overcoming a lower-bracket run, including a 3–1 victory over RRQ Hoshi. In the best-of-seven all-Filipino Grand Final, ECHO swept Blacklist International 4–0 to claim the championship.

Unlike his first world title at M2, Nepomuceno played a more utility-oriented and tank-jungler role, prioritizing objectives and team coordination over individual kills. His strategic contributions were critical to ECHO's dominance, as the team led the tournament in Turtle and Lord captures. The victory also marked Nepomuceno as the first player in Mobile Legends history to win two M-series world championships, solidifying his status as one of the game's most accomplished players.

In MPL PH Season 11, ECHO carried their momentum from M4, dominating the playoffs and sweeping Blacklist International 4–0 in the finals to claim the championship. KarlTzy's performance, particularly on heroes like Lancelot, earned him multiple match MVP awards and cemented his status as one of the league's premier players.

Following the MPL Philippines Season 11 championship, Nepomuceno competed in MSC 2023 where the team advanced to the semifinals but was eliminated 0–3 by ONIC Esports. ECHO later secured third place by defeating BURN x FLASH in the decider match 3–2. In MPL Philippines Season 12, Nepomuceno delivered a standout performance and was awarded the regular season MVP, however ECHO Philippines finished third in the playoffs after getting 1–3 in the lower brackets by Blacklist International.

In Season 13, following a partnership with Team Liquid, the roster competed as Liquid ECHO. The team dominated the playoffs and secured the Season 13 championship, sweeping Falcons AP Bren 4–0 in the Grand Final. They advanced to MSC 2024 when the tournament was first held in Riyadh. TLPH advanced to the knockouts, delivering a quick 3–1 win over Burmese representatives Falcons Esports but losing 1–3 to Falcons AP Bren. This was the second-consecutive MSC that Nepomuceno was defeated in semis.

In Season 14–now rebranded as Team Liquid PH–the team finished with an 8–6 record in the regular season, enough for a play-in slot. However, TLPH lost in five games to Aurora Gaming. This was Team Liquid's worst performance since the rebrand, and their worst performance since Season 9 when they were still ECHO Philippines. This also marked Nepomuceno's second-consecutive absence to the world championships–missing M5 after their loss to Blacklist and missing M6 after their lost to Aurora.

In Season 15, with the arrival of Oheb to the roster, the tandem of Nepomuceno–Soriano was nicknamed by fans as the "Babycakes Duo" which trended within the MLBB community in the Philippines. Liquid finished with a 12–2 record in the regular season and enough to secure an upper bracket berth. Nepomuceno qualified for MSC after a 4–2 win over Team Falcons PH in the lower bracket finals and getting revenge on ONIC Philippines in seven games. ONIC bested Liquid in the upper bracket finals in a 3–0 sweep. Liquid won the Season 15 championship in a full-seven-game series.

==== First Mid-Season Cup Title (2025) ====
In the knockout rounds, Team Liquid faced stiff competition but continued to build momentum. In the Grand Final against the defending champions Selangor Red Giants OG Esports, they dropped the first game but responded with four consecutive wins to claim a decisive 4–1 series victory and the MSC crown.

KarlTzy described the win as deeply meaningful, noting that the MSC had long eluded him and that this title “completes” his collection of major MLBB trophies. While Sanford “Sanford” Vinuya was awarded Finals MVP, Nepomuceno's influence as jungler and veteran leader was widely lauded, and many fans and analysts hailed him as a GOAT-level player.

With this victory, Nepomuceno became one of the few players in Mobile Legends Bang Bang history to have won the M series world championship, MPL titles, and the MSC — the achievement added the MSC championship to his previous international and regional titles

During Season 16, Team Liquid PH continued their dominant form, advancing through the playoffs with a 3–1 victory over Team Falcons PH in the semifinals. They swept the Grand Final 4–0 to secure the Season 16 championship, marking their third MPL PH title in four seasons and solidifying Nepomuceno's status as one of the league's most accomplished players. With this season 16 title, Nepomuceno now holds five MPL championship titles, the most by any player.

== National team career ==
=== Southeast Asian Games ===
Nepomuceno has two stints for the Southeast Asian esports team that represented team Philippines, that being in the 2019 SEA Games on home soil and the 2025 SEA Games in Thailand. The then-fifteen year old Nepomuceno was one of the youngest competitors in the inaugural MLBB tournament for the SEA Games. Nepomuceno helped and rallied Team Philippines to victory after a 1–2 deficit in the finals against Indonesia, winning two straight games to win the Gold 3–2. Nepomuceno failed to secure another representation for the 2021 SEA Games–the distinction went to a restructured Blacklist International roster–and the 2023 SEA Games–the distinction went to Falcons AP Bren.

Team Liquid PH was chosen to represent Team Philippines in the 2025 SEA Games after winning 3–1 over ONIC Nine Lives, the development roster of ONIC Philippines and the MDL Philippines Season 5 champions. This was Nepomuceno's second SEA Games representing Team Philippines. SIBOL was grouped in Group B joined alongside the other two top regions in the MLBB scene in Indonesia and Malaysia. SIBOL topped the group at 4–0; 8-0 and was automatically seeded in a semifinals bye-match. Nepomuceno helped the team qualify for the Philippines' fourth-consecutive gold medal finals appearance against Team Malaysia where Team SIBOL defeated the Malaysian squad, sweeping them 4–0 and retaining the SEA Games Gold in the Philippines. This is Nepomuceno's second gold medal.

=== Asian Games ===
Nepomuceno and Team Liquid PH also competed to represent Team Philippines to the inaugural MLBB Medal Match in the 2026 Asian Games in Japan. This is the first time that MLBB would be held in the Asian Games alongside multiplayer online battle arena games such as Honor of Kings. However, Nepomuceno and Team Liquid lost in the Grand Finals 1–3 to ONIC Philippines who was supposed to be the country's representatives in the inaugural Asian Games debut.

In the event of ONIC Philippines' withdrawal from the national representation for the Asian Games, Nepomuceno alongside Team Liquid participated in the second qualification matches for the 2026 Asian Games for MLBB. The team was able to defeat Team Falcons PH in 5 games to represent the Philippines in Japan.

== Seasons overview ==
Year	League	Team	Role	Domestic		International			
Year	League	Team	Role	Domestic		ESL Snapdragon	Mid Season Cup	MPL Invitational	World Championship
2018–19	MPL Philippines	Finesse Solid	Mid Lane	S3	3rd Place	–	Did not qualify	–	Did not qualify
2018–19	MPL Philippines	SGD Omega	Mid Lane	S4	3rd Place	–	Did not qualify	–	Did not qualify
2020	MPL Philippines	Bren Esports	Jungler	S5	3rd Place	–	Cancelled	–	Champions
2020	MPL Philippines	Bren Esports	Jungler	S6	Champions	–	Cancelled	Runner-Up	Champions
2021	MPL Philippines	Bren Esports	Jungler	S7	4th Place	–	Did not qualify	Did not qualify	Did not qualify
2021	MPL Philippines	Bren Esports	Jungler	S8	7th–8th	–	Did not qualify	Did not qualify	Did not qualify
2022	MPL Philippines	ECHO Philippines	Jungler	S9	5th–6th	–	Did not qualify	Runner-Up	Champions
2022	MPL Philippines	ECHO Philippines	Jungler	S10	Runner-Up	–	Did not qualify	Runner-Up	Champions
2023	MPL Philippines	ECHO Philippines	Jungler	S11	Champions	–	3rd Place	–	Did not qualify
2023	MPL Philippines	Team Liquid PH	Jungler	S12	3rd Place	–	3rd Place	–	Did not qualify
2024	MPL Philippines	Team Liquid PH	Jungler	S13	Champions	–	3rd Place	–	Did not qualify
2024	MPL Philippines	Team Liquid PH	Jungler	S14	5th-6th	–	3rd Place	–	Did not qualify
2025	MPL Philippines	Team Liquid PH	Jungler	S15	Champions	–	Champions	–	Third Runner Up
2025	MPL Philippines	Team Liquid PH	Jungler	S16	Champions	–	Champions	–	Third Runner Up
2026	MPL Philippines	Team Liquid PH	Jungler	S17	Champions	–	13th-16th Place	–	To be determined
2026	MPL Philippines	Team Liquid PH	Jungler	S18	To be determined	–	13th-16th Place	–	To be determined

== Individual Awards ==
International

- 2x MLBB World Champion (M2, M4)
- 1x MLBB Worlds Finals MVP (M2)
  - Finals MVP skin: Lancelot: Bren Esports
- 1x MLBB Mid Season Cup Champion (2025)
- 2x Southeast Asian Games Gold Medalist (2019, 2025)

Domestic

- 6x MPL Philippines Champion (Season 6, Season 11, Season 13, Season 15–Season 17)
- 1x MPL Philippines Grand Finals MVP (Season 6)
- 2x MPL Philippines Regular Season MVP (Season 12, Season 17)
- 6x MPL Philippines Team of the Season Member (Season 6, Season 11, Season 12, Season 15–Season 17)
- MLBB Player of the Year (2023)

Halls of Fame

- MLBB Worlds Greatest Players Inductee (M4)
- MPL Philippines Hall of Legends Inductee (Season 10)

Awards and achievements
Preceded by Eko "Oura" Julianto	Mobile Legends: Bang Bang World Championship Finals MVP; 2020	Succeeded by Kiel Calvin "Oheb" Soriano
Preceded by Kiel "Kielvj" Cruzem	MPL Philippines Finals MVP; Season 6 (2020)	Succeeded by Edward "Edward" Dapadap
Preceded by Rowgien "Owgwen" Unigo	MPL Philippines Regular Season MVP; Season 12 (2023)	Succeeded by Stephen "Super Marco" Requitiano
