= 2024 MPL Philippines season =

Year of Esports tournaments for Mobile Legends: Bang Bang in the Philippines

- League: MPL Philippines
- Sport: Mobile Legends: Bang Bang
- Duration: 15 March–26 May 2024 (Season 13); 16 August–20 October 2024 (Season 14)
- Teams: 8

MPL Philippines Season 13
- Top seed: Falcons AP Bren
- Season MVP: Marco "Super Marco" Requitiano (Falcons AP Bren)

MPL Philippines Season 14
- Top seed: Fnatic ONIC PH
- Season MVP: King "K1NGKONG" Perez (Fnatic ONIC PH)

2024 MPL Philippines Playoffs
- Upper Bracket champions: Liquid ECHO (Season 13); Fnatic ONIC PH (Season 14)
- Lower Bracket champions: Falcons AP Bren (Season 13); Aurora Gaming (Season 14)

2024 MPL Philippines Grand Finals
- Date: 26 May 2024 (Season 13); 20 October 2024 (Season 14)
- Venue: SM Southmall (Season 13)
- Champions: Liquid ECHO (Season 13); Fnatic ONIC Philippines (Season 14)
- Finals MVP: Sanford "Sanford" Vinuya (Liquid ECHO - Season 13); Grant "Kelra" Pillas (Fnatic ONIC Philippines - Season 14)

Seasons
- ← 2023 2025 →

The 2024 MPL Philippines Season was the seventh year of professional gameplay and the second year of development talent gameplay for the country. MPL Philippines is a professional esports league for the MOBA game Mobile Legends: Bang Bang. The season was divided into two splits: Season 13 was accompanied by MDL Philippines Season 3 while Season 14 was accompanied by MDL Philippines Season 4. Season 13 began on March 15 and concluded the season with the Grand Finals match on May 26, 2024. Meanwhile, Season 14 began on August 16th and ended with the Grand Finals match on October 20, 2024.

MDL Philippines was established as the second development league in Southeast Asia behind MDL Indonesia in 2023 and its first two seasons were played during the same year. Season 13 was the qualifying tournament for Philippine teams to the 2024 Mid-Season Cup in Riyadh. Season 14 on the other hand was the qualifying tournament for Philippine teams to the MLBB M6 World Championships in Kuala Lumpur. Only the champions and the runner-up teams qualified for both international tournaments.

MPL Philippines Season 13 was the first professional season of the league in 2024. It is succeeding a season that culminated the championship of Falcons AP Bren for the second time in league history, and the second time in world history, winning the title on home soil against ONIC Esports. Furthermore, the Mid-Season Cup is hosted for the first time outside of Southeast Asia and the first tournament bearing the rebranded name “Mid-Season Cup”. The tournament was formerly known as the “Southeast Asia Cup”. Liquid ECHO defeated the defending world champions and MPL champions Falcons AP Bren in the Grand Finals in a 4–0 sweep. This is Liquid ECHO's first title as "Liquid ECHO" and the second title under the "ECHO" brand name.

MPL Philippines Season 14 was the second professional season of the league in 2024. This season is the precursor season after the Mid Season Cup and the start of the qualifying matchups for the MLBB M6 World Championship in Malaysia. Fnatic ONIC Philippines made history by becoming the only team to have a thirteen-game winning streak, breaking the record of Blacklist International's 12-wins straight during Season 8. Moreover, this is the first time that Fnatic ONIC Philippines qualified for the M6 World Championships since Season 8 following their 3–1 victory over the defending world champions Falcons AP Bren. Furthermore, Aurora Gaming—the indirect replacement to Minana EVOS—qualified for the first time for the playoffs, the grand finals, and the M6 World Championships despite only joining the league in the present season. Fnatic ONIC Philippines won its first organizational title since its entry to the MPL Philippines pro-scene in Season 4.

Occurring in the same year was the international multi-game tournament Games of the Future 2024 which was held in Kazan, Russia. Falcons AP Bren and Blacklist International were invited to participate alongside teams that have competed during the M5 World Championships and teams that were directly invited by organizers.

== Format ==
MPL Philippines’ Seasons are split into two: The Regular Season and the Playoffs. The Regular Season consists of fourteen games. Each team competing will be playing a double-round robin tournament format, facing each other twice in the span of six to eight weeks. Only the top six teams will advance to the playoffs and the remaining two will be eliminated. Furthermore, the Regular Season instituted a new pointing system wherein:

- The team who won a 2–0 series will receive 3 points;
- The team who won a 2–1 series will receive 3 points;
- The team who lost a 2–1 series will receive 1 point;
- The team who lost a 2–0 series will receive 0 points.

=== Playoff format ===
- The Top 6 teams from the Regular Season table will advance to the playoff round. The bottom 2 will be eliminated from contention.
- Teams Seeded 5 and 6 will be facing each other for a Best of 5 series to advance to the second round in a modified King of the Hill Tournament format.
- The winning team from Match 1 will advance to face Seed 4 and play a Best of 5 series to advance to the Upper Bracket Semifinals.
- Seed 3 will be matching up with Seed 2 in the playoffs, making Seed 3 a qualifying team in the semifinals.
- All teams will be playing a Best of 5 series except for the Grand Finals which will be a Best of 7.

== Venue ==
MPL Philippines Season 13		MPL Philippines Season 14	
Regular season	Playoffs & Grand Finals	Regular season	Playoffs & Grand Finals
Shooting Gallery Studios	SM Southmall	Green Sun Hotel	Green Sun Hotel
Venue Locations for the Regular Season and the Playoffs.		Venue Locations for the Regular Season.	
Makati City, Philippines	Las Piñas City, Philippines	Makati City, Philippines	Makati City, Philippines

== Split 1 ==
=== Season 13 ===
MPL Philippines Season 13
- 2024

Tournament information
- Game: Mobile Legends: Bang Bang
- Location: Philippines
- Date: March 15–May 5, 2024 (Regular Season); May 22–May 26, 2024 (Playoffs)
- Administrator: Moonton
- Venue(s): Shooting Gallery Studios (Regular season); SM Southmall (Playoffs)
- Teams: 8
- Defending champions: AP Bren
- Purse: US$150,000

Final positions
- Champions: Liquid ECHO
- 1st runners-up: Falcons AP Bren
- 2nd runners-up: RSG Philippines
- Finals MVP: Sanford "Sanford" Vinuya (Liquid ECHO)

Season 13 was the first MPL Philippines season following the conclusion of the M5 World Championships. During Season 8, the league shifted to a franchise-based system, eliminating regional qualifiers for local teams and fixing only eight franchise teams to compete in MPL Philippines. The Philippines is the second league to adhere to the franchise-based system, the other being Indonesia. The season began on March 15 and concluded its regular season on May 5. The playoffs were held from May 22 to 26 at SM Southmall Events Center in Las Piñas

The same 8 teams will be participating in the tournament which includes: Falcons AP Bren, Blacklist International, Team Liquid PH, Minana EVOS, Fnatic ONIC PH, Smart Omega, RSG Philippines, and TNC Pro Team.

Falcons AP Bren won the Games of the Future tournament in Kazan, defeating ONIC Esports 3 games to 1. Falcons AP Bren is the only Filipino team to be part of the Top 4 as Blacklist International lost to Fire Flux Esports of Turkey during the Quarterfinals of the single-elimination bracket.

=== Teams ===
With the annual MSC 2024 tournament being held in Saudi Arabia, the tournament became the new sight for opportunities for international organization–a tournament with a $3,000,000 prize pool. International organizations have been partnering with Filipino organizations in order to fund and subsequently target the winning teams that can compete in MSC 2024.

On 19 May 2024, AP Bren announced its partnership with MPL MENA Organization Team Falcons for the season-ending playoffs. A day later, ONIC PH announced their own partnership with the European-based organization Fnatic, and a day later, ECHO announced their own partnership for the upcoming playoffs with Team Liquid. Liquid however, has announced their own acquisition of the AURA Esports franchise, thereby rebranding the team from ECHO/AURA to Team Liquid.

==== Regular season standings ====
Pos	Team	Pld	W	L	GM	GL	+/-	PTS	Qualification
1	Falcons AP Bren (Q)	14	11	3	24	8	+16	35	Advance as the First Seed in the Upper Bracket Semifinals
2	Team Liquid PH (Q)	14	9	5	21	12	+9	30	Advance to the Upper Bracket Semifinals
3	RSG Philippines (Q)	14	9	5	20	13	+7	29	Advance to the Upper Bracket Semifinals
4	Fnatic ONIC PH (Q)	14	9	5	19	10	+9	28	Advance to Round 2
5	Blacklist International (Q)	14	7	7	15	20	-5	22	Advance to Round 1
6	Minana EVOS (Q)	14	6	8	15	17	-2	21	Advance to Round 1
7	Omega Esports (E)	14	3	11	8	23	-15	11	Eliminated from Playoff Contention
8	TNC Pro Team (E)	14	2	12	6	25	-19	8	Eliminated from Playoff Contention

Updated to match(es) played on 4 May 2024. Source: https://ph-mpl.com/
(E) Eliminated; (Q) Qualified to the phase indicated

==== Weekly accolades ====
- Week 1 MVP - (TLPH) - Alston "Sanji" Pabico
- Week 2 MVP - (FNOP) - Grant "Kelra" Pillas
- Week 3 MVP - (FNOP) - Jomearie "Escalera" Santos
- Week 4 MVP - (FNOP) - Frince "Super Frince" Ramirez
- Week 5 MVP - (FCAP) - Rowgien "Owgwen" Unigo
- Week 6 MVP - (OMG) - Joshua "Ch4knu" Mangilog
- Week 7 MVP - (FCAP) - Marco "Super Marco" Requitiano

== Playoffs ==
Falcons AP Bren was the first team to qualify for the Playoffs during their Week 5, 2–0 sweep over TNC Pro Team which propelled them to an 8–1 record, seeding Fnatic ONIC PH to Number 2 following their loss to RSG Philippines during Day 1 of Week 5. Moreover, Fnatic ONIC PH was the next team to qualify for the playoffs after winning over Smart Omega in Week 5 Day 2.

After a 2–0 victory over Fnatic ONIC PH in Week 6, Minana EVOS qualified for the playoffs as the potential fifth seed for the first time since Season 9 when they were still branded as "Nexplay EVOS". This is the first playoffs for Minana EVOS since their rebrand.

TNC Pro Team misses the playoffs for the fourth-consecutive season after losing 2–0 to their Week 6 match. TNC Pro Team's last playoff appearance was their third-place finish during MPL Philippines Season 9.

Blacklist International secures the final playoff spot after winning one match against Team Liquid PH to tie the game series 1-1. That gave Blacklist International enough games to qualify for the MPL Philippines Season 13 playoffs, thereby eliminating Smart Omega from playoff contention.

After a 2–1 victory over Team Liquid PH, Falcons AP Bren finishes the regular season with an 11–3 record and 35 points, giving them the first seed in the playoffs. Team Liquid PH remained the second seed because of their total number of regular season points and due to the promptly defeat of RSG Philippines to Blacklist International which only gave RSG an additional 1 point to secure the third seed.

=== Day 1: Gauntlet Play-in ===
MPL Philippines Season 13's playoffs began with the introduction of the Philippines' continual accolades from MSC 2018 to the M5 World Championship and subsequent Games of the Future.

==== (5) Blacklist International vs. (6) Minana EVOS ====
Gauntlet Round 1	May 22	Blacklist International	3	–	2	Minana EVOS	Las Piñas
	4:00 PM (PST)	BLCK wins the series 3–2; Minana EVOS is eliminated from playoff contention					SM Southmall Events Center
		15	Game 1 Kills			9	
		6	Game 2 Kills			13	
		16	Game 3 Kills			9	
		16	Game 4 Kills			16	
		9	Game 5 Kills			5	

==== (4) Fnatic ONIC PH vs. (5) Blacklist International ====
Gauntlet Round 2	May 22	Fnatic ONIC PH	1	–	3	Blacklist International	Las Piñas
	7:30 PM (PST)	BLCK wins the series 3-1, Fnatic ONIC PH is eliminated from playoff contention					SM Southmall Events Center
		14	Game 1 Kills			5	
		5	Game 2 Kills			16	
		4	Game 3 Kills			11	
		7	Game 4 Kills			13	

=== Day 2: Upper Bracket Semifinals ===
==== (2) Liquid ECHO vs. (3) RSG Philippines ====
Upper Bracket Semifinals	May 23	Liquid ECHO	3	–	0	RSG Philippines	Las Piñas
	4:00 PM (PST)	Liquid ECHO wins the series 3-0, RSG PH moves down to the Lower Bracket Knockouts					SM Southmall Events Center
		7	Game 1 Kills			5	
		15	Game 2 Kills			7	
		15	Game 3 Kills			7	

==== (1) Falcons AP Bren vs. (5) Blacklist International ====
Upper Bracket Semifinals	May 23	Falcons AP Bren	3	–	0	Blacklist International	Las Piñas
	7:00 PM (PST)	FCAP wins the series 3-0, BLCK moves down to the Lower Bracket Knockouts					SM Southmall Events Center
		13	Game 1 Kills			2	
		15	Game 2 Kills			6	
		13	Game 3 Kills			6	

=== Day 3: Upper Bracket Finals and Lower Bracket Semifinals ===
Winner of the Upper Bracket Final match qualify for the MSC 2024, loser is relegated to the Lower Bracket Final match. Liquid ECHO qualified for MSC 2024 after winning a close Best-of-5 matchup with defending world champions Falcons AP Bren in the upper bracket finals.

==== (1) Falcons AP Bren vs. (2) Liquid ECHO ====
Upper Bracket Final	May 24	Falcons AP Bren	2	–	3	Liquid ECHO	Las Piñas
	4:00 PM (PST)	Liquid ECHO wins the series 3-2; Falcons AP Bren goes down to the Lower Bracket Finals.					SM Southmall Events Center
		10	Game 1 Kills			2	
		13	Game 2 Kills			15	
		4	Game 3 Kills			11	
		11	Game 4 Kills			6	
		16	Game 5 Kills			17	

==== (3) RSG Philippines vs. (5) Blacklist International ====
Blacklist International has appeared in all MPL Philippines Grand Finals since Season 10 and winning one of three appearances. Season 13 is the first since Season 9 where Blacklist International would miss an international tournament such as MSC 2024 and the Grand Finals.

Lower Bracket Semifinal	May 24	RSG Philippines	3	–	1	Blacklist International	Las Piñas
	7:00 PM (PST)	RSG PH wins the series 3-1; Blacklist International is eliminated from playoff contention					SM Southmall Events Center
		19	Game 1 Kills			2	
		12	Game 2 Kills			10	
		3	Game 3 Kills			9	
		12	Game 4 Kills			2	

=== Day 4: Lower Bracket Final ===
==== (1) Falcons AP Bren vs. (3) RSG Philippines ====
Winning team in this match qualify for the MSC 2024.

Lower Bracket Final	May 25	Falcons AP Bren	3	–	1	RSG Philippines	Las Piñas
	4:00 PM (PST)	FCAP wins the series 3-1; RSG PH is eliminated from playoff contention.					SM Southmall Events Center
		5	Game 1 Kills			15	
		15	Game 2 Kills			16	
		9	Game 3 Kills			11	
		14	Game 4 Kills			5	

=== Grand Final ===
==== (2) Liquid ECHO vs. (1) Falcons AP Bren ====
Liquid ECHO and Falcons AP Bren will be having a rematch in the Grand Finals following FCAP's defeat in the upper bracket finals to TLPH in 5 games. FCAP defeated RSG-PH to qualify for MSC 2024 and a slot in the Grand Finals, poised to win back-to-back titles and become the third organization in MPL history to achieve such feat.

Liquid ECHO defeated Falcons AP Bren in a 4–0 sweep Grand Finals. This series was the second sweep by Liquid ECHO in a Grand Finals matchup since S11's 4–0 sweep against Blacklist International.

Grand Final	May 26	Liquid ECHO	4	–	0	Falcons AP Bren	Las Piñas
	4:00 PM (PST)	TLPH wins the MPL Philippines S13 title, 4-0					SM Southmall Events Center
		11	Game 1 Kills			7	
		16	Game 2 Kills			6	
		13	Game 3 Kills			3	
		14	Game 4 Kills			18	

=== Playoff Bracket ===
Gauntlet Round 1 (Best of 5)
Match 1 (May 22, 2024; 4:00 PM)
5	Blacklist Intl.	3
6	Minana EVOS	2

Gauntlet Round 2 (Best of 5)
Match 2 (May 22, 2024; 8:45 PM)
4	Fnatic ONIC PH	1
5	Blacklist Intl.	3

Upper Bracket Semifinals (Best of 5)
Match 4 (May 23, 2024; 7:30 PM)
1	Falcons AP Bren	3
5	Blacklist Intl.	0
Match 3 (May 23, 2024; 4:00 PM)
2	Liquid ECHO	3
3	RSG Philippines	0
Lower Bracket Semifinals (Best of 5)
Match 6 (May 24, 2024; 8:30 PM)
3	RSG Philippines	3
5	Blacklist Int.	1

Upper Bracket Finals (Best of 5)
Match 5 (May 24, 2024; 4:00 PM)
1	Falcons AP Bren	2
2	Liquid ECHO	3
Lower Bracket Finals (Best of 5)
Match 7 (May 25, 2024; 6:00 PM)
1	Falcons AP Bren	3
3	RSG Philippines	1

Grand Finals (Best of 7)
Match 8 (May 26, 2024; 6:00 PM)
2	Liquid ECHO	4
1	Falcons AP Bren	0

=== Final Placements ===
Placement	Qualification	Team	%
Champions	MSC 2024	Liquid ECHO	$200,590
First Runner Up	MSC 2024	Falcons AP Bren	$31,090
Second Runner Up	-	RSG Philippines	$18,990
Third Runner Up	-	Blacklist International	$10,990
5th	-	Fnatic ONIC PH	$12,090
6th	-	Minana EVOS	$9,690
7th	-	Smart Omega	$4,190
8th	-	TNC Pro Team	$3,290

Alongside MPL Indonesia, the Philippines is the only lone region-country in the MPL to have two teams to qualify for MSC in Riyadh.

=== MDL Philippines Season 3 ===
==== Regular season standings ====
MDL Philippines Season 3
- 2024

Tournament information
- Game: Mobile Legends: Bang Bang
- Location: Philippines
- Date: March 12–May 12, 2024
- Administrator: Moonton
- Tournament format(s): Regular Season: Single Round Robin; Playoffs: Single Elimination
- Venue(s): Regular Season: Online Tournament; Playoffs: Shooting Gallery Studios
- Teams: 10
- Purse: US$20,000

Final positions
- Champions: RRQ Kaito (1st title)
- 1st runners-up: ECHO Proud
- 2nd runners-up: Blacklist Academy; Omega Neos

Unlike the second season of MDL Philippines, only ten teams competed in the tournament with Euphoria Esports and MHRLK Esports exiting the amateur scene.

Pos	Team	Pld	W	L	GF	GA	GD	Pts	Qualification
1	(-) RRQ Kaito (Q)	9	9	0	18	3	+15	24	Advance to the semifinals
2	(-) Omega Neos (Q)	9	6	3	13	6	+7	19	Advance to the semifinals
3	(-) Blacklist Academy (Q)	9	5	4	11	8	+3	16	Advance to the quarterfinals
4	(-) ONIC Arsenals (Q)	9	5	4	12	10	+2	15	Advance to the quarterfinals
5	(-) ECHO Proud (Q)	9	5	4	12	10	+2	15	Advance to the quarterfinals
6	(-) TNCZ4 (Q)	9	5	4	11	10	+1	14	Advance to the quarterfinals
7	(-) AP Bren XIA (E)	9	4	5	10	11	−1	13	Eliminated from Playoff contention
8	(-) RSG El Ganador (E)	9	3	6	7	13	−6	9	Eliminated from Playoff contention
9	(-) GameLab (E)	9	3	6	8	15	−7	8	Eliminated from Playoff contention
10	(-) Minana Archives (E)	9	0	9	2	18	−16	2	Eliminated from Playoff contention

Source: https://ph-mpl.com/
(E) Eliminated; (Q) Qualified for the phase indicated

=== Playoffs ===
Similar to the former playoff tournament of MPL Philippines prior to Season 13, MDL Philippines Season 3 will transition from a double-elimination bracket to a single-elimination bracket of the Top 6 teams. Teams seeded third to sixth will play in the Quarterfinals/Knockout Round and will advance to face the first and second seed in the Semifinals. All games apart from the Grand Finals will be played in a Best of 3. The Finals will be played as a Best of 5.

MDL Philippines Season 3's playoffs was held at the Shooting Gallery Studios where MPL Philippines' regular season had been hosted prior to the playoff preparation break.

Both Blacklist Academy / Blacklist Rough World Era and TLPH Proud advances to the Semifinals to face off the two top seeds in MDL Philippines, RRQ Kaito and Omega. RRQ Kaito defeated Blacklist Academy in the Semifinals of the playoffs, qualifying the team to its first Grand Finals appearance. Meanwhile, TLPH Proud defeated Omega Neos 2–0 in the Semifinals on the same day, thereby qualifying to the Grand Finals for the third consecutive season in a row in a potential three-peat scenario. They will be facing RRQ Kaito in the Grand Finals.

RRQ Kaito wins the MDL Philippines Season 3 Grand Finals, defeating the two-time defending champions TLPH Proud 3–2 in the series. RRQ is the first organization to win an international league's title in the Philippines as RRQ Kaito is a team under the RRQ organization, an Indonesian-based organization.

Quarterfinals (Best of 3)
3	Blacklist Academy	2
6	TNCZ4	0
4	ONIC Arsenals	0
5	ECHO Proud	2

Semifinals (Best of 3)
1	RRQ Kaito	2
3	Blacklist Academy	0
2	Omega Neos	0
5	ECHO Proud	2

Grand Finals (Best of 5)
1	RRQ Kaito	3
5	ECHO Proud	2

=== Final Placement ===
Placement	Team	Prize (USD)
Champions	RRQ Kaito	$3,690
Runner-Up	TLPH Proud	$2,425
3rd-4th	Blacklist Rough World Era	$1,450
3rd-4th	Omega Neos	$1,535
5th-6th	TNCZ4	$1,100
5th-6th	ONIC Arsenals	$1,125
7th	AP.Bren XIA	$715
8th	RSG El Ganador	$655
9th	GameLab	$455
10th	Minana Archives	$300

== Split 2 ==
MPL Philippines Season 14
- 2024

Tournament information
- Game: Mobile Legends: Bang Bang
- Location: Philippines
- Date: August 16–October 6, 2024 (Regular Season); October 16–October 20, 2024 (Playoffs)
- Administrator: Moonton
- Venue(s): Green Sun Hotel (Regular Season & Playoffs)
- Teams: 8
- Defending champions: Team Liquid Philippines
- Purse: US$150,000

Final positions
- Champions: Fnatic ONIC Philippines
- 1st runners-up: Aurora Gaming
- 2nd runners-up: Blacklist International
- Finals MVP: Grant "Kelra" Pillas (Fnatic ONIC PH)

=== MPL Philippines Season 14 ===
MPL Philippines Season 14 was the second split of MPL Philippines following the conclusion of the Mobile Legends: Bang Bang Mid Season Cup in Riyadh. However, the offseason MPL Philippines Season 14 have begun following the conclusion of the MPL Philippines Season 13 Grand Finals.

=== Regular season standings ===
Pos	Team	Pld	W	L	GM	GL	+/-	PTS	Qualification
1	Fnatic ONIC PH (Q)	14	13	1	27	7	+20	13	Advance as the First Seed in the Upper Bracket Semifinals
2	Falcons AP Bren (Q)	14	10	4	22	12	+10	10	Advance as the First Seed in the Upper Bracket Semifinals
3	Smart Omega (Q)	14	9	5	20	15	+5	9	Advance to the Play-in Tournament
4	Aurora Gaming (Q)	14	8	6	21	15	+6	8	Advance to the Play-in Tournament
5	Team Liquid PH (Q)	14	8	6	17	15	+2	8	Advance to the Play-in Tournament
6	Blacklist International (Q)	14	5	9	12	20	-8	5	Advance to the Play-in Tournament
7	RSG Philippines (E)	14	3	11	10	23	-13	3	Eliminated from Playoff Contention
8	TNC Pro Team (E)	14	0	14	6	28	-22	0	Eliminated from Playoff Contention

Updated to match(es) played on 10 October 2024. Source: https://ph-mpl.com/
(E) Eliminated; (Q) Qualified to the phase indicated

==== Weekly Accolades ====
Week No.	Week MVP	Team of the Week				
Week No.	Week MVP	Exp Lane	Jungler	Mid Lane	Gold Lane	Roamer
1	Andoryuuu (Smart Omega)	Ryota (Smart Omega)	Andoryuuu (Smart Omega)	Yue (Aurora Gaming)	Jowm (Smart Omega)	Ch4knu (Smart Omega)
2	Phewww (Falcons AP Bren)	Ryota (Smart Omega)	Andoryuuu (Smart Omega)	Phewww (Falcons AP Bren)	Bennyqt (Team Liquid PH)	Owgwen (Falcons AP Bren)
3	K1NGKONG (Fnatic ONIC PH)	Nibor (RSG Philippines)	KyleTzy (Falcons AP Bren)	Super Frince (Fnatic ONIC PH)	Kelra (Fnatic ONIC PH)	Light (RSG Philippines)
4	K1NGKONG (Fnatic ONIC PH)	Sanford (Team Liquid PH)	K1NGKONG (Fnatic ONIC PH)	Super Frince (Fnatic ONIC PH)	Super Marco (Falcons AP Bren)	Jaypee (Team Liquid PH)
5	K1NGKONG (Fnatic ONIC PH)	FlapTzy (Falcons AP Bren)	K1NGKONG (Fnatic ONIC PH)	Phewww (Falcons AP Bren)	Kelra (Fnatic ONIC PH)	Ch4knu (Smart Omega)
6	Hadji (Blacklist International)	Ryota (Smart Omega)	MP the King (Blacklist International)	Hadji (Blacklist International)	Kelra (Fnatic ONIC PH)	Renejay (Aurora Gaming)
7	Super Frince (Fnatic ONIC PH)	Sanford (Team Liquid PH)	K1NGKONG (Fnatic ONIC PH)	Super Frince (Fnatic ONIC PH)	Kelra (Fnatic ONIC PH)	Escalera (TNC Pro Team)
8	Andoryuuu (Smart Omega)	Edward (Aurora Gaming)	Andoryuuu (Smart Omega)	Sanji (Team Liquid PH)	Jowm (Smart Omega)	Perkz (Blacklist International)

== Playoffs ==
=== Play-in Tournament ===
==== (#3) Smart Omega vs. (#6) Blacklist International ====
The first match of the MPL Philippines playoffs was between the original rivalry between team Smart Omega and Blacklist International. Coming into the playoffs, Omega has a 4–1 record over Blacklist International, winning their matches with 2-0 and 2-1 victories during the regular season. This is also the first season which sees the MVP trio (commonly known as MV3) of "Edward" Dapadap, Kiel "Oheb" Soriano, and Imam "Hadji" Salic officially ending following Dapadap's early transfer to Aurora Gaming. Moreover, this series is notable for the return of Joshua "Ch4knu" Mangilog—who previously played for Omega Neos—returning to the pro-scene full time.

Omega's playoff drought prolongs as they fall in an upset 3-0 match against the underdogs Blacklist International who signed former MPL KH Jungler MP the King and loaned Exp Laner from Bigetron Alpha Lord JM.

Play-in Tournament	October 16	Smart Omega	0	–	3	Blacklist International	Makati City
	3:00 PM (PST)	Blacklist International wins the series, 3–0					Green Sun Hotel

==== (#4) Aurora Gaming vs. (#5) Team Liquid PH ====
The second match was between the debuting playoff team Aurora Gaming who against the defending MPL Philippines champions Team Liquid Philippines. TLPH was coming off a rough 8–6 regular season that placed them in sixth place. Initially, Aurora Gaming poised to be a formidable challenger to the former world champions, takings Games 1 and 3 unscathed of potential comebacks. However, TLPH would retaliate in Games 2 and 4 that would position them in comfortable compositions of heroes and bans. In Game 5, continual gold-lead shifts would hinder either team's ability to close off Game 5. Ultimately, Aurora Gaming defeated TLPH in the second series to face off the first seed Fnatic ONIC Philippines in the next round.

TLPH becomes the first former world champions to bow out from the MPL Philippines Season 14 playoffs following Blacklist International's advancement during the first match. Furthermore, they become the first MPL Philippines champion since Blacklist International (since the introduction of the franchise based-system) to have an early-playoff exit as the defending champions. The last time a defending champion failed to defend their title and exit earlier than expected from the playoffs was Blacklist International who failed to even qualify for playoffs in Season 9.

Play-in Tournament	October 16	Aurora Gaming	3	–	2	Team Liquid PH	Makati City
	3:00 PM (PST)	Aurora Gaming wins the series, 3–2					Green Sun Hotel

=== Upper Bracket First Round ===
==== (#2) Falcons AP Bren vs. (#6) Blacklist International ====
A rematch of the MPL Philippines Season 12 finals is reigning world champions Falcons AP Bren up against M3 World Champions Blacklist International. Blacklist however, would suffer a 3–2 defeat over the reigning world champions—a feat many were taken by surprise by the underdog team pushing the series to the five-game series.

Upper Bracket First Round	October 17	Falcons AP Bren	3	–	2	Blacklist International	Makati City
	3:00 PM (PST)	Falcons AP Bren wins the series, 3–2					Green Sun Hotel

==== (#1) Fnatic ONIC Philippines vs. (#4) Aurora Gaming ====
The 13-1 first seeded Fnatic ONIC PH defeats the debuting organization Aurora Gaming in a 3–0 sweep. This is the first upper-bracket finals appearance of the ONIC PH franchise since Season 8.

Upper Bracket First Round	October 17	Fnatic ONIC PH	3	–	0	Aurora Gaming	Makati City
	7:00 PM (PST)	Fnatic ONIC PH wins the series, 3–0.					Green Sun Hotel

=== Upper Bracket Finals & Lower Bracket Semifinals ===
==== (#1) Fnatic ONIC Philippines vs. (#2) Falcons AP Bren ====
The top two seeds of MPL Philippines matched up during the highly anticipated upper bracket finals that sees the resurging ONIC Philippines franchise compete against the consistency of the reigning defending world champions. Falcons AP Bren is also known for defeating ONIC Philippines' sister team—Fnatic ONIC Indonesia (known as ONIC Indonesia during M5), in the Grand Finals of M5 in seven games. Fnatic ONIC Philippines would 3-1 the defending world champions, qualifying for their MPL Philippines grand finals slot for the first time since Season 8, but also its berth in the M6 World Championships as the first representatives of the Philippines.

Upper Bracket Finals	October 18	Fnatic ONIC PH	3	–	1	Falcons AP Bren	Makati City
	7:00 PM (PST)	Fnatic ONIC PH wins the series, 3–1.					Green Sun Hotel

==== (#4) Aurora Gaming vs. (#6) Blacklist International ====
Aurora Gaming, known for having the services of two former Blacklist International stars in Edward Dapadap and Renejay Barcase, the underdog team faltered in a 3–0 sweep against Aurora, abruptly ending Blacklist International's playoff run in the same spot as last season.

Lower Bracket Semifinals	October 18	Aurora Gaming	3	–	0	Blacklist International	Makati City
	7:00 PM (PST)	Aurora Gaming wins the series, 3–0.					Green Sun Hotel

=== Lower Bracket Finals ===
==== (#2) Falcons AP Bren vs. (#4) Aurora Gaming ====
The first best-of-seven Lower Bracket Finals was between Falcons AP Bren and Aurora Gaming. Falcons AP Bren were fighting for a chance to go back-to-back world championship titles in the M6 World Championships while Aurora Gaming were poised to be the first newly-established organization to qualify to the finals and M6. After initially leading 3–1 in the series, Falcons AP Bren were able to make a stunning comeback in Game 5 to force Game 6. However, Aurora Gaming wins the seven-game series to qualify for the first worlds appearance and first grand finals appearance against Fnatic ONIC Philippines.

Lower Bracket Finals	October 19	Aurora Gaming	4	–	2	Falcons AP Bren	Makati City
	5:00 PM (PST)	Aurora Gaming wins the series, 4–2.					Green Sun Hotel

=== Grand Finals ===
==== (#1) Fnatic ONIC Philippines vs. (#4) Aurora Gaming ====
After leading to a 2–0 start to the series, Fnatic ONIC Philippines would stumble in Game 3 when Aurora Gaming was able to pick up certain comfort picks that pushed the series into five games. However, with Fnatic ONIC's continuous dominance—coming from rebounding from the previous games' mistakes, the team took it to match point. However, after another game of potentially winning ONIC its first MPL title in its Philippines franchise, Aurora Gaming was able to win Game 5 to push the series into six games.

The Grand Finals for MPL Philippines Season 14 would be the first since MPL Philippines Season 7 to go to seven games. Fnatic ONIC Philippines defeats Aurora Gaming in seven games after a comeback victory during the last minute of gameplay where Dapadap set the play to stun two members of the FNOC squad unknowingly to get kicked by Parro to eventually give Fnatic ONIC 4 kills to none. This is Fnatic ONIC's first title as an organization since Season 4.

Grand Finals	October 20	Fnatic ONIC Philippines	4	–	3	Aurora Gaming	Makati City
	5:30 PM (PST)	Fnatic ONIC Philippines wins the Grand Finals, 4—3.					Green Sun Hotel

==== Playoff Bracket ====
Play-in Round
3	Smart Omega	0
6	Blacklist Int.	3
4	Aurora Gaming	3
5	Team Liquid PH	2

Upper Bracket Semifinals
2	Falcons AP Bren	3
6	Blacklist Int.	2
1	Fnatic ONIC PH	3
4	Aurora Gaming	0
Lower Bracket Knockouts
6	Blacklist Int.	0
4	Aurora Gaming	3

Upper Bracket Finals
2	Falcons AP Bren	1
1	Fnatic ONIC PH	3
Lower Bracket Finals
2	Falcons AP Bren	2
4	Aurora Gaming	4

Grand Finals
1	Fnatic ONIC PH	4
4	Aurora Gaming	3

==== Final Placements ====
Placement	Team	Qualification	Prize Pool
Grand Champions	Fnatic ONIC Philippines	M6	$46,680
1st Runner Up	Aurora Gaming	M6	$29,160
2nd Runner Up	Falcons AP Bren	N/A	$19,760
3rd Runner Up	Blacklist International	N/A	$10,860
5th–6th	Team Liquid PH	N/A	$11,060
5th–6th	Smart Omega	N/A	$10,460
7th–8th	RSG Philippines	N/A	$4,960
7th–8th	TNC Pro Team	N/A	$3,160

=== MDL Philippines Season 4 ===
During the second split MDL Philippines Season 4, the league announced its first local qualifying tournaments for local teams in Luzon, Visayas, and Mindanao. This is the first open-qualifier tournament by the MPL-MDL franchise in the Philippines since MPL Philippines Season 7 prior to their transition to a franchise-base system for the professional league. MDL Philippines Season 4 will be travelling across the country for it to qualify deserving teams matching up against all previously-competing teams in Season 3 which includes the defending champions RRQ Kaito.

All colored regions/administrative divisions/independent and highly urbanized cities are participating in MDL Philippines Season 4's local qualifying tournaments.

Island Cluster	Administrative Division	Date of Qualifiers	Qualified Team
Luzon	City of Caloocan	July 28, 2024	Kyros Xlaw Esports
Luzon	Province of Bulacan	August 3, 2024	Kapitan Ger Esports
Luzon	Bicol Region	August 18, 2024	Not announced
Visayas	Province of Cebu	August 17–18, 2024	Metacore Bai
Visayas	Province of Iloilo	August 11, 2024	Mayhem Nation
Mindanao	Province of Zamboanga del Norte	August 8–9, 2024	Egoist Main
Mindanao	Province of Davao del Norte	August 15, 2024	Brew Forever Young

== Controversies ==
=== Season 13 ===
==== Controversial comment ====
Season 13 was known for having a controversial occurrence during the Third Week of Professional Play when Ian "Fywdchickn" Hohl of Gaimin Gladiators commented in a stream of his thoughts of MPL Philippines Season 13. Initially, Hohl critiqued MPL Philippines and MPL Indonesia together, citing that the production of MPL Indonesia was relatively better than that of MPL Philippines but quickly reiterated that the Philippines' gameplay is substantially better. During the first day of the third week, Hohl's image alongside the exact comment he made was posted during the livestream which the casters have quoted "MPL Philippines is boring".

Continuous backlash was thrown at Hohl for his comments with even players being asked to comment regarding the issue which included David "FlapTzy" Canon and King "K1NGKONG" Perez of Falcons AP Bren and Fnatic ONIC PH to name a few, respectively. In retaliation, Hohl made a public response regarding the matter on his personal YouTube channel which he criticized MPL Philippines' production for manipulating its fans.

In a podcast episode from Mara "Mara" Aquino–one of the hosts whom quoted the comment made by Hohl, discussed it alongside David "Assassin Dave" Mao–host-turned head coach in North America, regarding the quote. Hohl personally apologized to Aquino (whom she thanked for posting his response video) following the backlash she received upon the video's posting, to which Aquino affirmed Hohl that it was okay. He also gave thanks to Johnmar "OhMyV33Nus" Villaluna who made a different video citing his comments regarding the issue.

==== Game Fixing Controversy ====
On 25 April 2024, Francis "Duckeyyy" Glindro posted on his official Facebook Page a screenshot of former University of Santo Tomas Teletigers Esports Club Head Coach Jigen Paul "Jigen Paul" Masangkay's profile alongside a messenger conversation allegedly working a deal with amateur players to game fix certain matches. The conversation asked an unidentified individual if he/she is willing to pay a ₱100,000 fee (US$1,734.97) to game fix three MPL or MDL Philippines matches. Following the allegations, all MPL organizations and amateur teams have released statements regarding the matter and have launched independent investigations regarding the allegations.

At 9:55 PM of the same day, TNCZ4, the MDL Team affiliated to TNC Pro Team and Z4 Esports have suspended Jhonjie Paul "Jiee" Dela Rosa following match-making allegations surfaced online with tagged screenshots of his conversations with an unidentified individual. Furthermore, Z4 Esports' co-founded JC "King Cosmos" Garcia had inquired a league-wide investigation of the matter.

On 26 April, RSG Philippines released a statement that two amateur players from their affiliated MDL team, RSG-El Ganador Esports in Raven "Aeris" Arellano and Christian John "Nyija" Calantoc were guilty of the match-making allegations and have terminated their rookie contracts following the ordeal.

== Awards ==
=== Season 13 ===
Season 13 Awards
Award Name		Recipient	Team
MPL Philippines Hall of Legends Inductee(s)		David "FlapTzy" Canon	Falcons AP Bren
MPL Philippines Hall of Legends Inductee(s)		Kairi "Kairi" Rayosdelsol	ONIC Esports
ALAMAT All-Star Team Selection	Head Coach	Francis "Duckyy" Glindro	Falcons AP Bren
ALAMAT All-Star Team Selection	Exp Lane	Natanael "Nathzz" Estrologo	RSG Philippines
ALAMAT All-Star Team Selection	Jungler	Michael "KyleTzy" Sayson	Falcons AP Bren
ALAMAT All-Star Team Selection	Mid Lane	Alston "Sanji" Pabico	Liquid ECHO
ALAMAT All-Star Team Selection	Gold Lane	Marco "Super Marco" Requitiano	Falcons AP Bren
ALAMAT All-Star Team Selection	Roamer	Rowgien "Owgwen" Unigo	Falcons AP Bren
Season 13 Rookie of the Season Award		Nomed	TNC Pro Team
Season 13 Regular Season MVP		Marco "Super Marco" Requitiano	Falcons AP Bren
Season 13 Grand Finals MVP		Sanford "Sanford" Vinuya	Liquid ECHO
Season 13 Sportsmanship Awardee		Kenneth "Yue" Tadeo	Blacklist International
Season 13 Freshest Face Awardee		Edward "Edward" Dapadap	Blacklist International
Season 13 Best Team Content		RSG Philippines	
Season 13 Best Team Correspondent(s)		Dannica "Dannica" Suazo	Blacklist International
Season 13 Best Team Correspondent(s)		Anna "AnnaBae" Marcelo	FNATIC ONIC PH
Season 13 Best English Talent		Renmar "Reptar" Sta. Cruz	
Season 13 Best Tagalog Talent		Theodore "Uomi" Ignacio	

=== Season 14 ===
Award	Recipient			Team
Regular Season MVP	King "K1NKONG" Perez			Fnatic ONIC Philippines
Finals MVP	Grant "Kelra" Pillas			Fnatic ONIC Philippines
Most Improved Player	Andrew "Andoryuuu" Flora			Smart Omega
Season Team Selections
Fans' All-Star Team
Exp Lane	Jungler	Mid Lane	Gold Lane	Roamer
Edward "Edward" Dapadap (Aurora Gaming)	Jonard "Demonkite" Caranto (Aurora Gaming)	Kenneth "Yue" Tadeo (Aurora Gaming)	Grant "Kelra" Pillas (Fnatic ONIC Philippines)	Joshua "Ch4knu" Mangilog (Smart Omega)
Alamat All-Star Team 1
Exp Lane	Jungler	Mid Lane	Gold Lane	Roamer
David "FlapTzy" Canon (Falcons AP Bren)	Karl "K1NGKONG" Perez (Fnatic ONIC Philippines)	Frince "Super Frince" Ramirez (Fnatic ONIC Philippines)	Grant "Kelra" Pillas (Fnatic ONIC Philippines)	Joshua "Ch4knu" Mangilog (Smart Omega)
Alamat All-Star Team 2
Exp Lane	Jungler	Mid Lane	Gold Lane	Roamer
Sanford "Sanford" Vinuya (Team Liquid Philippines)	Andrew "Andoryuuu" Flora (Smart Omega)	Angelo "Pheww" Arcangel (Falcons AP Bren)	Marco "Super Marco" Requitiano (Falcos AP Bren)	Renejay "Renejay" Barcase (Aurora Gaming)

== See also ==
- MPL Philippines
- MPL Indonesia
- Mobile Legends: Bang Bang
- Mobile Legends: Bang Bang Mid Season Cup
- Mobile Legends: Bang Bang World Championship
