= 2024 MLBB Mid Season Cup =

7th edition of Mobile Legends: Bang Bang Mid Season Cup

2024 Mobile Legends: Bang Bang Mid Season Cup
- 2024

Tournament information
- Game: Mobile Legends: Bang Bang
- Dates: 28 June–14 July 2024
- Administrator: Moonton, Esports World Cup
- Tournament format(s): Group stage Single Round Robin Format; Playoffs; Single-elimination Format
- Host(s): Riyadh, Saudi Arabia
- Participants: 16 teams
- Purse: $3,000,000
- Website: https://esportsworldcup.com

Final positions
- Champion: (Malaysia) Selangor Red Giants
- 1st runners-up: (Philippines) Falcons AP Bren
- 2nd runners-up: (Philippines) Liquid ECHO (Singapore) NIP Flash
- MVP: Muhammad Haqqullah "Sekys" Ahmad Shahrul Zaman (SRG)

The 2024 Mobile Legends: Bang Bang Mid Season Cup, commonly referred to as MSC 2024, was the seventh edition of the Mobile Legends: Bang Bang Mid Season Cup, an annual mid-year international esports tournament for the mobile game Mobile Legends: Bang Bang organized by Moonton.

MSC 2024 was the first edition of the tournament bearing the name "Mid Season Cup", formerly known as the "Southeast Asia Cup". The tournament was rebranded to the Mid Season Cup in lieu of the Southeast Asia Cup due to its venue, hosted by the Kingdom of Saudi Arabia, the first tournament in MLBB to be held outside of Southeast Asia and the expansion of Mobile Legends: Bang Bang globally. Also following the previous edition in Phnom Penh, the tournament included new regions apart from Southeast Asia organizations from competing. Furthermore, it has the largest prize pool so far in any MLBB professional tournament in history, boasting a $3 million prize pool with the champions winning a prize of $1 million.

Selangor Red Giants from Malaysia defeated the M5 world champions from the Philippines, Falcons AP Bren, 4–3, in a best-of-seven series. This is the first time that Malaysia has won an international tournament officiated by Moonton.

Defending champions ONIC Esports were eliminated in the group stage, setting a knockout stage that saw Indonesia finish its worst placement in MSC history with both of its representatives getting eliminated in the group stage. This iteration of the tournament showcases the first time that an Indonesian representative has not qualified for the playoffs/knockouts.

== Background ==
MSC 2024 was the first edition of the annual tournament held in the City of Riyadh. Apart from MSC 2024, the Mobile Legends: Bang Bang Women's Invitational (MWI) is also hosted in Riyadh as part of the 2024 Esports World Cup. The announcement of the Mid Season Cup was done in January 2024 following certain leaks that MSC is heading to the Middle East, specifically Saudi Arabia.

Previously, the tournament was named as the "Southeast Asia Cup", a regional tournament for teams in the Southeast Asian region. However, during MSC 2023, the addition of Turkish, North American and Chinese teams were taken into consideration the point of the name "Southeast Asia Cup" in the first place. Game developers Moonton released the Mobile Legends: Bang Bang 2024 Roadmap during the beginning of 2024.

The addition of the Mobile Legends: Bang Bang in the 2024 Esports World Cup was likely due to the partnership between Moonton and Qiddiya City, the entertainment megaproject launched by the Kingdom of Saudi Arabia. Moonton explained that the reinforced partnership between it and Qiddiya is seen as both organization's "commitment to deliver captivating experiences to global communities."

With its participation in the 2024 Esports World Cup, MSC 2024's prize pool featured a hefty-increase from $300,000 to $3 million. MSC 2024's prize pool is part of the $60 million cumulative prize pool which also includes the prize pool for the different esports titles, $7.6 million for qualifiers and $1.1 million for MVP awards. MSC 2024's prize pool was identical to the prize pools of PUBG Mobile and Honor of Kings. These three games' prize pool are just behind Dota 2's prize pool of $5 million.

=== Patch ===
MSC 2024 was played on Patch 1.8.92 which was released on 19 June 2024 wherein certain adjustments were made to the in-game equipment and hero skills. These included nerfs and buffs and adjustments. The new hero named Zhuxin is not available for utilization and playing for MSC 2024 in lieu of new, revamped, buffed, and nerfed items.

Patch 1.8.92
New Hero Zhuxin, Beacon of Spirits
Role:		Mage
Skills		Effects
Skill 1:	Fluttering Grace	Zhuxin deals Magic Damage to all enemies in a fan-shaped area and applies 1 stack of Soul Snare.; Zhuxin also steals Movement Speed from all enemy heroes hit.
Skill 2:	Lantern Flare	Holding the Button: Zhuxin continuously consumes Mana while the Spirit Lantern can be moved with the skill button, dealing Magic Damage to all enemies within range and applying Soul Snare to enemy heroes hit.; Releasing the Button: Throws all captured enemies to the target location, dealing Magic Damage to all enemies in the area.
Ultimate:	Crimson Beacon	Zhuxin blinks to the target location while gaining a shield. While flying, she creates a field around her.; The field deals Magic Damage and applies Soul Snare stacks to enemies.
Hero Adjustments
Hero/Entity	Type of Adjustment	Notes
Zhask	Attribute Adjustment	Nightmaric Spawn now deals basic attack continuously. Dominator's Descent now allows user to select area for enhanced Nightmaric Spawn.
Lord	New Effect	When aggro, the Physical Penetration is increased by 10% per second. Stacks up to 10 times.
Item(s)
New Item(s)
Skypiercer		Lethality: Executes the hero if their HP is lower than 4%. Increases the threshold with stacks gained from kills.
Reworked & Improved Item(s):
Thunder Belt; Twilight Armor; Glowing Wand; War Axe

== Venue ==
MSC 2024 was announced to be held in Riyadh, Saudi Arabia. The wildcard stage was held at the Festival area of Riyadh's Boulevard City, while the group stage, knockout stage and the Grand Finals will be held at Square 2 of Boulevard City, also known as the 5V5 Arena or the Amazon Arena for sponsorship purposes.

Wildcard Stage	Group Stage	Knockout Stage and Grand Finals
Riyadh, Saudi Arabia
Boulevard City Square 2 Amazon Arena
		2024 MLBB Mid Season Cup is located in Saudi Arabia

== Qualified teams ==
Qualifying for the MSC 2024 tournament comes from the competing nation's Mobile Legends: Bang Bang Professional League, commonly known as "MPL". However, regional/non-MPL qualifiers in the North America, Turkey, Myanmar, and Chinese regions were also held to broaden the reach of the Championship's teams.

All highlighted nations have one or two participating teams in MSC 2024.

MSC 2024 was composed of the following twelve regions that automatically send 15 teams combined:

Region	League	Qualification method	Team name	ID	Group
Philippines	MPL Philippines	MPL Philippines Season 13 Champions	(Philippines) Liquid Echo	TLPH	C
Philippines	MPL Philippines	MPL Philippines Season 13 First Runner-ups	(Philippines) Falcons AP Bren	FCAP	D
Indonesia	MPL Indonesia	MPL Indonesia Season 13 Champions	(Indonesia) Fnatic ONIC ID	FNOC	B
Indonesia	MPL Indonesia	MPL Indonesia Season 13 Runners-up	(Indonesia) EVOS Glory	EVOS	A
Middle East and North Africa	MPL MENA	MPL MENA Season 5 Champions	(Saudi Arabia) Team Falcons	FLCN	B
Middle East and North Africa	MPL MENA	Highest-Ranking Saudi Team	(Saudi Arabia) Twisted Minds	TWIS	C
Latin America	MPL LATAM	MPL LATAM Season 1 Champions	(Brazil) RRQ Akira	RRQ	A
Malaysia	MPL Malaysia	MPL Malaysia Season 13 Champions	(Malaysia) Selangor Red Giants	SRG	B
Singapore	MPL Singapore	MPL Singapore Season 7 Champions	(Singapore) NIP Flash	NPFL	A
Cambodia	MPL Cambodia	MPL Cambodia Season 6 Champions	(Cambodia) SeeYouSoon	SYS	B
Eastern Europe and Central Asia	MLBB Continental Championships	MLBB Continental Championships Season 3 Champions	(Russia) Team Spirit	TS	C
Myanmar	MSC 2024 Myanmar Qualifier	MSC 2024 Myanmar Qualifier Champions	(Myanmar) Falcon Esports	FCON	D
Turkey	MLBB Türkiye Championships	MLBB Türkiye Championships Season 3 Champions	(Turkey) Fire Flux Esports	FF	A
North America	MLBB North America Challenger Tournament	MLBB North America Challenger Tournament Spring 2024 Champions	(United States) Cloud9	C9	D
China	MSC 2024 China Qualifier	MSC 2024 China Qualifier Champions	(China) Xianyou Gaming	XYG	D

In addition, one team will qualify for MSC 2024 via the 8-team Wildcard Tournament.

Region	League	Qualification method	Team name	ID	Group
Latin America	MPL LATAM	MPL LATAM Season 1 Runners-up	(Peru) Entity7	E7	A
Malaysia	MPL Malaysia	MPL Malaysia Season 13 Runners-up	(Malaysia) HomeBois	HB	B
Eastern Europe and Central Asia	MLBB Continental Championships	MLBB Continental Championships Season 3 First Runner-ups	(Russia) Brute Force	BF	B
Turkey	MLBB Türkiye Championships	MLBB Türkiye Championships Season 3 First Runner-ups	(Turkey) S2G Esports	S2G	A
South Asia	MLBB Champion Battles	MLBB Champion Battles Season 3 Champions	(Nepal) Trained to Kill	T2K	B
Mekong Region	M Challenge Cup	M Challenge Cup Season 3 Champions	(Vietnam) Zino Zenith	ZEN	A
China	MSC 2024 China Qualifier	MSC 2024 China Qualifier First Runner-ups	(China) KeepBest Gaming	KBG	A
Mongolia	MSC 2024 Mongolia Qualifier	MSC 2024 Mongolia Qualifier Champions	(Mongolia) IHC Esports	IHC	B

== Qualified rosters ==
=== Group Stage ===
Team Name	Short Name	League	Head coach	Asst. Coach(es)	Main Five					Substitute(s)
Team Name	Short Name	League	Head coach	Asst. Coach(es)	Exp Lane	Jungle	Mid Lane	Gold Lane	Roamer	Substitute(s)
Fnatic ONIC ID	FNOC	MPL-ID	Yeb (Denver Miranda)	Adi (Adi Asyauri)	Lutpiii (Lutpi Ardianto)	Kairi (Kairi Rayosdelsol)	S A N Z (Gilang)	CW (Calvin Winata)	Kiboy (Nicky Pontonuwu)	Albertt (Albert Iskandar)
Fnatic ONIC ID	FNOC	MPL-ID	Yeb (Denver Miranda)	Adi (Adi Asyauri)	Lutpiii (Lutpi Ardianto)	Kairi (Kairi Rayosdelsol)	S A N Z (Gilang)	CW (Calvin Winata)	Kiboy (Nicky Pontonuwu)	Butsss (Muhammad Sanubari)
EVOS Glory	EVOS	MPL-ID	G (Afrindo Valentino)	Caleb (Tesista Kayleb)	Fluffy (Regi Marviola)	Anavel (Junisen Young Lo)	Claw Kun (Adriansyah Lesmana)	Branz (Jabran Wiloko)	DreamS (Rachmad Wahyudi)	Panser (Thimothy Tonny)
Liquid ECHO	TLPH	MPL-PH	Tictac (Harold Reyes)	Cjay	Sanford (Sanford Vinuya)	KarlTzy (Karl Nepomuceno)	Sanji (Alston Pabico)	Bennyqt (Frederic Gonzales)	Jaypee (Jaypee dela Cruz)	Zaida (Justine Palma)
Falcons AP Bren	FCAP	MPL-PH	Ducky (Francis Glindro)	Trebor (Robert Sanchez)	FlapTzy (David Canon)	KyleTzy (Michael Sayson)	Pheww (Angelo Arcangel)	Super Marco (Stephen Requitiano)	Owgwen (Rowgien Unigo)	Pandora (Vincent Unigo)
Team Falcons	FLCN	MPL-MENA	Zico (John Dizon)	Paoweeburn	Ding (Danver Canja)	KENJI (Amir Mohamed)	Goodnight (Jaylord Bacog)	Lark (Abdullah Alshammari)	Super (Ahmad Alzaglul)	Alpho (Ahmed Aly)
Twisted Minds	TWIS	MPL-MENA	Lyrick (Hendrich Clahi)	Mike Sama (Ren Diong)	Sanji (Ayman Alqarni)	Lio (Mahomoud Elsayed)	Cuffin (Muath Alkoraini)	Saano (Sulaiman Alrashdi)	Trolll (Moayed Kharaba)	Tarzan (Mohammed Kharabah)
Twisted Minds	TWIS	MPL-MENA	Lyrick (Hendrich Clahi)	Mike Sama (Ren Diong)	Sanji (Ayman Alqarni)	Lio (Mahomoud Elsayed)	Cuffin (Muath Alkoraini)	Saano (Sulaiman Alrashdi)	Trolll (Moayed Kharaba)	Maro (Amr Amin)
Selangor Red Giants	SRG	MPL-MY	Arcadia (Michael Angelo Bocado)	OzoraVeki (Poon Kok Sing)	Kramm (Mark Genzon Sojero Rusiana)	Sekys (Muhammad Haqqullah bin Ahmad Shahrul Zaman)	Stormie (Hazziq Danish bin Mohamad Rizwan)	Innocent (John Vincent Banal)	Yums (Muhammad Qayyum Ariffin bin Mohd Suhairi)	Gojes (Ilman Zareef bin Zulkifli)
NIP Flash	NPFL	MPL-SG	Adammir (Adam Ee)	Zarate	Diablo (Yeo Wee Lun)	Hadess (Jaymar Lazaro)	KurtTzy (Jankurt Matira)	Vanix (Keith Lim Wei Jun)	Lolsie (Bellamy Yeov)	/ JPL (Akihiro Furusawa)
NIP Flash	NPFL	MPL-SG	Adammir (Adam Ee)	Zarate	Diablo (Yeo Wee Lun)	Hadess (Jaymar Lazaro)	KurtTzy (Jankurt Matira)	Vanix (Keith Lim Wei Jun)	Lolsie (Bellamy Yeov)	Pooskie
SeeYouSoon	SYS	MPL-KH	CatGod (Chhim Vitou)	PARAGON (Sam Sophanny)	Felix (Leng Kimhak)	MP the King (Michael Endino)	Raa (Sovann Chanmakara)	Souuul (Kennt Baesa)	BOXI (Sok Viera)	Trabot
RRQ Akira	RRQ	MPL-LATAM	Cabral (Godman Cabral)	Ybig	Tekashi (Arthur Nascimento)	Kiing (Lucas Godoy)	Seigen (Matheus Lima)	Gustalagusta (Gustavo Lima)	Luiizz (Luiz Alves)	Blink (Gabriel Favoreto)
Team Spirit	TS	MCC	Lil (Ruslan Degtev)	Vren (Vrendon Pesebre)	Kid Bomba (Mathaios Chatzilakos)	Marl (Sergey Finashev)	Sunset Lover (Kemiran Kochkarov)	Hiko (Pak Anton Igorevich)	SAWO (Stanislav Reshnyak)	Soloist
Fire Flux Esports	FF	MTC	Ospreay (Vladimir Gonchar)	Badgalseph (Sacit Arslan)	Alien (Bariş Ali Çakır)	Tienzy (Sidar Menteşe)	Rosa (Ahmet Taha Batır)	Sunshine (Emre Sarı)	APEX47 (Furkan Akbulut)	Finarfin (Kutay Artık)
Cloud9	C9	NACT	Midnight (Neil De Guzman)	Sir Rose (Martin Bautista)	Mielow (Chris Enobio)	MobaZane (Michael Cosgun)	Marqt (Marco Lacson)	Basic (Peter Lozano)	Cole World (Chris Cartagenas)	Kevy
Falcon Esports	FCON	MSC-MM Qualifier	Kalama (Kaung Htet Oo)	Ar Sy (Rodel Cruz)	Royal Milk (Arkar Pyae)	Daxx (Kaung Sett)	Mok (Moe Ko Ko)	Beni (Min Swan Kon)	KidX (Yehtet Sithu)	J3X (Kaung Min Khan)
Xianyou Gaming	XYG	MSC-CN Qualiier	Guard (Amos Ker Zhen Shun)	Little	Kielvj (Kiel Cruzem)	Zzzed	Yione	Loong (Tang Zelong)	GodYang (Yang Yang)	CHMA (Sour Mara)

=== Wildcard Stage ===
Team Name	Short Name	League	Head coach	Asst. Coach(es)	Main Five					Substitute(s)
Team Name	Short Name	League	Head coach	Asst. Coach(es)	EXP Lane	Jungle	Mid Lane	Gold Lane	Roamer	Substitute(s)
HomeBois	HB	MPL-MY	Pabz (Khairul Azman bin Mohd Sharif)	Jeff (Jeffrey Manforte)	Sepat (Muhammad Irfan bin Aujang)	Chibi (Muhammad Nazhan bin Mohd Nor)	Udil (Muhammad Julian Adriansyah)	Nets (Kenneth Sablande Barro)	Xorn (Mohammad Zul Hisham bin Mohd Noor)	Mal (Muhammad Akmal bin Rozali)
Entity7	E7	MPL-LATAM	BlackJax (Ignacio Lucumi)	Ericber	Markinho (Marco Colque)	Hide on bush (Facundo Ledesma)	Chan (Darien Barraza)	Fury (Angel Samuel)	Erwin (Rodrigo Herenu)	Crissangel
Brute Force	BF	MCC	Pao (Ren Villanueva)	—	Marbon (Ildarovich Gabdrakhmanov)	Mashiro (Cavadov Kamil)	Kodjikk (Baibulsinov Eduardovich)	Black merch (Falin Yurievich)	Fangor (Gorin Sergeevich)	El Gringo (Khamikov Shokhin)
S2G Esports	S2G	MTC	demigod (Fatih Al)	Boranxcaglar (Uğurcan Arslan)	Lunar (Mehmet Ibrahim Ilgun)	Kazue (Mehmed Akif Öztürk)	Begin (Emir Gözcü)	Sigibum (Şiyar Akbulut)	Qaro (Ahmet Yaren)	arion (Uğurcan Arslan)
Zino Zenith	ZEN	MCC-M	Carlo (John Argonza)	—	Hehehehehehe (Lâm Văn Đạt)	Jowga (Nguyễn Văn Tô Đô)	Shocker (Justin Guanga)	Zippx (Kyaw Zin Bo)	GNART (Phạm Ngọc Trạng)	Meow (Nguyễn Đức Nam)
Trained to Kill	T2K	MCB	Youngin (Daryl Ng Jun Da)	Basanta	Masarap (Aayush Bhandari)	Yahiko (Aayush Rai)	Bobe	Vvitch	APEX	Nachz
IHC Esports	IHC	MSC-MN Qualifier	Sparco (Temuujin Erdenebaatar)	—	Aizn (Enkhbat Munkhharaa)	Zxaura (Bagabandi Tegshjargal)	Forbid (Amarmurun Mandah)	Bebex (Erdenemunkh Chinsukh)	Ethan (Batbold Batjargal)	—
KeepBest Gaming	KBG	MSC-CN Qualifier	Webby (Chen Jiawei)	—	Siyu (Gao Yifan)	Saxa (Kenneth Fedelin)	LMU (Shen Yuan)	Wawawa (Chen Jiajie)	Tracy (Damasco Danielle)	Peach (Yang Daizhi)
KeepBest Gaming	KBG	MSC-CN Qualifier	Webby (Chen Jiawei)	—	Siyu (Gao Yifan)	Saxa (Kenneth Fedelin)	LMU (Shen Yuan)	Wawawa (Chen Jiajie)	Tracy (Damasco Danielle)	Tides (Yang Shangteng)

== Group and Wildcard Draws ==
=== Group Draw ===
The Group Draw for the upcoming MSC 2024 was announced via the official Facebook page for Mobile Legends Esports. These include the dates of the tournaments' stages such as the Wild Cards and the Group Stages. Moreover, the post also announced the rules for the upcoming Group Draw for MSC 2024.

Group Draw:

- All 16 qualified teams for the Group Stage will be split into 2 Pools: Pool 1 and Pool 2.
- Pool 1 includes the Champions and Runners-up for MPL Philippines and MPL Indonesia's recently concluded seasons, all other teams including the lone-team that have qualified via the Wild Card tournament will be put in Pool 2.
- The Group Draw order will be ABCD→ABCD→ABCD→ABCD until all teams have been grouped.
- There will be no avoidance principle for teams from the same region.
- Team As from the Group Draw order will all be Pool 1 teams while the remaining teams will come from Pool 2.
- The Group Draw was not broadcast but was announced on the official website of Mobile Legends Esports.

=== Wildcard Draw ===
The Wildcard draw was also announced in the same post.

Wildcard Draw:

- All 8 Wildcard teams will be put into one pool.
- The first drawn team will be put in Group A and the second drawn team will be put in Group B. This system will repeat until all teams have been separated into two groups of four teams. (Example, 1A, 2B, 3A, 4B, etc.)

Group Draw Pools
Pool 1
Liquid Echo	Fnatic ONIC ID	Falcons AP Bren	EVOS Glory
Pool 2
Selangor Red Giants	SeeYouSoon	Falcon Esports	Team Spirit
Fire Flux Esports	Cloud 9	RRQ Akira	Xianyou Gaming
NIP Flash	Team Falcons	Twisted Minds	Wild Card Qualifier

MSC 2024 Group Draw
Group A	Group B	Group C	Group D
EVOS Glory	Fnatic ONIC ID	Liquid Echo	Falcons AP Bren
Fire Flux Esports	SeeYouSoon	Wild Card Qualifier	Xianyou Gaming
NIP Flash	Selangor Red Giants	Twisted Minds	Cloud 9
RRQ Akira	Team Falcons	Team Spirit	Falcon Esports

MSC 2024 Wildcard Draw
Group A	Group B
Entity7	Brute Force
KeepBest Gaming	HomeBois
S2G Esports	IHC Esports
Zino Zenith	Trained to Kill

== Wild Card rounds ==
Teams qualifying for the Wild Card tournament were divided into two groups of four teams each, playing in a single round-robin format. Matches in the wild card rounds were scheduled to be played from June 28–30. All matches in the elimination phase were a best-of-one series, with only the top seed per group qualifying for the decider match that determined which team will advance to the group stage. The decider match was a best-of-five series.

=== Group A ===
Pos	Team	GP	W	L	Qualification	E7	ZEN	KBG	S2G
1	Entity7	3	3	0	Qualified for the Decider Match	—	1–0	1–0	1–0
2	Zino Zenith	3	2	1	Eliminated	0–1	—	1–0	1–0
3	KeepBest Gaming	3	1	2	Eliminated	0–1	0–1	—	1–0
4	S2G Esports	3	0	3	Eliminated	0–1	0–1	0–1	—

=== Group B ===
Pos	Team	GP	W	L	Qualification	HB	T2K	IHC	BF
1	HomeBois	3	3	0	Qualified for the Decider Match	—	1–0	1–0	1–0
2	Trained to Kill	3	2	1	Eliminated	0–1	—	1–0	1–0
3	IHC Esports	3	1	2	Eliminated	0–1	0–1	—	1–0
4	Brute Force	3	0	3	Eliminated	0–1	0–1	0–1	—

=== Decider match ===
After a 3–0 and a final victory over Nepal's Trained To Kill, HomeBois advances against Group A leaders Entity7 in the Decider Match. After a 1–1 start, HomeBois won two straight games to send E7 home and advance to the Group Stage, 3 games to 1.

Decider Match	30 June	Entity7	1	–	3	HomeBois
	18:00	HomeBois wins the series and advances to the Group Stage 3–1.				
		7	Game 1			16
		12	Game 2			4
		13	Game 3			24
		7	Game 4			15

== Group stage ==
Matches in the group stage are a best-of-two series, with potential best-of-one tiebreakers to be played if necessary. Only the top two teams per group advance to the quarterfinals.

=== Group A ===
Pos	Team	GP	W	D	L	MW	ML	Df	Qualification	NPFL	FF	EVOS	RRQ
1	NIP Flash (Q)	3	2	1	0	5	1	+4	Qualified for the Playoffs	—	2–0	1–1	2–0
2	Fire Flux Esports (Q)	3	2	0	1	4	2	+2	Qualified for the Playoffs	0–2	—	0–2	1–1
3	EVOS Glory (E)	3	0	2	1	2	4	-2	Eliminated	1–1	0–2	—	1–1
4	RRQ Akira (E)	3	0	1	2	1	5	-4	Eliminated	0–2	0–2	1–1	—

(E) Eliminated; (Q) Qualified to the phase indicated

=== Group B ===
Pos	Team	GP	W	D	L	MW	ML	Df	Qualification	SRG	SYS	FNOC	FLCN
1	Selangor Red Giants (Q)	3	0	1	2	5	1	-1	Qualified for the Playoffs	—	2–0^{1}	1–1	2–0
2	SeeYouSoon (Q)	3	2	0	1	4	2	+2	Qualified for the Playoffs	0–2^{1}	—	2–0	2–0
3	Fnatic ONIC (E)	3	1	1	1	3	3	0	Eliminated	1–1	0–2	—	2–0
4	Team Falcons (E)	3	0	0	3	0	6	-6	Eliminated	0–2	0–2	0–2	—

(E) Eliminated; (Q) Qualified to the phase indicated

:1 Due to the Drafting Phase Controversy Investigation, SYS' win has been forfeited and its points were given to SRG.

=== Group C ===
Pos	Team	GP	W	D	L	MW	ML	Df	Qualification	TLPH	HB	TS	TWIS
1	Liquid ECHO (Q)	3	3	0	0	6	0	+6	Qualified for the Playoffs	—	2–0	2–0	2–0
2	HomeBois (Q)	3	2	0	1	4	2	+2	Qualified for the Playoffs	0–2	—	2–0	2–0
3	Team Spirit (E)	3	1	0	2	2	4	-2	Eliminated	0–2	0–2	—	2–0
4	Twisted Minds (E)	3	0	0	3	0	6	-6	Eliminated	0–2	0–2	0–2	—

(E) Eliminated; (Q) Qualified to the phase indicated

=== Group D ===
Pos	Team	GP	W	D	L	MW	ML	Df	Qualification	FCAP	FCON	C9	XYG
1	Falcons AP Bren (Q)	3	3	0	0	6	0	+6	Qualified for the Playoffs	—	2–0	2–0	2–0
2	Falcon Esports (Q)	3	2	0	1	4	2	+2	Qualified for the Playoffs	0–2	—	2–0	2–0
3	Cloud9 (E)	3	0	1	2	1	5	-4	Eliminated	0–2	0–2	—	1–1
4	Xianyou Gaming (E)	3	0	1	2	1	5	-4	Eliminated	0–2	0–2	1–1	—

(E) Eliminated; (Q) Qualified to the phase indicated

== Knockout Stage ==
All matches are a best-of-five series, except for the Grand Final which is a best-of-seven series.

Following the conclusion of Falcons AP Bren and Falcon Esports' match on 7 July, the Knockouts Stage Draw was conducted in the English Livestream.

Quarterfinals (Bo5)
C1	Liquid ECHO	3
D2	Falcon Esports	1
D1	Falcons AP Bren	3
B2	SeeYouSoon	0
B1	Selangor Red Giants	3
A2	Fire Flux Esports	2
A1	NIP Flash	3
C2	HomeBois	2

Semifinals (Bo5)
C1	Liquid ECHO	1
D1	Falcons AP Bren	3
B1	Selangor Red Giants	3
A1	NIP Flash	0

Grand Final (Bo7)
D1	Falcons AP Bren	3
B1	Selangor Red Giants	4

== Quarterfinals ==
=== (C1) Liquid ECHO vs. (D2) Falcon Esports ===
Liquid ECHO started the series strong with both games finishing in under fifteen minutes. With the current patch being introduced to the Mid Season Cup, the utilization of Assassins in the Jungle has been grown significantly. However, after a speculative Akai pick from KarlTzy, Falcon Esports forced the series to four games, winning Game three in under 20 minutes. However, after letting the Chip go and debuting the Natan in the knockouts, Liquid ECHO ended the series and sent Falcon Esports home 3 games to 1. The handover of Falcon Esports’ key was done during the interview with Liquid ECHO's head coach Tictac. The key was overseen by KarlTzy.

Quarterfinals Match No. 1	Liquid ECHO	3 — 1	Falcon Esports	Amazon Arena, Boulevard City
10 July 2024; 16:45 (AST+3)	Liquid ECHO	3 — 1	Falcon Esports	
10 July 2024; 16:45 (AST+3)	Liquid ECHO wins the series, 3–1.			
10 July 2024; 16:45 (AST+3)	Draft	Series	Draft	
10 July 2024; 16:45 (AST+3)	Blue Side: IGN / Role / Ban / Pick; Jaypee / Roam / The Bans were not shown / Chip; KarlTzy / Jungle / The Bans were not shown / Julian; Sanji / Mid / The Bans were not shown / Valentina; Sanford / Exp / The Bans were not shown / Lapu Lapu; Bennyqt / Gold / The Bans were not shown / Moskov; Total Gold / / 60,443; Tortoise Takes / / 3/3; 100%; Lord Takes / / 2/2; 100%; Purple Buffs / / 15; Orange Buffs / / 11; Tower Takes / / 8/9; 89%	1 — 0 Total Game Time: 18:09	Red Side: IGN / Role / Ban / Pick; Dax / Jungle / The Bans were not shown / Chip; Beni / Gold / The Bans were not shown / Julian; Px7 / Mid / The Bans were not shown / Valentina; KidX / Roam / The Bans were not shown / Lapu Lapu; RoyalMilk / Exp / The Bans were not shown / Moskov; Total Gold / / 49,396; Tortoise Takes / / 0/3; 0%; Lord Takes / / 0/2; 0%; Purple Buffs / / 5; Orange Buffs / / 8; Tower Takes / / 1/9; 11%	
10 July 2024; 16:45 (AST+3)	Red Side: IGN / Role / Ban / Pick; Jaypee / Roam / Pharsa / Kaja; KarlTzy / Jungle / Faramis / Akai; Sanji / Mid / Chip / Valentina; Sanford / Exp / Angela / Edith; Bennyqt / Gold / Vexana / Roger; Total Gold / / 48,089; Tortoise Takes / / 3/3; 100%; Lord Takes / / 2/2; 100%; Purple Buffs / / 9; Orange Buffs / / 8; Tower Takes / / 9/9; 100%	2 — 0 Total Game Time: 13:31	Blue Side: IGN / Role / Ban / Pick; Dax / Jungle / Arlott / Ling; Beni / Gold / Minotaur / Harith; Px7 / Mid / Terizla / Aurora; KidX / Roam / Hayabusa / Khufra; RoyalMilk / Exp / Luo Yi / Ruby; Total Gold / / 31,137; Tortoise Takes / / 0/3; 0%; Lord Takes / / 0/2; 0%; Purple Buffs / / 3; Orange Buffs / / 4; Tortoise Takes / / 1/9; 11%	
10 July 2024; 16:45 (AST+3)	Red Side: IGN / Role / Ban / Pick; Jaypee / Roam / Pharsa / Kaja; KarlTzy / Jungle / Faramis / Akai; Sanji / Mid / Chip / Valentina; Sanford / Exp / Angela / Paquito; Bennyqt / Gold / Vexana / Roger; Total Gold / / 51,320; Tortoise Takes / / 2/3; 67%; Lord Takes / / 2/2; 100%; Purple Buffs / / 13; Orange Buffs / / 10; Tower Takes / / 9/9; 100%	2 — 1 Total Game Time: 19:26	Blue Side: IGN / Role / Ban / Pick; Dax / Jungle / Arlott / Ling; Beni / Gold / Ruby / Harith; Px7 / Mid / Edith / Zhask; KidX / Roam / Yu Zhong / Tigreal; RoyalMilk / Exp / Luo Yi / Terizla; Total Gold / / 57,868; Tortoise Takes / / 1/3; 33%; Lord Takes / / 0/2; 0%; Purple Buffs / / 8; Orange Buffs / / 8; Tower Takes / / 6/9; 67%	
10 July 2024; 16:45 (AST+3)	Blue Side: IGN / Role / Ban / Pick; Jaypee / Roam / Terizla / Chip; KarlTzy / Jungle / Faramis / Akai; Sanji / Mid / Ling / Valentina; Sanford / Exp / Angela / Edith; Bennyqt / Gold / Tigreal / Natan; Total Gold / / 40,023; Tortoise Takes / / 3/3 100%; Lord Takes / / 1/1 100%; Purple Buffs / / 9; Orange Buffs / / 8; Tower Takes / / 8/9 89%	3 — 1 Total Game Time: 11:14	Red Side: IGN / Role / Ban / Pick; Dax / Jungle / Arlott / Roger; Beni / Gold / Yu Zhong / Harith; Px7 / Mid / Hayabusa / Aurora; KidX / Roam / Baxia / Minotaur; RoyalMilk / Exp / Luo Yi / Ruby; Total Gold / / 24,885; Tortoise Takes / / 0/3 0%; Lord Takes / / 0/1 0%; Purple Buffs / / 4; Orange Buffs / / 3; Tower Takes / / 0/9 0%	

=== (B1) Selangor Red Giants vs. (A2) Fire Flux Esports ===
Selangor Red Giants came back in Game 1 despite having their backs against the wall with Fire Flux Esports pushing from the top lane. The team used the advantage to turn the game to their favor. Fire Flux would rebound with a fifteen-minute game win for Game 2 but would suffer a 20k gold differential loss that gave SRG match point.

Another Game 4 performance from Selangor Red Giants almost sealed the fate of the Turkish representatives however, after a perfect team fight, Fire Flux forced the Malaysian champions a Game 5. However, the Turkish representatives were overwhelmed with certain picks that made them vulnerable in certain pickoffs and fights. SRG won the quickest game for the match at 12:06. APEX47 handed Fire Flux's key to Selangor Red Giants.

In a separate interview, SRG's head coach Arcadia admitted the overwhelming prowess Fire Flux were able to give them in the best-of-five series—adding on the fact that the team was a new organization in MPL Malaysia whilst Fire Flux has been a name situated into Turkish MLBB dominance.

Quarterfinals Match No. 2	Selangor Red Giants	3 — 2	Fire Flux Esports	Amazon Arena, Boulevard City
10 July 2024; 19:15 (AST+3)	Selangor Red Giants	3 — 2	Fire Flux Esports	
10 July 2024; 19:15 (AST+3)	Selangor Red Giants wins the series, 3–2.			
10 July 2024; 19:15 (AST+3)	Draft	Series	Draft	
10 July 2024; 19:15 (AST+3)	Blue Side: IGN / Role / Ban / Pick; Kramm / Exp / Faramis / Terizla; Sekysss / Jungle / Angela / Ling; Stormie / Mid / Harith / Yve; Yums / Roamer / Floryn / Ruby; Innocent / Gold / Grock / Roger; Total Gold / / 65,903; Tortoise Takes / / 0/2; 0%; Lord Takes / / 2/3; 67%; Purple Buffs / / 12; Orange Buffs / / 10; Tower Takes / / 7/9; 78%	1 — 0 Total Game Time: 22:35	Red Side: IGN / Role / Ban / Pick; Alien / Exp / Chip / Edith; Tienzy / Jungle / Luo Yi / Baxia; Rosa / Mid / Moskov / Valentina; Apex47 / Roamer / Vexana / Kaja; Sunshine / Gold / Chou / Karrie; Total Gold / / 64,244; Tortoise Takes / / 2/2; 100%; Lord Takes / / 1/3; 33%; Purple Buffs / / 11; Orange Buffs / / 9; Tower Takes / / 6/9; 67%	
10 July 2024; 19:15 (AST+3)	Blue Side: IGN / Role / Ban / Pick; Kramm / Exp / Faramis / Cici; Sekysss / Jungle / Angela / Ling; Stormie / Mid / Baxia / Luo Yi; Yums / Roamer / Julian / Ruby; Innocent / Gold / Grock / Bruno; Total Gold / / 41,734; Tortoise Takes / / 2/2; 100%; Lord Takes / / 1/2; 50%; Purple Buffs / / 7; Orange Buffs / / 6; Tower Takes / / 0/9; 0%	1 — 1 Total Game Time: 15:10	Red Side: IGN / Role / Ban / Pick; Alien / Exp / Chip / Arlott; Tienzy / Jungle / Terizla / Aamon; Rosa / Mid / Roger / Valentina; Apex47 / Roamer / Karrie / Tigreal; Sunshine / Gold / Harith / Moskov; Total Gold / / 50,902; Tortoise Takes / / 0/2; 0%; Lord Takes / / 1/2; 50%; Purple Buffs / / 8; Orange Buffs / / 7; Tower Takes / / 7/9; 78%	
10 July 2024; 19:15 (AST+3)	Red Side: IGN / Role / Ban / Pick; Kramm / Exp / Faramis / Lapu Lapu; Sekysss / Jungle / Moskov / Ling; Stormie / Mid / Terizla / Angela; Yums / Roamer / Yu Zhong / Edith; Innocent / Gold / X-Borg / Claude; Total Gold / / 60,005; Tortoise Takes / / 2/2; 100%; Lord Takes / / 3/3; 100%; Purple Buffs / / 13; Orange Buffs / / 12; Tower Takes / / 8/9; 89%	2 — 1 Total Game Time: 18:53	Blue Side: IGN / Role / Ban / Pick; Alien / Exp / Chip / Arlott; Tienzy / Jungle / Valentina / Roger; Rosa / Mid / Baxia / Pharsa; Apex47 / Roamer / Aamon / Floryn; Sunshine / Gold / Julian / Ruby; Total Gold / / 46,319; Tortoise Takes / / 0/2; 0%; Lord Takes / / 0/3; 0%; Purple Buffs / / 8; Orange Buffs / / 7; Tower Takes / / 1/9; 11%	
10 July 2024; 19:15 (AST+3)	Blue Side: IGN / Role / Ban / Pick; Kramm / Exp / Faramis / Ruby; Sekysss / Jungle / Baxia / Nolan; Stormie / Mid / Valentina / Aurora; Yums / Roamer / Alpha / Tigreal; Innocent / Gold / Alice / Roger; Total Gold / / 54,614; Tortoise Takes / / 2/3; 67%; Lord Takes / / 1/3; 33%; Purple Buffs / / 10; Orange Buffs / / 6; Tower Takes / / 7/9; 78%	2 — 2 Total Game Time: 18:44	Red Side: IGN / Role / Ban / Pick; Alien / Exp / Chip / Edith; Tienzy / Jungle / Ling / Julian; Rosa / Mid / Fanny / Angela; Apex47 / Roamer / Terizla / Yu Zhong; Sunshine / Gold / Luo Yi / Moskov; Total Gold / / 58,097; Tortoise Takes / / 1/3; 33%; Lord Takes / / 2/3; 67%; Purple Buffs / / 11; Orange Buffs / / 10; Tower Takes / / 8/9; 89%	
10 July 2024; 19:15 (AST+3)	Red Side: IGN / Role / Ban / Pick; Kramm / Exp / Chip / Floryn; Sekysss / Jungle / Valentina / Roger; Stormie / Mid / Moskov / Lylia; Yums / Roamer / Claude / Ruby; Innocent / Gold / Luo Yi / Harith; Total Gold / / 40,210; Tortoise Takes / / 3/3; 100%; Lord Takes / / 1/1; 100%; Purple Buffs / / 6; Orange Buffs / / 6; Tower Takes / / 9/9; 100%	3 — 2 Total Game Time: 12:06	Blue Side: IGN / Role / Ban / Pick; Alien / Exp / Edith / Yu Zhong; Tienzy / Jungle / Ling / Julian; Rosa / Mid / Fanny / Angela; Apex47 / Roamer / Faramis / Grock; Sunshine / Gold / Tigreal / Karrie; Total Gold / / 30,634; Tortoise Takes / / 0/3; 0%; Lord Takes / / 0/1; 0%; Purple Buffs / / 6; Orange Buffs / / 6; Tower Takes / / 2/9; 22%	

=== (D1) Falcons AP Bren vs. (B2) SeeYouSoon ===
Determined to become the only remaining undefeated team in the Group Stage and the Knockout brackets, Falcons AP Bren made quick works against Cambodian champions SeeYouSoon, ending Games 1 and 2 by under fifteen minutes and with great gold-differentials. This was also shown as Falcons AP Bren have been consistent in both contesting and winning objectives on the map including the Lord and the Turtle.

Many have predicted that Falcons AP Bren would falter in Game 3 after being too-complacent in certain team fights that enabled SeeYouSoon's Jungler MP the King on the Roger to deal immense damage. This included a Triple Kill on the mid lane that let the team break an inhibitor in the middle and bottom lane. However, following a neutralization effort by Owgwen that pushed Roger to the main base, Falcons AP Bren turned the tides to their favor and ended the game with the first and only sweep in the Knockout Bracket.

Falcons AP Bren and Liquid ECHO would meet in the Semifinals and will qualify the Philippines to the Grand Finals for the fourth-consecutive iteration of the Mid Season Cup.

Quarterfinals Match No. 3	Falcons AP Bren	3 — 0	SeeYouSoon	Amazon Arena, Boulevard City
11 July 2024; 16:00 (AST+3)	Falcons AP Bren	3 — 0	SeeYouSoon	
11 July 2024; 16:00 (AST+3)	Falcons AP Bren wins the series, 3–0			
11 July 2024; 16:00 (AST+3)	Draft	Series	Draft	
11 July 2024; 16:00 (AST+3)	Blue Side: IGN / Role / Ban / Pick; FlapTzy / Exp / Faramis / Arlott; KyleTzy / Jungle / Valentina / Julian; Phewww / Mid / Angela / Lylia; Owgwen / Roamer / Kaja / Minotaur; Super Marco / Gold / Bane / Roger; Total Gold / / 43,708; Tortoise Takes / / 3/3 100%; Lord Takes / / 1/1 100%; Purple Buffs / / 8; Orange Buffs / / 6; Tower Takes / / 8/9 89%	1 — 0 Total Game Time: 12:38	Red Side: IGN / Role / Ban / Pick; MP the King / Jungle / Luo Yi / Terizla; Souuul / Gold / Chip / Hayabusa; Raa / Mid / Ling / Vexana; BOXI / Roam / Yu Zhong / Tigreal; Felix / Exp / Uranus / Karrie; Total Gold / / 31,990; Tortoise Takes / / 0/3 0%; Lord Takes / / 0/1 0%; Purple Buffs / / 5; Orange Buffs / / 6; Tower Takes / / 1/9 11%	
11 July 2024; 16:00 (AST+3)	Red Side: IGN / Role / Ban / Pick; FlapTzy / Jungle / Chip / Terizla; KyleTzy / Gold / Ling / Hayabusa; Phewww / Mid / Roger / Yve; Owgwen / Roam / Kaja / Lolita; Super Marco / Exp / Chou / Harith; Total Gold / / 38,740; Tortoise Takes / / 2/3 67%; Lord Takes / / 1/1 100%; Purple Buffs / / 9; Orange Buffs / / 6; Tower Takes / / 8/9 89%	2 — 0 Total Game Time: 11:25	Blue Side: IGN / Role / Ban / Pick; MP the King / Exp / Luo Yi / Yu Zhong; Souuul / Jungle / Moskov / Bane; Raa / Mid / Arlott / Valentina; BOXI / Roamer / Tigreal / Edith; Felix / Gold / Grock / Karrie; Total Gold / / 29,338; Tortoise Takes / / 1/3 33%; Lord Takes / / 0/1 0%; Purple Buffs / / 4; Orange Buffs / / 5; Tower Takes / / 1/9 11%	
11 July 2024; 16:00 (AST+3)	Blue Side: IGN / Role / Ban / Pick; FlapTzy / Exp / Faramis / Terizla; KyleTzy / Jungle / Valentina / Ling; Phewww / Mid / Kaja / Vexana; Owgwen / Roamer / Claude / Tigreal; Super Marco / Gold / Yu Zhong / Harith; Total Gold / / 55,748; Tortoise Takes / / 2/3 67%; Lord Takes / / 1/2 50%; Purple Buffs / / 10; Orange Buffs / / 6; Tower Takes / / 8/9 89%	3 — 0 Total Game Time: 16:41	Red Side: IGN / Role / Ban / Pick; MP the King / Jungle / Chip / Roger; Souuul / Gold / Minotaur / Natan; Raa / Mid / Moskov / Angela; BOXI / Roam / Yve / Chou; Felix / Exp / Luo Yi / Arlott; Total Gold / / 55,035; Tortoise Takes / / 1/3 33%; Lord Takes / / 1/2 50%; Purple Buffs / / 8; Orange Buffs / / 8; Tower Takes / / 8/9 89%	

=== (A1) NIP Flash vs. (C2) HomeBois ===
An All-Star studded lineup was played for the Singaporean champions of NIP Flash which included the services of Hadess and KurtTzy from Geek Fam (on a loan) and formerly ECHO Proud, respectively. They matched up against the former Malaysian champions HomeBois whom crawled their way into the knockout brackets from the Wild Card.

Game 1 had back-and-forth altercations for both teams with either NIP Flash or HomeBois taking massive advantages in team fights and neutral objective takes. However, HomeBois took the Game in just under fifteen minutes with a substantial neutral and objective percentages.

Game 2 was similar with Game 1 however; it was NIP Flash who unleashed its wrath by revealing a classic Martis-mid lane match up against Udil's Vexana. Martis has been used by many Singaporean players in the Mid Lane as a potential physical counter to the mid lane of the opposing team. This investment paid off massively as the team ended the game in 13:35 to tie the series 1-1.

Game 3 was by far the longest game of this series, lasting for 23 minutes with either team having the ability to take the game. However, HomeBois were able to close the game out after three-of-four successful Lord takes and nearly an equal number of turrets being destroyed to take match point.

Games 4 and 5 however had the same tale of faith for HomeBois as not only NIP Flash equalized in a dominant Game 4 that saw Martis returning in the mid lane, but closing the series in an unprecedented 3 games 2 over the overwhelming favorites of the match. This was because of the lasting performance of Diablo on the Benedetta that overwhelmed Sepat.

Following their early exit in MSC 2024, HomeBois' head coach Khairul Azman "Pabz" Sharif resigned and departed from the team, taking the responsibilities and shortcomings that HomeBois has experienced during MSC 2024.

Quarterfinals Match No. 4	NIP Flash	3 — 2	HomeBois	Amazon Arena, Boulevard City
11 July 2024; 19:00 (AST+3)	NIP Flash	3 — 2	HomeBois	
11 July 2024; 19:00 (AST+3)	NIP Flash wins the series, 3–2.			
11 July 2024; 19:00 (AST+3)	Draft	Series	Draft	
11 July 2024; 19:00 (AST+3)	Blue Side: IGN / Role / Ban / Pick; Diablo / Exp / Ling / Arlott; Hadess / Jungle / Angela / Nolan; KurtTzy / Mid / Valentina / Pharsa; JPL / Roamer / Vexana / Kaja; Vanix / Gold / Faramis / Harith; Total Gold / / 44,902; Tortoise Takes / / 1/3 33%; Lord Takes / / 0/2 0%; Purple Buffs / / 10; Orange Buffs / / 5; Tower Takes / / 3/9 33%	0 — 1 Total Game Time: 14:55	Red Side: IGN / Role / Ban / Pick; Sepat / Exp / Moskov / Ruby; Chibi / Jungle / Luo Yi / Hayabusa; Udil / Mid / Chip / Xavier; Xorn / Roamer / Edith / Grock; Nets / Gold / Baxia / Roger; Total Gold / / 49,672; Tortoise Takes / / 2/3 67%; Lord Takes / / 2/2 100%; Purple Buffs / / 6; Orange Buffs / / 9; Tower Takes / / 9/9 100%	
11 July 2024; 19:00 (AST+3)	Blue Side: IGN / Role / Ban / Pick; Diablo / Exp / Angela / Ruby; Hadess / Jungle / Ling / Julian; KurtTzy / Mid / Valentina / Martis; JPL / Roamer / Edith / Chou; Vanix / Gold / Kaja / Harith; Total Gold / / 46,295; Tortoise Takes / / 2/3 67%; Lord Takes / / 2/2 100%; Purple Buffs / / 10; Orange Buffs / / 8; Tower Takes / / 8/9 89%	1 — 1 Total Game Time: 13:35	Red Side: IGN / Role / Ban / Pick; Sepat / Exp / Chip / Terizla; Chibi / Jungle / Luo Yi / Hayabusa; Udil / Mid / Chip / Vexana; Nets / Roamer / Faramis / Arlott; Xorn / Gold / Nana / Roger; Total Gold / / 34,626; Tortoise Takes / / 1/3 33%; Lord Takes / / 0/2 0%; Purple Buffs / / 6; Orange Buffs / / 6; Tower Takes / / 0/9 0%	
11 July 2024; 19:00 (AST+3)	Red Side: IGN / Role / Ban / Pick; Diablo / Exp / Angela / Ruby; Hadess / Jungle / Chip / Hayabusa; KurtTzy / Mid / Ling / Pharsa; JPL / Roamer / Faramis / Tigreal; Vanix / Gold / Vexana / Roger; Total Gold / / 70,799; Tortoise Takes / / 1/3 33%; Lord Takes / / 1/4 25%; Purple Buffs / / 10; Orange Buffs / / 11; Tower Takes / / 8/9 89%	1 — 2 Total Game Time: 23:23	Blue Side: IGN / Role / Ban / Pick; Sepat / Exp / Luo Yi / Barats; Chibi / Jungle / Moskov / Nolan; Udil / Mid / Valentina / Xavier; Nets / Roamer / Grock / Chou; Xorn / Gold / Kaja / Harith; Total Gold / / 73,482; Tortoise Takes / / 2/3 67%; Lord Takes / / 3/4 75%; Purple Buffs / / 8; Orange Buffs / / 15; Tower Takes / / 8/9 89%	
11 July 2024; 19:00 (AST+3)	Blue Side: IGN / Role / Ban / Pick; Diablo / Exp / Angela / Benedetta; Hadess / Jungle / Ling / Guinevere; KurtTzy / Mid / Valentina / Martis; JPL / Roamer / Minsitthar / Grock; Vanix / Gold / Did not shown / Harith; Total Gold / / 49,370; Tortoise Takes / / 3/3 100%; Lord Takes / / 2/2 100%; Purple Buffs / / 9; Orange Buffs / / 8; Tower Takes / / 8/9 89%	2 — 2 Total Game Time: 13:56	Red Side: IGN / Role / Ban / Pick; Sepat / Exp / Moskov / Ruby; Chibi / Jungle / Luo Yi / Roger; Udil / Mid / Chip / Xavier; Nets / Roamer / Hayabusa / Chou; Xorn / Gold / Did not shown / Claude; Total Gold / / 36,655; Tortoise Takes / / 0/3 0%; Lord Takes / / 0/2 0%; Purple Buffs / / 5; Orange Buffs / / 4; Tower Takes / / 0/9 0%	
11 July 2024; 19:00 (AST+3)	Red Side: IGN / Role / Ban / Pick; Diablo / Exp / Angela / Benedetta; Hadess / Jungle / Chip / Barats; KurtTzy / Mid / Harith / Valentina; JPL / Roamer / Minsitthar / Chou; Vanix / Gold / Karrie / Roger; Total Gold / / 47,716; Tortoise Takes / / 0/3 0%; Lord Takes / / 1/2 50%; Purple Buffs / / 7; Orange Buffs / / 8; Tower Takes / / 4/9 44%	3 — 2 Total Game Time: 16:11	Blue Side: IGN / Role / Ban / Pick; Sepat / Exp / Moskov / Arlott; Chibi / Jungle / Luo Yi / Ling; Udil / Mid / Martis / Pharsa; Nets / Roamer / Hayabusa / Jawhead; Xorn / Gold / Fredrinn / Claude; Total Gold / / 52,286; Tortoise Takes / / 3/3 100%; Lord Takes / / 1/2 50%; Purple Buffs / / 8; Orange Buffs / / 7; Tower Takes / / 8/9 89%	

== Semifinals ==
=== (C1) Liquid ECHO vs. (D1) Falcons AP Bren ===
Both Liquid ECHO and Falcons AP Bren advances to the semifinals as both Philippine-representatives are poised to take a Grand Finals spot for MSC 2024. This will be the third-consecutive iteration of the Mid Season Cup that the Philippines will not have two representatives in the Grand Finals. Moreover, the first series of the Semifinals will showcase a rematch of the MPL Philippines Season 13 Grand Finals where Liquid ECHO swept Falcons AP Bren.

Game 1 was a back and forth scenario for both teams as the defending MPL and World champions battle it out for their one and only trophy left to complete their cabinet of trophies. During the post-game analysis, Caisam “Wolf” Nopueto pointed out that Pheww exposed Sanford's positioning to the team during that skirmish by targeting him in the Mid-Lane as he attempted to reach the Lord side through the middle's left bush (Facing FCAP's base). As Super Marco was already attacking the Lord, Falcons AP Bren took advantage of a possible map misplay by Jaypee by trying to setup a play and challenge the Lord with the "Lord Dance" tactic, but Jaypee retreated and KarlTzy was boxed by three members of FCAP—denying him intervention. Liquid ECHO was compelled by this to respond to Sanji's ultimate, which exposed FCAP's stances. After then, FlapTzy took advantage of the situation and fined two members of Liquid ECHO, winning the Lord and the match for FCAP.

Returning to a semi-utility Jungler lineups for both teams, both teams have been playing hot potato with their leads and advantages 10 minutes into the game—extending the possible leads and time both teams could have in order to take crucial objectives. However, during the fifteenth minute in contesting the first Lord of the match, Sanford was melted down in a five-on-five skirmish to take on and contest the Lord whom had 11,000 health remaining. The Lord was reset until Sanji was picked off by the Penalty Zone by FlapTzy that gave FCAP a 5-to-3-man advantage that gave them the first Lord in the series. Moreover, their split push maneuvers on all lanes of the map pushed Liquid ECHO to the brink as they lose all of the turrets including their inhibitors. However, during the final minutes of the game, KarlTzy was able to steal the Lord take that forced Liquid ECHO to make a hard retreat that picked off two of their crucial members including Bennyqt—the primary damage dealers to Liquid ECHO. FCAP took it to match point and capitalized on this contest.

Semifinals Match No. 1	Liquid ECHO	1 — 3	Falcons AP Bren	Amazon Arena, Boulevard City
12 July 2024; 19:45 (AST+3)	Liquid ECHO	1 — 3	Falcons AP Bren	
12 July 2024; 19:45 (AST+3)	Falcons AP Bren wins the series, 3–1.			
12 July 2024; 19:45 (AST+3)	Draft	Series	Draft	
12 July 2024; 19:45 (AST+3)	Red Side: IGN / Role / Ban / Pick; Sanford / Exp / Chip / Paquito; KarlTzy / Jungle / Harith / Akai; Sanji / Mid / Luo Yi / Pharsa; Jaypee / Roamer / Angela / Edith; Bennyqt / Gold / Faramis / Moskov; Total Gold / / 43,313; Tortoise Takes / / 2/3 67%; Lord Takes / / 0/1 0%; Purple Buffs / / 6; Orange Buffs / / 7; Tower Takes / / 3/9 33%	0 — 1 Total Game Time: 15:32	Blue Side: IGN / Role / Ban / Pick; FlapTzy / Exp / Valentina / Terizla; KyleTzy / Jungle / Baxia / Ling; Phewww / Mid / Arlott / Julian; Owgwen / Roamer / Kaja / Minotaur; Super Marco / Gold / Yu Zhong / Roger; Total Gold / / 49,764; Tortoise Takes / / 1/3 33%; Lord Takes / / 1/1 100%; Purple Buffs / / 11; Orange Buffs / / 8; Tower Takes / / 7/9 78%	
12 July 2024; 19:45 (AST+3)	Blue Side: IGN / Role / Ban / Pick; Sanford / Exp / Ling / Arlott; KarlTzy / Jungle / Faramis / Baxia; Sanji / Mid / Harith / Luo Yi; Jaypee / Roamer / Hayabusa / Minotaur; Bennyqt / Gold / Tigreal / Karrie; Total Gold / / 50,134; Tortoise Takes / / 2/3 67%; Lord Takes / / 1/2 50%; Purple Buffs / / 9; Orange Buffs / / 9; Tower Takes / / 1/9 11%	0 — 2 Total Game Time: 19:11	Red Side: IGN / Role / Ban / Pick; KyleTzy / Jungle / Valentina / Julian; Super Marco / Gold / Kaja / Moskov; Phewww / Mid / Roger / Lylia; Owgwen / Roam / Yu Zhong / Lolita; FlapTzy / Exp / Chip / FlapTzy; Total Gold / / 55,759; Tortoise Takes / / 1/3 33%; Lord Takes / / 1/2 50%; Purple Buffs / / 11; Orange Buffs / / 10; Tower Takes / / 9/9 100%	
12 July 2024; 19:45 (AST+3)	Blue Side: IGN / Role / Ban / Pick; Sanford / Exp / Ling / Yu Zhong; KarlTzy / Jungle / Terizla / Baxia; Sanji / Mid / Harith / Luo Yi; Jaypee / Roamer / Lolita / Minotaur; Bennyqt / Gold / Lylia / Natan; Total Gold / / 54,245; Tortoise Takes / / 2/3 67%; Lord Takes / / 3/3 100%; Purple Buffs / / 12; Orange Buffs / / 10; Tower Takes / / 7/9 78%	1 — 2 Total Game Time: 17:02	Red Side: IGN / Role / Ban / Pick; KyleTzy / Jungle / Chip / Nolan; Super Marco / Gold / Valentina / Claude; Phewww / Mid / Roger / Julian; Owgwen / Roam / Kaja / Arlott; FlapTzy / Exp / Moskov / Edith; Total Gold / / 44,838; Tortoise Takes / / 1/3 33%; Lord Takes / / 0/3 0%; Purple Buffs / / 6; Orange Buffs / / 7; Tower Takes / / 4/9 44%	
12 July 2024; 19:45 (AST+3)	Red Side: IGN / Role / Ban / Pick; Sanford / Exp / Chip / Terizla; KarlTzy / Jungle / Ling / Akai; Sanji / Mid / Harith / Pharsa; Jaypee / Roamer / Lylia / Mathilda; Bennyqt / Gold / Hayabusa / Natan; Total Gold / / 26,415; Tortoise Takes / / 0/2 0%; Lord Takes / / 0/1 0%; Purple Buffs / / 3; Orange Buffs / / 3; Tower Takes / / 0/9 0%	1 — 3 Total Game Time: 10:33	Blue Side: IGN / Role / Ban / Pick; FlapTzy / Exp / Valentina / Arlott; KyleTzy / Jungle / Baxia / Julian; Phewww / Mid / Luo Yi / Faramis; Owgwen / Roamer / Kaja / Minotaur; Super Marco / Gold / Floryn / Roger; Total Gold / / 37,179; Tortoise Takes / / 2/2 100%; Lord Takes / / 1/1 100%; Purple Buffs / / 7; Orange Buffs / / 6; Tower Takes / / 8/9 89%	

=== (B1) Selangor Red Giants vs. (A1) NIP Flash ===
Selangor Red Giants remained a dominant force against NIP Flash, sweeping the Singaporean champions out of MSC 2024. In Game 1 alone, NIP Flash had the advantage to take the game but due to a miscommunicated error in a team fight, Selangor Red Giants to the victory that ultimately led to continuous victories for the team—extending their undefeated streak for above one hundred days. Selangor Red Giants are now poised to face Falcons AP Bren in the Finals for the first time. The knockout stage for MSC 2024 is the first for Malaysia to appear in the Grand Finals in any international tournament.

Semifinals Match No. 2	Selangor Red Giants	3 — 0	NIP Flash	Amazon Arena, Boulevard City
12 July 2024; 19:45 (AST+3)	Selangor Red Giants	3 — 0	NIP Flash	
12 July 2024; 19:45 (AST+3)	Selangor Red Giants wins the series, 3–0			
12 July 2024; 19:45 (AST+3)	Draft	Series	Draft	
12 July 2024; 19:45 (AST+3)	Blue Side: IGN / Role / Ban / Pick; Kramm / Exp / Benedetta / Dyrotth; Sekysss / Jungle / Luo Yi / Ling; Stormie / Mid / Valentina / Phoveus; Yums / Roamer / Guinevere / Ruby; Innocent / Gold / Minsitthar / Moskov; Total Gold / / 48,953; Tortoise Takes / / 1/3 33%; Lord Takes / / 0/2 0%; Purple Buffs / / 7; Orange Buffs / / 6; Tower Takes / / 8/9 89%	1 — 0 Total Game Time: 14:37	Red Side: IGN / Role / Ban / Pick; Diablo / Exp / Aurora / Uranus; Hades / Jungle / Faramis / Aamon; KurtTzy / Mid / Roger / Martis; JPL / Roamer / Angela / Chou; Vanix / Gold / Chip / Harith; Total Gold / / 41,446; Tortoise Takes / / 2/3 67%; Lord Takes / / 2/2 100%; Purple Buffs / / 9; Orange Buffs / / 8; Tower Takes / / 2/9 22%	
12 July 2024; 19:45 (AST+3)	Red Side: IGN / Role / Ban / Pick; Kramm / Exp / Chip / Benedetta; Sekysss / Jungle / Moskov / Alpha; Stormie / Mid / Roger / Luo Yi; Yums / Roamer / Guinevere / Grock; Innocent / Gold / Baxia / Bruno; Total Gold / / 36,049; Tortoise Takes / / 0/2 0%; Lord Takes / / 0/1 0%; Purple Buffs / / 5; Orange Buffs / / 5; Tower Takes / / 1/9 11%	2 — 0 Total Game Time: 12:43	Blue Side: IGN / Role / Ban / Pick; Diablo / Exp / Aurora / Yu Zhong; Hades / Jungle / Lylia / Ling; KurtTzy / Mid / Harith / Novaria; JPL / Roamer / Valentina / Ruby; Vanix / Gold / Angela / Claude; Total Gold / / 43,387; Tortoise Takes / / 2/2 100%; Lord Takes / / 1/1 100%; Purple Buffs / / 9; Orange Buffs / / 7; Tower Takes / / 8/9 89%	
12 July 2024; 19:45 (AST+3)	Red Side: IGN / Role / Ban / Pick; Kramm / Exp / Chip / Arlott; Sekysss / Jungle / Moskov / Fanny; Stormie / Mid / Martis / Valentina; Yums / Roamer / Badang / Minotaur; Innocent / Gold / Minsitthar / Harith; Total Gold / / 40,093; Tortoise Takes / / 0/3 0%; Lord Takes / / 1/1 100%; Purple Buffs / / 10; Orange Buffs / / 5; Tower Takes / / 7/9 78%	3 — 0 Total Game Time: 13:29	Blue Side: IGN / Role / Ban / Pick; Diablo / Exp / Ruby / Khalid; Hades / Jungle / Ling / Baxia; KurtTzy / Mid / Angela / Pharsa; JPL / Roamer / Terizla / Chou; Vanix / Gold / Grock / Roger; Total Gold / / 36,226; Tortoise Takes / / 3/3 100%; Lord Takes / / 0/1 0%; Purple Buffs / / 5; Orange Buffs / / 6; Tower Takes / / 1/9 11%	

== Grand Finals ==
=== (D1) Falcons AP Bren vs. (B1) Selangor Red Giants ===
The Grand Finals match between Falcons AP Bren and Selangor Red Giants is significant as it is the first time both teams will face each other in any international tournament and the first time that Malaysia has ever qualified for the Grand Finals in any international tournament. Moreover, this series of the Grand Finals features the most Filipinos competing in both teams with Selangor Red Giants having two Filipino imports in Innocent and Kramm. Falcons AP Bren are the defending world champions and the runners-up for MPL Philippines Season 13 meanwhile Selangor Red Giants are the defending Malaysian champions, defeating HomeBois in the Grand Finals in six games.

In Game 1, the draft for both sides were staggering in its own perspectives with Falcons AP Bren focusing on a crowd control composition whilst Selangor Red Giants choosing a proactive approach in its composition with little-to-no bush checking heroes. An early double-kill to Kramm and Sekysss, Falcons AP Bren had an early 1,000-gold lead. A failed attempt to steal the first turtle from the side of SRG widened the lead of FCAP by nearly 2,000-gold in just three minutes into the game. This skirmish was particularly at a disadvantage for SRG due to the pickoff for Sekysss who started the early game 0/2/0. Moreover, Sekysss was two-levels behind of KyleTzy upon the second turtle spawn. The "Minoans Fury" Set from Owgwen picked off yet again two members in the turtle contest from SRG and another kill on the bottom lane. However, SRG had gained the momentum despite their early game blunders. SRG even pushed FCAP to its first inhibitor down in the bottom lane. However, with a massive split-push coming in from Pheww in a potential "Lord Dance", FCAP takes Game 1.

Game 2 had a similar story. Falcons AP Bren were able to overwhelm a five-man wipeout in the mid-lane coming into 10 minutes into the game. However, SRG remained poised to contest certain objectives such as a tower take. This prevented FCAP from pushing any further and aggressively controlling the mid-lane. However, 13 minutes into the Game, SRG were able to pressure FCAP and pushed in on all sides with a Lord take. This sent shockwaves around the venue as SRG pushed the first inhibitor on the top lane and the mid-lane. Despite the efforts of defending the base, Sekysss and Kramm were able to equalize the series 1–1.

The Grand Finals equalized to 2 games a piece as SRG pushed FCAP to its limits in Games 4 and 5. In the pivotal Game 6, certain picks for certain players in both squads had held comfort heroes that may or may not be of help to their advantage. A massive Game 6 advantage ten minutes into the game pushed SRG's top lane to its limit in the inhibitor turret with Super Marco launching certain pushes that gave FCAP the favor of both team fights and map control. However, their overwhelming presence on the map pushed the Grand Finals series to Game 7—the first Game-seven match in MSC History.

Game 7 was one for the history books as even in the early game, neither team had the advantage against each other—playing equally to their strengths and weaknesses. A Fighter vs. Assassin Jungler matchup was picked up in the draft with KyleTzy playing his signature Ling while Sekysss utilized Alpha. As it neared the transition from the early to the mid game, SRG had a slight advantage of 2,000 gold and with both level 1 turrets going down for FCAP in the mid-lane and side lane. SRG was controlling both the damage per hero and the momentum of the game. It seemed that FCAP did not capitalize on its ability to maintain the momentum of the game in any part of the series, inhibiting pressure from SRG's dominance as they lose an inhibitor turret on the bottom lane on the eleventh minute mark. Moreover, a pick off from Owgwen from the second Lord take made it all but impossible for FCAP to redeem from the mistake. After holding the mid-lane in a potential game-ending push from Kramm and Stormie, FCAP managed to hold on and wait it out for the third Lord take.

Selangor Red Giants continues their win streak as they become the champions of MSC 2024, denying another trophy for the Philippines for the second year in a row for the international tournament. MSC 2024 is the first major tournament that Malaysia has won in any series of Moonton's events which includes the World Championships.

Grand Finals Match	Falcons AP Bren	3 — 4	Selangor Red Giants	Amazon Arena, Boulevard City
14 July 2024 15:00 (AST+3)	Falcons AP Bren	3 — 4	Selangor Red Giants	
14 July 2024 15:00 (AST+3)	Selangor Red Giants are your MSC 2024 Champions winning the series, 4–3.			

== Final standings ==
Final standings, Esports Club Championship points distribution, and prizepool of US$3,000,000 distribution are as seen as below:

The Best Performance by every participating nation in MSC 2024. Champions Runner Up Semifinals Quarterfinals Group Stage Wildcard Stage

Team Name	Short Name	Region	Wild Card		Group Stage	Knockout Bracket			Final Placement	EWC Points	Prize Pool
Team Name	Short Name	Region	WCG	DM	Group Stage	QF	SF	GF	Final Placement	EWC Points	Prize Pool
Selangor Red Giants	SRG	MPL–MY	Qualified to the Group Stage		2–1–0	3–2	3–0	4–3	Champions	1000	$1,000,000
Falcons AP Bren	FCAP	MPL–PH	Qualified to the Group Stage		3–0–0	3–0	3–1	3–4	Runner Up	600	$500,000
NIP Flash	NPFL	MPL–SG	Qualified to the Group Stage		2–0–1	3–2	0–3	Eliminated	Top 3–4	275	$200,000
Liquid ECHO	TLPH	MPL–PH	Qualified to the Group Stage		3–0–0	3–1	1–3	Eliminated	Top 3–4	275	$200,000
HomeBois	HB	MPL–MY	3–0	3–1	2–0–1	2–3	Eliminated		Top 5–8	60	$100,000
SeeYouSoon	SYS	MPL–KH	Qualified to the Group Stage		2–0–1	0–3	Eliminated		Top 5–8	60	$100,000
Fire Flux Esports	FF	MTC	Qualified to the Group Stage		2–0–1	2–3	Eliminated		Top 5–8	60	$100,000
Falcon Esports	FCON	MSC–MMQ.	Qualified to the Group Stage		2–0–1	1–3	Eliminated		Top 5–8	60	$100,000
Fnatic ONIC	FNOC	MPL–ID	Qualified to the Group Stage		1–1–1	Eliminated			Top 9–16	0	$56,000
EVOS Glory	EVOS	MPL–ID	Qualified to the Group Stage		0–2–1	Eliminated			Top 9–16	0	$56,000
Team Falcons	FLCN	MPL–MENA	Qualified to the Group Stage		0–0–3	Eliminated			Top 9–16	0	$56,000
Twisted Minds	TWIS	MPL–MENA	Qualified to the Group Stage		0–0–3	Eliminated			Top 9–16	0	$56,000
RRQ Akira	RRQ	MPL–LATAM	Qualified to the Group Stage		0–1–2	Eliminated			Top 9–16	0	$56,000
Team Spirit	TS	MCC	Qualified to the Group Stage		1–0–2	Eliminated			Top 9–16	0	$56,000
Cloud9	C9	NACT	Qualified to the Group Stage		0–1–2	Eliminated			Top 9–16	0	$56,000
Xianyou Gaming	XYG	MSC–CHQ.	Qualified to the Group Stage		0–1–2	Eliminated			Top 9–16	0	$56,000
Entity7	E7	MPL–LATAM	3–0	1–3	Eliminated				Top 17–23	0	$36,000
Brute Force	BF	MCC	0–3	Eliminated					Top 17–23	0	$36,000
S2G Esports	S2G	MTC	0–3	Eliminated					Top 17–23	0	$36,000
KeepBest Gaming	KBG	MSC–CHQ.	1–2	Eliminated					Top 17–23	0	$36,000
Trained to Kill	T2K	MCB	2–1	Eliminated					Top 17–23	0	$36,000
Zino Zenith	ZEN	MCC–M	2–1	Eliminated					Top 17–23	0	$36,000
IHC Esports	IHC	MSC–MNQ.	1–2	Eliminated					Top 17–23	0	$36,000

== Controversies ==
=== Draft Phase Controversy ===
On 3 July, the match between Cambodia's SeeYouSoon and Malaysia's Selangor Red Giants underwent heavy scrutiny from the side of SRG due to several reasons targeting SeeYouSoon. These problems includes an alleged bug during the drafting phase, and an immediate surrender during the start of the game without the consent and approval of the Marshall responsible for this game. The public allegedly had called SYS out for trying to beat SRG in this unconventional manner due to SRG's known dominance in MPL Malaysia. Many have predicted that their actions during this match were subjected to severe penalization and disciplinary actions.

On 4 July, the MSC Committee has launched its investigation regarding SeeYouSoon's claims of an in-game bug that prevented them from picking their desired hero and their misconduct for surrendering rather than asking for a redraft or a rematch. A day later, the MSC Committee has announced that SeeYouSoon has violated two Penalties in accordance with the MSC 2024 Rule Book. The following results were concluded:

- SeeYouSoon did not notify the Marshall of a rematch or redraft for the Game against Selangor Red Giants and surrendered in-game without the awareness of the Marshall.
- SeeYouSoon did commit match misconduct and have automatically forfeited the match with the points going to Selangor Red Giants.
- SeeYouSoon's Coaching Staff Sam "Paragon" Sophanny and Chhim "CatGod" Vitou will have a 4-match suspension for MSC 2024. They are not allowed to be present in the venue during the remaining matches of SeeYouSoon in the tournament.
