= Esports at the 2019 SEA Games – Mobile Legends tournament =

Esports event at the Southeast Asian Games

Mobile Legends at the 2019 Southeast Asian Games
- Venue: Filoil Flying V Centre
- Dates: 5 – 8 December
- Nations: 9

Medalists
gold medal	PHI	Philippines
silver medal	INA	Indonesia
bronze medal	MAS	Malaysia

The Mobile Legends: Bang Bang tournament for the 2019 Southeast Asian Games were held on December 5 to 8 at the Filoil Flying V Centre in San Juan, Metro Manila.

The tournament consisted of a group stage and a two-bracket playoff round.

The Philippines clinched the gold medal, winning over Indonesia in the grand finals.

== Participating teams ==
Nine teams from nine nations participated at the Mobile Legends: Bang Bang tournament of the 2019 Southeast Asian Games.

- Cambodia (CAM)
- Indonesia (INA)
- Laos (LAO)
- Malaysia (MAS)
- Myanmar (MYA)
- Philippines (PHI)
- Singapore (SGP)
- Thailand (THA)
- Vietnam (VIE)

== Results ==
=== Group stage ===
==== Group A ====
Pos	Team	W	D	L	GW	GL	GD	Pts	Qualification
1	Malaysia	2	2	0	6	2	+4	8	Upper Bracket Finals
2	Vietnam (Note: Singapore 0–1 Vietnam)	1	3	0	5	3	+2	6	Lower Bracket Semifinals
3	Singapore	1	3	0	5	3	+2	6	
4	Myanmar	1	2	1	4	4	0	5	
5	Cambodia	0	0	4	0	8	-8	0	

Source:One Esport

==== Group B ====
Pos	Team	W	D	L	GW	GL	GD	Pts	Qualification
1	Indonesia	2	1	0	5	1	+4	7	Upper Bracket Finals
2	Philippines	1	2	0	4	2	+2	5	Lower Bracket Semifinals
3	Thailand	1	1	1	3	3	0	4	
4	Laos	0	0	3	0	6	-6	0	

Source:One Esport

=== Final round ===
All playoff games including the Bronze Medal Match were a Bo3 series, except for the Gold Medal Match were a Bo5 series.

Upper Bracket Final	Gold Medal Match
B1	Indonesia	2
A1	Malaysia	0
B1	Indonesia	2
B2	Philippines	3
Lower Bracket Semifinal	Bronze Medal Match
A1	Malaysia	0
A2	Vietnam	0	B2	Philippines	2
B2	Philippines	2

==== Lower Bracket ====
Semifinals

Date		Score		Game 1	Game 2	Game 3	Report
6 December	Philippines	2–0	Vietnam	PHI	PHI	-	Report

Finals – Bronze medal

Date		Score		Game 1	Game 2	Game 3	Report
8 December	Philippines	2–0	Malaysia	PHI	PHI	-	Report

==== Upper Bracket ====
Finals

Date		Score		Game 1	Game 2	Game 3	Report
6 December	Malaysia	0–2	Indonesia	INA	INA	-	Report

==== Gold medal ====
Date		Score		Game 1	Game 2	Game 3	Game 4	Game 5	Report
8 December	Indonesia	2–3	Philippines	PHI	INA	INA	PHI	PHI	
