= AP Bren =

Professional Esports organization based in the Philippines

Aces Pro Bren Esports
- Short name: AP.Bren
- Divisions: Mobile Legends: Bang Bang; Hearthstone; Clash Royale; Overwatch; Arena of Valor; League of Legends; Counter Strike: Global Offensive; PUBG; Tekken 7 Rules of Survival; Valorant
- Founded: 16 August 2017; 9 years ago
- Based in: Makati, Metro Manila, Philippines
- Location: Southeast Asia
- Colors: Yellow; Black
- Owner: Mr.Ap
- Manager: Mr.Hansen
- Championships: MSC 2018; M2 World Championship; M5 World Championship
- Official fan club: Hive
- Partners: Synergy88; Game.ly; ASUS Philippines; NOW Corporation; XSplit; PopTV; Globe Telecom; Team Falcons
- Website: brenesports.com

Aces Pro Bren Esports (formerly Bren Esports), commonly known as AP Bren, is a Southeast Asian professional esports organization based in the Philippines. It has competitive teams in Mobile Legends: Bang Bang, CS:GO, PUBG, League of Legends, Overwatch, Hearthstone, Clash Royale, Arena of Valor, Rules of Survival, Valorant, and Tekken 7. In the Philippine esports league The Nationals, the team competes as Bren EPro. The organization was founded on 16 August 2017 by Bernard "Bren" Chong who is part of the Chong clan that owns World Balance.

In July 2023, the esports team was bought by Aces Pro Corp. replacing the longtime chief executive officer of Bren, Bernard Chong with Jean Alphonse “AJ” Ponce. The newly-acquired team adopts its current name.

== Arena of Valor ==
On 1 October 2018, Bren Esports participated at the Arena of Valor tournament along with four team from Singapore, Malaysia and fellow Filipino team Maxbox Gaming in Philippines for the semi and grand finals of Arena of Valor's Cup Season 3.

== Mobile Legends: Bang Bang (MLBB) ==
=== History ===
Bren Esports's Mobile Legends team competes in the local tournaments for the MPL.

On 22 July 2018, Bren Esports acquired the full Aether Main roster which consisted of YellyHaze, Pein, Ribo, Yuji, Coco and 666. The 6-man roster won the team's first championship title on 29 July 2018 at the Mobile Legends: Bang Bang Southeast Asia Cup (MSC) 2018 held at the Jakarta International Expo in Indonesia.

From 12 to 13 January 2019, eight Filipino participant teams gathered at the Ayala Malls Circuit Makati for Season 3 of MPL (2019).

On 17 January 2019, 666 left the roster and was later replaced by Ejhay who joined the roster on 27 February 2019. On 18 July 2019, Pein left the team and was later replaced by Teng. On 29 October, Teng, Yuji and YellyHaze's departure was announced, leaving Ribo and Coco as the two remaining members from the previous Aether Main roster.

=== Roster Changes Prior to the M2 World Championship ===
On 10 January 2020, KarlTzy, Pheww and Lastii joined the player roster with the addition of Ducky who signed up to as the head coach. FlapTzy later joined the team on 2 July 2020. At that time, Coco changed his role from becoming part of the official playing roster to analyst. In October 2020, they won the MPL Season 6 championship in a best of 7 series, winning against Smart Omega Esports 4 games to 2. This was their second title since Aether Main and their first as the Bren franchise. On 23 January 2021, Bren Esports won the championship for the M2 World Championships held in Singapore, winning against Burmese Ghouls 4 games to 3. The team had to climb up from the lower bracket by defeating two Indonesian powerhouse teams, RRQ Hoshi and Alter Ego to arrange a rematch against Burmese Ghouls. The Bren Esports team won $140,000 from the $300,000 prize pool money, with another $3,000 awarded to the MVP of the match, Carry Karl "KarlTzy" Nepomuceno.

During the Offseason on 6 December 2021, M2 World Champions MVP Karl Gabriel "KarlTzy" Nepomuceno announces his departure from Bren Esports. He has spent 4 seasons with Bren, joining in Season 5, winning a Esports Gold Medal in the 2019 Southeast Asian Games, the MPL Philippines Season 6 Champion, and M2 World Championship Finals MVP. On 11 December 2021, Ejhay left the team and later became the coach for the Sunsparks MLBB team.

=== Bren Victress ===
In June 2019, all the female members of its team got third place in the Female Esports League of Mobile Legends (FSL) which was held at Singapore. Also in June 2019, Bren Esports participated in MSC 2019 at the Smart Araneta Coliseum. On the first day of competition, Bren Esports beat the Team Resolution of Myanmar. In the second day of competition, team Overclockers of Vietnam defeated Bren Esports causing them to be eliminated.

=== Partnership with Team Falcons ===
In the build up for the MPL Philippines Season 13 playoffs, MPL Philippines and the AP Bren organization announced the partnership between AP Bren and Team Falcons prior to the playoffs and the subsequent MSC 2024 in Riyadh. According to reports, the Saudi Arabian-based organization approached AP Bren first in order to align both organization's goals and made sure that the partnership was mutually beneficial for both parties.

The Partnership ended after the conclusion of MLBB M6 World Championship. Team Falcons would enter MPL Philippines as a separate entry in time for MPL-PH Season 15. The team would acquire the roster and coaching staff of MDL Philippines Season 4 champions Lazy Esports for their new roster in MPL PH S15.

=== Tournament results ===
Bren Esports
Year	Season	League	Record		Win Rate		Seed	Final Placement	ESL Snapdragon					MLBB Mid Season Cup	MPLI Invitational	MLBB World Championship
Year	Season	League	Game	Match	Game	Match	Seed	Final Placement	OQ1	OQ2	CS	CF	MM	MLBB Mid Season Cup	MPLI Invitational	MLBB World Championship
2018–19	S2	MPL PH	7-2	15-5	.778	.750	1st	First Runner Up; 1-3 Cignal Ultra	—					Champions; 3-0 Digital Devils Pro	—	—
2019	S3	MPL PH	8-1	17-7	.889	.708	1st	First Runner Up; 2-3 ArkAngel	—					7th-8th Place; 0-2 Overclockers	—	Did not qualify
2019	S4	MPL PH	4-5	9-12	.444	.429	5th	5th-6th Place; 0-2 Execration	—					7th-8th Place; 0-2 Overclockers	—	Did not qualify
2020	S5	MPL PH	8-1	16-4	.889	.800	1st	Second Runner-Up; 1-2 ONIC Philippines	—					Cancelled	First Runner-Up; 0-3 Alter Ego	Champions; 4-3 Burmese Ghouls
2020	S6	MPL PH	12-1	24-4	.923	.857	1st	Champions; 4-2 Smart Omega	—					Cancelled	First Runner-Up; 0-3 Alter Ego	Champions; 4-3 Burmese Ghouls
2021	S7	MPL PH	8-5	19-14	.615	.576	2nd	Third Runner-Up; 2-3 Execration	—					Did not qualify	Did not qualify	Did not qualify
2021	S8	MPL PH	5-9	12-21	.357	.364	7th	Regular Season Finish	—					Did not qualify	Did not qualify	Did not qualify
2022	S9	MPL PH	5-9	11-20	.357	.355	8th	Regular Season Finish	—					Did not qualify	5th-8th Place; 1-2 ONIC Esports	Did not qualify
2022	S10	MPL PH	9-5	20-16	.643	.556	4th	Third Runner Up; 2-3 RSG Philippines	—					Did not qualify	5th-8th Place; 1-2 ONIC Esports	Did not qualify
2023	S11	MPL PH	11-3	23-9	.786	.719	1st	Third Runner Up; 1-3 ECHO Philippines	—					Did not qualify	Second Runner Up; 1-2 RSG Philippines	Champions; 4-3 ONIC Esports
AP Bren
2023	S12	MPL PH	7-7	18-15	.500	.545	2nd	Champions; 4-1 Blacklist International	—					Did not qualify	Second Runner Up; 1-2 RSG Philippines	Champions; 4-3 ONIC Esports
Falcons AP Bren
2024	S13	MPL PH	11-3	24-8	.786	.750	1st	First Runner Up; 0-4 Liquid ECHO	—	—	—	1st	—	First Runner Up; 3-4 Selangor; Red Giants	Defunct	Did not qualify
2024	S14	MPL PH	10-4	22-12	.714	.647	2nd	Second Runner Up; 2-4 Aurora Gaming	—	—	—	1st	—	First Runner Up; 3-4 Selangor; Red Giants	Defunct	Did not qualify
AP Bren
2025	S15	MPL PH	3-11	9-24	.214	.273	7th	Regular Season Finish	—	—	—	—	—	Did not qualify	Defunct	To be determined
2025	S16	MPL PH	To be determined						—	—	—	—	—	Did not qualify	Defunct	To be determined

=== Other tournament awards ===
- Snapdragon Pro Series Season 3 SEA - Challenge Finals (2023) - 3rd Place
- SIBOL 2023 National Team Selection (2023) - 1st Place
- IESF World Esports Championship (2023) - 1st Place
- 2023 Southeast Asian Games (2023) - Gold Medal
- Games of the Future 2024 - 1st Place

=== Current roster ===
MPL Philippines Season 18 AP Bren Mobile Legends: Bang Bang roster
Players
Coaches

Role	Handle	Name	Nationality
EXP Laner	JMPINKNAMAN	Jhon Marl Sebastian	Philippines
Jungler	Jamespangks.	Jonathan James Mendoza	Philippines
Mid Laner	LanceCy	Lance Walter Cunanan	Philippines
Gold Lane	Shizhou	Jan Carl Valdez	Philippines
Roamer	Escalera	Jomearie Delos Santos	Philippines
Roamer	Allen	.	Philippines

Head coach

Christian "Bitoy" Casten

Assistant coach(es)

Robin "Yobabz" Benedicto

Legend:
- (I) Inactive
- (S) Suspended
- Substitute
- (injured) Injury / Illness

Latest roster transaction: August 12, 2026.

== Valorant ==
=== History ===
In September 2021, Bren Esports originally qualified for the 2021 Valorant Champions Tour: Stage 3 Masters in Berlin as the champions of the Southeast Asia Challengers Playoffs, but were unable to secure travel visas for the LAN event due to the national restrictions brought by the COVID-19 pandemic. The team was later acquired by another esports organization, Team Secret.

== Notes ==
1. Played under Aether Main name during MSC 2018.

== See also ==
- World Balance

Awards and achievements
Preceded by IDONOTSLEEP	MSC champions 2018 (as Aether Main)	Succeeded by ONIC Esports
Preceded by EVOS Legends; ECHO Philippines	MLBB World Championship winner 2020; 2023	Succeeded by Blacklist International; ONIC Philippines
Preceded by SunSparks; ECHO Philippines	MPL Philippines winner Season 6 Season 12	Succeeded by Blacklist International; Liquid ECHO
