= World Balance =

Filipino footwear manufacturer

- Company type: Private
- Industry: Footwear
- Founded: 1980; 46 years ago
- Founders: Chong brothers (Arsenio Chong, Armani Chong, and Sin Chong)
- Headquarters: Caloocan, Metro Manila, Philippines
- Area served: Worldwide
- Key people: Barnaby Chong (President and CEO)
- Products: Athletic shoes, apparel, sportswear, sports equipment
- Number of employees: 1000 worldwide (2019 est.)
- Website: worldbalance.com.ph

World Balance (WB or W) is a Filipino sports footwear and apparel brand that was established in 1980. A division of CHG Global, Inc., the brand is one of the Philippines' major sportswear manufacturers.

== History ==
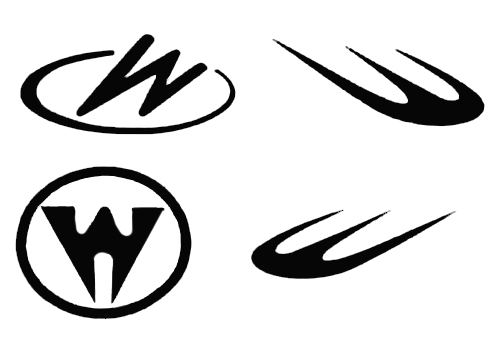
(Clockwise from lower left) First logo used from 1980 to 2009; second logo used from 2010 to 2011; third and current logo flip side; third and current logo.

In 1980, Arsenio Chong, Armani Chong, and Sin Chong founded World Balance International Incorporated in their current location in Caloocan. In 2006, one of the brothers' sons, Barnaby Chong, took over as the president and CEO while other family members took up key positions within the company.

In 2013, the company also launched its sister brand named EasySoft which features shoes made from Vicrotech Material which in terms, being waterproof, flexible, durable and shock-absorbing.

In 2018, the business entity was renamed from World Balance International, Inc. to CHG Global, Inc., reflecting the diversification of the parent company to its other brands and services.

In 2020, the company announced that it was converting some of its manufacturing facilities to produce face masks in response to the COVID-19 pandemic; this has been expanded to include a line of protective apparel.

== Products ==
World Balance manufactures a range of shoes and apparel. Its performance and athlesiure shoes include its Bounce pad and Terrasoft lines, named after the type of foam used in their soles.

The company manufactures lifestyle sneakers worn for fashion, including Disney, Star Wars, Secret Fresh, and Smiley World lines.

EasySoft is World Balance's sister brand which manufactures shoes made from Vicrotech Material for its durability. Most EasySoft shoes are black used for school and office use and serves as an alternative for leather shoes.

World Balance also manufactures a line of everyday apparel, including snap-button shirt-jackets, windbreakers, long-sleeved shirts and track pants, as well as hoodies and sweaters.

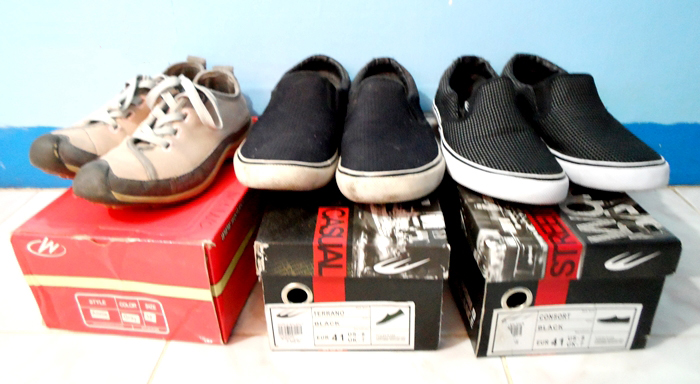
Red box showing short-lived World Balance "refresh" logo from 2010 to 2011, beside shoes and boxes with the current logo introduced in 2012.

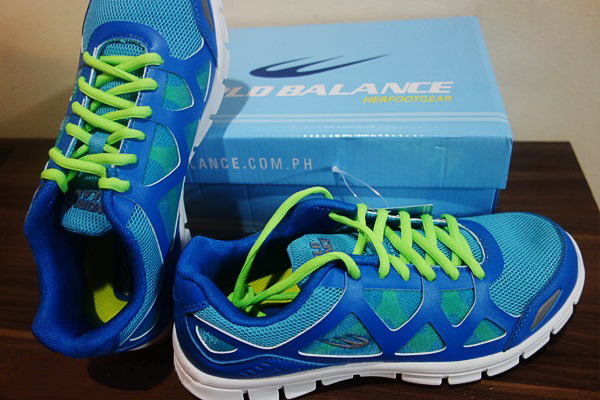
World Balance Hyper Track running shoes.

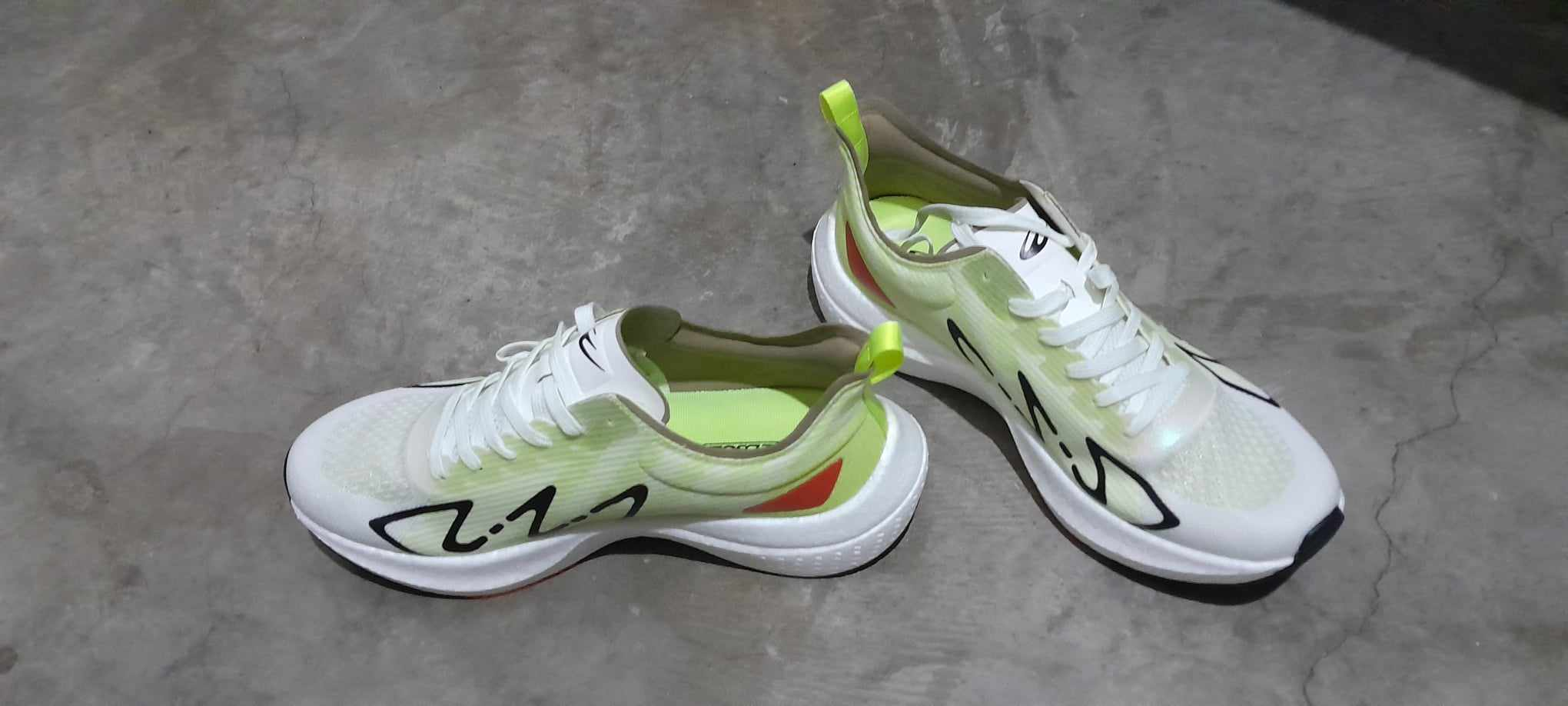
A pair of World Balance Speed Runners for men, released in 2024.

== Sponsorships ==
The company provides licensed merchandise of the Philippine Basketball Association (PBA), and is the official sponsor of PBA team Barangay Ginebra San Miguel. Scottie Thompson is a brand ambassador.

World Balance has entered the sponsors' roster of the Binibining Pilipinas franchise. The Philippine pageant determines future candidates for international pageants such as Miss Universe and Miss International. The brand sponsored some of the pageant's candidates' athletic footwear.
