= MLBB M5 World Championship =

Mobile gaming championship held in Manila, Philippines

- 2023

Tournament information
- Sport: Mobile Legends: Bang Bang
- Dates: 2–17 December 2023
- Administrator: Moonton
- Tournament format(s): Group stage Single Round Robin Format; Playoffs; Double Elimination Format
- Host: Philippines
- Venue(s): EVM Convention Center (Group Stage and Knockouts Stage 1); Rizal Memorial Coliseum (Knockouts Stage 2 and Grand Finals)
- Teams: 16
- Purse: $900,000
- Website: https://m5.mobilelegends.com/

Final positions
- Champion: AP Bren (2nd Title)
- 1st runners-up: ONIC Esports
- 2nd runners-up: Blacklist International

Tournament statistics
- MVP: David "FlapTzy" Canon (AP Bren)
- M5 Fan Choice Award: ONIC Esports

The 2023 Mobile Legends: Bang Bang World Championship, commonly referred to as the M5 World Championships and M5, was the fifth edition of the Mobile Legends: Bang Bang World Championship, an esports tournament for the mobile phone MOBA game Mobile Legends: Bang Bang. The world championship lasted from November 23 until December 17, 2023.

This edition of the world series foresaw an increase in regional and team participation with new entries including South Asia, Mekong, Mongolia and China. Meanwhile, team qualifications for Latin America increased from one representative to two for this edition. This world championship featured the first wild card event where eight (8) teams from the aforementioned regions including Malaysia, Europe, MENA, and LATAM were able to compete for two wildcard slots. It also featured then, the highest prize pool for any international MLBB competition at $900,000, and the highest number of team participation in all of its editions.

In the Grand Finals, AP Bren won the M5 World Championship title in seven games, defeating Indonesia's ONIC Esports making them the only organization thus far to win two-world championship titles. This was the second-time that an Indonesian and Filipino representative faced each other in the Grand Finals of a major MLBB tournament, the first being Blacklist International and ONIC Esports during MSC 2023.

The Grand Finals match also broke the M4 World Championship’s Grand Finals viewership record—recording 5,067,107 peak live viewers during the match, making it the most-watched MLBB game in history and the second-most watched game in 2023, just behind the 2023 League of Legends World Championship between T1 and Weibo Gaming.

== Background ==
Following M4, the MLBB M5 World Championships is the fifth Mobile Legends: Bang Bang World Championship and the first edition of the games to be held in the Philippines. Malaysia was later announced to be the host of the wildcard round.

Previously, Malaysia, Singapore, and Indonesia held the first four editions of the games, M1 in Kuala Lumpur; M2 and M3 in Singapore; and M4 in Jakarta.

M5 featured teams from Asia, North America, the Middle East and North Africa (MENA), Europe and Latin America. Teams qualified through their region's qualification method, whether it be an MPL Region or a Moonton-approved qualification tournament.

== Venue ==
The M5 World Championship was announced to be held in Metro Manila.

Alongside Moonton, the country's Department of Tourism organized the event. EVM Convention Center (located in Quezon City) hosted the group stage and first knockouts stage of M5. On the other hand, the latter knockout stages and grand finals was held at the Rizal Memorial Coliseum in Manila. The selling of tickets for the event started on October 25.

Group Stage and Knockout Stage Phase 1	Knockout Stage Phase 2 and Grand Finals	Venues within Metro Manila
Quezon City	Manila	Venues within Metro Manila
EVM Convention Center	Rizal Memorial Coliseum	Venues within Metro Manila
Capacity: 1,659	Capacity: 6,100	Venues within Metro Manila

== Qualified teams ==
Qualifying for the M5 World Championship comes from the competing nation's Mobile Legends: Bang Bang Professional League or commonly known as "MPL." However, regional qualifiers in the North America, Turkey, Myanmar, and Latin American regions were also held to broaden the reach of the Championship's teams. Two teams shall also qualify from the M5 Wildcards.

M5 will feature the European region for the fourth time since its absence in the last M4 World Championship. The number of natural qualifiers for MPL Malaysia have also been reduced to one. Instead of having its own slot, Brazil is now included in the Latin America region for a chance in the two regional teams participating for the world championship.

The defending World Champions in ECHO Philippines would not be completing their back-to-back championship titles due to them being eliminated by Blacklist International in the Lower Grand Finals of MPL Philippines Season 12.

- Group Stage: December 2 to 7, 2023
  - 16 teams will be divided into 2 groups.
  - Single Round Robin, all matches are played in a Bo3.
  - Top 2 teams from each groups will advance to Knockout Stage.
  - Bottom 2 teams from each groups will be eliminated from the tournament.
- Knockout Stage: December 9 to 17, 2023
  - 8 teams from Group Stage will play in a double-elimination bracket.
    - All Matches will be played in a Bo5 except Grand Final.
    - Grand Finals will be played in a Bo7.

Region	League	Qualification method	Team name	ID	Group
Philippines	MPL Philippines	MPL Philippines Season 12 Champions	(Philippines) AP Bren	APBR	C
Philippines	MPL Philippines	MPL Philippines Season 12 Runners-Up	(Philippines) Blacklist International	BLCK	B
Indonesia	MPL Indonesia	MPL Indonesia Season 12 Champions	(Indonesia) ONIC Esports	ONIC	A
Indonesia	MPL Indonesia	MPL Indonesia Season 12 Runners-Up	(Indonesia) Geek Fam ID	GEEK	D
Latin America	Liga LATAM	Liga LATAM 2023 Champions	(Brazil) RRQ Akira	RRQ	B
Latin America	Liga LATAM	Liga LATAM 2023 Runners-Up	(Brazil) Bigetron Sons	BTR	A
Malaysia	MPL Malaysia	MPL Malaysia Season 12 Champions	(Malaysia) HomeBois	HB	D
Singapore	MPL Singapore	MPL Singapore Season 6 Champions	(Singapore) Team Flash	FL	C
Cambodia	MPL Cambodia	MPL Cambodia Autumn Split 2023 Champions	(Cambodia) SeeYouSoon	SYS	A
Middle East and North Africa	MPL MENA	MPL MENA Fall Split 2023 Champions	(Saudi Arabia) Triple Esports	TE	A
Myanmar	M5 Myanmar Qualifiers	M5 Myanmar Qualifier Champions	(Myanmar) Burmese Ghouls	BG	C
Turkiye	MTC Turkiye Championship	MLBB Türkiye Şampiyonası Season 2 Champions	(Turkey) Fire Flux Esports	FF	B
North America	MLBB NACT	MLBB NACT Fall Season 2023 Champions	(United States) TheOhioBrothers	TOB	D
Eastern Europe and Central Asia	MLBB Continental Championships	MLBB Continental Championships Season 2 Champions	(Commonwealth of Independent States) Deus Vult	DeVu	D
Malaysia	M5 Wildcard Qualifiers	M5 Wildcard Qualifying Team	(Malaysia) Team SMG	SMG	B
Mongolia	M5 Wildcard Qualifiers	M5 Wildcard Qualifying Team	(Mongolia) Team Lilgun	lg	C

Notable teams including ONIC Esports, SeeYouSoon, RRQ Akira and Team SMG returns to the world stage from their previous World Championship campaigns. Notably, ONIC Esports and RRQ Akira returns after M4 and Team SMG and SeeYouSoon returns after M3.

Amid the new format of the MLBB World Championship, two teams, AP Bren and Burmese Ghouls, made a return after their M2 campaign. AP Bren were the MLBB M2 World Champions, defeating Burmese Ghouls in the process. Formerly known as Bren Esports, the M2 World Champions included players such as Carlito "Ribo" Ribo Jr., Allan "Lusty" Jr., Ralph "Coco" Sampang, and Karl "KarlTzy" Nepomuceno. After their victory over Blacklist International, M2 World Champions Angelo Kyle "Pheww" Arcangel and Charles "FlapTzy" Canon returned to the international stage alongside M2 World Champion Coach Francis "Ducky" Glindro.

Meanwhile, Burmese Ghouls returns with a new roster with new faces than the M2 squad.

== Official rosters ==
Returning teams from the previous MLBB World Championships include Blacklist International, ONIC Esports and RRQ Akira while newer teams such as Geek Fam Indonesia, Bigetron Sons, HomeBois, Team Flash, Triple Esports, Fire Flux Esports, TheOhioBrothers and most of the wildcard teams will be part of their first world championships.

AP Bren marks a return as the M2 World Champions alongside Burmese Ghouls who were their finals opponents on the aforementioned series, Blacklist International are returning for their third-consecutive Worlds after winning M3 and runners-up for M4. SeeYouSoon and Team SMG returns since M3 and Deus Vult returns since M1.

Team	League	Jungle	EXP	Mid	Gold	Roam	Substitute(s)		Coach(es)		Analyst(s)
AP Bren	MPL PH	KyleTzy (Michael Sayson)	FlapTzy (David Canon)	Pheww(Angelo Arcangel)	Super Marco (Marco Requitiano)	Owgwen (Rowgien Unigo)	Pandora (Vincent Unigo)		Ducky (Francis Glindro)		Vrendon Lim (Vrendon Pesebre)
Blacklist International	MPL PH	Sensui (Stephen Castillo)	Edward (Edward Dapadap)	Hadji (Salic Imam)	Oheb (Kiel Soriano)	Renejay (Renejay Barcase)	Owl (Lee Gonzales)	Yue (Kenneth Tadeo)	Master the Basics (Aniel Jiandani)		Dex Star (Dexter Alaba)
ONIC Esports	MPL ID	Kairi (Kairi Rayosdelsol)	Butss (Muhammad Sanubari)	S A N Z (Gilang)	CW (Calvin Winata)	Kiboy (Nicky Pontonuwu)	Albert (Albert Iskandar)		Coach Yeb (Denver Miranda)		Adi (Adi Asyauri)
Geek Fam Indonesia	MPL ID	Nnael (Manuel Simbolon)	Luke (Luke Valentinus)	Aboy (Valen Putra)	Markyyyy (Mark Capacio)	Baloyskie (Allen Baloy)	Caderaa (Mohammad Pambudi)		Ervan (Ervan Pratama)		N/A
RRQ Akira	Liga LATAM	Kiing (Lucas Godoy)	Tekashi (Arthur Nascimento)	Seigen (Matheus Lima)	Gustalagusta (Gustavo Lima)	Luiizz (Luiz Alves)	Blink (Gabriel Favoreto)		Cabral (Godman Cabral)		N/A
Bigetron Sons	Liga LATAM	Buzizio (Everton Mattos)	Bllack (Felipe Prado)	Sindra (Luis Tavares)	Upa (Lucas Araujo)	Lunna (Victor Monteiro)	Akashi (Nicolas Vieira)		Daarkness (Diego Casado)		Hoooky (Breno Almeida)
HomeBois	MPL MY	Chibi (Muhammad Nazhan bin Mohd Nor)	Sepat (Muhammad Irfan bin Aujang)	Warlord (Rizky Agustian)	RaizeL (Wahyu Saputra)	Xorn (Mohammad Zul Hisham bin Mohd Noor)	Anip (Muhammad Haniff bin Abdul Rashid)	Vins (Muhammad Nazreen bin Nasir)	(H.C.) Pabz (Khairul Azman bin Mohd Sharif)	(A.C.) Saiful (Muhammad Saiful Bin Aujang)	Antagonist (M Bachiri)
Team Flash	MPL SG	Hadess (Jaymark Lazaro)	Adammir (Adam Chong)	Jayy (Jay Chng)	Vanix (Keith Lim)	Lolsie (Bellamy Yeov)	Bloopymiku (Leong Kai Xiang)		Kayzeepi (Eugene Kong)		Remaniscent (Remas Hong)
SeeYouSoon	MPL KH	MP the King (Michael Endino)	FELIX (Leng Kimhak)	Raa (Sovann Chanmakara)	Kousei (Clarense Camilo)	BOXI (Sok Viera)	Tuzu (Lim Bunheng)	RUNN (Mon Phearun)	(H.C.) Cattt (Chhim Vitou)	(A.C.) Jin	N/A
Triple Esports	MENA	Tarzan (Mohammed Kharabah)	Sanji (Ayman Alqarni)	Cuffin (Muath Alkoraini)	Fury (Ahmad Zeyad)	Troll (Moayed Kharaba)	Saano (Sulaiman Alrashdi)	Krauser	Lyrick (Hendrich Clahi)		Zuzu (Khaled Zouzou)
Deus Vult	CIS	Magistor (Eduard Rukosuev)	Kid Bomba (Mathaios Chazilakos)	Sunset Lover (Kemiran Kochkarov)	Carvi (Carl Tinio)	SAWO (Stansilav Reshnyak)	Shisu1Skie (Alikhan Madibekov)	Lil (Ruslan Degtev)	Flysolo (Kenneth Coloma)		N/A
Fire Flux Esports	MTC	Tienzy (Sidar Menteşe)	Alien (Bariş Ali Çakir)	Rosa (Ahmet Taha Batir)	Sunshine (Emre Sari)	APEX47 (Furkan Akbulut)	Paranoid (Osman Karademir)		Badgalseph (Sacit Arslan)		SIGIBUM (Şiyar Akbulut)
TheOhioBrothers	NACT	Bestplayer1(Carlos Ortega Vega)	Mielow (Chris Enobio)	Hoon (Jang Seong-hoon)	ZIA (Ziameth-Jei Caluya)	SHARK (Vo Trung)	Wrath (Jared Gillespie)		PikaPikaML (Steve Tran)		N/A
Burmese Ghouls	M5Q - MYA	Niko (Hein Arkar Htet)	Carbon (Thiha Kyaw)	Lina (Kaung Min Khant)	Stitch (Htet Linn Hlyan Aung)	Blink (Kyaw Thuya)	Shadow (Kaung Htet Hein)		(H.C.) Lynn Daddy (Thet Lynn Htut)	(A.C.) DJ (Daung Jaune)	N/A

== M5 Wild Card ==
MLBB M5 Wild Card
- 2023

Tournament information
- Sport: Mobile Legends: Bang Bang
- Dates: November 23–26, 2023
- Administrator: Moonton
- Tournament format(s): Group stage Single Round Robin Format
- Host: Malaysia
- Venue: Jio Space
- Teams: 8
- Purse: $900,000

The M5 Wild Card tournament is a qualifying tournament for the MLBB M5 World Championship, an esports tournament for the Mobile Game Mobile Legends: Bang Bang.

The M5 World Championship was the first edition to include a wild card round. The top two teams will qualify for the main tournament.

- Wildcard Groups: November 23 to 25, 2023
  - 8 teams will be randomly drawn into 2 groups.
  - Single Round Robin, all matches are played in a Bo1.
  - Top 2 teams from each groups will play in Crossover Match.
  - Bottom 2 teams from each groups will be eliminated from the tournament.
- Crossover Match: November 26, 2023
  - First place will compete in a Bo5 against the second placer from the other group.
  - Winner of each matches will advance to Group Stage.
  - Loser will be eliminated.

Region	League	Qualification method	Team name	ID	Group
South Asia	MLBB Champion Battles (MCB)	MLBB Champion Battles (MCB) Champions	(Nepal) 4Merical Esports	4M	A
Mekong Region	M5 M Challenge Cup	M5 M Challenge Cup Champions	(Laos) Niightmare Esports	NM	A
Malaysia	MPL Malaysia	MPL Malaysia Season 12 Runners-Up	(Malaysia) Team SMG	SMG	A
Latin America	Liga LATAM	Liga LATAM 2023 2nd Runners-Up	(Peru) Imperio Esports	IMPE	B
Eastern Europe and Central Asia	MLBB Continental Championship	MLBB Continental Championship Season 2 Runners-Up	(Commonwealth of Independent States) Umbrella Squad	US	B
Mongolia	MLBB ESN National Championship	MLBB ESN National Champions	(Mongolia) Team Lilgun	lg	B
Middle East and North Africa	MPL MENA	MPL MENA Fall Split 2023 Runners-Up	(Saudi Arabia) Team Falcons	FLCN	A
China	M5 China Qualifier	M5 China Qualifier Champions	(China) Keep Best Gaming	KBG	B

=== Wild Card roster ===
Team	Players								Coach/Manager
Team	Jungle		Exp Lane		Gold Lane		Midlaner	Roamer	Coach/Manager
(China) KeepBestGaming	(China) Simba (Wang Yi)	(China) Past (Wang Xupeng)	(China) Siyu (Gao Yifan)		(China) Godyang (Yang Yang)		(China) LMU (Shen Yuan)	(China) Tides (Yang Shangteng)	(China) Webby (Chen Jiawei)
Team Lilgun	Zxaura (Bagabandi Tegshjargal)		Aizn (Enkhbat Munkhharaa)		Bebex (Erdenemunkh Chinsukh)		Forbid (Amarmurun Mandakh)	Ethan (Batbold Batjargal)	zMitch (Mitch Sato)
4Merical Esports	Lunatic Panda (Biplak Kandangwa)		Masarap (Aayush Bhandari)		Yahiko (Aayush Rai)	Hybrid	Xerox (Alish Shrestha)	Clock (Sudeep Bolakhe)	Amoux (Muhammad Ariff Iswandi bin Johar)
Niightmare Esports	2Ez4Lexxy (Mongkonethong Sinbandit)		Jvckkk (Vanvilay Ouanlamany)	Juviana (Phoutthavan Pheugpasomxay)	Khammy (Khampaseuth Hanxana)		Sosoul (Phonesana Inthavongxay)	J4zBin (Sengathit Phounsavat)	Alain (Sathapone Kayavong)
Umbrella Squad	(Russia) Marl (Sergey Finashev)	(Russia) Fangor (Gorin Stanislav Sergeevich)	(Russia) Castle (Atalaev Ramazan Atalaevich)		(Russia) BlackMarch (Falin Timur Jurevich)		(Russia) (Azerbaijan) Troublemaker (Shakhid Mokhammad)	(Russia) A F K (Loginov Andrey Yurevich)	Defender (Andrii Martynenko)
(Saudi Arabia) Team Falcons	Lio (Mahmoud Mostafa Mahmoud Elsayed)		Hulk (Abdulaziz Helal M. Sulaimani)		Lawtrick (Patrick Lawrence G. Ciego)		Goodnight (Fabito Jelo)	Super (Ahmad Sameer Ibraheem Alzaglul)	(Saudi Arabia) Kevin
(Argentina) Imperio	AURORAA (Juan Sebastian Tello)		Markinho (Marcó Dario Maita Colque)		Yur (Matias Ezequiel Canaviri Vargas)		Feshin (Juan Jose Rafael)	Stephe (José Carlos Loayza Machaca)	El Viejo (Maximiliano Omar Frenedoso Aragona)
(Malaysia) Team SMG	(Malaysia) Subway (Wan Mohamad Danish Safwan Bin Mohd Sakirin)	(Philippines) Saxa (Kenneth Fedelin)	(Malaysia) Smooth (Aeliff Adam Md Ariff)		(Malaysia) Sasa (Lu Khai Bean)		(Malaysia) Stormie (Hazziq Danish Bin Mohamad Rizwan)	(Philippines) Mikko (Deomark Tabangay)	(Philippines) Coach Pao (Ren Paolo Villanueva)

=== Group stage ===
==== Group A ====
Pos	Team	Pld	W	L	GF	GA	GD	Qualification	Team SMG	Nightmare Esports	Team Falcons	4Merical Esports
1	Team SMG (H)	3	3	0	6	2	+4	Qualification for Wildcard Bracket	—	2–1	2–1	2–0
2	Nightmare Esports	3	2	1	5	3	+2	Qualification for Wildcard Bracket	1–2	—	2–1	2–0
3	Team Falcons	3	1	2	4	4	0		1–2	1–2	—	2–0
4	4Merical Esports	3	0	3	0	6	−6		0–2	0–2	0–2	—

Updated to match(es) played on unknown. Source: Moonton
(H) Hosts

==== Group B ====
Pos	Team	Pld	W	L	GF	GA	GD	Qualification	Team Lilgun	Imperio Esports	Umbrella Squad	Keep Best Gaming
1	Team Lilgun	3	3	0	6	2	+4	Qualification for Wildcard Bracket	—	2–1	2–1	2–0
2	Imperio Esports	3	2	1	5	2	+3	Qualification for Wildcard Bracket	1–2	—	2–0	2–1
3	Umbrella Squad	3	1	2	3	4	−1		1–2	0–2	—	2–0
4	Keep Best Gaming	3	0	3	0	6	−6		0–2	0–2	0–2	—

Updated to match(es) played on unknown. Source: Moonton

=== Crossover match ===
Knockout Round (Best-of-5)
1A	Team SMG	3
2B	Imperio Esports	1
1B	Team Lilgun	3
2A	Nightmare Esports	0

Qualified Teams
1A	Team SMG	Qualified for Group B
1B	Team Lilgun	Qualified for Group C

== Main Stage ==
=== Draw ===
On November 3, the mechanics of the Group Draw was announced for the M5 Tournament proper, not the Wild Card tournament. There were three pool of teams: Pool 1, Pool 2 and Pool 3. Pool 1 contained the champions and runners-up of MPL Philippines and MPL Indonesia Season 12 in AP Bren, ONIC Esports, Blacklist International and Geek Fam. Pool 2 contained eight champions from different regions including Malaysia, Singapore, Cambodia and Turkey. Pool 3 showcased Deus Vult, Bigetron Sons, and two of the qualifying wildcard teams.

The Group Draw followed three outlying principles:

- Principle A: All Teams from the same region can no be drawn into the same group;
- Principle B: All Teams from Pool 1 will not be drawn into the same group; All Teams from Pool 3 will not be drawn into the same group;
- Principle C: The Serpentine Order of Drawing will be followed: ABCD-ABCD-ABCD-ABCD.

The Group Draw was accompanied with a Press Conference on November 4, 2023. Special Guests Gerald "Dlar" Trinchera and Jonard "Demonkite" Caranto were invited as Guest Stars for the said event.

Group Draw Pools
Pool 1	Pool 2		Pool 3
(Philippines) AP Bren	(Turkey) Fire Flux Esports	(Brazil) RRQ Akira	(Commonwealth of Independent States) Deus Vult
(Philippines) Blacklist International	(Cambodia) SeeYouSoon	(Malaysia) HomeBois	(Brazil) Bigetron Sons
(Indonesia) ONIC Esports	(Myanmar) Burmese Ghouls	(Singapore) Team Flash	M5 Wildcard Team 1
(Indonesia) Geek Fam ID	(United States) TheOhioBrothers	(Saudi Arabia) Triple Esports	M5 Wildcard Team 2

M5 World Championship Groups
Group A	Group B	Group C	Group D
(Indonesia) ONIC Esports	(Philippines) Blacklist International	(Philippines) AP Bren	(Indonesia) Geek Fam ID
(Cambodia) SeeYouSoon	(Turkey) Fire Flux Esports	(Myanmar) Burmese Ghouls	(United States) TheOhioBrothers
(Saudi Arabia) Triple Esports	(Brazil) RRQ Akira	(Singapore) Team Flash	(Malaysia) HomeBois
(Brazil) Bigetron Sons	(Malaysia) Team SMG	(Mongolia) Team Lilgun	(Commonwealth of Independent States) Deus Vult

=== Group stage ===
==== Group A ====
Pos	Team	Pld	W	L	GF	GA	GD	Qualification	ONIC	SYS	TE	BTR
1	ONIC Esports	3	3	0	6	0	+6	Qualified for the Knockout Brackets	—	2–0	2–0	2–0
2	See You Soon	3	2	1	4	2	+2	Qualified for the Knockout Brackets	0–2	—	2–0	2–0
3	Triple Esports	3	1	2	2	5	−3		0–2	0–2	—	2–1
4	Bigetron Sons	3	0	3	1	6	−5		0–2	0–2	1–2	—

==== Group B ====
Pos	Team	Pld	W	L	GF	GA	GD	Qualification	FFE	BLCK	RRQ-A	SMG
1	Fire Flux Esports	3	2	1	5	2	+3	Qualified for the Knockout Brackets	—	2–0	1–2	2–0
2	Blacklist International (H)	3	2	1	4	3	+1	Qualified for the Knockout Brackets	0–2	—	2–1	2–0
3	RRQ Akira	3	1	2	3	5	−2		2–1	1–2	—	1–2
4	Team SMG	3	1	2	3	5	−2		0–2	0–2	2–1	—

Source: Moonton
(H) Hosts

==== Group C ====
Pos	Team	Pld	W	L	GF	GA	GD	Qualification	APBR	BG	FL	LG
1	AP Bren (H)	3	3	0	6	0	+6	Qualified for the Knockout Brackets	—	2–0	2–0	2–0
2	Burmese Ghouls	3	1	2	3	4	−1	Qualified for the Knockout Brackets	0–2	—	2–0	1–2
3	Team Flash	3	1	2	3	5	−2		0–2	0–2	—	2–1
4	Team Lilgun	3	1	2	2	5	−3		0–2	2–1	1–2	—

Source: Moonton
(H) Hosts

==== Group D ====
Pos	Team	Pld	W	L	GF	GA	GD	Qualification	GEEK	DeVu	HB	TOB
1	Geek Fam ID	3	2	1	4	3	+1	Qualified for the Knockout Brackets	—	2–1	0–2	2–0
2	Deus Vult	3	2	1	5	4	+1	Qualified for the Knockout Brackets	1–2	—	2–1	2–1
3	Homebois	3	1	2	4	4	0		2–0	1–2	—	1–2
4	TheOhioBrothers	3	1	2	3	5	−2		0–2	1–2	2–1	—

Source: Moonton

=== Knockout Stage ===
Upper Bracket Quarterfinals (Best-of-5)	Upper Bracket Semifinals (Best of 5)	Upper Bracket Finals (Best of 5)	Grand Finals (Best of 7)
B1	Fire Flux Esports	1
D2	Deus Vult	3
D2	Deus Vult	0
A1	ONIC Esports	3
A1	ONIC Esports	3
B2	Blacklist Int.	2
A1	ONIC Esports	3
C1	AP Bren	0
C1	AP Bren	3
A2	See You Soon	1
C1	(Philippines) AP Bren	3
D1	(Indonesia) Geek Fam ID	1
D1	Geek Fam ID	3
C2	Burmese Ghouls	2	A1	ONIC Esports	3
C1	AP Bren	4
Lower Bracket Knockouts (Best of 5)	Lower Bracket Quarterfinals (Best of 5)	Lower Bracket Semifinals (Best of 5)	Lower Bracket Finals (Best of 5)
B2	Blacklist Int.	3
B1	Fire Flux Esports	1	D1	Geek Fam ID	1	B2	Blacklist Int.	0
B2	Blacklist Int.	3	B2	Blacklist Int.	3	C1	AP Bren	3
D2	Deus Vult	0
A2	See You Soon	2
A2	(Cambodia) See You Soon	3	D2	Deus Vult	3
C2	(Myanmar) Burmese Ghouls	0

The series between See You Soon and Deus Vult in the Lower Bracket Quarterfinals was a first in the world stage as Deus Vult were able to reverse sweep See You Soon after falling in a 2–0 deficit. It was Malaysia's Todak who was able to pull off a reverse sweep during the knockout stage in an MLBB World Championships, reverse sweeping CIS representative Natus Vincere 3–2 in M3.

ONIC Esports denied AP Bren its Grand Finals spot in the Upper Bracket Final after a 3–0 sweep over the Philippine champions. The Grand Final match would be the first Philippines vs. Indonesian Final in the M-Series and the first Indonesian appearance since M1. AP Bren defeated Blacklist International 3–0 in the Lower Bracket Finals to face a rematch against ONIC. After holding a 3–1 lead, ONIC won two straight games to force Game 7 which AP Bren won through a crucial pickoff on Kairi "Kairi" Rayosdelsol while traversing the bush in the middle lane.

=== Final standings ===
Region and team name	League	Match wins					W/L finish	Win rate	Final placement	Prize
Region and team name	League	WC	CM	GS	KB	GF	W/L finish	Win rate	Final placement	Prize
AP Bren	MPL PH	—	—	6-0	9-5	4-3	19-8	.704	Champions	$300,000
ONIC Esports	MPL ID	—	—	6-0	9-2	3-4	18-6	.750	1st Runner-up	$120,000
Blacklist International	MPL PH	—	—	4-3	11-8	Eliminated	15-11	.577	2nd Runner-up	$80,000
Deus Vault	MCC	—	—	5-4	6-9	Eliminated	11-8	.579	3rd Runner-up	$55,000
SeeYouSoon	MPL KH	—	—	4-2	6-6	Eliminated	10-8	.556	5th–6th	$40,000
Geek Fam Indonesia	MPL ID	—	—	4-3	5-8	Eliminated	9-11	.450	5th–6th	$40,000
Burmese Ghouls	M5Q	—	—	3-4	2-6	Eliminated	5-9	.357	7th–8th	$30,000
Fire Flux Esports	MTC	—	—	5-2	2-6	Eliminated	11-8	.579	7th–8th	$30,000
Triple Esports	MENA	—	—	2-5	Eliminated		2-5	.286	9th–12th	$20,000
Team Flash	MPL SG	—	—	3-5	Eliminated		3-5	.375	9th–12th	$20,000
HomeBois	MPL MY	—	—	4-4	Eliminated		4-4	.500	9th–12th	$20,000
(Malaysia) Team SMG	MPL MY	3-0	3-1	3-5	Eliminated		9-6	.600	9th–12th	$20,000
RRQ Akira	LATAM	—	—	3-5	Eliminated		3-5	.375	13th–16th	$15,000
Team Lilgun	MGLQ	3-0	3-0	2-5	Eliminated		8-5	.615	13th–16th	$15,000
Bigetron Sons	LATAM	—	—	1-6	Eliminated		1-6	.143	13th–16th	$15,000
TheOhioBrothers	NACT	—	—	3-5	Eliminated		3-5	.200	13th–16th	$15,000
Niightmare Esports	MEKONG	2-1	0-3	Eliminated			2–4	.333	17th–18th	$10,000
(Argentina) Imperio	LATAM	2-1	1-3	Eliminated			3–4	.429	17th–18th	$10,000
(Saudi Arabia) Team Falcons	MENA	1-2	Eliminated				1–2	.333	19th–20th	$10,000
Umbrella Squad	MCC	0-3	Eliminated				0–3	.000	19th–20th	$10,000
4Merical Esports	M5SAQ	0-3	Eliminated				0–3	.000	21st–22nd	$10,000
(China) KeepBestGaming	M5CHQ	0-3	Eliminated				0–3	.000	21st–22nd	$10,000

AP Bren recorded a .704 win rate during the entirety of the competition, tying ONIC with a 6–0 record in the Group Stage. AP Bren defeated See You Soon (3-1) and Geek Fam Indonesia (3-1) in the Knockout stage but fell to the lower-bracket to ONIC Esports in 0-3. They recorded a 13–11 record for the entirety of the knockout stage with the Grand Finals included. ONIC Esports has the highest winning rate of .750 among all teams in M5 followed by Team Lilgun (.615) and Team SMG (.600).

=== Special awards ===
Special awards were distributed during the opening program of the Grand Finale of M5. Spearheaded by Sophie Guo, the Regional Esports Head of Moonton Games, awarded The M5 Fan Choice Award to ONIC Esports' Assistant Coach, Ahmad "Mars" Fakhre.

- M5 Fan Choice Award: ONIC Esports

==== M-Series 5th Anniversary: Greatest 10 Players Award ====
The M-Series 5th Anniversary individual awards were released prior to the playoffs of the M5 World Championships. The nomination process went through certain criteria released by Moonton. However, the nominees were plagued into controversies due to the snubbing of the "VEEWISE" duo of Johnmar "OhMyV33Nus" Villaluna and Danerie James "Wise Del Rosario due to their affiliation with the online-betting site Rivalry. Furthermore, M3 World Champion Finals MVP Kiel Calvin "OHEB" Soriano was also snubbed in the nomination process. The controversy led to the withdrawal of Naing Lin "ACE" Swe from being a contender due to his own affiliation with a separate online-betting site which caused outraged from Burmese fans. Swe withdrew from being part of the nomination list and on a shorter notice, Moonton released a public apology for their unseen overview of the situation.

The list of awardees were made up of 6 Filipino players, 3 Indonesian players and 1 Burmese player.

Name	IGN	Role	Region	Accomplishment(s)
Angelo Arcangel	Pheww	Mid Lane	Philippines	2x MPL Philippines champion; 2x MLBB World champion
Swan Aung	RubyDD	EXP Lane	Myanmar	3x MPL Myanmar champion
Muhammad Ikhsan	Lemon	Mid Lane	Indonesia	4x MPL Indonesia champion
Edward Dapadap	Edward	EXP Lane	Philippines	3x MPL Philippines champion; 1x MLBB World champion; 2x MPL Philippines Finals MVP
Salic Imam	Hadji	Multirole	Philippines	3x MPL Philippines champion; 1x MLBB world champion; 1x MPL Philippines regular season MVP; 1x MPL Philippines Finals MVP
Tristan Cabrera	Yawi	Roamer	Philippines	1x MPL Philippines champion
Eko Julianto	Oura	Gold Lane	Indonesia	1x MPL Indonesia champion; 1x MLBB World Champion; 1x MLBB World Finals MVP
Kairi Rayosdelsol	Kairi	Jungler	Philippines	3x MPL Indonesia champion; 1x MSC champion; 1x MPL Indonesia Finals MVP; 1x MPL Indonesia Regular Season MVP
Nicky Pontonuwu	Kiboy	Roamer	Indonesia	4x MPL Indonesia champion; 1x MSC champion; 2x MPL Indonesia Finals MVP; 2x MPL Indonesia Regular Season MVP
Karl Nepomuceno	KarlTzy	Jungler	Philippines	2x MPL Philippines champion; 2x MLBB World Champion; 1x MLBB World Finals MVP; 1x MPL Philippines Finals MVP; 1x MPL Philippines Regular Season MVP

== Marketing ==
=== Sponsors ===
The M5 World Championships oversees regional partners from different countries to get the chance to stream the tournament in the participating countries and also worldwide.

Company name	Classification	Country/region of partnership
ASUS Republic of Gamers	Official Gaming Phone	Global
Qiddiya City	Presenting Partner	Global
Grab Unlimited	Official Superapp Partner	Global
Secretlab	Official Chair Partner	Global
Smart Telecommunications	Official Telco Partner	Philippines
Maya	Official Digital Bank	Philippines
EVM Convention Center	Venue Partner	Philippines
Philippine Sports Commission	Venue Partner	Philippines
Department of Tourism	Endorser	Philippines
Hotlink	Official Mobile Internet	Malaysia
Nescafé	Official Beverage	Malaysia
TNTCO	Official Merchandise Partner	Malaysia
Astro Arena	Official Broadcast Partner	Malaysia
ESI	Strategic Partner	Malaysia
Pejabat Belia Dan Sukan	Strategic Partner	Malaysia
TVRI Sport	Official Broadcaster	Indonesia
Vidio	Official Broadcaster	Indonesia
Indomaret	Merchandise Partner	Indonesia

=== M5 Pass ===
Moonton announced that the Fighter Hero Yu Zhong will be receiving this edition's special M5 Pass Skin. The M5 Pass is a in-game pass that gives players rewards and incentives while doing Daily Tasks and Challenges. The M5 Pass includes custom M5 effects such as Recall Animations, Kill Animations, a Trail Animation for the Hero, Limited Edition Skins and in-game rewards that can be used to unlock more rewards.

Upon purchasing any M5 Pass, Yu Zhong's "Dragon's Shade" Skin would be attained by every person who purchase it while its prime skin "Cosmic Dragon" is able to be attained once the player's M5 pass reaches Level 75. The M5 Pass was officially made to be available on November 20.

=== Theme song ===
On November 12, 2023, the song "Better Than Great" was released as the official song of the tournament in Spotify.

Ten days later on November 22, the music video for Better Than Great was released featuring several players participating and players who made a great impact for MLBB worldwide like ONIC Esports' Kairi Rayosdelsol and Nicky "Kiboy" Pontonuwu, Avalon's Jungler Michael "MobaZane" Cosgun, Nicholas "Akashi" Vieira of Bigetron Sons, ECHO Philippines' Karl "KarlTzy" Nepomuceno, Zikry "Moon" Shamsuddin of Todak, and symbolism from Johnmar "OhMyV33Nus" Villaluna's "Queen" Pose. As of December 15, 2023, the Music Video has 2.5 million views on YouTube.

=== Championship skin ===
Following AP Bren's victory, news outlets and reports repeatedly asked about the hero that the team will pick in for their championship skin. It was decided that AP Bren has chosen the Marksman hero "Brody" for their championship skin as it was a signature pick for the team when it was open during drafting phases.

On March 20, 2024, Mobile Legends announced through their Facebook Page that Brody will become the official championship skin for the team. However, Finals MVP David "FlapTzy" Canon will be co-designing the very first "Finals MVP Skin" which was the Fighter hero "Paquito" making M5 the first world championship series to have two championship skins: One for the team and One from the Finals MVP.

== Controversies ==
On October 28, the Philippines' MLBB M5 Greatest Players Nominees were unveiled prior to the Grand Finals stage between AP Bren and Blacklist International. The nominees snubbed names such as Johnmar "OhMyV33Nus" Villaluna, Danerie "Wise" Del Rosario and Kiel Calvin "Oheb" Soriano during the announcement. Furthermore, during the MLBB M5 Trailer, little-to-no footage were depicted showing the MLBB M3 World Championships, to which Blacklist International won.

Del Rosario and Villaluna took to YouTube where they address the situation, finding out that one of the nominees, Nainglin "ACE" Swe of Myanmar was a part of a certain brand that was the reason why Del Rosario and Villaluna were snubbed during the nomination. Del Rosario and Villaluna are part of a legal-betting website named "Rivalry". According to the Greatest Players Nominee criteria, the VeeWise tandem looked onto the final criteria, "Not included in illegal activities, including promotion or soliciting." Both Del Rosario and Villaluna addressed the situation with Moonton privately alongside getting Tier One Entertainment, the management of Blacklist International to step in and communicate with Moonton.

On November 9, Swe has officially announced his withdrawal from the nomination from the Greatest Players, citing that he did not match one of the criteria from the nomination. This also ends the rift between Myanmar fans and Filipino fans whom are divided in the situation. The nominations for Soriano, Del Rosario and Villaluna are still not included to negate unintended misunderstandings.

Awards and achievements
Preceded by ECHO Philippines	MLBB World Champion; AP Bren; The MLBB M5 World Champions	Succeeded by FNATIC ONIC Philippines
Preceded by Frederic Benedict "Bennyqt" Gonzales	MLBB Finals MVP; David "FlapTzy" Canon; The MLBB M5 Finals MVP	Succeeded by Grant "Kelra" Pilas
