= 2023 Mobile Legends: Bang Bang World Championship =

2023 Mobile Legends: Bang Bang World Championship could refer to:

- MLBB M4 World Championship held in January 2023
- MLBB M5 World Championship to be held in December 2023
