= MLBB M4 World Championship =

4th competition of Mobile Legends: Bang Bang World Championship

- 2023

Tournament information
- Sport: Mobile Legends: Bang Bang
- Dates: 1–15 January 2023
- Administrator: Moonton
- Tournament format(s): Group stage Single Round Robin Format; Playoffs; Double Elimination Format
- Host: Indonesia
- Venue: Bali United Studio
- Website: https://m4.mobilelegends.com/

Final positions
- Champion: ECHO Philippines
- 1st runner-up: Blacklist International
- 2nd runner-up: RRQ Hoshi
- MVP: Frederic "Bennyqt" Gonzales

The 2022 Mobile Legends: Bang Bang World Championship, commonly referred to as the M4 World Championship and M4, was the fourth edition of the Mobile Legends: Bang Bang World Championship, an esports tournament for the mobile game Mobile Legends: Bang Bang.

The annual international tournament was organized by the game developer Moonton, in partnership with several sponsors including the Ministry of Tourism and Creative Economy of the Republic of Indonesia. The tournament was held in Jakarta from 1 to 15 January 2023.

Sweeping the defending champions with a 4–0 score, ECHO Philippines defeated Blacklist International in a best-of-seven series to become the fourth World Champions. It marked the second Mobile Legends: Bang Bang World Championships where two Filipino teams are upper bracket and lower bracket contenders for the said title. It also marked the third consecutive world championship title that a Filipino team has won, beginning in M2.

Karl Gabriel "KarlTzy" Nepomuceno is the first-ever MLBB player who has won two world championships. He would be joined by his former teammates, Kyle "Phewww" Arcangel and David "FlapTzy" Canon to win two world championships after their victories in the MLBB M5 World Championship, as well as his opponent, Edward "Edward" Dapadap, after winning the recent MLBB M7 World Championship

== Background ==
The MLBB M4 World Championships was the fourth edition of the Mobile Legends: Bang Bang World Championship and the first edition of the games to be held in Indonesia. Previously, Malaysia and Singapore held the first three editions of the games, M1 in Kuala Lumpur and M2 and M3 in Singapore. The tournament was held from 1 to 15 January 2023, surpassing one year of the previous editions of the tournament.

M4 featured sixteen (16) qualified teams from Asia, North America, the Middle East and North Africa (MENA), Europe and Latin America. Teams qualified through their region's qualification method, whether it will be an MPL Region or a Moonton-approved qualification tournament.

A notable fact is that in every edition of the World Championship, an exclusive battle pass skin and the champion skin will be released. Previously, the Fighter-hero Roger was chosen to be the battle pass skin and the Champions Skin was Estes, picked by Blacklist International. In the current battle pass, the Marksman Hero Beatrix was chosen as the Battle pass skin.

== Qualified teams ==
Qualifying for the M4 World Championships comes from the competing nation's Mobile Legends: Bang Bang Professional League, commonly known as "MPL." However, regional qualifiers in the North America, Turkey, Myanmar, Mekong (Thailand, Laos, Vietnam), and Latin American regions were also held to broaden the reach of the Championship's teams.

Unlike in the previous MLBB World Championships, the Commonwealth of Independent States and Japan would not participate in the upcoming M4. On the other hand, Mekong and Myanmar will re-join after their absence in the M3 World Championship held in Singapore. The number of qualifiers for Singapore and Brazil has been reduced to one, while the Latin America region will now delegate two teams participating in the world championship.

Qualifiers
Region	League	Qualification method	Team name	ID	Group
Philippines	MPL Philippines	MPL Philippines Season 10 Champions	(Philippines) Blacklist International	BLCK	A
Philippines	MPL Philippines	MPL Philippines Season 10 Runners-Up	ECHO Philippines	ECHO	C
Indonesia	MPL Indonesia	MPL Indonesia Season 10 Champions	(Indonesia) ONIC Esports	ONIC	B
Indonesia	MPL Indonesia	MPL Indonesia Season 10 Runners-Up	(Indonesia) RRQ Hoshi	RRQ	C
Malaysia	MPL Malaysia	MPL Malaysia Season 10 Champions	(Malaysia) Team HAQ	THQ	D
Malaysia	MPL Malaysia	MPL Malaysia Season 10 Runners-Up	(Malaysia) Todak	TDK	B
Latin America	Super League LATAM	Super League LATAM Season 1 Champions	S11 Gaming Argentina	S11	D
Latin America	Super League LATAM	Super League LATAM Season 1 Runners-Up	Malvinas Gaming	MVG	B
Singapore	MPL Singapore	MPL Singapore Season 4 Champions	RSG Singapore	RSG	C
Cambodia	MPL Cambodia	MPL Cambodia Autumn Split 2022 Champions	(Cambodia) Burn x Team Flash	BURN	A
Brazil	MPL Brazil	MPL Brazil Season 3 Champions	(Brazil) RRQ Akira	RRQ	D
Middle East and North Africa	MPL MENA	MPL MENA Fall Split 2022 Champions	Occupy Thrones	OPY	C
Myanmar	M4 Myanmar Qualifiers	Myanmar Qualifying Team	(Myanmar) Falcon Esports	FCON	A
Mekong	M4 Mekong Qualifiers	Mekong Region Qualifying Team	(Vietnam) MDH Esports	MDH	B
Turkey	Türkiye Şampiyonası 2022	Turkish Qualifying Team	(Turkey) Incendio Supremacy	INC	A
North America	MLBB NACT	MLBB NACT Fall Season Champions	(United States) The Valley	TV	D

== Venue ==
The M4 World Championship was announced to be held in the capital city of Jakarta, Indonesia.

Previously, the group stages and playoffs will be held at XO Hall and Istora Senayan, but due to unforeseen circumstances and for the safety of fans, both venues were changed accordingly by the M4 organizers.

Group stages for the tournament will now be held at the Bali United Studio, Jakarta Indonesia. In addition, the knockout stages will be hosted at the Tennis Indoor Senayan. The selling of tickets for the event started on October 19.

== Marketing ==
During the build-up to the M4 World Championships, the MLBB official YouTube channel, alongside MPL Region YouTube channels such as the Philippines and Indonesia, has released several promotional and publicity videos to promote the upcoming world championships.

In the Philippines, the theme song "PINAS LANG MALAKAS", was released and was sung by KZ Tandingan, featuring Nik Makino. The song included the four prominent members of both qualifying teams of the Philippines, Danerie "Wise." Del Rosario and Jonmar "OhMyV33Nus" Villaluna of Blacklist International, and Karl Gabriel "KarlTzy" Nepomuceno and Tristan "YAWI" Cabrera of ECHO Philippines. The music video also featured Joshua "CH4KNU" Mangilog of Smart Omega and selected shoutcasters of MPL Philippines.

== Format ==
Group stage: 1 to 4 January 2023

- 16 teams qualified for the event are split into four groups of 4 teams each.
- All matches in the group stage are played in a Bo1 series.
- The top two teams per group qualified for the Upper Bracket Playoffs.
- The bottom two teams per group qualified for the Lower Bracket Playoffs.

Knockout stage (playoffs): 7 to 14 January 2023

- Sixteen teams play in a double-elimination tournament.
- Eight teams begin in the Upper Bracket, and eight teams begin in the Lower Bracket.
- Lower Bracket Rounds 1 and 2 are a Bo3 series. The rest of the playoffs are played in a Bo5 series.

Grand finals: 15 January 2023

- The grand finals will be a Bo7 series between the upper bracket and lower bracket finalists.

== Rosters ==
Official rosters of all qualified teams
Team	Players											Coach/manager
Team	Jungle		Exp Lane		Gold Lane			Midlaner		Roamer		Coach/manager
(Philippines) Blacklist International	(Philippines) Wise (Danerie James Del Rosario)		(Philippines) Edward (Edward Jay Dapadap)		(Philippines) Oheb (Kiel Calvin Soriano)			(Philippines) Hadji (Salic A. Imam)	(Philippines) Eson (Mark Jayson Gerardo)	(Philippines) OhMyV33Nus (Johnmar Villaluna)	(Philippines) DexStar (Dexstar Louise Alaba)	(Philippines) BON CHAN (Kristoffer Ed L. Ricaplaza)
Echo Philippines	(Philippines) KarlTzy (Karl Gabriel Nepomuceno)		(Philippines) SanFord (Sanford Vinuya)		(Philippines) Bennyqt (Frederic Benedict Gonzales)			(Philippines) Sanji (Alston Pabico)	(Philippines) KurtTzy (Jankurt Matira)	(Philippines) Yawi (Tristan Cabrera)	(Philippines) Jaypee (Jaypee Cruz)	(Philippines) Tictac (Harold Reyes)
(Indonesia) ONIC Esports	(Philippines) Kairi (Kairi Rayodelsol)		(Indonesia) Butsss (Muhammad Satrya Sanubari)		(Indonesia) CW (Calvin Winata)			(Indonesia) Sanz (Gilang)	(Indonesia) Drian (Adriand Larsen Wong)	(Indonesia) Kiboy (Nicky Fernando)	(Indonesia) Samoht (Thomas Obadja)	(Indonesia) Aldo (Ronaldo Liebert)
(Indonesia) RRQ Hoshi	(Indonesia) Alberttt (Albert Iskandar)		(Indonesia) R7 (Rivaldi Fatah)	(Indonesia) Banana (Andre Putra)	(Indonesia) Skylar (Schevenko Tendean)			(Indonesia) Clayyy (Deden Nurhasan)	(Indonesia) Lemon (Muhammad Ikhsan)	(Indonesia) Vyn (Calvin)		(Philippines) Arcadia (Michael Bocado)
(Malaysia) Team HAQ	(Malaysia) Garyy (Muhammad Syafizan Najmi)		(Malaysia) Lolla (Mohamad Nilzaihan bin Neilham)		(Malaysia) Panda (Poh Chun Wai)			(Malaysia) Mann (Aiman Anuar bin Zairie)	(Malaysia) Syamskyyy (Muhammad Qamarul Hisyam bin Shukri)	(Malaysia) Minn (Aimin Anuar bin Zairie)		(Malaysia) Pabz (Khairul Azman bin Mohd Sharif)
(Malaysia) Todak	(Malaysia) Rival (Muhammad Alif Akmal bin Kamarulzaman)	(Malaysia) CikuGais (Muhammad Danial bin Mohamad Fuad)	(Malaysia) 4Meyz (Wan Usman bin Wan Imran)		(Malaysia) Momo (Idreen bin Abdul Jamal)			(Malaysia) Moon (Zikry bin Shamsuddin)		(Malaysia) Yums (Muhammad Qayyum Ariffin bin Mohd Suhairi)		(Singapore) Amoux (Ariff Iswandi)
S11 Gaming Argentina	(Argentina) Jotun (Diego Balog)		(Argentina) Papadog (Alexander Llanos)		(Argentina) Kaii (Martias Roldan)	(Argentina) Mael (Gonzalo Leguizamon)		(Chile) Chan (Darien Barraza)		(Argentina) Erwin (Rodrigo Herenu)		(Brazil) Secretaria (Bárbara Gottardo)
Malvinas Gaming	Fran (Fran Solís)		Dragon (Alexander Sullon)		JoelCrew (Joel Huarino)			Harle (George Campos)		Stephe (José Machaca)	Soujin (Gian Franco)	(Brazil) Tsubasaa (Walaci Seabra)
RSG Singapore	(Singapore) Brayyy (Brayden Teo)		(Singapore) Diablo (Yeo Lun)		(Singapore) Babycakes (Jovan Heng)			(Singapore) 505 (Amos Rui)	(Singapore) Roy. (Royven Tan)	(Singapore) Lolsie (Bellamy Yeov)	(Singapore) CS (Yong Chester)	(Indonesia) SaintDeLucaz (Dolly Pelo)
(Cambodia) Burn x Team Flash	(Cambodia) Chma (Sour Mara)	(Cambodia) Xeon (Kunn Chankakada)	(Cambodia) ATM (Kosal Piseth)		(Philippines) Hesa (Jhonwin Vergara)	(Cambodia) Fury (Vithou Sovisal)		(Cambodia) C Cat (Sok Roth)		(Cambodia) D7 (Ty Oudom)		(Philippines) Zico (John Dizon)
(Brazil) RRQ Akira	(Brazil) Kiing (Lucas Godoy)	(Brazil) Blink (Gabriel Favoreto)	(Brazil) Tekashi (Arthur Nascimento)		(Brazil) Gustalagusta (Gustavo Lima)			(Brazil) Seigen (Matheus Lima)		(Brazil) Luiizz (Luiz Henrique Alves)		(Brazil) Cabral (Godman Campos Dos Santos)
Occupy Thrones	(Egypt) Lio (Mustafa Mahmoud)		(Saudi Arabia) Hulk (Abdulaziz Sulaimani)	(Egypt) Wega (Mohmed Wageeh)	(Egypt) Gado (Ahmed Gado)			(Saudi Arabia) Fury (Naif Alslobi)		(Egypt) Maro (Amr Khaled)		~~(Ukraine) WarBarbie (Alexander Korystin)~~^{1} (Philippines) Mundo (Ameniel Del Mundo)
(Myanmar) Falcon Esports	(Myanmar) Kenn (Kenneth Hein)		(Myanmar) Yellowflash (Min Khant Hein)		(Myanmar) Silent (Pyae Sone)	(Myanmar) Zippx (Kyaw Bo)	(Myanmar) RubyDD (Swan Aung)	(Myanmar) JustiN (Pyae Khant)		(Myanmar) Naomi (Min Ko)		(Philippines) Dale (Steve Vitug)
(Vietnam) MDH Esports	(Vietnam) Jowga (Nguyễn Văn Tô Đô)		(Vietnam) TheKing (Nguyễn Việt Thanh)		(Vietnam) Hehehehehehe (Lâm Văn Đạt)			(Vietnam) NeedMyHelp (Lê Minh Đức)		(Vietnam) Gnart (Phạm Ngọc Trạng)		(Vietnam) tntk
(Turkey) Incendio Supremacy	(Turkey) Tienzy (Sidar Menteşe)		(Turkey) Alien (Bariş Ali Çakir)	(Turkey) Lunar (Mehmet Ilgun)	(Turkey) Sunshine (Emre Sari)			(Turkey) Rosa (Ahmet Batir)		(Turkey) Apex47 (Furkan Akbulut)		(Turkey) Paranoid (Osman Karademir)
(United States) The Valley	(United States) MobaZane (Michael Cosgun)		(United States) FwydChickn (Ian Hohl)	(Philippines) Mielow (Chris Enobio)	(Philippines) Basic (Peter Bryce Lozano)			(South Korea) Hoon (Jang Seong-hun)		(United States) Shark (Oscar Vo)		(Philippines) Balot

Notes
1. Alexander "WarBarbie" Korystin from Ukraine, couldn't flight to Indonesia due to the Russian invasion of Ukraine. Therefore, he is replaced as a coach by Ameniel Del Mundo from Philippines.

The Rosters for the MLBB M4 World Championships were a first with the majority of the players being Filipino or playing for the Philippines initially such as Kairi Rayosdelsol and Michael Bocado from Indonesia.

=== Broadcast talents ===
The following is the official talent line-up for the M4 broadcast in Jakarta, Indonesia:

Philippines	Indonesia	Malaysia	Singapore	United States
Mara (Mara Aquino)	Mirko (Frederick Handy Loho)	GideonQ (Gideon Khew Wei Yung)	Jayz (Chris Yeo)	Assassin Dave (Dave Mao)
Mara (Mara Aquino)	Aeterna (Rachael Melati)	GideonQ (Gideon Khew Wei Yung)	Jayz (Chris Yeo)	Assassin Dave (Dave Mao)
Wolf (Caisam Yvez Nopueto)	Aeterna (Rachael Melati)	GideonQ (Gideon Khew Wei Yung)	Jayz (Chris Yeo)	Assassin Dave (Dave Mao)
Leo (Dan Cubangay)	Gonie (Albert Serafin)	Laphel (Mohd Amirul Aiman Mohammad Kamal)	Jayz (Chris Yeo)	Assassin Dave (Dave Mao)
Naisou (Joseph Charles Rezabek)	Arashi (Brydon Maslimta)	Laphel (Mohd Amirul Aiman Mohammad Kamal)	Jayz (Chris Yeo)	Trex (H.B. Wagner)
Naisou (Joseph Charles Rezabek)	Clara (Clara Kartika Sari Utoyo)	Laphel (Mohd Amirul Aiman Mohammad Kamal)	Jayz (Chris Yeo)	Trex (H.B. Wagner)

=== Group draw ===
The group draw was held on 8 December 2022. The sixteen teams that qualified for the global tournament were split into two pools and grouped into 4 groups of 4 teams each. The following were the rules for the group draw:

- Teams from the same qualified region will not be drawn into the same group, if that happens the later team will be slotted into the next group.
- Teams in Pool 1 will not be drawn into the same group, 2 teams from MLSL in Pool 2 will not be drawn into the same group.
- The order of the draw is serpentine (ABCD-DCBA-ABCD-DCBA).

Group Draw Pools
Pool 1	Pool 2		
(Philippines) Blacklist International	ECHO Philippines	(Brazil) RRQ Akira	(Myanmar) Falcon Esports
(Indonesia) ONIC Esports	(Indonesia) RRQ Hoshi	Occupy Thrones	(Vietnam) MDH Esports
(Malaysia) Team HAQ	(Malaysia) Todak	S11 Gaming Argentina	(Turkey) Incendio Supremacy
RSG Singapore	(Cambodia) Burn x Team Flash	Malvinas Gaming	(United States) The Valley

Group Draw on 8 December 2022
Group A	Group B	Group C	Group D
(Philippines) Blacklist International	(Indonesia) ONIC Esports	RSG Singapore	(Malaysia) Team HAQ
(Turkey) Incendio Supremacy	(Malaysia) Todak	Occupy Thrones	(Brazil) RRQ Akira
(Myanmar) Falcon Esports	Malvinas Gaming	(Indonesia) RRQ Hoshi	(United States) The Valley
(Cambodia) Burn x Flash	(Vietnam) MDH Esports	ECHO Philippines	S11 Gaming Argentina

== Group stage ==
The group stages started on 1 January and concluded on 4 January. All games in the group stage will be in a Bo1 format. There will be no teams eliminated at the end of group stages, but the upper two teams in each group shall be qualified for the Upper Bracket playoffs, while the lower two shall be qualified for the Lower Bracket Playoffs.

=== Group A ===
Pos	Team	Pld	W	L	GF	GA	GD	Pts	Qualification	(Myanmar) FCON	(Philippines) BLCK	(Turkey) INC	(Cambodia) BURN
1	(Myanmar) Falcon Esports (Q)	5	4	1	4	1	+3	9	Qualified for Upper Bracket Playoffs	—	1–0	0–1	1–0
2	(Philippines) Blacklist International (Q)	5	3	2	3	2	+1	8	Qualified for Upper Bracket Playoffs	0–1	—	1–0	1–0
3	(Turkey) Incendio Supremacy (Q)	5	2	3	2	3	−1	7	Qualified for Lower Bracket Playoffs	1–0	0–1	—	1–0
4	(Cambodia) Burn x Flash (Q)	3	0	3	0	3	−3	3	Qualified for Lower Bracket Playoffs	0–1	0–1	0–1	—

(Q) Qualified for the phase indicated

Date	Game	Team 1	Result		Team 2
1 January 2023	1	BLCK	1	0	INC
1 January 2023	2	INC	1	0	FCON
1 January 2023	3	FCON	1	0	BURN
3 January 2023	4	INC	1	0	BURN
3 January 2023	5	BURN	0	1	BLCK
3 January 2023	6	FCON	1	0	BLCK

=== Tiebreaker ===
A three-way tie emerged between Incendio, Blacklist, and Falcon Esports each having a 2–1 win-loss standing. With this, three additional tiebreaker games were played after the final group stage game was held to determine the teams that would make the upper and the lower bracket. These tiebreaker matches were counted in the standings as per the official website.

==== Results ====
Tiebreaker Match	Team 1	Result		Team 2
1	(Myanmar) FCON	1	0	(Turkey) INC
2	(Philippines) BLCK	0	1	(Myanmar) FCON
3	(Philippines) BLCK	1	0	(Turkey) INC

=== Group B ===
Pos	Team	Pld	W	L	GF	GA	GD	Pts	Qualification	(Malaysia) TDK	(Indonesia) ONIC	(Peru) MVG	(Vietnam) MDH
1	(Malaysia) Todak (Q)	3	3	0	3	0	+3	6	Qualified for Upper Bracket Playoffs	—	1–0	1–0	1–0
2	(Indonesia) ONIC Esports (Q)	3	2	1	2	1	+1	5	Qualified for Upper Bracket Playoffs	0–1	—	1–0	1–0
3	(Peru) Malvinas Gaming (Q)	3	1	2	1	2	−1	4	Qualified for Lower Bracket Playoffs	0–1	0–1	—	1–0
4	(Vietnam) MDH Esports (Q)	3	0	3	0	3	−3	3	Qualified for Lower Bracket Playoffs	0–1	0–1	0–1	—

(Q) Qualified for the phase indicated

Date	Game	Team 1	Result		Team 2
1 January 2023	1	MVG	1	0	MDH
1 January 2023	2	TDK	1	0	MVG
1 January 2023	3	ONIC	0	1	TDK
3 January 2023	4	MVG	0	1	ONIC
3 January 2023	5	MDH	0	1	ONIC
3 January 2023	6	TDK	1	0	MDH

=== Group C ===
Pos	Team	Pld	W	L	GF	GA	GD	Pts	Qualification	(Philippines) ECHO	(Indonesia) RRQ	(Singapore) RSG SG	OPY
1	ECHO Philippines (Q)	3	3	0	3	0	+3	6	Qualified for Upper Bracket Playoffs	—	1–0	1–0	1–0
2	(Indonesia) RRQ Hoshi (Q)	3	2	1	2	1	+1	5	Qualified for Upper Bracket Playoffs	0–1	—	1–0	1–0
3	RSG Singapore (Q)	3	1	2	1	2	−1	4	Qualified for Lower Bracket Playoffs	0–1	0–1	—	1–0
4	Occupy Thrones (Q)	3	0	3	0	3	−3	3	Qualified for Lower Bracket Playoffs	0–1	0–1	0–1	—

First match(es) will be played: 1st January 2023. Source:
(Q) Qualified for the phase indicated

Date	Game	Team 1	Result		Team 2
2 January 2023	1	RSG-SG	1	0	OPY
2 January 2023	2	RRQ	1	0	OPY
2 January 2023	3	ECHO	1	0	RRQ
4 January 2023	4	OPY	0	1	ECHO
4 January 2023	5	ECHO	1	0	RSG-SG
4 January 2023	6	RRQ	1	0	RSG-SG

=== Group D ===
Pos	Team	Pld	W	L	GF	GA	GD	Pts	Qualification	(Brazil) RRQ-BR	(Malaysia) THQ	(Malaysia) TV	(Argentina) S11
1	(Brazil) RRQ Akira (Q)	3	2	1	2	1	+1	5	Qualified for Upper Bracket Playoffs	—	1–0	1–0	0–1
2	(Malaysia) Team HAQ (Q)	3	2	1	2	1	+1	5	Qualified for Upper Bracket Playoffs	0–1	—	1–0	1–0
3	(United States) The Valley (Q)	3	1	2	1	2	−1	4	Qualified for Lower Bracket Playoffs	0–1	0–1	—	1–0
4	S11 Gaming Argentina (Q)	3	1	2	1	2	−1	4	Qualified for Lower Bracket Playoffs	1–0	0–1	0–1	—

First match(es) will be played: 1 January 2023. Source:
(Q) Qualified for the phase indicated

Date	Game	Team 1	Result		Team 2
2 January 2023	1	TV	1	0	S11
2 January 2023	2	RRQ-BR	1	0	TV
2 January 2023	3	THQ	0	1	RRQ-BR
4 January 2023	4	RRQ-BR	0	1	S11
4 January 2023	5	S11	0	1	THQ
4 January 2023	6	TV	0	1	THQ

Game Schedule Reference:

== Playoff Bracket ==
M4 featured the same bracketing strategy from the previous MLBB M3 World Championship format, a sixteen-team double-elimination bracketing system wherein the teams will be split into four groups. In these four groups, a round-robin format proceeded to determine which two teams would be qualifying either to the upper bracket or lower bracket. The first two rounds of the lower bracket were a best-of-3 series, the rest of the matches were a best-of-5 series, except for the Grand Final, which were a best-of-7 championship series.

Upper Bracket Quarterfinals; Best of 5	Upper Bracket Semifinals; Best of 5	Upper Bracket Finals; Best of 5	Grand Finals; Best of 7
Match 1 (7 January)
A1	(Myanmar) Falcon Esports	0
B2	(Indonesia) ONIC Esports	3
Match 16 (12 January)
B2	(Indonesia) ONIC Esports	1
C1	ECHO Philippines	3
Match 2 (7 January)
C1	ECHO Philippines	3
D2	(Malaysia) Team HAQ	2
Match 19 (13 January)
C1	ECHO Philippines	2
A2	(Philippines) Blacklist International	3
Match 3 (8 January)
C1	(Malaysia) Todak	0
D2	(Indonesia) RRQ Hoshi	3
Match 14 (11 January)
D2	(Indonesia) RRQ Hoshi	2
A2	(Philippines) Blacklist International	3
Match 4 (8 January)	Match 22 (15 January)
D1	(Brazil) RRQ Akira	1	A2	(Philippines) Blacklist International	0
A2	(Philippines) Blacklist International	3	C1	ECHO Philippines	4
Lower Bracket Round 1 Best of 3	Lower Bracket Round 2 Best of 3	Lower Bracket Round 3 Best of 5	Lower Bracket Quarterfinals; Best of 5	Lower Bracket Semifinals; Best of 5	Lower Bracket Finals; Best of 5
Match 9 (10 January)
Match 17 (13 January)
Match 5 (9 January)	A1	(Myanmar) Falcon Esports	2
Match 13 (11 January)	D2	(Indonesia) RRQ Hoshi	3
G4	RSG Singapore	0	D4	S11 Argentina	0
A1	(Myanmar) Falcon Esports	3	A1	(Myanmar) Falcon Esports	2	Match 21 (14 January)
D4	S11 Argentina	2	Match 10 (10 January)
A3	(Turkey) Incendio Supremacy	2	Match 20 (14 January)	C1	ECHO Philippines	3
Match 6 (9 January)	D2	(Malaysia) Team HAQ	1
D2	(Indonesia) RRQ Hoshi	3	D2	(Indonesia) RRQ Hoshi	1
A3	(Turkey) Incendio Supremacy	2	A3	(Turkey) Incendio Supremacy	2
B2	(Indonesia) ONIC Esports	0
D4	(Vietnam) MDH Esports	0	Match 11 (10 January)
Match 18 (13 January)
Match 7 (9 January)	C1	(Malaysia) Todak	0
Match 15 (12 January)	B2	(Indonesia) ONIC Esports	3
D3	(United States) The Valley	2	D3	(United States) The Valley	2
D3	(United States) The Valley	3	D3	(United States) The Valley	1
A4	(Cambodia) Burn X Flash	0	Match 12 (10 January)
D1	(Brazil) RRQ Akira	1
Match 8 (9 January)	D1	(Brazil) RRQ Akira	2
B3	(Peru) Malvinas Gaming	0	C3	(Saudi Arabia) Occupy Thrones	0
C3	(Saudi Arabia) Occupy Thrones	2

== Awards ==
Announced in the official M4 Press Conference & Group Draw Ceremony on YouTube, UBS Gold, an Indonesian-based Jewelry retailer and manufacturer, announced the partnership with M4 to create the very first MLBB World Championship Ring made out of solid gold. This will be the first Championship ring presented to the Mobile Legends: Bang Bang World Championship champion.

- (NEW) World Championship Ring (Exclusive design for M4)
- The MLBB World Championship Plaque / Trophy
- MLBB M4 Gold Medal for Each Player and Coach/Manager
- MLBB M4 Finals MVP - (Philippines) Bennyqt (Frederic Benedict Gonzales)
- MLBB M4 Fans Choice Award - (Indonesia) RRQ Hoshi

== Marketing ==
=== Branding ===
The announcement of the venue of the M4 World Championship was made on 25 August 2022, when the Mobile Legends: Bang Bang official YouTube channel released the Host City announcement where Jakarta was chosen to host the fourth iteration of the tournament. However, it would take until 7 December 2022, when the Mobile Legends: Bang Bang social media accounts were to begin to hype up the upcoming world tournament.

On 5 December 2022, Moonton confirmed that M4 will be held in Indonesia and the tournament is set to follow its original schedule with the release of the official trailer on YouTube.

==== M4 Pass ====
On 16 December 2022, Moonton announced that the Marksman Hero Beatrix will be receiving this edition's special M4 Pass Skin. The M4 Pass is a in-game pass that gives players rewards and incentives while doing Daily Tasks and Challenges. The M4 Pass included custom M4 effects such as Recall Animations, Kill Animations, a Trail Animation for the Hero, Limited Edition Skins and in-game rewards that can be used to unlock more rewards.

Upon purchasing any M4 Pass, Beatrix's "Light Chaser" Skin would be attained by every person who purchases it while its prime skin "Stellar Brilliance" can be attained once the player's M4 pass reaches Level 75. The M4 Pass was officially made to be available on 20 December.

==== Theme Song ====
On 18 December 2022, the teaser for this year's M4 was released. Eventually, on 24 December 2022, "Dare To Be Great" was released as the official song of the tournament. Three days later, the official music video was released featuring players from the 16 qualified teams and rosters of the tournament.

=== Sponsors ===
The M4 World Championships oversees regional partners from different countries to get the chance to stream the tournament in the participating countries and also worldwide.

Company name	Classification	Country/Region of Partnership
TikTok	Official Content Partner	Indonesia; Singapore; Philippines; Malaysia; Cambodia; Latin America
Esports Charts	Official Analytical Partner	Indonesia; Singapore; Philippines; Malaysia; Cambodia; Latin America
Gank	Official Peripheral Partner	Indonesia; Singapore; Philippines; Malaysia; Cambodia; Latin America
Secretlab	Official Gaming Chairs	Indonesia; Singapore; Philippines; Malaysia; Cambodia; Latin America
meWatch	Official Regional Media Partner	Singapore
Infinix	Official Regional Smartphone	Indonesia
UBS Gold	Official Gold Partner	Indonesia
Axis	Partner in Esports	Indonesia
Grab	Partner in Esports	Indonesia
Vidio	Broadcast Partner	Indonesia
Smart	Official Regional Telecommunications Partner	Philippines
Samsung	Official Regional Mobile Partner	Philippines
Grab	Partner in Esports	Philippines
Maya	Partner in Esports	Philippines
iWantTFC	Digital Media Partner	Philippines
Hotlink	Official Regional Mobile Gaming Internet Partner	Malaysia
EGG Network	Media Partner	Malaysia
Metfone	Official Regional Telecommunications Partner	Cambodia

== Broadcasting rights ==
The M4 World Championships is available to be streamed and watched on YouTube on the official Mobile Legends: Bang Bang Channel and the official MPL Regional Channels with their languages.

On 26 December 2022, Moonton announced that it has partnered with ABS-CBN, the largest network in the Philippines to broadcast the Mobile Legends: Bang Bang World Championships on Cable TV and on its social media channels in the Philippines.

== Results ==
Place	Team	Prize Pool
Champions	ECHO Philippines	$300,000
Runner-up	(Philippines) Blacklist International	$120,000
3rd Place	(Indonesia) RRQ Hoshi	$80,000
4th Place	(Indonesia) ONIC Esports	$55,000
5th - 6th	(Myanmar) Falcon Esports	$40,000
5th - 6th	(United States) The Valley	$40,000
7th - 8th	(Turkey) Incendio Supremacy	$30,000
7th - 8th	(Brazil) RRQ Akira	$30,000
9th - 12th	S11 Gaming Argentina	$15,000
9th - 12th	(Malaysia) Team HAQ	$15,000
9th - 12th	(Malaysia) Todak	$15,000
9th - 12th	Occupy Thrones	$15,000
13th - 16th	RSG Singapore	$10,000
13th - 16th	(Vietnam) MDH Esports	$10,000
13th - 16th	(Cambodia) Burn x Flash	$10,000
13th - 16th	(Peru) Malvinas Gaming	$10,000

== Notes ==
After the opening ceremony of the MLBB M4 World Championship Grand Finals, the host for the upcoming MLBB M5 World Championship was announced alongside the MLBB calendar of events to occur in 2023 and it will be held in the Philippines, with Abraham Tolentino, the President of the Philippine Olympic Committee confirming the Philippines' affirmation to hold the tournament.

Awards and achievements
Preceded by Blacklist International	MLBB World Champion; ECHO Philippines; The MLBB M4 World Champions	Succeeded by AP Bren
Preceded by Kiel Calvin "OHEB" Soriano	MLBB Finals MVP; Frederic "Bennyqt" Gonzales; The MLBB M4 Finals MVP	Succeeded by David "FlapTzy" Canon
