= Esports at the 2025 SEA Games – Mobile Legends men's team tournament =

Esports event at the SEA Games

Mobile Legends: Bang Bang at the 2025 SEA Games
- Venue: Chulalongkorn University
- Dates: 12–17 December
- Nations: 8

Medalists
gold medal	Philippines (PHI)
silver medal	Malaysia (MAS)
bronze medal	Indonesia (INA)

The Mobile Legends: Bang Bang tournament for the 2025 SEA Games was held from December 12 to December 17 at Sala Phra Kieo, Chulalongkorn University in Bangkok, Thailand. This was the fourth iteration of the men's MLBB tournament in the Southeast Asian Games since its inception in 2019.

The tournament reverted to a single bronze medal placement with both losing semifinals team having to play a third-place match. The tournament featured a single round robin tournament with two drawn groups. Each team played a best-of-five series with the top seeded team in each group receiving an outright semifinals bye.

The Philippines won their fourth consecutive gold medal after beating Malaysia 4–0 in the final. Team Indonesia returns to the podium receiving the bronze medal.

== Participating teams ==
A total of eight nations participated in the Mobile Legends: Bang Bang Tournament after Cambodia's withdrawal from the 2025 SEA Games.

- ~~Cambodia~~ ~~(CAM)~~
- Indonesia (INA)
- Laos (LAO)
- Malaysia (MAS)
- Myanmar (MYA)
- Philippines (PHI)
- Singapore (SGP)
- Thailand (TLS)
- Timor Leste (TLS)
- Vietnam (VIE)

=== Squads ===
Cambodia (DQ)	Indonesia	Laos	Malaysia	Myanmar
Chhuon Phengkong; Khoun Amey; Nhem Chandavan; Vann Dane; Sok Viera; Cheang Piseth	Aldhia Fahmi Aranda; Yonathan Chin; Yehezkiel Wiseman Hamonangan Napitu; Leonardo Prasetyo Agung; Christian Widy Wardhana Hartono; Riski	Phoutthavan Pheungpasomxay; Sitthidet Inthanouvong; Aphisith Inmixay; Thatthasone Vongphouthong; Somchay Thesavathdee; Mangkonethong Sinbandit	Muhammad Haqqullah Bin Ahmad Shahrul Zaman; Hazziq Danish Bin Mohamad Rizwan; Muhammad Qayyum Ariffin Bin Mohd Suhairi; Ealtond Rayner; Muhammad Danish Fitri Bin Razman; Idreen Bin Abdul Jamal	Arkar Bhone Pyae; Kaung Satt; Min Kon Swan; Shine Lin Aung; Ye Htet Si Thu; Khit Thit
Philippines	Singapore	Thailand	Timor-Leste	Vietnam
Sanford Marin Vinuya; Karl Nepomuceno; Alston Pabico; Kiel Soriano; Jaypee Gonzales Dela Cruz; John Carlo Roma	Yeo Wee Lun; Brayden Teo; Aaron Ng Jia Le; Keith Lim Wei Jun; Jay Chung Jun Wen	Chaiyakrit Buangern; Piya Sriwilat; Naruebet Janjaroen; Thakdanai Khampan; Sivarin; Piyanat	Francelino Nobel Gusmao; Leonisio Leong Amaral; Francisco Xavier Lema; Avelardo Gusmao De Oliveira; Domingos Maria Lopes; Claudio Monteiro Do Carmo; Excel Mahabaratha Monteiro	Nguyễn Đức Nam; Nguyễn Văn Tô Đô; Đinh Quang Nguyên; Nguyễn Việt Anh; Phạm Ngọc Trạng; Lâm Văn Đạt

== Results ==
=== Group Stage ===
==== Group A ====
Pos	Team	Pld	W	D	L	GF	GA	GD	Pts	Qualification or relegation
1	Myanmar	3	3	0	0	6	0	+6	6	Semifinals
2	Vietnam	3	2	0	1	4	2	+2	4	Quarterfinals
3	Thailand	3	1	0	2	2	4	−2	2	Quarterfinals
4	Timor–Leste	3	0	0	3	0	6	−6	0	
5	Cambodia	0	0	0	0	0	0	0	0	Withdrew

Source: Gosu Gamers

==== Group B ====
Pos	Team	Pld	W	D	L	GF	GA	GD	Pts	Qualification or relegation
1	Philippines	4	4	0	0	8	0	+8	8	Semifinals
2	Malaysia	4	2	1	1	6	2	+4	5	Quarterfinals
3	Indonesia	4	2	0	2	4	4	0	4	Quarterfinals
4	Singapore	4	0	2	2	2	6	−4	2	
5	Laos	4	0	1	3	1	7	−6	1	

Source: Gosu Gamers

=== Playoff bracket ===
Quarterfinals
A2	Vietnam	1
B3	Indonesia	3
B2	Malaysia	3
A3	Thailand	0

Semifinals
B1	Philippines	3
B3	Indonesia	1
A1	Myanmar	1
B2	Malaysia	3

Grand Finals
B1	Philippines	4
B2	Malaysia	0
Bronze Medal Match
B3	Indonesia	3
A1	Myanmar	1
