= Oheb =

Filipino esports player (born 2004)

Personal information
- Name: Kiel Calvin Q. Soriano
- Nickname: The Filipino Sniper
- Born: August 17, 2004 (age 22)
- Nationality: Filipino

Career information
- Games: Mobile Legends: Bang Bang
- Playing career: 2020–2026
- Role: Gold Laner

Team history
- 2020–2025: Blacklist International
- 2025–2026: Team Liquid PH

Career highlights and awards
- MLBB World Championship (M3); 5x MPL Philippines champion (S7, S8, S10, S15, S16); MPL Philippines Regular Season MVP (S7); 1x SEA Games Gold Medalist (2025)
Medal record
Esports
Representing Philippines
Southeast Asian Games
Gold medal – first place	2025 Thailand	MLBB – Men's team

Kiel Calvin Q. Soriano, professionally known as Oheb (stylized in all caps), is a Filipino Mobile Legends: Bang Bang player who was part of Blacklist International and later Team Liquid PH. Oheb won the MLBB M3 World Championship in 2021 with Blacklist, where he was also named as the Most Valuable Player.

== Early life ==
Kiel Calvin Q. Soriano was born on August 17, 2004. He took up Mobile Legends: Bang Bang (MLBB) after he was convinced by his aunt's boyfriend. He originally played League of Legends casually with friends.

He joined in his first MLBB tournament in 2019 and later joined more competitions in his home province of Tarlac. His mother was initially skeptical of his activities in gaming. At age 16, Soriano ran away from his home to Manila to pursue a career in esports.

== Career ==
Kiel Soriano who would later be known by his handle Oheb, passed the try-outs for the now-defunct Amihan Esports. He joined an amateur team during the COVID-19 pandemic and kept on training until he was scouted by a professional team.

=== Blacklist International ===
Oheb joined Blacklist International in 2020 and took up the role of Gold Laner. Blacklist was initially skeptical of hiring Oheb, but coach Dexstar Alaba vouched for his inclusion.

He had his rookie season in the MPL Philippines in Season 7 in 2021, where Blacklist won their first local title.

Oheb became known as part of the trio dubbed by fans as "MV3" with Salic "Hadji" Imam and Edward "Edward" Dapadap in Season 8 later that year. He also began developing a "bad boy" reputation. The player was fined and suspended for two games mid-season for flashing the middle finger during a match for which he immediately apologized for.

At the MLBB M3 World Championship in December 2021, Blacklist won the tournament with Oheb named as the Most Valuable Player. He earned the moniker "The Filipino Sniper" for his run.

Blacklist disbanded at the start of 2025 leaving Oheb without a team. He won a total of three MPL Philippines with Blacklist.

=== Team Liquid PH ===
Oheb initially considered following his old teammates after Blacklist disbanded. But was advised by his teammates and his former coach to go beyond his "comfort zone". He approached Blacklist's rival Team Liquid PH and pledged the management he would be abandoning his "immaturity". By February 2025, Team Liquid has signed Oheb.

He helped Team Liquid win the MPL Philippines Seasons 15 and 16 and the Mid-Season Cup (MSC) at the 2025 Esports World Cup.

After Liquid's M7 World Championship run, Oheb was placed under "inactive' status by Team Liquid on February 24, 2026, and the next day announced Aeronnshikii as his replacement for MPL Philippines Season 17.

On February 25, Oheb shared a statement from Calleja Law which disclosed he has submitted a formal resignation from Team Liquid on February 6 and that the allegations that there was a lack of communications over his departure is false. On March 9, Oheb announced his taking a break from professional esports.

=== Transition from MLBB to Honor of Kings ===
On March 21, 2026, Oheb has reportedly switched to Honor of Kings. The immediate focus is Oheb's integration into the game and its community with no plans to join a team for competitive play confirmed at the moment.

However, on March 27, Team Liquid announced they are pursuing legal actions against Oheb for breach of contract alleging they were only informed of Oheb's intent to leave the team in early February leaving the team only five days to find a replacement for their campaign in the MPL Philippines Season 18.

== National team ==
Oheb played for the Philippine national team or Sibol at the 2025 SEA Games in Thailand. The team won a gold medal at the MLBB men's team event.
