= V33Wise =

Filipino esports player duo

Personal information
- Name: Johnmar Villaluna; Danerie James Rosario
- Nickname(s): OhMyV33NUS (Villaluna); Wise (Rosario)
- Nationality: Filipino

Career information
- Game: Mobile Legends: Bang Bang
- Playing career: 2019–2023
- Role(s): Mid-lane / Roamer (OhMyV33NUS); Jungler (Wise)

Team history
- 2019–2020: ONIC Philippines
- 2020–2024: Blacklist International

Career highlights and awards
- MPL Philippines Regular Season MVP (S10 – OhMyV33NUS); 2x MPL Philippines Team of the Season (S8, S10); MLBB World Championship (M3); 3x MPL Philippines champions (S7, S8, S10); 1x Southeast Asian Games Gold Medalist (2021); 1x IESF World Tournament Silver Medalist (2022); 2x Runner-up MLBB Southeast Asia Cup Singapore (2021) Cambodia (2023); M4 Championship Runner-up
Medal record
Esports
Representing Philippines
SEA Games
Gold medal – first place	2021 Hanoi	MLBB

Johnmar Villaluna and Danerie James Rosario who are professionally known as OhMyV33Nus (Note: pronounced "Oh My Venus") and Wise are the members of the Filipino esports duo, V33Wise. (Note: sometimes written as "VeeWise") The pair has played Mobile Legends: Bang Bang and were part of ONIC Philippines and Blacklist International.

== Career ==
=== Esports ===
The V33Wise duo has been playing together the mobile game Mobile Legends: Bang Bang (MLBB) since 2019. It consists of Johnmar Villaluna ("OhMyV33Nus") and Danerie James Rosario ("Wise"). OhMyV33Nus is a mid laner and a roamer while Wise is a utility jungler.

Originally a League of Legends (LoL) player, OhMyV33Nus took up MLBB in 2019 following the conclusion of MPL Philippines (MPL PH) Season 3. He has previously competed with friends in LoL in inter-barangay competitions.

OhMyV33Nus and Wise first became teammates with the amateur team Dream High. They were brought together by Gerald "Dlar" Trinchera, their mutual friend. As part of Dream High they competed in MLBB competitions across Luzon. Dream High was later absorbed by the professional team, ONIC Philippines.

==== ONIC PH ====
Wise and OhMyV33Nus were part of Onic Philippines rise in the esports scene, finishing as runners-up in MPL PH Seasons 4 and 5 V33Wise were released from ONIC in November 2020 after a dismal fourth place finish in Season 6. The duo considers this as the lowest point of their careers with OhMyV33Nus having to adjust to play on a mobile phone after being allowed to play on a tablet in Seasons 4 and 5.

==== Blacklist International ====
In November 2020, Blacklist International signed in V33Wise ahead of MPL PH Season 7 next year.

They won the franchise and their own's first MPL PH title by defeating Execration in the final in the tournament. They defended their title in Season 8. The duo helped Blacklist finished as runners-up at the 2021 MLBB Southeast Asia Cup and December of the same year win the MLBB M3 World Championship.

They sat out the Season 9 which was held in early 2022. V33Wise however took part in the 31st SEA Games in Vietnam in May. Blacklist formed the core of the Philippines national MLBB team which won a gold medal in the regional games. They return to MPL PH for Season 10 in October 2022 which they won.

In January 2023, Blacklist finished as runners-up to ECHO at the M4 World Championship. Blacklist finished as runners up again to ECHO in MPL PH Season 11 in May 2023. The duo took a break again for Season 12. Wise announced his resignation from Blacklist on July 4, 2024, shortly after OhMyV33Nus' announced his departure.

=== Content creation ===
==== Aurora Gaming ====
Aurora Gaming of MPL PH has signed in V33Wise in July 2024. The duo's role was later clarified to fulfill the role of content directors.

== Personal lives ==
OhMyV33Nus identifies as a member of the LGBT community. He has been subjected to homophobia as a player but has openly used his identity to represent the LGBT community in esports. He is in a relationship with teammate Wise with the latter describing the former as his "love of my life".

OhMyV33Nus was born on July 20, 1994, in Antipolo, Rizal. In his early years he often played video games for around 12 hours on average. As his family back then did not own a personal computer, he would often frequent internet cafés. His mother is an Overseas Filipino Worker in Japan and lived along with his grandfather and grandmother. Both his grandparents and mother had negative perception on gaming.

He started playing role-playing games such as Ragnarok at age 13. He then shifted to playing Warcraft and Dota, when informal tournaments centering around these types of games became popular. Villaluna at a young age decided he would want to pursue a career in gaming. He started mobile gaming sometime between the period when he was 17 to 19 years old playing games such as League of Legends.
