= MLBB M3 World Championship =

Esports tournament

- 2021

Tournament information
- Sport: Mobile Legends: Bang Bang
- Location: Singapore
- Dates: 6–19 December 2021
- Administrator: Moonton
- Tournament format: Double-Elimination Format (Playoffs)
- Host: Singapore
- Venue: Suntec Singapore Convention and Exhibition Centre
- Participants: 16 teams
- Purse: $800,000

Final positions
- Champions: Blacklist International
- 1st runners-up: ONIC Philippines
- 2nd runners-up: BloodThirstyKings

Tournament statistics
- Matches played: 95
- MVP: Kiel "Oheb" Soriano
- Most Assists: Johnmar "OhMyV33nus" Villaluna
- Top Region: Singapore
- Pro Player: Albert "Alberttt" Neilsen (RRQ Hoshi)

The 2021 Mobile Legends: Bang Bang World Championship, commonly known as M3 or the M3 World Championship, was the third edition of the Mobile Legends World Championships, an esports tournament for the game Mobile Legends: Bang Bang. It was held from 6 December until its Grand Finals on 19 December 2021 in Suntec Singapore Convention and Exhibition Centre in Singapore.

== Background ==
M3 is the third series of the Mobile Legends World Championship and is held in the same year as the second series was held in the same nation. M3 features 16 teams with each qualifying for their regional or national qualifiers known as the Mobile Legends: Bang Bang Professional League or MPL. These teams were all announced on the same day with their roster on 25 November 2021. M3 features 11 Asian Teams, 1 North American Team, 1 Arabian-Region Team and 3 Latin American Teams.

== Coronavirus ==
The COVID-19 pandemic in Singapore posed a significant challenge for the organizers of the World Championships as the venue in Singapore provided strict health regulations provided by the Government of Singapore as well as the players travelling from abroad. However, on 8 August 2021, Moonton, the developer of the game Mobile Legends: Bang Bang announced and confirmed that M3 will be happening by the end of 2021.

== Venue ==
Singapore
Suntec City, Singapore
Group Stage, Playoffs, Grand Finals
Suntec Singapore Convention and Exhibition Centre
Capacity: 1,800

== Qualified teams and rosters ==
=== Qualified teams ===
Qualifying for the M3 World Championships comes from the competing nation's Mobile Legends: Bang Bang Professional League, commonly known as "MPL". However, regional qualifiers in the CIS Region, North America, Arabia, and Latin American regions were also held to broaden the reach of the Championship's teams.

The defending World Champions in Bren Esports would not be redeemed to repeat back-to-back championship titles due to them having a non-playoff contention in MPL Philippines Season 8 that was ultimately won by Blacklist International in 5 games.

Qualifiers
Region	League	Qualification method	Team name	ID	Group
Philippines	MPL Philippines	MPL Philippines Season 8 Champions	(Philippines) Blacklist International	BLCK	A
Philippines	MPL Philippines	MPL Philippines Season 8 Runner-up	ONIC Philippines	ONIC-PH	B
Indonesia	MPL Indonesia	MPL Indonesia Season 8 Champions	(Indonesia) ONIC Esports	ONIC	B
Indonesia	MPL Indonesia	MPL Indonesia Season 8 Runner-up	(Indonesia) RRQ Hoshi	RRQ	D
Malaysia	MPL Malaysia	MPL Malaysia Season 8 Champions	(Malaysia) Team SMG	SMG	D
Malaysia	MPL Malaysia	MPL Malaysia Season 8 Runner-up	(Malaysia) Todak	TDK	B
Singapore	MPL Singapore	MPL Singapore Season 2 Champions	(Singapore) EVOS SG	EVOS	C
Singapore	MPL Singapore	MPL Singapore Season 2 Runner-up	(Singapore) RSG SG	RSG	D
Brazil	MPL Brazil	MPL Brazil Season 1 Champions	(Brazil) Red Canids	RED	A
Brazil	MPL Brazil	MPL Brazil Season 1 Runner-up	(Brazil) Keyd Stars	VK	B
Cambodia	MPL Cambodia	MPL Cambodia Season 1 Champions	(Cambodia) SeeYouSoon	SYS	C
Ukraine	Mythic League	MML Season 2 Qualifiers	(Ukraine) Natus Vincere	NAVI	C
Middle East	M3 Arabia Major	Arabia Major Qualifiers	GX Squad	GX	D
Turkey	Turkish Qualifiers	Turkish Qualifying Team	(Turkey) Bedel	BDL	A
Latin America	LATAM Championship	LATAM Qualifiers	(Peru) Malvinas Gaming	MVG	A
North America	North American Qualifier	North American Qualifying Team	(United States) BloodThirstyKings	BTK	C

=== Rosters ===
Player did not play games

Official Rosters of all Qualified Teams
Team	Players											Coach/Manager
Team	Jungle		Exp Lane		Gold Lane		Midlaner			Roamer		Coach/Manager
(Philippines) Blacklist International	Wise (Danerie James Del Rosario)		Edward (Edward Jay Dapadap)		Oheb (Kiel Calvin Soriano)		Dex Star (Dexter Louise Alaba)	Eson (Mark Jayson Gerardo)	OhMyV33Nus (Johnmar Villaluna)	Hadji (Salic A. Imam)		Bon Chan (Kristoffer Ed L. Ricaplaza)
ONIC Philippines	Kairi (Kairi Rayodelsol)		Dlarskie (Gerald Trinchera)	Ryota (Nowee Cabailo)	Hatred (Jaylord Gonzales)	Markyyyy (Mark Christian Etcobanez)	Baloyskie (Aloy Jedric Baloy)			Micophobia (Karl Mico Tarala)	Beemo (Paul Ian Sergio)	Yeb (Paul Denver Lintag Miranda)
(Indonesia) ONIC Esports	Sanz (Gilang)		Butsss (Muhammad Satrya Sanubari)		CW (Calvin Winata)		Drian (Adriand Larsen Wong)		Maipan (Irvan Yusuf)	Kiboy (Nicky Fernando)		Somber (Chen Po-Heng)
(Indonesia) RRQ Hoshi	Alberttt (Albert Neilsen Iskandar)		R7 (Rivaldi Fatah)		Xinnn (Yesaya Omega Armando Wowiling)	Skylar (Schevenko David Tendean)	Vynnn (Calvin)	Clayyy (Deden Muhammad Nurhasan)		Psychooo (Teguh Imam Firdaus)	Liam (William Setiawan)	Acil (Adi Syofian Asyauri)
(Malaysia) Team SMG	Wynn (Muhammad Fahmi Ikhwan)		Smooth (Aileff Adam)	Myzer (Muhammad Hakim Mikha)	Loong (Saw Kee Loong)	Sasa (Lu Khai Bean)	Zaim Sempoi (Muhammad Zaim)			XpDEA (Mohamad Harith Aiman)		Jamesss (James “Jamesss” Chen)
(Malaysia) Todak	CikuGais (Muhammad Danial)	Ajiq (Muhammad Amirul Raziq)	Momo (Idreen Bin Abdul Jamal)		4Meyz (Wan Usman)		Moon (Zikry Bin Shamsuddin)			Yums (Abd Qayyum)	Moyy (Mohamad Farhan Wakiman)	Ashi (Mohd Syazlan)
(Singapore) EVOS SG	.Potato (Andrew Lim)		Gear (Tristan Christopher Nathanael)	Smokey (Roy Chua)	Adammir (Adam Chong)		Seilah (Basil Lim Dao Ze)			JPL (Akihiro Furusawa)		Young in (Daryl Ng Jun Da)
(Singapore) RSG SG	ly4ly4ly4 (Lim Yang)	Dec	Diablo (Yeo Wee Lun)	Babycakes (Jovan Ong)	Jason (Koh Wei Hao Jason)		Sana (Ming Brandon)		505	Lolsie (Bellamy Yeov)		Kayzeepi (Eugene Kong Zhen Pang)
(Brazil) Red Canids	Jump Style (Abraão Santos)		Akashi (Nicolas Sanches Vieira)		Upa (Lucas Jose)		Frostt (Matheus Santos)		xManiac (Arthur Martins Nazario)	Lunna (Victor Monteiro)		Darkness (Diego Wellington Costa Casado)
(Brazil) Keyd Stars	Kiing (Lucas Felipe Godoy)		Tekashi (Arthur Nascimento)		Luiizz (Luiz Henrique Alves)		Prime (André Martini)			Mayke (Mayke Santana)		Cabral (Godman Cabral)
(Cambodia) SeeYouSoon	Houx (Lim Kimhouv)		Felix (Leng Kimhak)		Runn (Mon Phearun)	Paragon (Sam Sophanny)	Ember (Sengin Bunchhay)					
(Commonwealth of Independent States) Natus Vincere	Sunset Lover (Kemiran Kochkarov)		Defender (Andriy Martynenko)		Lil (Ruslan Degtev)		Nangib (Maxim Dudich)			Sawo (Stanislav Reshinak)		WarBarbie (Alexandr Korystin)
GX Squad	Amuni		Dar007		Fuuji		Yato		Dantee	Hisk		
(Turkey) Bedel	Farway		Yunshi		Alien		Paranoid		Farway	Asmo		
(Peru) Malvinas Gaming	Quinn		Xing		Eidrian		Harle			Stephe		
(United States) BloodThirstyKings	MobaZane (Michael Cosgun)		FwydChickn		Victor		Zia			Shark		

=== Group Draw ===
The Group Draw was held on 6 November 2021, exactly one month before the tournament began, the sixteen teams that qualified for the global tournament were grouped into 4 groups of 4 teams each.

Draw on 6 November 2021
Group A	Group B	Group C	Group D
(Philippines) Blacklist International	(Indonesia) ONIC Esports	(Singapore) EVOS SG	(Indonesia) RRQ Hoshi
(Brazil) Red Canids	ONIC Philippines	(Cambodia) SeeYouSoon	(Singapore) RSG SG
(Peru) Malvinas Gaming	(Malaysia) Todak	(United States) BloodThirstyKings	(Malaysia) Team SMG
(Turkey) Bedel	(Brazil) Keyd Stars	(Commonwealth of Independent States) Natus Vincere	GX Squad

== Format ==
- Group Stage: 6 to 9 December 2021
  - 16 teams qualified for the event are split into four groups of 4 teams each.
  - All matches in the group stage are played in a Bo1 series.
  - The top two teams per group qualified for the Upper Bracket Playoffs
  - The bottom two teams per group qualified for the Lower Bracket Playoffs
- Playoffs: 11 to 19 December 2021
  - Sixteen teams play in a double-elimination tournament.
  - Eight teams begin in the Upper Bracket, and eight teams begin in the Lower Bracket.
  - Lower Bracket Rounds 1 and 2 are a Bo3 series, the rest of the playoffs were a Bo5 series, except for the Grand Final, which was a Bo7 series.

== Group Stage ==
The Group Stages commenced on 6 December and concluded on 9 December 2021. All games in the group stage were in a Bo1 format. There were no teams eliminated at the end of group stages, but the upper two teams in each group qualified for the Upper Bracket playoffs, while the lower two qualified for the Lower Bracket Playoffs.

=== Group A ===
Pos	Team	Pld	W	L	PCT	Qualification	BLCK	BDL	RDC	MVG
1	(Philippines) Blacklist International	3	3	0	1.000	Upper Bracket Playoffs	—	1–0	1–0	1–0
2	(Turkey) Bedel	3	1	2	.333 (Note: Won tiebreaker match vs. Red Canids)	Upper Bracket Playoffs	0–1	—	0–1	1–0
3	(Brazil) Red Canids	3	1	2	.333 (Note: Won tiebreaker vs. Malvinas, lost to Bedel)	Lower Bracket Playoffs	0–1	1–0	—	0–1
4	(Peru) Malvinas Gaming	3	1	2	.333 (Note: Lost tiebreaker semis vs. Red Canids)	Lower Bracket Playoffs	0–1	0–1	1–0	—

Source: Schedule

==== Tiebreaker ====
As there was a three-way tie in Group A, Bedel was placed in the Tiebreaker final as they had the fastest time in games won. Thus, Red Canids and Malvinas Gaming played in the Tiebreaker semifinals which loser of that match qualified for the lower bracket.

Semifinals			Tiebreaker Match
			A2	(Turkey) Bedel	1
A3	(Brazil) Red Canids	1	A3	(Brazil) Red Canids	0
A4	(Peru) Malvinas Gaming	0

=== Group B ===
Pos	Team	Pld	W	L	PCT	Qualification	ONIC PH	TDK	KEYD	ONIC ID
1	ONIC Philippines	3	2	1	.667 (Note: ONIC PH 1–0 TODAK)	Upper Bracket Playoffs	—	1–0	1–0	0–1
2	(Malaysia) Todak	3	2	1	.667	Upper Bracket Playoffs	0–1	—	1–0	1–0
3	(Brazil) Keyd Stars	3	1	2	.333 (Note: Keyd Stars 1–0 ONIC Esports)	Lower Bracket Playoffs	0–1	0–1	—	1–0
4	(Indonesia) ONIC Esports	3	1	2	.333	Lower Bracket Playoffs	1–0	0–1	0–1	—

Source: Schedule

=== Group C ===
Pos	Team	Pld	W	L	PCT	Qualification	EVOS	BTK	NAVI	SYS
1	(Singapore) EVOS SG (H)	3	3	0	1.000	Upper Bracket Playoffs	—	1–0	1–0	1–0
2	(United States) BloodThirstyKings	3	2	1	.667	Upper Bracket Playoffs	0–1	—	1–0	1–0
3	(Commonwealth of Independent States) Natus Vincere	3	1	2	.333	Lower Bracket Playoffs	0–1	0–1	—	1–0
4	(Cambodia) SeeYouSoon	3	0	3	.000	Lower Bracket Playoffs	0–1	0–1	0–1	—

Source: Schedule
(H) Hosts

=== Group D ===
Pos	Team	Pld	W	L	PCT	Qualification	RRQ	RSG SG	SMG	GXQ
1	(Indonesia) RRQ Hoshi	3	3	0	1.000	Upper Bracket Playoffs	—	1–0	1–0	1–0
2	(Singapore) RSG SG (H)	3	2	1	.667	Upper Bracket Playoffs	0–1	—	1–0	1–0
3	(Malaysia) Team SMG	3	1	2	.333	Lower Bracket Playoffs	0–1	0–1	—	1–0
4	GX Squad	3	0	3	.000	Lower Bracket Playoffs	0–1	0–1	0–1	—

Source: Schedule
(H) Hosts

Group Matches (Bo1)
Group A Matches					Group B Matches					Group C Matches					Group D Matches				
Match No.	Team	Results		Team	Match No.	Team	Results		Team	Match No.	Team	Results		Team	Match No.	Team	Results		Team
1	Blacklist International (Philippines)	1	0	(Brazil) Red Canids	1	ONIC Esports (Indonesia)	1	0	ONIC Philippines	1	EVOS SG (Singapore)	1	0	SeeYouSoon (Cambodia)	1	RRQ Hoshi (Indonesia)	1	0	Team SMG (Malaysia)
2	Malvinas Gaming (Peru)	0	1	Bedel (Turkey)	2	Todak (Malaysia)	1	0	KEYD Stars (Brazil)	2	NATUS Vincere (Commonwealth of Independent States)	0	1	BTK (United States)	2	GX Squad	0	1	RSG SG (Singapore)
3	Blacklist International (Philippines)	1	0	Bedel (Turkey)	3	ONIC Esports (Indonesia)	0	1	Keyd Stars (Brazil)	3	EVOS SG (Singapore)	1	0	BTK (United States)	3	Team SMG (Malaysia)	0	1	RSG SG (Singapore)
4	(Brazil) Red Canids	0	1	Malvinas Gaming (Peru)	4	ONIC Philippines	1	0	TODAK (Malaysia)	4	SeeYouSoon (Cambodia)	0	1	Natus Vincere (Commonwealth of Independent States)	4	RRQ Hoshi (Indonesia)	1	0	GX Squad
5	Blacklist International (Philippines)	1	0	Malvinas Gaming (Peru)	5	ONIC Esports (Indonesia)	0	1	Todak (Malaysia)	5	EVOS SG (Singapore)	1	0	Natus Vincere (Commonwealth of Independent States)	5	Team SMG (Malaysia)	1	0	GX Squad
6	(Brazil) Red Canids	1	0	Bedel (Turkey)	6	ONIC Philippines	1	0	KEYD Stars (Brazil)	6	SeeYouSoon (Cambodia)	0	1	BloodThirstyKings (United States)	6	RRQ Hoshi (Indonesia)	1	0	RSG SG (Singapore)

== Playoffs ==
The first two rounds of the Lower Bracket are a Best-of-three series, and the rest of the playoffs are a Best-of-five series, except the Grand Final which was a best-of-7 series.

=== Bracket ===
Upper Bracket Quarterfinals	Upper Bracket Semifinals	Upper Bracket Final	Grand Final
(Philippines) Blacklist International	2
(United States) BloodThirstyKings	3
(United States) BloodThirstyKings	3
EVOS Singapore	1
(Turkey) Bedel	1
EVOS Singapore	3
(United States) BloodThirstyKings	0
ONIC Philippines	3
ONIC Philippines	3
RSG Singapore	0
ONIC Philippines	3
(Indonesia) RRQ Hoshi	0
(Malaysia) Todak	1
(Indonesia) RRQ Hoshi	3
ONIC Philippines	0
(Philippines) Blacklist International	4
Lower Bracket - Round 1	Lower Bracket - Round 2	Lower Bracket - Round 3	Lower Bracket Quarterfinals	Lower Bracket Semifinals	Lower Bracket Final
(Philippines) Blacklist Intl.	2
(Indonesia) RRQ Hoshi	0
(Malaysia) Team SMG	0	(Indonesia) ONIC Esports	1
(Philippines) Blacklist Intl.	3	(Philippines) Blacklist Int.	3
(Indonesia) ONIC Esports	2
(Brazil) Keyd Stars	0	(United States) BloodThirstyKings	1
(Turkey) Bedel	0
(Philippines) Blacklist Int.	3	(Philippines) Blacklist Int.	3
(Brazil) Keyd Stars	2	(Brazil) Keyd Stars	2
(Singapore) EVOS SG	0
GX Squad	0
RSG Singapore	0
(Singapore) EVOS SG	3
(Commonwealth of Independent States) Natus Vincere	2	(Commonwealth of Independent States) Natus Vincere	2
(Commonwealth of Independent States) Natus Vincere	2	(Malaysia) Todak	2
(Peru) Malvinas Gaming	1
(Malaysia) Todak	3
(Malaysia) Todak	2
(Brazil) Red Canids	0	(Cambodia) SeeYouSoon	1
(Cambodia) SeeYouSoon	2

=== Lower Bracket ===
The lower bracket showed an elimination round of teams during the third day of the Playoffs.

Day No. 3 (Bo3)
Match No.	Team	Result		Team	Outcome
1	(Malaysia) Team SMG	0	2	(Indonesia) ONIC Esports	ONIC Esports advances; Team SMG eliminated.
2	(Brazil) Keyd Stars	2	0	GX Squad	Keyd Stars advances; GX Squad eliminated.
3	(Commonwealth of Independent States) Natus Vincere	2	1	(Peru) Malvinas Gaming	Natus Vincere advances; Malvinas Gaming eliminated.
4	(Brazil) Red Canids	0	2	(Cambodia) SeeYouSoon	SeeYouSoon advances; Red Canids eliminated.

Day No. 4 (Bo3)
Match No.	Team	Result		Team	Outcome
1	(Philippines) Blacklist International	2	1	(Indonesia) ONIC Esports	Blacklist International advances; ONIC Esports eliminated.
2	(Turkey) Bedel	0	2	(Brazil) KEYD Stars	Keyd Stars advances; Bedel eliminated.
3	(Singapore) RSG SG	0	2	(Commonwealth of Independent States) Natus Vincere	Natus Vincere advances; RSG SG eliminated.
4	(Malaysia) TODAK	2	1	(Cambodia) SeeYouSoon	TODAK advances; SeeYouSoon eliminated.

Day No. 5 (Bo5)
Match No.	Team	Result		Team	Outcome
1	(Philippines) Blacklist International	3	0	(Brazil) Keyd Stars	Blacklist International advances; Keyd Stars eliminated.
2	ONIC Philippines	3	0	(Indonesia) RRQ Hoshi	ONIC Philippines advances; RRQ Hoshi goes to the Lower-Bracket.

Day No. 6 (Bo5)
Match No.	Team	Result		Team	Outcome
1	(United States) BloodThirstyKings	3	1	(Singapore) EVOS	BloodThirstyKings advances; EVOS SG goes to the Lower-Bracket.
2	(Commonwealth of Independent States) Natus Vincere	2	3	(Malaysia) Todak	Todak advances; Natus Vincere eliminated.

Day No. 5 (Bo5)
Match No.	Team	Result		Team	Outcome
1	(Philippines) Blacklist International	3	0	(Brazil) Keyd Stars	Blacklist International advances; Keyd Stars eliminated.
2	ONIC Philippines	3	0	(Indonesia) RRQ Hoshi	ONIC Philippines advances; RRQ Hoshi goes to the Lower-Bracket.

Day No. 7 (Bo5)
Match No.	Team	Result		Team	Outcome
1	(Philippines) Blacklist International	3	0	(Indonesia) RRQ Hoshi	Blacklist International advances; RRQ Hoshi eliminated.
2	(Malaysia) Todak	2	3	(Singapore) EVOS	EVOS SG advances; Todak eliminated.

Day No. 8 (Bo5)
Match No.	Team	Result		Team	Outcome
1	ONIC Philippines	3	0	(United States) BloodThirstyKings	ONIC Philippines advances to the Grand Finals; BloodthirstyKings goes to the Lower-Bracket.
2	(Singapore) EVOS	0	3	(Philippines) Blacklist International	Blacklist International advances; EVOS SG eliminated.
3	(United States) BloodThirstyKings	1	3	(Philippines) Blacklist International	Blacklist International advances to the Grand Finals; BloodThirstyKings eliminated.

With the win of Blacklist International against BloodThirstyKings, they advanced to the Grand Finals, making M3 the first World Tournament to be contested by the two Philippine representatives of MPL Philippines Season 8 and making the Philippines the first and, so far, only nation to win Back-to-Back World Titles for Mobile Legends: Bang Bang. The Other team would be Bren Esports who won the M2 World Title in the same year.

=== Grand Finals ===
With ONIC Philippines and Blacklist International in the Grand Finals, it would be the second rematch between both teams after both teams were the eventual runner-up and Champions of MPL Philippines Season 8. The Grand Finals was held on 19 December 2021.

==== Game 1 ====
19 December 2021 21:04 Match Time	ONIC Philippines 14,	18, Blacklist International (Philippines)	Suntec Singapore Convention and Exhibition Centre, Singapore
19 December 2021 21:04 Match Time	Most Kills (by its KDA)		Suntec Singapore Convention and Exhibition Centre, Singapore
19 December 2021 21:04 Match Time	Hatred, 6/2/2	Wise, 8/3/5	Suntec Singapore Convention and Exhibition Centre, Singapore
19 December 2021 21:04 Match Time	Most Assists (by its KDA)		Suntec Singapore Convention and Exhibition Centre, Singapore
19 December 2021 21:04 Match Time	Markyyyy, 3/2/9	OhMyV33Nus, 0/2/15	Suntec Singapore Convention and Exhibition Centre, Singapore
19 December 2021 21:04 Match Time	Game MVP		Suntec Singapore Convention and Exhibition Centre, Singapore
19 December 2021 21:04 Match Time	Oheb, 5/5/10		Suntec Singapore Convention and Exhibition Centre, Singapore
Blacklist International leads, 1-0

Game 1 of M3 began with the introduction of the players and rosters of both teams. Blacklist International with their Championship Lineup and the "Death Lineup" called by ONIC Philippines that led them to a 9-0 contest in the Upper Bracket.

With an early lead in the early stages of the game, ONIC Philippines was destined to win the matchup after the first turtle take was immediately stolen by Kairi, however, with the amazing defense that Blacklist International brought, they would lead the series 1–0 against ONIC with Marksman Oheb with the Clint as the MVP.

==== Game 2 ====
19 December 2021 13:40 Match Time	ONIC Philippines 7,	19, Blacklist International (Philippines)	Suntec Singapore Convention and Exhibition Centre, Singapore
19 December 2021 13:40 Match Time	Most Kills (by its KDA)		Suntec Singapore Convention and Exhibition Centre, Singapore
19 December 2021 13:40 Match Time	Markyyyy, 3/4/1	Oheb, 8/1/8	Suntec Singapore Convention and Exhibition Centre, Singapore
19 December 2021 13:40 Match Time	Most Assists (by its KDA)		Suntec Singapore Convention and Exhibition Centre, Singapore
19 December 2021 13:40 Match Time	Baloyskie, 0/5/6	OhMyV33Nus, 1/1/17	Suntec Singapore Convention and Exhibition Centre, Singapore
19 December 2021 13:40 Match Time	Game MVP		Suntec Singapore Convention and Exhibition Centre, Singapore
19 December 2021 13:40 Match Time	Oheb, 8/1/8		Suntec Singapore Convention and Exhibition Centre, Singapore
Blacklist International leads, 2-0

Game 2 would merely shape the same drafting of heroes' in the hero pool yet changed with some tactics and plans laid down by both Coaches Yeb and Bon Chan of ONIC and Blacklist, respectively. With a great early game lead taken by ONIC Philippines, it would immediately be a turnout same as Game Number 1 as the Beatrix in OHEB began to increase its damage, severely damaging the tactics of ONIC Philippines. Blacklist International would eventually take Game 2 against ONIC.

==== Game 3 ====
19 December 2021 21:07 Match Time	ONIC Philippines 17,	20, Blacklist International (Philippines)	Suntec Singapore Convention and Exhibition Centre, Singapore
19 December 2021 21:07 Match Time	Most Kills (by its KDA)		Suntec Singapore Convention and Exhibition Centre, Singapore
19 December 2021 21:07 Match Time	Kairi, 5/5/9	Wise, 8/3/3	Suntec Singapore Convention and Exhibition Centre, Singapore
19 December 2021 21:07 Match Time	Most Assists (by its KDA)		Suntec Singapore Convention and Exhibition Centre, Singapore
19 December 2021 21:07 Match Time	Kairi, 5/5/9	OhMyV33Nus, 1/2/13	Suntec Singapore Convention and Exhibition Centre, Singapore
19 December 2021 21:07 Match Time	Game MVP		Suntec Singapore Convention and Exhibition Centre, Singapore
19 December 2021 21:07 Match Time	Edward, 5/4/7		Suntec Singapore Convention and Exhibition Centre, Singapore
Blacklist International leads, 3-0

Going for a double marksman lineup, Blacklist International was easily taking the lead in the early game. Yet with the counter from Baloyskie's Lolita, it seemed that it will try and close the gap of Blacklist's lead in the early game. With the first Turtle going for Kairi and the second turtle on Wise, it stays at a close match.

8 minutes into the game, ONIC Philippines made an impressive diversion play on the bottom lane after killing three out of five of Blacklist's players. With back-and-forth lead takes by both teams, Blacklist International would inevitably win Game 3 and will be needing only one more game to win the title.

==== Game 4 ====
19 December 2021 13:48 Match Time	ONIC Philippines 7,	15, Blacklist International (Philippines)	Suntec Singapore Convention and Exhibition Centre, Singapore
19 December 2021 13:48 Match Time	Most Kills (by its KDA)		Suntec Singapore Convention and Exhibition Centre, Singapore
19 December 2021 13:48 Match Time	Baloyskie, 2/6/0 Hatred, 2/2/3 Markyyyy, 2/4/3	Oheb, 6/1/3	Suntec Singapore Convention and Exhibition Centre, Singapore
19 December 2021 13:48 Match Time	Most Assists (by its KDA)		Suntec Singapore Convention and Exhibition Centre, Singapore
19 December 2021 13:48 Match Time	Markyyyy, 2/4/3	OhMyV33Nus, 0/2/11	Suntec Singapore Convention and Exhibition Centre, Singapore
19 December 2021 13:48 Match Time	Game MVP		Suntec Singapore Convention and Exhibition Centre, Singapore
19 December 2021 13:48 Match Time	Wise, 6/0/3 (based on Statistics)		Suntec Singapore Convention and Exhibition Centre, Singapore
Blacklist International wins, 4-0

With a 3–0 lead, Blacklist is destined to finish the series in only 4 games yet ONIC PH would simply try to draft out Blacklist in the process, stealing the Barats and the Pharsa picks from both Wise and Hadji, respectively, as well as putting more defense and damage by Natalia. However, Blacklist would stick to the double-marksman strategy from Game 3 after the banning of Uranus of Dlarskie.

With the great damage output from Wise’s Natan, alongside Blacklist International’s impressive defense around the outer turrets, they were able to finish the series with a 4–0 sweep, becoming the first team in MLBB World Championship history to sweep a Grand Final. The victory also made the Philippines the first and, at the time, only nation to win back-to-back M-Series World Championship titles. Meanwhile, Kiel “OHEB” Soriano, known as the “Filipino Sniper,” was crowned Finals MVP for his outstanding performances throughout the series.

MVP of the Match

Drafting of Heroes
Game No.	Blacklist International					ONIC Philippines					Outcome
Game No.	Hadji	Wise	OhMyV33Nus	Edward	Oheb	Dlarskie	Kairi	Markyyyy	Baloyskie	Hatred	Outcome
1	Pharsa	Yi-Sun Shin	Rafaela	Uranus	Clint	Esmeralda	Lancelot	Lylia	Mathilda	Beatrix	BLCK leads 1-0
2	Pharsa	Barats	Rafaela	Uranus	Beatrix	Yu Zhong	Yi-Sun Shin	Natan	Mathilda	Paquito	BLCK leads 2-0
3	Beatrix	Barats	Rafaela	Esmeralda	Natan	Uranus	Yi-Sun Shin	Pharsa	Lolita	Chou	BLCK leads 3-0
4	Chou	Natan	Mathilda	Paquito	Beatrix	Barats	Yi-Sun Shin	Pharsa	Natalia	Rafaela	BLCK wins 4-0

== Final standings ==
Rank	Team	Prize
1	Blacklist International	US$300,000
2	ONIC Philippines	US$120,000
3	BloodThirstyKings	US$80,000
4	EVOS SG	US$55,000
5	Todak	US$40,000
6	RRQ Hoshi	US$40,000
7	Natus Vincere	US$30,000
8	Keyd Stars	US$30,000
9	ONIC Esports	US$15,000
10	SeeYouSoon	US$15,000
11	RSG SG	US$15,000
12	Bedel	US$15,000
13	Team SMG	US$10,000
14	Red Canids	US$10,000
15	Malvinas Gaming	US$10,000
16	GX Squad	US$10,000

== Controversy ==
On 23 December 2021, circulating on Facebook was the hashtag "#WeWantEstes" that was ultimately a protest hashtag by the MLBB Filipino community to Moonton for their cancellation on the creation of the Estes skin, previously picked by Finals MVP Oheb for it was their trademark hero ever since they competed in M3 alongside MPL Philippines. On the same day, Moonton released a statement stating that "We would like to clarify that the M3 Champion Skin has not yet been determined, and development is still underway".

Fans of Blacklist International, who are the champions of M3, were angered and flustered about the cancellation of the Estes skin picked by the team as it was stated by player OhMyV33NUS that the Estes skin would be cancelled after Moonton denied the creation of an Estes skin because it was not "marketable". Moonton has asked him for three different and alternative heroes that can ultimately be Estes' replacements which were Beatrix, Yi Sun-Shin, and Mathilda. All three trademark heroes of Blacklist International.

Ultimately on 24 December, meeting with the creative management of Moonton, alongside Tier One Entertainment's co-founders in Alodia Gosiengfiao and Tryke Gutierrez, Estes would be the official M3 Championship hero that will obtain skin from the team of Blacklist International. The announcement came with the hashtag "#WeChooseEstes".

Awards and achievements
Preceded by Bren Esports	MLBB World Champion; Blacklist International; The MLBB M3 World Champions	Succeeded by ECHO Philippines
Preceded by Karl Gabriel "KarlTzy" Nepomuceno	MLBB Finals MVP; Kiel Calvin "OHEB" Soriano; The MLBB M3 Finals MVP	Succeeded by Frederic "Bennyqt" Gonzales
