= Onic Philippines =

Professional esports organization based in the Philippines

ONIC Philippines
- ONIC Philippines logo (MPL-PH Season 8 to Season 13 pre-Playoffs)
- Short name: ONIC
- Sport: Mobile Legends: Bang Bang
- Founded: 2018
- Division: MPL Philippines
- Location: Southeast Asia
- Colors: Yellow; Blue; Red
- Division titles: MPL Philippines Season 14 Champion
- Mascot: Hedgehog
- Official fan club: SONICS
- Main sponsor: Monster Energy; Timex; KTM Bike Industries; Anteriore Solutions
- Parent group: ONIC Esports; Fnatic
- Website: onic.gg

ONIC Philippines (formerly known as Fnatic ONIC Philippines; abbreviated as ONIC PH and formerly FNOP) is a Filipino Mobile Legends: Bang Bang esports team that has participated in the MPL Philippines (MPL PH) since Season 4. The team was formerly known as Dream High Gaming before MPL-PH Season 4 (2019) and as Fnatic ONIC Philippines from Seasons 13 to 14. Its parent organization have officially parted ways with Fnatic on January 4, 2025.

== Mobile Legends: Bang Bang ==
=== MPL Philippines ===
==== Season 4 (2019) ====
Previously known as Dream High Gaming, ONIC PH's lineup included OhMyV33Nus, Wise, RR Esports, Greed, Dlar, and Zico. RR Esports subsequently left, with Iy4knu taking his place. Later, Dream High Gaming competed in the MPL-PH S4 Qualifiers, where they defeated Akosi Dogie's Rumble Royale. After acquiring Dream High Gaming's squad, ONIC Esports ID renamed as ONIC PH. Despite being a new team, they won against most of their opponents, with their only loss coming against Sunparks. ONIC PH later finished 2nd place in the Regular Season, behind Sunsparks.

==== Season 5 (2020) ====
Despite losing to Bren Esports and SunSparks during the regular season, the team subsequently swapped Greed for Fuzaken, and everyone anticipated them to finally win the championship. Despite being dropped to the Lower Bracket during the playoffs, they were able to advance to the Grand Finals by defeating Bren Esports. SunSparks defeats them once more, this time by a score of 3–1.

==== Season 6 (2020) ====
They were able to get Basic from ULVL when Fuzaken departed the squad (now BNK Blu Fire). Despite the fact that he was acquired, this is Onic's worst season to date. Bren defeats them twice, the first time 2-1 and the second time 2–0. They're also defeated by teams they've beaten in prior seasons, such as Blacklist International and Execration. They ended in a disappointing fourth place, losing to Execration in a "reverse sweep" by a score of 3–2.

==== Season 7 (2021) ====
Major changes in the Onic PH team happen in Season 7 with the exchange of the iconic duo OhmyV33nus and Wise to Blacklist International in return for Kairi "Kairi" Rayosdelsol. They did well in the MPLI, but not as well as they had hoped, losing to Work Auster Force, NXP Solid, and Blacklist International, despite defeating other better teams later in the Regular Season, such as Aura, Execration, and Bren. They were knocked out of the Playoffs early, losing 3–2 to Execration.

==== Season 8 (2021) ====
After finishing second in Seasons 4 and 5, they settled for a runner-up result in Season 8. The team had a major makeover, with four of the six-man lineup from the previous season returning, including former Laus Playbook players Nowee "Ryota" Macasa and Ian "Beemo" Sergio. They also feature Mico "miicoo" Quitlong, a rookie, and veteran Allen "Greed_" Baloy, who played for Onic in season 4 before moving to Aura PH in season 5. Onic Philippines would eventually rank second overall finishing 9-5 and 21–13 in the standings and would find its way to its third finals appearance and its first final appearance in over 2 seasons. Onic Philippines would eventually lose to the back-to-back titleholders in Blacklist International in 5 games. Onic Philippines first to get slot for the M3 after defeating Smart Omega in the score of 3–0 in favor Onic Ph.

==== Season 9 (2022) ====
Prior to the beginning of MPL Philippines Season 9, it was announced that the 1st-runner up of the M3 World Championships in ONIC Philippines, would not be adding nor removing players from their current lineup.

A Season-opening game against Blacklist International was set as the first game schedule for the day. ONIC Philippines would finish a 2-1 series win against the reigning defending champions of both MPL Philippines and the Mobile Legends World Championships. ONIC would repeat their dominant role against the complete juggernauts of MPL PH Season 9, giving ECHO Philippines its first series lost in a 2-1 series game.

==== Season 10 (2022) ====
ONIC Philippines' roster began to fall apart from its MLBB M3 Form, with the release of Coach Yeb and Kairi the main ONIC team in Indonesia and the slow departure of the other members such as Micophobia, Markyyy, Baloyskie, Dlarskie, and Hatred. With numerous rumors that ONIC Philippines will not compete due to possible buyout of the team in MPL Philippines Season 10, rumors were eventually denied as the organization confirmed that ONIC Philippines will be competing. On July 13, 2022, a new roster was eventually released with the popular "ChooxTV" in the roster poster.

On August 25, 2022, ONIC Philippines suddenly announced on their Facebook page about the released of their member Edgar "ChooxTV" Dumali, currently the team is on the top standing after the 2-1 match against the Smart Omega

==== Season 13 (2024) ====
ONIC-PH would have a complete overhaul of their roster from Seasons 11 and 12, both times failing to advance past the Play-In, signing Kelra as an additional gold laner and K1NGKONG to replace Raizen as their starting jungler. Their MPL Philippines regular season would see them miss out on the main playoffs after losing to AP Bren on the final matchweek, kicking them into the Play-In second round after a 4th place finish.

===== Rebranding to Fnatic ONIC =====
On May 20, 2024, before the MPL Philippines Season 13 Playoffs would begin, ONIC Philippines announced their partnership with British esports organization Fnatic, with the team name changing to FNATIC ONIC Philippines (Or FNATIC ONIC PH).

=== Season 14 (2024) ===
Following the addition of former Minana EVOS players Kirk and former RRQ Hoshi player Brusko, Fnatic ONIC Philippines were able to secure the first seed in MPL Philippines Season 14 and broke the long-standing non-defeated record streak set by Blacklist International during Season 7. Fnatic ONIC Philippines were able to win thirteen straight games without dropping a single loss however, during their last match was when they dropped their only loss in the regular season.

Fnatic ONIC Philippines returns to the world stage after defeating Falcons AP Bren in the upper bracket finals 3 games to 1. Moreover, after a potential comeback from Aurora Gaming, Fnatic ONIC Philippines were able to stage the perfect comeback to win their first franchise title in history as Fnatic ONIC Philippines defeat Aurora Gaming 4 games to 3.

=== M World Championship ===
==== M3 World Championship ====
After finishing second in MPL Philippines Season 8, they would still be the second representative of the Philippines in the M3 World Competition alongside Blacklist International. During the Group Draws, ONIC Philippines would be grouped alongside Indonesia's MPL Champion ONIC Esports, MPL Malaysia Runner-Up TODAK and MPL Brazil Runner-Up KEYD.

After the Group A Matches during the first day, ONIC Philippines would match up first with ONIC Esports of Indonesia. Despite a strong early game control over the game, ONIC Esports would rebound and take the victory by a great comeback (0-1). ONIC Esports would then match-up with Malaysia's TODAK that defeated ONIC Esports during their first matchup, but would fall short to ONIC Philippines (1-1). ONIC Philippines would as well finish strong during the second day, taking a win against Brazil's KEYD (2-1), putting them in the First Seed of Group B, followed by TODAK (2-1), KEYD and ONIC Esports (1-2), securing ONIC the first seed in Group B.

ONIC Philippines got 3–0 sweep against the Singapore runner-up team RSG they snatch the two victories using the Dlarskie hero Uranus and on the last game an epic comeback with Kairi's Natan matching maniac kill.

After ONIC Philippines' sweep victory against RSG Singapore, ONIC Philippines would matchup against RRQ Hoshi, the MPL Indonesia Season 8 Runner-Up. This began as well a talk-and-debate on who was the better Jungler in Kairi or Alberttt of RRQ. ONIC Philippines swept RRQ Hoshi in a 3-0 fashion and will be facing off the winner in Match 16.

They qualified for the Grand Final of MLBB M3 World Championship after the defeat of the North American team BloodThirstyKings (BTK), Hatred's Pharsa in one particular game getting five kills and one assist. After the successful elimination of EVOS SG and BTK, Season 8 rival Blacklist International qualified for the Grand Final from the lower bracket, setting up an all-Filipino Grand Final. In the end, ONIC Philippines ended up in 2nd place after the 4–0 defeat in favour of Blacklist.

==== M6 World Championship ====
After their domestic win over Aurora Gaming and defending world champions Falcons AP Bren, Fnatic ONIC Philippines returns to the world stage since Season 8. Throughout the whole series, they recorded a dominant record (3-0) in the Swiss Stage and became the only Filipino team to qualify for the playoffs since M2, sweeping the Upper Bracket and eventually winning the title after defeating Team Liquid ID, whom they defeated twice prior to the Grand Finals

== Tournament results ==
=== Mobile Legends: Bang Bang ===
ONIC Philippines
Year	League	League	Record		Win Rate		Seed	Final Placement	ESL Snapdragon						MLBB Mid Season Cup	MPLI Invitational	MLBB World Championship
Year	League	League	Game	Match	Game	Match	Seed	Final Placement	OQ1	OQ2	OF	CS	CF	MM	MLBB Mid Season Cup	MPLI Invitational	MLBB World Championship
2019	S4	MPL-PH	8-1	16-4	.889	.800	1st	First Runner Up; 3-2 Sunsparks	—N/a						Did not qualify	—N/a	Group Stage Finish
2020	S5	MPL-PH	7-2	16-5	.778	.762	3rd	First Runner Up; 3-1 Sunsparks	—N/a						Cancelled	9th-12th Place; 2-1 AURA Philippines	Did not qualify
2020	S6	MPL-PH	9-4	19-12	.692	.613	3rd	Third Runner Up; 3-2 Execration	—N/a						Cancelled	9th-12th Place; 2-1 AURA Philippines	Did not qualify
2021	S7	MPL-PH	7-6	15-16	.538	.484	4th	7th-8th Place; 3-2 Execration	—N/a						Did not qualify	9th-12th Place; 2-0 RRQ Hoshi	First Runner-Up; 4-0 Blacklist International
2021	S8	MPL-PH	9-5	21-13	.643	.618	2nd	First Runner-Up; 4-1 Blacklist International	—N/a						Did not qualify	9th-12th Place; 2-0 RRQ Hoshi	First Runner-Up; 4-0 Blacklist International
2022	S9	MPL-PH	8-6	18-19	.571	.486	5th	Third Runner-Up; 3-0 Smart Omega	—N/a						Did not qualify	13th-20th Place; 2-1 AURA Esports	Did not qualify
2022	S10	MPL-PH	7-7	18-17	.500	.514	6th	Play-in Tournament; 3-0 RSG Philippines	—N/a						Did not qualify	13th-20th Place; 2-1 AURA Esports	Did not qualify
2023	S11	MPL-PH	6-8	15-19	.429	.441	5th	Play-in Tournament; 3-0 RSG Philippines	—N/a						Did not qualify	Did not qualify	Did not qualify
2023	S12	MPL-PH	7-7	16-16	.500	.500	5th	Play-in Tournament; 3-2 Blacklist International	—N/a						Did not qualify	Did not qualify	Did not qualify
Fnatic ONIC Philippines
2024	S13	MPL-PH	9-5	19-10	.643	.655	4th	King of the Hill Finish; 3-1 Blacklist International	—N/a						Did not qualify	Defunct	Champions; 4-1 Team Liquid ID
2024	S14	MPL-PH	13-1	27-7	.929	.794	1st	Champions; 4-3; Aurora Gaming	—N/a	—N/a	Q	Q	1st	1st	Did not qualify	Defunct	Champions; 4-1 Team Liquid ID
ONIC Philippines
2025	S15	MPL-PH	11-3	24-10	.786	.706	3rd	First Runner-Up; 3-4 Team Liquid PH	—N/a			Q	1st	1st	Second Runner-Up; 3-2 ONIC Esports	Defunct	Did not qualify
2025	S16	MPL-PH	9-5	22-13	.643	.629	2nd	Third Runner-Up; 2–3 TNC Pro Team	—N/a						Second Runner-Up; 3-2 ONIC Esports	Defunct	Did not qualify
2026	S17	MPL-PH	9-5	20-13	.643	.606	3rd	Second Runner-Up; 2-4 Team Falcons PH	—N/a						Did not qualifiy	Defunct	To be determined
2026	S18	MPL-PH	To be determined						—N/a						Did not qualifiy	Defunct	To be determined

== Current roster ==
MPL Philippines Season 18 ONIC Philippines Mobile Legends: Bang Bang roster
Players
Coaches

Role	Handle	Name	Nationality
EXP Lane	Kirk	Jann Kirk Solcruz Gutierrez	Philippines
EXP Lane	Dan	Dan Nathaniel Yambao	Philippines
Jungler	K1NGKONG	King Cyric Perez	Philippines
Mid Lane	Super Frince	Frince Miguel Ramirez	Philippines
Gold Lane	Savero	Clayton Kuswanto	Indonesia
Roamer	Brusko	Borris James Parro	Philippines
Roamer	Super Yoshi	Czedrick Jaylord Romero	Philippines

Head coach

Angelo Kyle "Pheww" Arcangel

Assistant coach(es)

Jeniel "Haze" Bata-anon
John Christopher "Xy" Yambao

Legend:
- (I) Inactive
- (S) Suspended
- Substitute
- (injured) Injury / Illness

Latest roster transaction: August 12, 2026.

Awards and achievements
Preceded by Team Liquid PH	MPL Philippines Champions; Split 2 - 2024	Succeeded by Team Liquid PH
Preceded by AP Bren	MLBB World Champion; M6 - 2024	Succeeded by Aurora Gaming
