= Team Liquid PH =

Professional Esports organization based in the Philippines

- Short name: Team Liquid PH/TLPH (Season 14–present); Liquid ECHO (Season 13); ECHO (Season 8–Season 13); AURA (Season 6–7)
- Divisions: Mobile Legends: Bang Bang
- Founded: 24 June 2020; 6 years ago (as ECHO Philippines); 21 May 2024; 2 years ago (as Team Liquid)
- Location: Southeast Asia
- Colors: Dark Blue; Grey
- Manager: Mitch Liwanag
- Captain: Alston "Sanji" Pabico
- Championships: 5 (MPL-PH Series); 1 (M-series); 1 (MSC)
- Mascot: Horse
- Official fan club: The Cavalry
- Partners: Xiaomi; David's Salon; Red Bull; Lawson; Sunnies Studios
- Parent group: Team Liquid

Team Liquid Philippines, (formerly known as: AURA Philippines and ECHO Philippines, abbreviated as TLPH or TL and stylized as Team Liquid PH) is a Southeast Asian based esports team under the franchise of Team Liquid, a Dutch-based organization. The team currently participates as a professional and amateur Mobile Legends: Bang Bang team for MPL Philippines and MDL Philippines, respectively.

In 2024, Team Liquid acquired a majority stake on the Indonesian-based level STUN.GG which manages the rights of AURA Esports, the parent company of then-ECHO Philippines. Team Liquid has since rebranded the Filipino and Indonesian rosters for both MPL and MDL of AURA Esports, now rebranding the team names to include Liquid in its name.

== History ==
=== Aura Philippines ===
The franchise's early years began when they were known as Aura Philippines, a sister team to the Indonesian-based organization AURA Esports. The team joined MPL Philippines Season 6 when they acquired the championship roster of then SunSparks. According to Team Liquid SEA Director Daniel "DanSan" Santoso in a sit-down podcast with MLBB commentator Frederick "Mirko" Loho, AURA was chosen by team manager Mitch Liwanang. Also according to Santoso, the team were also in the communique with RRQ for a potential entry to MPL Philippines prior to the franchise leagues.

At the time, the team had the back-to-back championship roster of SunSparks that included veterans Killuash, Kielvj, Jaypee, Greed (now Baloyskie), and Rafflesia in their roster. They also had future Smart Omega Exp-Laner Renzio as their sixth-man and was coached by future-SRG head coach Michael Angelo "Arcadia" Bocado. The team played in Group A during Season 6 and finished second in the group with a group-best 10-3 record and a 20-12 game finish and a differential of +8. However, due to the pointing system rules during this season, the team only had 24 points to Execration's 25. The team failed to qualify for a deep play-off run, losing to ONIC Philippines in the Quarterfinals, 3-0.

The team, alongside AP Bren, Blacklist International, Onic Philippines, Smart Omega, and Execration, were invited at the inaugural Mobile Legends: Bang Bang Professional League Invitational, commonly known as MPLI. The team was drawn in the first round to their Indonesian-sister team AURA Fire where they won 2-1. The team went all the way to the Quarterfinals but lost in 3 games to the eventual runners-up Bren Esports.

The team would return for Season 7. However, Kielvj had left the team for Execration and Rafflesia was subbed to the sixth-man role when Renzio also left for Execration. Jaymark "Hadess" Lazaro replaced Kielvj while Jaypee transitioned from the mid-lane to the roam position. The team also signed Frederic "Bennyqt" Gonzales to the roster as their starting gold laner. The team finished 9-4 with a game record of 21-12, a differential of +9 and 26 points to top Group A by three points. Pitting themselves in the Upper Bracket Semifinals, Aura PH barely qualified for the Upper Bracket Final after a full five-game series against Smart Omega. They lost in four games against Blacklist International and was swept by Execration in the Lower Bracket Final.

=== ECHO Philippines ===
With MPL Philippines transitioning into a formal 8-team franchise system for Season 8, the Aura branding had been rebranded into ECHO Philippines. The team remained under the ownership of AURA Esports however, they are now competing as ECHO in MPL Philippines starting from Season 8. The team announced its roster with a ten-man rotation during this time. These included retained players such as Lazaro and Gonzales, the reintegration of Christian "Rafflesia" Fajura as the starting roamer for the team, a position left by Jaypee, and new additions including Jankrurt "KurtTzy" Seralvo who joined from Smart Omega, and Rion "Rk3" Kudo as their starting mid-laner. Additional players added included Invoker and Aspect as the team's bench Exp-Laner and Jungler, respectively, Aaron "Aaronqt" Lim as their bench mid-laner, Jason Rafael "Jay" Torculas and Kenneth "Flysolo" Coloma as their bench roamers. They were coached by Steve "Dale" Vitug and Michael Angelo "Arcadia" Bocado as head coach and assistant coach, respectively. Vitug joined the team in Season 7.

The team finished as the fifth seed with a 5-9 record, and a 13-18 game record at a differential of -5. They are tied with both RSG Philippines and Omega Esports for points at 16 however, RSG Philippines was the fourth seed because they won two more games over ECHO and Omega was the sixth seed due to them losing one more game that put ECHO as the fifth seed. In the upper bracket quarterfinals, they lost in four games against Smart Omega and was subsequently eliminated from the season.

==== KarlTzy, Yawi, and 3MarTzy arrival ====
In Season 9, the team went on a significant rebuilding process. Forming the dubbed "Super Team" for this season, the organization signed Tristan "Yawi" Cabrera, Karl Gabriel "KarlTzy" Nepomuceno, and Frediemar "3MarTzy" Serafico from Nexplay EVOS, Bren Esports, and TNC Pro Team, respectively. Nepomuceno, in a podcast with MPL commentator Caisam "Wolf" Nopueto, told the caster that he was not the targeted player to be bought out for the Jungler position, stating that the original idea was Kairi "Kairi" Rayosdelsol was the initial target however, he speculated that Rayosdelsol did not take the deal offered and returned to ONIC Philippines for that season. These entries pushed starters Hadess, Rk3, and Rafflesia to the bench as Serafico started as the Exp Laner, Seralvo moving to the mid-lane position, and Cabrera starting over Fajura as the roamer. Head coach Dale Vitug had left the team prior and Bocado became the head coach.

The team finished as the third seed with a 9-5 record. The team started in the quarterfinals where Smart Omega eliminated them in a 3-0 sweep.This was the last quarterfinals exit by the team prior to their dominance into the league.

==== First World Title and Rivalry with Blacklist International ====
In Season 10, Bocado had left for Rex Regum Qeon and he was replaced by Harold "Tictac" Gonzales as head coach and Robert "Trebor" Alexis as assistant coach. The team also acquired Sanford "Sanford" Vinuya and Alston "Sanji" Pabico as their starting exp-laner and mid-laner. Vinuya in particular, was signed from Nexplay EVOS. Serafico was moved to the bench alongside Seralvo. Furthermore, the team signed two more rookies in Justine "Zaida" Palma and Jhonville "Outplayed" Villar to the roster and re-signed former roamer Jay pee "Jaypee" dela Cruz as the substitute roamer. The team finished with the league best 10-4 record with a 22-13 game record and a game differential of +9. They were the second seed behind Blacklist International with a slightly worse 9-5 record but a 22-12, +10 game differential.

ECHO was pitted in the Upper Bracket Semifinals where they defeated defending champions RSG Philippines 3 games to 1 but lost in a 3-0 sweep over Blacklist International. In a rematch in the lower bracket, they again defeated the defending champions 3-1 to qualify for both the grand finals and an appearance at the MLBB M4 World Championship in Jakarta. Blacklist International won the Season 10 title in six games and formed the first team rivalry between Blacklist International and ECHO Philippines as it extended to the world championships.

In the world championships, ECHO Philippines topped their group stage going 3-0 over RRQ Hoshi, RSG Singapore, and Occupy Thrones. The team went up against Malaysian representatives Team HAQ that they narrowly defeated 3-2. They then won in four games over Onic Esports who had the services of former Onic Philippines Jungler Kairi, but was pushed to the lower brackets after a close five-game series against Blacklist International who were coming into the tournament as the defending world champions. In the lower-bracket finals, they pitted up against group-finalists RRQ Hoshi but the team won in four games over the home squad to setup fourth rematch against Blacklist International. The team would win their first world championship after sweeping Blacklist 4-0 in the grand finals. Frederic "Bennyqt" Gonzales won finals MVP.

With the beginning of the inaugural MDL Philippines season, the team had demoted most of their bench players to the MDL. The team then tied Season 11's match record with Bren Esports at 11-3 however, Bren was the first seed due to their number of 2-0 wins that pushed them to 31 points to ECHO's 29. The team was the second seed with a +12 differential. The team faced an early setback when they lost in five games against RSG Slate Philippines. They would proceed to win in four games against Bren Esports in the lower bracket semifinals and staged their revenge in a back-and-forth five-game series against RSG Slate in the lower bracket final, setting up their fifth and final grand finals against Blacklist International. The team won their first domestic title after sweeping Blacklist International 4-0 in the finals.

They qualified to their first Southeast Asia Cup in Cambodia as the champions of MPL Philippines. The team topped their group with a 2-0 record coming into the knockout stage. They won in four games over Malaysian representatives TODAK but lost in a 3-0 sweep against eventual champions Onic Esports. In the third place match, they won the bronze over home-team BURN x FLASH in five games. This effectively ended the team's pit for a Golden Road.

In Season 12, the team made a controversial decision to promote their former starting roamer as Aura Philippines Jay pee "Jaypee" Dela Cruz and start over Cabrera. Cabrera was sidelined to the bench while Dela Cruz became the starting roamer. Despite the roster changes, the team managed to secure the first seed with an 11-3 record and a +13 game differential with 30 points. The team faced its first setback when they lost in four games to Blacklist International in the upper bracket semifinals. They won in four games against RSG Philippines but again lost to Blacklist in the lower bracket finals in four games. This stopped the team's pit for a back-to-back title race in M5 due to this loss.

=== Team Liquid ===
==== Rebrand to Liquid ECHO ====
Prior to the start of Season 13, Team Liquid acquired the parent company of AURA Esports which rebranded ECHO Philippines to Team Liquid Philippines however, due to the time of the event occurring, the team played as "Liquid ECHO" for one season before properly transitioning to their branding as Team Liquid PH. The team also played as ECHO Philippines during the regular season. The team finished with a 9-5 record and a +9 game differential, and 30 points for the second seed. In the reprised "King of the Hill" playoff stage, the team was not affected whatsoever as the second seed. The team swept RSG Philippines in the Upper Bracket Semifinals and won a close five-game series against then-defending world champions Falcons AP.Bren. They would meet again for a rematch in the grand finals and Liquid ECHO won their second MPL title in a 4-0 sweep.

Qualifying for the 2024 MLBB Mid Season Cup, the team continued playing as "Liquid ECHO." They topped their group with a 3-0-0 match record and a 6-0 sweep. The team pitted against Myanmar representatives Falcon Esports who were the second-seed for their group. They won in four games. They again faced off against Falcons AP.Bren in their third rematch but Liquid ECHO lost to the defending champions in four games.

The team had certain roster changes including the departure of Outplayed who was their back-up gold laner at the time for Blacklist International. Now competing as Team Liquid PH, the team finished as the fifth seed with an 8-6 record and a +2 GD. This was their worst performance prior to the rebrand and their worst performance as a franchise since ECHO's debut in Season 8. The team started in the play-in tournament and they lost in five games over Aurora Gaming PH. This was also their worse performance in the playoffs since their last early exit in the first round in Season 9.

==== Season 15 ====
Team Liquid PH signed former Falcons Esports Head Coach Rodel "Ar Sy" Cruz as the team's newest head coach following longtime coach Harold "Tictac" Reyes transition to the management as one of the team's managers. The team built up more success for Season 15, going 12–2 in the regular season, tying that of former grand finalists Aurora Gaming. The team would then win in five games over Team Falcons PH in the semis, get swept by defending champions ONIC Philippines in the upper bracket final, and win in six games over a rematch against Team Falcons PH to get their fourth Grand Finals berth since 2020. The team would qualify with ONIC Philippines to MSC 2025 and the team would win their third title in the grand finals, defeating ONIC PH in all seven games. They now tie Blacklist International with the most MPL Philippines titles in league history. Moreover, they are the first team to have won MPL titles in odd-numbered seasons in Season 11, Season 13, and Season 15.

Team Liquid PH was nominated for "Best Esports Team" at The Game Awards 2025, but did not win.

After winning their third title in MPL Philippines Season 17 as the first team to go on a three-peat, they qualified for the 2026 MLBB Mid Season Cup in Paris, France as the defending champions. However, the team lost two games consecutively that eliminated them early in the group stages, losing to Turkish Champions Aurora Gaming and AMER champions Entity7. Their early exit from the tournament became a massive shock to the community.

=== SIBOL ===
Team Liquid PH has competed in numerous qualification tournaments to represent the country in the IESF World Championships and the SEA Games. In the 2025 Qualification for IESF 2025, TLPH player Sanford "Sanford" Vinuya was picked up as a substitute Exp Laner for Team Falcons PH, the representatives of the Philippines for IESF alongside Grant "Kelra" Pillas as their substitute Gold Laner. Team Liquid PH would be the country's representatives for the 33rd Southeast Asian Games with John Carlo "Caloy" Roma as the team's substitute.

== Awards ==
On July 15, ECHO took home the Mobile Team of the Year award during the Mobile Gaming Awards 2023 in Los Angeles, California. Besides the team's overall recognition, their gold laner Benedict "BennyQT" Gonzales also received the Mobile Player of the Year trophy, besting top-tier players like PUBG's Harsh "Goblin" Paudwal and Burenbayar "TOP" Altangerel, Clash Royale's Moamed "Mahamed Light" Tarek, Free Fire's Ratchanon "Moshi" Kunrayason, and Jeong "TENSAI" Seung-jin.

=== Seasons summary ===
==== MPL Philippines ====
ECHO Philippines
Year	Season	League	Record		Win Rate		Seed	Final Placement	ESL Snapdragon					MLBB Mid Season Cup	MPLI Invitational	MLBB World Championship
Year	Season	League	Game	Match	Game	Match	Seed	Final Placement	OQ1	OQ2	CS	CF	MM	MLBB Mid Season Cup	MPLI Invitational	MLBB World Championship
2021	S8	MPL PH	6-8	15-18	.429	.455	5th	5th-6th Place; 1-3 Smart Omega	—N/a					—N/a	9th-12th Place; 1-2 AURA Esports	—
2022	S9	MPL PH	8-6	19-13	.571	.594	3rd	5th-6th Place; 1-3 Smart Omega	—N/a					Did not qualify	9th-12th Place; 1-2 EVOS Legends	Champions; 4-0 Blacklist International
2022	S10	MPL PH	10-4	24-13	.714	.649	2nd	First Runner Up; 2-4 Blacklist International	—N/a					Did not qualify	9th-12th Place; 1-2 EVOS Legends	Champions; 4-0 Blacklist International
2023	S11	MPL PH	11-3	23-11	.786	.676	2nd	Champions; 4-0 Blacklist International	—N/a					Second Runner Up; 3-2 BURN X FLASH	First Runner Up; 1-3 RSG Philippines	Did not qualify
2023	S12	MPL PH	11-3	23-10	.786	.697	1st	Second Runner Up; 1-3 Blacklist International	—N/a					Second Runner Up; 3-2 BURN X FLASH	First Runner Up; 1-3 RSG Philippines	Did not qualify
Liquid ECHO
2024	S13	MPL PH	9-5	21-12	.643	.636	2nd	Champions; 4-0 Falcons AP Bren	—	—	5th	2nd	—	3rd-4th Place; 1-3 Falcons AP Bren	Defunct	Did not qualify
Team Liquid PH
2024	S14	MPL PH	8-6	17-15	.571	.531	5th	5th-6th Place; 2-3 Aurora Gaming	—	—	9th- 12th	—	—	3rd-4th Place; 1-3 Falcons AP Bren	Defunct	Did not Qualify
2025	S15	MPL PH	12-2	26-8	.857	.765	1st	Champions; 4-3 ONIC Philippines	—	—	9th- 12th	—	—	Champions; 4-1 Selangor Red Giants; OG Esports	Defunct	Second Runner Up; 2-3 Alter Ego Esports
2025	S16	MPL PH	9-5	21-12	.643	.636	3rd	Champions; 4-0 Aurora Gaming	—	—	9th- 12th	—	—	Champions; 4-1 Selangor Red Giants; OG Esports	Defunct	Second Runner Up; 2-3 Alter Ego Esports
2026	S17	MPL PH	13-1	27-6	.929	.818	1st	Champions; 4-2 Team Falcons PH	–					Group Stage; 0-2 Entity7	Defunct	Did not Qualify
2026	S18	MPL PH	12-2	25-6	.857	.806	1st	Second Runner Up; 3-4 Aurora Gaming PH	–					Group Stage; 0-2 Entity7	Defunct	Did not Qualify

==== MDL Philippines ====
ECHO Proud
Year	Season	League	Phase	Record		Win Rate		Seed	Final Placement
Year	Season	League	Phase	Game	Match	Game	Match	Seed	Final Placement
2023	S1	MDL PH	—	10-3	23-9	.769	.719	1st	Champions; 3-1 GameLab
2023	S2	MDL PH	—	10-1	20-6	.909	.769	1st	Champions; 3-1 Omega Neos
2024	S3	MDL PH	—	5-4	12-10	.556	.545	5th	First Runner Up; 2-3 RRQ Kaito
Team Liquid PH Academy
2024	S4	MDL PH	—	7-4	16-9	.636	.640	5th	3rd-4th Place; 1-2 Lazy Esports
2025	S5	MDL PH	Group Stage	3-0-0	6-0	1.000	1.000	1st	9th-16th Place; 1-2 TNC x Voltes PH
2025	S5	MDL PH	Seeding	2-1	4-3	.667	.571	2nd	9th-16th Place; 1-2 TNC x Voltes PH
2025	S5	MDL PH	Knockouts	—	—	—	—	—	9th-16th Place; 1-2 TNC x Voltes PH
2025	S6	MDL PH	Group Stage	2-1-0	5-1	.667	.833	2nd	9th-12th Place;; 1-3 Aurora Hunters
2025	S6	MDL PH	Seeding	2-0	4-1	1.000	.800	1st	9th-12th Place;; 1-3 Aurora Hunters
2025	S6	MDL PH	Knockouts	1-1	3-3	.500	.500	10th	9th-12th Place;; 1-3 Aurora Hunters
2026	S7	MDL PH	Group Stage	2-3	5-7	.400	.417	4th	9th-10th Place; 2–3 TNC x Voltes PH

== Rosters ==
Team Liquid PH rosters

Mobile Legends: Bang Bang Team Liquid PH
Handle	Name	Nationality
Sanford	Vinuya, Sanford	Philippines
KarlTzy	Nepomuceno, Karl Gabiel	Philippines
Sanji	Pabico, Alston	Philippines
Teddy	Viaña, Dave	Philippines
Jaypee	Dela Cruz, Jaypee Gonzales	Philippines
Daiki	Sebanes, Kim	Philippines

Mobile Legends: Bang Bang Team Liquid Academy PH
Handle	Name	Nationality
Kram	Roblas, Mark Cesar	Philippines
Leix	Feria, Lei Kenneth	Philippines
Starboy	Sombilla, Edsley Andrei	Philippines
Cull	Salinda, Wilburt	Philippines
Dameon	Yabo, Reo	Philippines
Santi	Noble, Santi Flores	Philippines
JNAG	Nunag, Julius	Philippines

Mobile Legends: Bang Bang Team Liquid PH Aqua
Handle	Name	Nationality
Daiki	Cruz, Ventanilla Allyson	Philippines
Ramici	Ramos, Trinity Christina	Philippines
Zaishii	Gilhang, Zaira	Philippines
CLA	Cordova, Clarisse Nicole	Philippines
Soju	Ramos, Kyla	Philippines
Blanche	Reyes, Hazel Kristine	Philippines

Legend:
- (I) Inactive
- (S) Suspended
- (L) On loan
- (2W) Two-way player
- Substitute
- (injured) Injury / Illness

Awards and achievements
Preceded by Blacklist International	MLBB World Championship winner 2022	Succeeded by AP Bren
Preceded by Selangor Red Giants OG Esports	MLBB Mid Season Cup winner 2025	Succeeded by Team Spirit
Preceded by Blacklist International	MPL Philippines champions (As ECHO Philippines); Season 11	Succeeded by AP Bren
Preceded by AP Bren	MPL Philippines champions (As Team Liquid PH); Season 13	Succeeded by Fnatic ONIC PH
Preceded by ONIC Philippines; Themselves	MPL Philippines champions Season 15; Season 16; Season 17	Succeeded by Aurora Gaming
