= Philippines national MLBB team =

Philippines
- Full name: Philippines national Mobile Legends: Bang Bang team
- Nicknames: Team Sibol
- Game: Mobile Legends: Bang Bang
- Founded: 2019
- Colors: Blue; Red; Yellow; White
- National association: Philippine Esports Organization

The Philippines national Mobile Legends: Bang Bang team is the esports team of the Philippines for Mobile Legends: Bang Bang (MLBB). They represent the country in MLBB tournaments for national teams.

== History ==
When esports was introduced as a medal sport at the SEA Games in the 2019 edition, host Philippines organized national teams which were given the moniker "Sibol" under the auspices of the Philippine Southeast Asian Games Esports Union (PSEU). Among the video game titles featured was Moonton's Mobile Legends: Bang Bang (MLBB).

== Tournaments ==
=== IESF World Championship ===
The Philippines won the MLBB gold medal at the 2023 IESF World Championship in Romania. The team led by AP Bren players defeated Indonesia in the final.

=== SEA Games ===
The Philippine MLBB men's team, consisting a core of Team Adroit players, won the first its first ever gold medal at the 2019 SEA Games MLBB event. They defended their title in the 2021 edition in Vietnam and the 2023 edition in Cambodia, and 2025 edition in Thailand.

A women's team also took part in the 2023 and 2025 editions, finishing as silver medalists.

=== Asian Games ===
Sibol participated in the esports tournament of the 2026 Asian Games in Aichi and Nagoya, Japan. The took part in the MLBB qualifiers in Singapore and earned a berth in the Asian Games.

The Phiilippine team topped their group by winning against Jordan and Kazakhstan. However, they were eliminated in the quarterfinals by Indonesia.

== Current rosters ==
=== 2026 Asian Games - men's team ===
2026 Asian Games Team Philippines Mobile Legends: Bang Bang roster
Players
Coaches

Role	Name	Team
EXP Laner	Sanford Vinuya	(Philippines) Liquid
Jungler	Karl Nepomuceno	(Philippines) Liquid
Mid Laner	Alston Pabico	(Philippines) Liquid
Gold Laner	Dave Viaña	(Philippines) Liquid
Roamer	Jaypee Delos Reyes	(Philippines) Liquid
Gold Laner	Grant Duane Pillas	(Philippines) Onic ID

Head coach

Alec Monsseur Alvarado

Assistant coach(es)

Denver Miranda (Note: Officially Supporting coach)
Michael Angelo Bocado
Francis Glindro

Legend

- Team – describes last
  team before the tournament

=== 2026 Esports Nation Cup ===
2026 Esports Nations Cup Team Philippines Mobile Legends: Bang Bang roster
Players
Coaches

Role	Name	Team
EXP Laner	David Canon	(Philippines) Falcons
Jungler	Karl Nepomuceno	(Philippines) Liquid
Mid Laner	Alston Pabico	(Philippines) Liquid
Gold Laner	Marco Stephen Requitiano	(Philippines) Falcons
Roamer	Jaypee Delos Reyes	(Philippines) Liquid
Gold Laner	Grant Duane Pillas	(Philippines) Onic ID
Jungler	Kairi Rayosdelsol	(Philippines) Onic ID

Head coach

Francis Glindro

Legend

- Team – describes last
  team before the tournament

== Medalists ==
=== Men's ===
Medal	Competition	Players							Coach	Ref.
Gold	(Philippines) 2019 SEA Games	Angelo Kyle Arcangel (Pheww)	Jeniel Bata-anon (Haze)	Allan Castromayor (Lusty)	Carlito Ribo (Ribo)	Jason Torculas (Jay)	Kenneth Villa (Kenji)	—N/a	Brian Lim (Panda)	
Gold	(Vietnam) 2021 SEA Games	Dexter Alaba (Dex Star)	Danerie Rosario (Wise)	Lee Howard Gonzales (Owl)	Salic Imam (Hadji)	Aniel Jiandan (Master The Basics)	Kyle Dominic Soto (Dominic)	Johnmar Villaluna (OhmyV33NUS)	Kristoffer Ricaplaza (Bon Chan)	
Gold	(Cambodia) 2023 SEA Games	Angelo Kyle Arcangel (Pheww)	David Canon (Flaptzy)	Nowee Macasa (Ryota)	Marco Requitano (Super Marco)	Michael Sayson (KyleTzy)	Rowgien Unigo (Owgwen)	—N/a	Francis Glindro (Ducky)	
Gold	(Thailand) 2025 SEA Games	Jaypee Dela Cruz (Jaypee)	Karl Nepomuceno (KarlTzy)	Alston Pabico (Sanji)	John Carlo Roma (Caloy)	Kiel Soriano (Oheb)	Sanford Vinuya (Sanford)	—N/a	Rodel Cruz (Ar Sy)	

=== Women's ===
Medal	Competition	Players						Coach	Ref.
Silver	(Cambodia) 2023 SEA Games	Kaye Alpuerto (Keishi)	Rica Amores (Amoree)	Alexandria Dardo (Lexaaa)	Gwyneth Diagon (Not Ayanami)	Sheen Perez (Shinoa)	Mery Vivero (Meraaay)	Abraham Unida (Coach Bam)	
Silver	(Thailand) 2025 SEA Games	Kaye Alpuerto (Keishi)	Rica Amores (Amoree)	Clarisse Cordova (CLA)	Gwyneth Diagon (Not Ayanami)	Sheen Perez (Shinoa)	Mery Vivero (Meraaay)	Salman Macarambon (KingSalman)	

== Head coaches ==
Men's

Coach	Handle	Nationality	Tournament/s	Notes	Ref.
Brian Lim	Panda	South Korea	2019 SEA Games		
Kristoffer Ricaplaza	Bon Chan	Philippines	2021 SEA Games		
Francis Glindro	Ducky	Philippines	2023 SEA Games		
Rodel Cruz	Ar Sy	Philippines	2025 SEA Games		
Tony Senedrin	YnoT	Philippines	—N/a	February–March 2026	
Allec Alvarado	SN4P	Philippines	2026 Asian Games Qualifiers	From March 2026; for the 2026 Asian Games	

Women's

Coach	Handle	Nationality	Tournament/s	Notes	Ref.
Abraham Unida	Coach Bam	Philippines	2023 SEA Games		
Salman Macarambon	KingSalman	Philippines	2025 SEA Games		
