= Philippines national esports team =

Philippines
- Full name: Philippines national esports team
- Nicknames: Team Sibol
- Sport: Esports
- Founded: 2017
- Colors: Blue; Red; Yellow; White
- National association: Philippine Esports Organization
- Head coach: Ralph Andrei Llabres (Leathergoods)
- Main sponsor: Smart Communications
- Games: (see below)

The Philippines national esports team, nicknamed Sibol (stylized as SIBOL), represents the Philippines in international esports tournaments. It is organized under the Philippine Esports Organization.

== History ==
A national esports team representing the Philippines took part in the 2017 Asian Indoor and Martial Arts Games in Turkmenistan, where the esports was held as a demonstration event. The Philippines did not have any esports representatives at the 2018 Asian Games in Indonesia, where it was likewise held as a demonstration event.

When the Philippines hosted the 2019 Southeast Asian Games, it organized esports as a medal sport. A national esports team, under the moniker "Sibol," was formalized by the Philippine Southeast Asian Games Esports Union (PSEU) for the purpose of the Philippines' participation in the regional games as hosts. The PSEU consists of officials of the National Electronic Sports Federation of the Philippines (NESFP) and the Esports National Association of the Philippines (ESNAP). Sibol fielded teams in all six events.

In 2020, the Philippine Esports Organization (PESO) was recognized by the Philippine Olympic Committee (POC) as the national sports association for esports in the Philippines. This recognition was disputed by the NESFP, which was involved in the PSEU. The other involved organization, ESNAP, already merged with PESO.

Sibol took part again in the 2021 Southeast Asian Games in Vietnam, where esports returned as a medal event. It intends to compete in all titles at the regional games. A national selection tournaments were held for each title, wherein the winning team from each selection would form the core of the Sibol lineup for their respective event. The qualifiers ended on February 28, 2022, and a total of 55 esports athletes represented the country. The campaign ended with two gold and two silver medals; which was considered as a success by PESO.

The team took part in the 2023 Southeast Asian Games and the 2023 ASEAN Para Games in Cambodia.

They made their Asian Games debut in the 2022 edition held in Hangzhou in September 2023 where esports was held as a regular event for the first time. Sibol did not win any medal.

At the 2026 Asian Games in Aichi and Nagoya, Japan, the Philippine team won bronze medals in Pokémon Unite and Honor of Kings.

== Team image ==
The Philippine esports team is also known as Team Sibol (stylized as SIBOL). The name "sibol" comes from the Filipino word for growth. The team logo is in red, yellow, and blue. The shape of the logo forms the abbreviation for the country, "PHI," in a form that could represent a leaf or a flame.

== Titles ==
The Philippine esports team has fielded teams and/or players for the following titles.

- Arena of Valor – 2019 SEAG, 2022 Asiad
- Crossfire – 2021 SEAG
- Dream Three Kingdoms 2 – 2022 Asiad
- Dota 2 – 2017 AIMAG*, 2019 SEAG, 2022 Asiad
- EA Sports FC Online / FIFA Online – 2021 SEAG, 2022 Asiad
- Hearthstone – 2017 AIMAG*, 2019 SEAG
- The King of Fighters – 2017 AIMAG*
- League of Legends – 2021 SEAG
- League of Legends: Wild Rift – 2021 SEAG
- Mobile Legends: Bang Bang – 2019 SEAG, 2021 SEAG, IeSF 2022 (details)
- PUBG Mobile / Peacekeeper Elite – 2021 SEAG, 2022 Asiad
- Starcraft II – 2017 AIMAG*, 2019 SEAG
- Street Fighter V – 2022 Asiad
- Tekken 7 – 2019 SEAG

(*) Demonstration event

== Competitive record ==
=== Asian Games ===
Host/Year	Total			
Host/Year	Gold medal	Silver medal	Bronze medal	Total
(China) 2022	0	0	0	0
(Japan) 2026	0	0	2	2
Total	0	0	2	2

=== Southeast Asian Games ===
Host/Year	Total			
Host/Year	Gold medal	Silver medal	Bronze medal	Total
(Philippines) 2019	7	4	4	15
(Vietnam) 2021	2	2	0	4
(Cambodia) 2023	2	1	3	6
(Thailand) 2025	1	1	0	2
Total	8	5	4	27

Medal events only

== See also ==
- Philippines national MLBB team
