= Esports in the Philippines =

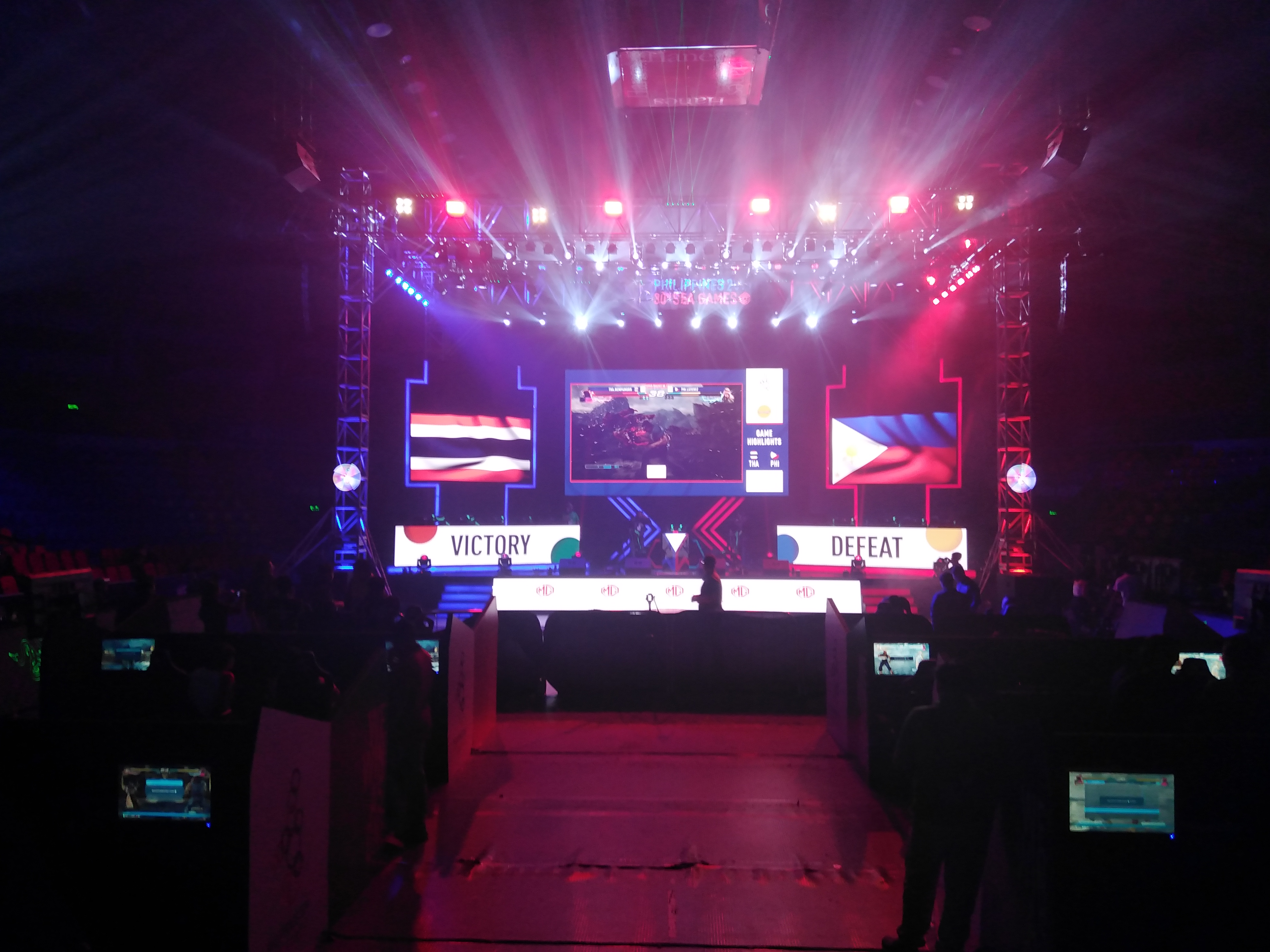
- Esports match during the 2019 Southeast Asian Games.
- Country: Philippines
- Governing body: Philippine Esports Organization
- National team: Philippines national esports team

Club competitions
- See below

International competitions
- Club Mobile Legends: Bang Bang World Championship National team Southeast Asian Games

Esports in the Philippines refers to competitive video gaming or esports in the Philippines. This article covers both amateurs and professional levels.

== History ==
From the 2000s to the early 2010s, video game tournaments in the Philippines have been largely amateur often held in internet cafés in Metro Manila. Video gaming was widely seen as just for leisure or past-time and not seen as a credible means for a professional career. Among popular video game titles featured in tournaments around this period are Dota 2 and Counter-Strike.

The Philippine Esports Organization (PeSO), which would govern esports in the country would be established in 2011. Filipinos would eventually become esports athletes and professional esports teams would be organized to compete in international competitions.

In 2017, the state agency Games and Amusements Board recognized esports as a legitimate sport.

The Philippines would introduce esports as a medal event in the 2019 Southeast Asian Games which it hosted. This would be the first time esports would feature in an event that also featured traditional sports. PESO would also formally organize a national esports team for the occasion which was given the moniker "Sibol". Esports would be subsequently featured in succeeding editions of the regional games.

The rise of the availability of smartphones and mobile internet would cause the increased popularity of mobile game titles for esports by the early 2020s such as Mobile Legends and PUBG Mobile.

== Sports body and regulation ==
The Philippine Esports Organization (PeSO) is an esports body that represents the country officially to the International eSports Federation (IeSF), which is one of the largest esports associations in the world. The organization is a member of the Philippine Olympic Committee since 2020.

Professional esports athletes in the Philippines are also required to secure a license from the Games and Amusements Board.

== Competitions ==
The following are professional esports tournaments and leagues that are organized in the Philippines.

- The Nationals
- MPL Philippines
- PBA Esports Bakbakan

== See also ==
- Internet in the Philippines
- Video games in the Philippines
- GG: Good Game (2024)
