= Esports at the SEA Games =

Esports was introduced as one of the main medal events in the Southeast Asian Games during the 2019 edition held in the Philippines. Since 2019, Esports has become one of the main events during the biennial event due to the level of competition between opposing teams and the selection of games during the main event.

Notable games include: Mobile Legends: Bang Bang, League of Legends, League of Legends: Wild Rift and PUBG Mobile to name a few.

== History ==
Esports was first introduced in the 2019 Southeast Asian Games in the Philippines. The tournament featured six disciplines during the event which including four MOBA disciplines, one Fighting game and one Digital Card Game in Tekken 7 and Hearthstone, respectively.

Esports would carry on to become another medal event for the succeeding 2021 and 2023 editions of the games held in Vietnam and Cambodia, respectively.

== Editions ==
Year	Edition	Host country	No. of events	Best nation
2019	XXX	Philippines	6 (Dota 2, StarCraft II, Hearthstone, Tekken 7, Arena of Valor, Mobile Legends: Bang Bang)	Philippines
2021	XXXI	Vietnam	10 (FIFA Online 4, League of Legends, Crossfire, League of Legends: Wild Rift, Arena of Valor, PUBG Mobile, Garena Free Fire, Mobile Legends: Bang Bang)	Vietnam
2023	XXXII	Cambodia	9 (Crossfire, League of Legends: Wild Rift, PUBG Mobile, Mobile Legends: Bang Bang, Mission Against Terror, Valorant)	Indonesia
2025	XXXIII	Thailand	6 (Arena of Valor, Mobile Legends: Bang Bang, Garena Free Fire, EA Sports FC Online)	Thailand; Vietnam

== Events ==
=== Titles ===
Twelve video game titles have been featured as part of the Esports event in the Southeast Asian Games.

Video game title	Platform	Genre
Attack Online 2	PC	First-person shooter
Crossfire	PC	First-person shooter
Dota 2	PC	Multiplayer online battle arena
EA Sports FC Online (Formerly FIFA Online 4)	PC	Sports
Starcraft II	PC	Real-time strategy
Garena Free Fire	Mobile	Battle royale, Third-person shooter
Hearthstone	PC	Card game
League of Legends	PC	Multiplayer online battle arena
League of Legends: Wild Rift	Mobile	Multiplayer online battle arena
PUBG Mobile	Mobile	Battle royale, Third-person shooter
Arena of Valor	Mobile	Multiplayer online battle arena
Mobile Legends: Bang Bang	Mobile	Multiplayer online battle arena
Tekken 7	Console	Fighting game
Valorant	PC	First-person shooter

=== Summary by edition ===
==== Console ====
Event	19	21	23	25	Years
Tekken 7	X				1

==== Mobile ====
Event	19	21	23	25	Years
Arena of Valor	X	X		X	3
Garena Free Fire		X		X	2
League of Legends: Wild Rift		X	X		2
PUBG Mobile		X	X		2
Mobile Legends: Bang Bang	X	X	X	X	4

==== PC ====
Event	19	21	23	25	Years
Attack Online 2			X		1
Crossfire		X	X		2
Dota 2	X				1
EA Sports FC Online (Formerly FIFA Online 4)		X		X	2
Starcraft II	X				1
Hearthstone	X				1
League of Legends		X			1
Valorant			X		1

== Medal tally ==
Overall esports medal tally
Rank	Nation	Gold	Silver	Bronze	Total
1	Philippines (PHI)	7	4	4	15
2	Indonesia (INA)	5	7	1	13
3	Vietnam (VIE)	5	5	7	17
4	Thailand (THA)	4	3	5	12
5	Cambodia (CAM)	3	1	1	5
6	Malaysia (MAS)	1	2	6	9
7	Singapore (SGP)	1	2	5	8
8	Laos (LAO)	0	0	1	1
8	Myanmar (MYA)	0	0	1	1
Totals (9 entries)		26	24	31	81
