= Ducky (coach) =

Filipino e-sports coach

Personal information
- Name: Francis Glindro
- Nickname(s): Duckey, Duckeyyy

Current team
- Team: Team Falcons PH
- Role: Head coach
- Game: Mobile Legends: Bang Bang
- League: MPL Philippines

Career information
- Coaching career: 2018–present

Team history
- 2018–2019: REVO / EVOS Legends
- 2020–2025: AP Bren
- 2026–present: Team Falcons PH

Career highlights and awards
- 3x World champion (M1, M2, M5); 2x MPL Philippines champion (S6, S12); MPL Philippines Hall of Fame inductee
Medal record
Esports
Head coach for Philippines
SEA Games
Gold medal – first place	2023 Cambodia	MLBB

Francis Glindro, known professionally as Ducky (Note: Alternatively spelled as Duckey or Duckeyyy), is a Filipino esports coach in Mobile Legends: Bang Bang.

== Early life and education ==
Francis Glindro pursued a degree in nursing at the Sacred Heart College in his home province of Quezon. He originally wanted to become a doctor and study biology at the University of Santo Tomas.

He became a registered nurse having passed the board examinations. However he did not work as a nurse and instead worked at a call center in Manila. He was later recruited to a friend's accounting firm despite his lack of background in finance and worked there in seven years and got promoted multiple times to a management position.

== Career ==
=== Early years ===
As a sideline gig, Glindro played Dota 2 and earned money by competing with players at the University Belt in Manila. He shifted to Mobile Legends: Bang Bang (MLBB) in a search for a game that would not require him to commute to computer shops to play. He later became associated with the esports organization Digital Devils.

=== EVOS Legends ===
Glindro who became known under the handle "Ducky" had his first official coaching job was with REVO Esports. Ducky quit his accounting job in 2018 to fly to Indonesia. The team finished as runners-up of Seasons 1 and 2 of MPL Indonesia. In 2019, REVO Esports was dissolved and absorbed to EVOS Legends. Glindro was tasked to manage the newly merged team. He led EVOS to the inaugural Mobile Legends: Bang Bang World Championship (M1) title.

=== AP Bren ===
Ducky became coach of AP Bren for Season 5 of the MPL Philippines. The team finished third in his debut tournament. However the team was able to win Season 6. Duckly later led AP Bren to the M2 World Championship winning against the Burmese Ghouls in the final in January 2021. However after that tournament, the team had missed the playoffs of the MPL Philippines until Season 9.

He later secured AP Bren's second MPL Philippines title in 2023 in Season 12 defeating Blacklist International in the final. AP Bren formed the core of the Philippine national team with Ducky as its coach which won the gold medal at the 2023 SEA Games in Cambodia. Ducky also helped AP Bren win its second world title by winning the M5 World Championship defeating Onic Philippines in the final in late 2023.

Ducky left AP Bren in February 2025 last coaching the team in MPL Philippines Season 14.

=== Team Falcons ===
Ducky was announced as the Southeast Asia Esports head of Saudi esports organization Team Falcons in May 2025.

He returned to coaching in 2026, when he was made head coach of Team Falcons for MPL Philippines' Season 17. He replaced Moody Samal who coached the team in Season 16.

== Honors ==
- MPL Philippines Hall of Legends inductee (2023)
