= Pheww =

Filipino professional esports player

Personal information
- Nickname: Kids' Idol
- Born: Angelo Kyle Dalagan Arcangel; Mandaluyong, Philippines
- Nationality: Filipino

Current team
- Team: Onic Philippines
- Role: Head coach
- Game: Mobile Legends: Bang Bang

Team history

As player:
- 2018: Digital Devils Pro
- 2018–2019: Cignal Ultra
- 2020–2024: AP.Bren
- 2025–2026: Team Falcons
- 2026: EVOS Esports (Note: On Loan)

As coach:
- 2026–present: Onic Philippines
Medal record
Esports
Representing Philippines
SEA Games
Gold medal – first place	2019 Philippines	MLBB
Gold medal – first place	2023 Cambodia	MLBB

Angelo Kyle Dalagan Arcangel, better known as Pheww, is a Filipino professional Mobile Legends: Bang Bang coach for Onic Philippines. He is best known for his time with AP.Bren (formerly Bren Esports), where he became a two-time M-Series World Champion (M2 and M5). Arcangel and KarlTzy are the only Mobile Legends player to win two Southeast Asian Games gold medals for the Philippines, with himself bagged gold in 2019 and 2023.

== Professional career ==
=== Early career ===
Arcangel began his professional esports career in 2018 during the inaugural season of the MPL Philippines. Playing for Digital Devils Pro alongside teammates such as John "Yakou" Magno, his team finished as the runners-up in Season 1, losing to Aether Main in the finals. Following this, he joined Cignal Ultra, where he played from Season 2 to Season 4. During his tenure with Cignal Ultra, Arcangel secured his first MPL championship title in Season 2.

=== Bren Esports / AP.Bren ===
==== 2020–2021: M2 World Championship ====
In 2020, Arcangel joined Bren Esports (later rebranded as AP.Bren). He was appointed team captain, a role in which he focused on discipline and punctuality, often arriving an hour early for training sessions. He credited the coaching staff, including Francis "Duckey" Glindro, for professionalizing their training system. In MPL PH Season 6, he led Bren Esports to the championship title.

In January 2021, Bren Esports competed in the M2 World Championship in Singapore. Arcangel expressed a desire to face the Indonesian team Alter Ego in the finals to avenge a 3–0 loss from the ONE Esports MPL Invitational. He noted that the team had prepared by scrimmaging against international teams to adapt to foreign playstyles. While they did not face Alter Ego in the final, Bren Esports defeated Burmese Ghouls to become the first Filipino team to win the World Championship.

==== 2021–2022: Slump and rebuilding ====
Following the M2 victory, the team struggled to maintain their form. In MPL PH Season 8, Bren Esports began with a franchise-worst 1–6 record, which Arcangel admitted caused low morale within the squad. The team failed to qualify for the playoffs in Seasons 8 and 9. Arcangel contemplated retirement during this period but chose to continue due to support from his family and partner.

In Season 10, Arcangel led a rebuilt roster to the semifinals. In a match against Omega Esports, he helped orchestrate a reverse sweep from an 0–2 deficit to win 3–2, recording a 5/1/7 KDA on the hero Gusion in Game 4.

==== 2023–2024: M5 World Championship ====
The team returned to prominence in 2023. Arcangel led AP.Bren to the MPL Philippines Season 12 title, sweeping Blacklist International 3–0 in the upper bracket finals to secure a spot at the M5 World Championship. He noted that the gameplay quality at M5 was significantly higher than in M2, requiring more complex team coordination. AP.Bren won the tournament, making Arcangel and teammate David "FlapTzy" Canon the second and third player to win two M-Series titles, and first for Pheww as captain in both occasions.

In 2024, the team placed second at the Mid Season Cup (MSC) in Riyadh, losing 3–4 to the Selangor Red Giants in the finals. Prior to the finals, they had eliminated fellow Filipino team Team Liquid Echo in the semifinals. Arcangel had correctly predicted an all-Filipino matchup in the latter stages of the tournament.

=== Team Falcons ===
In early 2025, following the expiration of their contracts with AP.Bren, Arcangel and the entire M5 roster transferred to Team Falcons. Arcangel stated that the players had agreed to move as a unit to preserve their chemistry.

In MPL Philippines Season 15, Arcangel became the first player in league history to record 3,000 career assists, a milestone achieved during a 2–0 sweep of TNC Pro Team. By March 2025, he also ranked third on the league's all-time kills leaderboard with 1,356 kills.

The team faced early difficulties in Season 16, holding a 1–5 record by Week 2. Following back-to-back losses, Arcangel admitted that team morale was low but emphasized the need for resilience. During this season, he also took on a mentorship role for rookie players like Edferdz "Ferdz" Fernandez, helping them manage competitive pressure.

=== EVOS Esports ===
In early 2026, Arcangel joined EVOS Esports on loan from Team Falcons after he was initially removed from active roster of his team prior to arrival of Salic "Hadji" Imam, M3 World Champion and former Smart Omega player. Prior to the announcement, EVOS accidentally posted in their social media early during the EVOS Parade 2026 that was held on March 1, 2026. In an interview with Dunia Games, he stated that the reason he joins EVOS because "it was one of the strongest team from the options he has (on the table)." He also added that he wants to keep growing after being with Flap, Kyle, Marco and Owgwen for so long. In a talk session with MPL Indonesia English desk caster, Frederick "Mirko" Handy Loho, he also has option to become coach in Indonesia but declined it as it was his last resort option.

Arcangel left EVOS after one season and returned briefly to Team Falcons PH under his loan agreement contract. Arcangel however, left Team Falcons PH thereafter.

== Coaching ==
=== Onic Philippines ===
Arcangel was named as the newest head coach for Onic Philippines, replacing head coach Jeniel "Haze" Bata-anon who was relegated as the assistant coach. This effectively ends Arcangel's playing career as a professional player as he transitions into coaching.

== National team career ==
Arcangel represented the Philippines at the 2019 Southeast Asian Games, where the national team (Sibol) won the inaugural esports gold medal for Mobile Legends.

In 2023, he was selected to captain the Sibol squad for the 2023 Southeast Asian Games in Cambodia. The roster was composed primarily of his Bren Esports teammates, excluding players from the reigning M4 champions, ECHO. Arcangel stated he felt no pressure as he had previous experience representing the country. The team won the gold medal by defeating Malaysia 3–0, making Arcangel the first two-time SEA Games gold medalist in the title. He attributed the victory to the team's strong chemistry compared to the 2019 roster.

Later that year, he was part of the Sibol team that won the 2023 IESF World Esports Championship, defeating Indonesia 3–1 in the finals.

== Player profile ==
Arcangel plays the mid laner role and is known for his leadership and shotcalling. His former teammate Karl "KarlTzy" Nepomuceno has described him as "very smart" in-game, highlighting his ability to call plays and adapt to different roles over the years. In 2023, he was nominated for Moonton's "10 Greatest Players" list.

He is noted for specific hero masteries:

- Selena: He recorded the first and only "Savage" (five consecutive kills) with this hero in MPL PH history.
- Bane: In Season 10, he utilized a magic damage build for Bane, which was considered an "off-meta" pick at the time, winning MVP honors for the performance.
- Julian: He utilizes an assassin-like playstyle for this hero, prioritizing burst damage.

To manage team communication, Arcangel implemented a co-captaincy system with teammate Rowgien "Owgwen" Unigo to ensure calm shotcalling during matches.

== Personal life ==
Arcangel is married to Icey Vallesteros, a content creator. The couple has been together for over six years. In 2024, Arcangel announced plans to use his tournament winnings to fund their wedding and start a business. They married in November 2024 at the Caleruega Chapel of Transfiguration. He has cited financial security and prize money as a significant motivation for his continued career in esports.
