= Datcroft Games =

International Game Developer and Publisher

- Industry: Video games
- Predecessor: Rusoftware, Datcroft Corporation
- Founded: 2004 as Rusoftware
- Headquarters: London, UK
- Area served: Russia EU
- Products: Fragoria; Pixel Wars; Treasure Master; Bravo Birds; Get the Gun; Legend of Khans
- Number of employees: 50 (as of 2019)
- Website: http://datcroft.com/

Datcroft Games is an international video game developer and publisher. The company was founded in 2004 with no involvement of external investors or institutional / VC funds. The Datcroft Games currently has more than 50 specialists working across 7 countries.

The company develops and publishes stand-alone large online games as well as mobile games for midcore and hardcore audience. The games are available in more than 20 languages worldwide and have been played by more than 10 million users.

A fantasy browser real-time MMORPG Fragoria with a long players’ lifetime has been flagship product of Datcroft Games for a long time. Before and after its launch, Fragoria has been in development for several years and it still keeps constantly being updated with new features. It is currently available in Flash and can be played directly in any browser or by downloading the client.

A new flagship product that has been under development for 2 years is Pixel Wars. It is a massive MMO Action game for the mobile market made in Unity engine. At this moment, the game is in the soft launch stage. Pixel Wars should be targeted at both midcore and hardcore audiences.

Besides, among the Datcroft Games projects there are such games as Treasure Master, Bravo Birds, Get the Gun, Legend of Khans.

The games of Datcroft are featured and distributed by leading media companies around the world, such as Mail.ru in Russia, ProSiebenSat.1 Media, Covus (Browsergames.de), Bigpoint Games (license expired) in Germany, Austria, Switzerland and France, Suba Games, WildTangent, Aeria Games in English language, Onet.pl, Wirtualna Polska, Axel Springer AG, Gadu-Gadu in Poland, Antenna TV in Greece, Minijuegos and OCI Group in Spain, Draugas in Lithuania.
