= Suba Games =

Video game publisher

Suba Games, LLC
- Company type: Subsidiary, limited liability company
- Website type: Video game publisher
- Available in: English
- Founded: August 14, 2008; 18 years ago
- Headquarters: Toronto, Canada
- Owner: Wicked Interactive Ltd.
- Industry: Video game development
- Website: www.subagames.com
- Registration: Optional (required to play downloaded games)
- Launched: August 2008; 18 years ago
- Current status: Online

Suba Games, LLC is an online games publisher. Launched in August 2008, Suba Games' first title was the North American launch of ACE Online. At about the same time, Suba Games also launched Priston Tale and Priston Tale 2 that came as a result from a strategic partnership with leading Korean publisher, Yedang Online. In August 2010, Suba Games brought the browser-based MMO, Fragoria, into the North American market. One month later, they launched their FPS, Mission Against Terror, into Open Beta.

== Notable games ==
- Ace Online
- DOMO (Dream of Mirror Online)
- Fragoria
- Mission Against Terror
- Pirate Galaxy
- Priston Tale
- Priston Tale 2
