= Magic Chess: Go Go =

- Developer: Moonton
- Publisher: Moonton
- Platforms: Android; iOS; Windows
- Release: MS and SG: 29 November 2024; AS: 21 February 2025; WW: 28 May 2025
- Genre: Auto battler
- Mode: Multiplayer

Magic Chess: Go Go (MCGG) is a multiplayer strategy auto battler mobile game developed and published by Moonton, a subsidiary of Savvy Games Group. The game derived from Mobile Legends: Bang Bang (MLBB). Released on iOS and Android, it had a soft launch in Malaysia and Singapore on 29 November 2024 before expanding to APAC region on 21 February 2025.

== Gameplay ==
MCGG is a tactical real time strategy PvP auto battler game involving eight players.

== Development and release ==
Magic Chess: Go Go (MCGG) is a derivative video game of Mobile Legends: Bang Bang (MLBB). Within the MLBB universe, MCGG is a famous game in the Land of Dawn, the main setting of MLBB developed by a "mysterious game designer". Hence MCGG's mechanics such as its commanders, Go Go Cards, and synergies relies heavily on MLBB lore. MLBB itself had Magic Chess as an in-game mode prior.

Released in both iOS and Android, MCGG had its soft launch in Malaysia and Singapore on 29 November 2024 before it was launched in Cambodia, Indonesia, Laos, Myanmar, the Philippines, and Thailand (APAC region) on 21 February 2025.

MCGG had its global release on 28 May 2025 with at least 20 million players participating in the pre-registration.

== Esports ==
MCGG was held as a demonstration event at esports tournaments of the 2025 SEA Games in Thailand.

Moonton will organize the GO1 World Championship, the first offline global tournament for MCGG in January 2026.
