= Moonton =

Video game developer

- Type: Subsidiary
- Industry: Video games
- Founded: 2014; 12 years ago
- Headquarters: Minhang District, Shanghai, China
- Area served: Worldwide
- Key people: Yunfan Zhang (CEO)
- Products: Mobile Legends: Bang Bang; Mobile Legends: Adventure; Magic Rush: Heroes; Watcher of Realms; Magic Chess: Go Go; Mob Rush; Silver and Blood; Acecraft
- Number of employees: 2,000+ (2025)
- Parent: ByteDance; Savvy Games Group
- Website: en.moonton.com

Shanghai Moonton Technology Co. Ltd. (Chinese: 上海沐瞳科技有限公司; pinyin: Shànghǎi Mùtóng Kējì Yǒuxiàn Gōngsī), commonly known as Moonton, is a Chinese video game company dedicated to gaming development, publication, and esports. The company operates offices in Indonesia, Malaysia, Singapore, Philippines, Latin America, Hong Kong, and mainland China, among other locations.

In October 2021, ByteDance acquired Moonton, which remained operating independently. In 2024, Yunfan Zhang became the CEO of Moonton.

Mobile Legends: Bang Bang (often abbreviated MLBB) is a mobile multiplayer online battle arena (MOBA) game developed by Moonton. As of 2025, it has been reported to have over 1.5 billion registered users and around 110 million monthly active players. The game has ranked among the top ten most-played mobile games in more than 80 countries. It is distributed globally and maintains an international esports presence with professional leagues and tournaments across multiple regions.The game marked its 10th anniversary in 2026 with celebrations across 10 countries in Asia, Europe, and Latin America.

In 2026, MLBB Esports will transition to a five-region structure—Southeast Asia (SEA); Eastern Europe and Central Asia (EECA); Europe, the Middle East and Africa (EMEA); East Asia (EA); and the Americas (AMER). This framework unifies the global MLBB Esports ecosystem while empowering each region through tailored infrastructure and talent development pathways.

The M7 World Championship, held January 3-25, 2026 in Jakarta, Indonesia, became the most-watched mobile esports tournament in history. According to Esports Charts, the Grand Finals reached over 5.68 million peak concurrent viewers—a new record for mobile esports. June 24, the MLBB Asian Games Qualifiers became the most-watched esports tournament in Asian Games history by generating 9.1 million hours watched, On July 18, the Grand Finals of MWI at EWC 26 reached over 565k peak concurrent users, setting a new record for EWC women's esports. Mobile Legends: Bang Bang (MLBB) Mid-Season Cup (MSC) also set a viewership record at the 2026 Esports World Cup (EWC), reaching 2.88 million peak concurrent viewers (PCV)—the highest figure of any tournament at EWC 2026.

== History ==
Moonton was launched in Shanghai, China in July 2014. The company's first commercial release came in April 2015 with Magic Rush: Heroes, a role-playing game that launched worldwide excluding the domestic Chinese market. Following the completion of Magic Rush: Heroes, Moonton began development for a multiplayer online battle arena (MOBA) game. Moonton launched Mobile Legends: Bang Bang (MLBB) in November 2016, released worldwide excluding mainland China. It became popular in Southeast Asia, notably in Indonesia, Philippines and Malaysia, where it was the most-downloaded free mobile game app among iPhone users in 2017. The game is distributed by Skystone in the United States.

In 2017, Moonton began building its esports ecosystem with its first MLBB offline esports tournament in Indonesia in May, followed by the inaugural MSC (MLBB Southeast Asia Cup) in September. In November 2017, the company launched the Mobile Legends Professional League (MPL) in Indonesia, Malaysia, and Singapore, expanding to the Philippines in March 2018 and Myanmar in February 2019.

The company established regional offices, opening its Singapore branch in May 2018 and Indonesian branch in October 2018. By April 2018, MLBB had exceeded 200 million total registered accounts, growing to over 1 billion cumulative downloads by October 2020, with peak monthly active users exceeding 100 million.

In August 2019, Moonton launched Mobile Legends: Adventure worldwide, excluding Japan, Korea, and mainland China.

In November 2019, the first Mobile Legends: Bang Bang Global Championship (M1) was held in Kuala Lumpur, Malaysia, with 16 teams participating from 14 countries.

In December 2019, MLBB officially became a medal sport at the 30th Southeast Asian Games, marking its recognition as a legitimate competitive sport in the region.

On March 22, 2021, ByteDance agreed to acquire gaming studio Moonton at a valuation of around $4 billion.

MPL expanded internationally to Brazil and Cambodia in July 2021. By August 2021, MLBB's total registered accounts exceeded 1 billion. The company diversified its content offerings, launching Legends of Dawn - The Sacred Stone, the first MLBB animation series in August 2021, which accumulated 360 million views in its first run across multiple platforms globally.

Mobile Legends: Adventure launched in Japan and South Korea in 2021 and reached the top position on the Apple App Store and Google Play free game charts in both countries. In the same year, MLBB ranked first globally in mobile esports viewing time, with an estimated 386 million hours watched.

In April 2023, Moonton commenced pre-registration for Watcher of Realms, a next-generation fantasy RPG game, with full platform launching in July 2023.

In January 2024, Moonton and the Esports World Cup Foundation signed a multi-year collaboration agreement, with MLBB selected as an inaugural game for the Esports World Cup. In October 2024, Watcher of Realms was launched in mainland China.

In January 2025, MLBB officially launched in mainland China, marking the game's entry into one of the world's largest gaming markets.

On March 26, 2025, Moonton announced that publishing operations for Mobile Legends: Bang Bang in the United States had transferred to Skystone Games, with a new U.S.-specific version of the game becoming available on March 27, 2025, following the temporary removal of the original version from U.S. app stores earlier in the year.

In November 2025, Moonton was announced as one of the official partners of the Esports Nations Cup, alongside companies including Chess.com and SNK, as part of the tournament’s commercial and competitive expansion.

In November 2025, MOONTON announced the first Magic Chess: Go Go (MCGG) annual tournament—the GO1 World Championship (GO1), marking the game's first offline global championship.

In January 2026, Moonton announced a five-region structure—Southeast Asia (SEA), Eastern Europe and Central Asia (EECA), Europe, the Middle East and Africa (EMEA), East Asia (EA), and the Americas (AMER). This framework unifies the global MLBB Esports ecosystem while empowering each region through tailored infrastructure and talent development pathways.

The Esports World Cup Foundation (EWCF) announced Mobile Legends: Bang Bang (MLBB) as the first of the 16 world-class titles that national teams will compete in at the inaugural Esports Nations Cup 2026 (ENC), taking place in Riyadh, Saudi Arabia, in November. MLBB will also debut as a medalled event at the 20th Asian Games Aichi-Nagoya 2026, one of the region's largest sporting events.

In February 2026, it was announced that ByteDance was in talks with Savvy Games Group to sell Moonton to the company.

On March 18, 2026, Moonton celebrated a new record high in daily active users (DAU) for Mobile Legends: Bang Bang.

In May, 2026, MOONTON Games secured two Grand Winner titles at 2026 NYX Game Awards in both the Mobile Game - Best Music and Mobile Game - Best Audio Design categories for MLBB.

In October 2026, Mobile Legends: Bang Bang marked its 10th anniversary with events across 10 countries in Asia, Europe, and Latin America. Activities included community gatherings, cosplay events, live performances, and interactive installations.

== Merchandise ==
=== Video games ===
| Year | Title | Genre(s) | Launch date | Availability | Platform(s) |
|---|---|---|---|---|---|
| 2015 | Magic Rush: Heroes | Role-playing game | April 2015 | Worldwide (excluding China) | Android, iOS |
| 2016 | Mobile Legends: Bang Bang | Multiplayer online battle arena | November 2016 | 220+ countries and regions | Android, iOS |
| 2019 | Mobile Legends: Adventure | Role-playing game | August 2019 | Worldwide | Android, iOS |
| 2023 | Watcher of Realms | Role-playing game | July 2023 | Global | Android, iOS |
| 2025 | Magic Chess: Go Go | Multiplayer auto battler | February 2025 | Asia-Pacific Region | Android, iOS |
| 2025 | Silver and Blood | Role-playing game | June 2025 | Global | Android, iOS |
| 2025 | Acecraft | Co-op vertical shooter | August 2025 | Global | Android, iOS |

=== Television series ===
| Title | Years | Network |
|---|---|---|
| Legends of Dawn: The Sacred Stone | 2021 | WeTV and Iflix (international); TV9 (Malaysia); NET (Indonesia); Kapamilya Channel & A2Z (Philippines) |

=== Awards ===
| Year | Organisation / event | Region | Recipient | Award | Ref. |
|---|---|---|---|---|---|
| 2022 | The Malaysia Book of Records | Malaysia | MPL Malaysia | Longest Running National Esports Tournament | |
| 2022 | Ministry of Commerce, People's Republic of China | China | MOONTON Games | National Key Cultural Export Enterprise for MOONTON Games | |
| 2023 | Ministry of Commerce, People's Republic of China | China | MOONTON Games | National Key Cultural Export Projects | |
| 2023 | Ministry of Commerce, People's Republic of China | China | Mobile Legends: Bang Bang | National Key Cultural Export Projects | |
| 2023 | The Esports Awards | Global | Mobile Legends: Bang Bang | Mobile Game of the Year | |
| 2024 | MOBIES (Mobile Awards) | United States | Mobile Legends: Bang Bang | Most Competitive Game of the Year | |
| 2024 | MOBIES (Mobile Awards) | United States | M5 World Championship | Live Event of the Year | |
| 2024 | MOBIES (Mobile Awards) | United States | Falcons AP.Bren | Mobile Team of the Year | |
| 2024 | GamingonPhone Awards | Global | Mobile Legends: Bang Bang | Mobile Esports Game of the Year | |
| 2024 | GamingonPhone Awards | Global | MOONTON Games | Best PR / Marketing Team | |
| 2024 | GamingonPhone Awards | Global | Selangor Red Giants | Mobile Esports Team of the Year | |
| 2024 | The Esports Awards | Global | Mobile Legends: Bang Bang | Esports Mobile Game of the Year | |
| 2025 | Ministry of Commerce, People's Republic of China | China | MOONTON Games | National Key Cultural Export Enterprise | |
| 2025 | Ministry of Commerce, People's Republic of China | China | Mobile Legends: Bang Bang | National Key Cultural Export Projects | |
| 2025 | GamingonPhone Awards | Global | MOONTON Games | Mobile Game Developer of the Year | |
| 2025 | GamingonPhone Awards | Global | Karl “KarlTzy” Nepomuceno | Mobile Esports Player of the Year | |
| 2025 | The Marketing Events Awards | Global | M6 World Championship | Gold – Best Hybrid Event | |
| 2025 | The Drum Awards: Marketing APAC | APAC | M6 World Championship | Gold – Gaming Category; Silver – Partnership or Collaboration | |

== Esports milestones ==
=== MLBB World Championship (M Series) ===
| Event | Year | Location | Notes | Ref. |
|---|---|---|---|---|
| M1 World Championship | 2019 | Kuala Lumpur, Malaysia | Featured 16 teams; reported cumulative viewership exceeded 40 million, with nearly 10 million total viewing hours. | |
| M2 World Championship | 2021 | Singapore | Recorded a peak concurrent audience of approximately 3.08 million and more than 130 million cumulative viewers; received Best Esport Event of the Year at Gamescom Asia 2021. | |
| M3 World Championship | 2021 | Singapore | Total viewing time exceeded 60 million hours; peak concurrent viewership reached approximately 3.19 million. | |
| M4 World Championship | 2023 | Jakarta, Indonesia | Generated approximately 79.68 million viewing hours; peak concurrent viewership reached approximately 4.26 million. | |
| M5 World Championship | 2023 | Manila, Philippines | Achieved a peak concurrent audience of approximately 5.07 million; reported as the most-watched MLBB World Championship to date. | |
| M6 World Championship | 2024 | Kuala Lumpur, Malaysia | Recorded a peak concurrent audience of approximately 4.13 million; received Best Hybrid Event at the Marketing Events Awards. | |
| M7 World Championship | 2026 | Jakarta, Indonesia | Breaks the viewership records to become the most-watched mobile esports event of all time, according to Esports Charts. | |

=== Regional leagues and other tournaments ===
| Event | Year | Location | Notes | Ref. |
|---|---|---|---|---|
| Mobile Legends: Bang Bang Professional League Indonesia Season 8 | 2021 | Bali, Indonesia | Reached a peak concurrent audience of approximately 2.4 million, setting a viewership record for the league at the time. | |
| MLBB LIGA LATAM | 2021 | Online (South America) | Marked the first major Mobile Legends tournament organized for the Latin American region. | |
| MLBB Women's Invitational | 2022 | Jakarta, Indonesia | Reported among the most-watched women’s esports tournaments at the time. | |
| MLBB Women's Tournament at the 32nd Southeast Asian Games | 2023 | Phnom Penh, Cambodia | Recorded a peak concurrent audience of approximately 1.37 million; noted for record viewership among women’s esports events. | |
