= Dream of Mirror Online =

2005 video game

Dream of Mirror Online (DOMO)
- Developer: Softstar
- Publishers: TW: Joypark; CHN: Joypark; JP: Gamania; NA: Aeria Games; EU: Aeria Games; THA: Goldensoft; NA: Suba Games; EU: Suba Games
- Series: Xuan-Yuan Sword
- Platform: Microsoft Windows
- Release: TW: September 9, 2005; NA: November 12, 2007; THA: October 7, 2007; NA: February 13, 2015; EU: February 13, 2015
- Genre: MMORPG
- Mode: Multiplayer

Dream of Mirror Online (DOMO) is a free-to-play MMORPG game with story lines based on ancient Chinese mythology. It is the second online game of the Xuan-Yuan Sword series. The graphics are anime-style with various Chinese themes. This game places great emphasis on teamwork and building relationships between players. The game was taken out of service in late 2012. In October 2014, SubaGames announced it was working on returning the service with crowdfunding from Kickstarter. In November 2014, DOMO was approved for re-release through Steam Greenlight. An official release date for the Closed Beta was given by Suba Games on February 2, 2015, for the date of February 13, 2015 at 5:00 PM EST.

== Plot ==
The central story involves an artifact called the Kunlun Mirror, an ancient artifact of time capable of copying everything from the real world to keep a record of things that exist. An unknown event caused the mirror to have a flawed reflection. As a result, "delusions" from peoples minds become monsters and ordinary creatures also transform when reflected in the mirror world. There are of the twelve Mirror Kings in DOMO, rulers of the Mirror World, and some have disappeared causing the remaining kings to summon human beings from the real world (the players) to the Mirror World to help defeat these delusions.

== Gameplay ==
Aeria has billed DOMO as a "social MMORPG". The gameplay encourages players to build relationships and form teams. Players can form special friendships, student-teacher, or even love relationships within the game that grant extra benefits such as abilities, fame, titles, or items; the Asian versions even currently offer in-game character marriages that grant special abilities to the lucky couple. Some characters also have special fated ties to other players that are based on the birthday selected for the character at creation. These relationships are marked by an arched red line, or "love line" that will form between the two. The love line represents not only potential romantic matches, but also possible family relationships and rivalries. Players do not have to acknowledge these love lines in any way; most players completely ignore them. However, there is no way to turn off love lines at this time. Same-sex marriage is now supported, meaning a female player can marry another female player, and likewise for the male players.

=== Races ===
There are 4 DOMO races: Humans, who are described as friendly and of ordinary capability; Shura, a beast-like race that can resemble both a fox (females) and dragon (males), are described as aggressive and with great physical prowess; Sylph, spirit-like creatures with great knowledge and wisdom but out of touch with their emotions; and Sprites, who are small and childlike in appearance.

The official DOMO website describes each race to be uniquely proficient in skill, but this does not significantly, if at all, affect the game of the player. A Sprite, despite their small size, can be just as competent as a Mercenary Shura of the same skill level. In the original release of the game these special race-skills made a big difference (such as Shura being better at physical attributes and Sylph at mental attributes), but this was phased out before the North American version of the game was released, making the differences today mostly cosmetic. It also affects certain dialog with NPCs and determines the village new characters start in.

=== Professions ===
The job system is similar to that of Final Fantasy XI. Every character starts with the occupation Commoner, which grants no special skills. After reaching level 10 as a commoner, by completing specified tasks, the player can qualify for new tasks. Levels, attributes, and skill points are recorded separately for each job. Players may go to an NPC in any town to select a job which their level qualifies them to take. Levels, attributes, and skill points are recorded separately for each job type.

There are currently 13 professions in the North American version. They are Blademaster, Dancer, Doctor, Fencer, Hunter, Martial Artist, Mercenary, Merchant, Musician, Shaman, Thief, Wizard, and Witch Doctor, the new profession as of early June, 2009.

=== Pets ===
Pet tokens (which can be used in-game to get a random pet egg (level 0), including the Special Edition pets) and pet chests are available for purchase in the game's cash shop. However, existing pets can also be traded in game, making it easier for those who would rather use in-game funds to purchase one. Also a quest in game can award the participants a hibernating Metal egg.

Pets have 4 stages of growth: egg, child, youth, and adult. To enable the pet to continue leveling an evolution stone is needed to evolve the pet to the next stage. At level 61 (adulthood) players can purchase pet saddles to ride the pet. Currently a pet saddle can only be bought through in-game cash shop or trading between players. Note that players can only ride Metal, Sapphire, Ruby and Rock pets.

There are currently six types of pets, each with an associated element and their own strengths and weaknesses: Metal - metal element, looks like a golden bear. Jade - wood element, looks like a cactus. Sapphire - water element, looks like a long-necked turtle. Ruby - fire element, looks like a flying cat. Rock - earth element, looks like a wild boar. Love - no element, looks like a girl.

There is also a special Bird pet, which can be obtained like any other pet (at a lower chance), it also follows the same evolution pattern as the other pets, but at its first stage of evolution, it either obtains a wood, water or fire element attribute at random, and as it levels up it develops skills based on that element. A Dragon pet type has also been released since.

Each pet comes in a regular form and also five "special edition" versions that offer an alternate appearance.

=== Traveling ===
Once a character reaches level 15 in any job, they become eligible to complete a quest that grants them the ability to fly on almost any weapon (that the player can equip). The flying system is based on the sword-flying myths in Chinese legends. In addition, there have been special items only available through purchase at the cash shop that are made for flight e.g. the special flying broom released in Halloween. Each different piece of flying equipment has its own features and specific speed; however, some weapons simply cannot fly, and others will only fly after achieving a specific level. Along with moving faster than running on the ground, flying allows characters to cross geographic barriers such as mountains or oceans and perform sky stunts. Flying level is further improved by completing specific quests that improve a character's flight speed and maximum altitude. The current max flying level in the North American version is 22.

Another way to travel in Dream of Mirror Online is by riding a pet. When the Bird / Sapphire / Metal / Ruby / Rock pets reach level 61 and evolved into its adulthood stage, players can purchase a saddle from the cash shop and use it to ride their pets.
