= Super Auto Pets =

2021 auto battler game

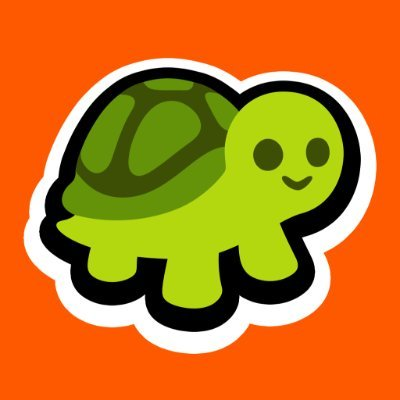
- Icon, used since 2023
- Developer: Team Wood Games
- Publisher: Team Wood Games
- Engine: Unity
- Platforms: Linux; Microsoft Windows; MacOS; iOS; Android
- Genre: Auto battler
- Mode: Multiplayer

Super Auto Pets is an auto battler video game developed and published by Team Wood Games. It was released on Steam for Microsoft Windows on September 24, 2021, in February 2022 on iOS and Android, and for macOS in October 2022. It is also available to play on a web browser.

The player chooses "pets" with special abilities to fight against other users. The game gained significant popularity after Twitch streamers Northernlion and Ludwig played the game, introducing it to their respective audiences.

== Gameplay ==
=== Arena Mode ===
The game consists of multiple turns which have two phases, the preparation phase and the battle phase.

During the preparation phase, players manage their team before going into the battle phase by buying new pets, feeding them food, increasing their level, and switching the positions of the pets from left to right. Players have 10 gold at the start of each preparation phase, which are used to buy pets, food, and to refresh their shop. Players can gain gold by selling pets or by using the abilities of pets with gold-generating abilities. The players can spend as much time as they want in this phase.

The battle phase begins after the player has finished the preparation phase. In this phase, the pets battle each other automatically without player control. The pet in the right-most slot of player's team fights the pet on the left-most slot on the opponent team. When a pet faints, the pet in the right-most slot of the team takes the place of the fainted pet. This repeats until one or both of the teams has no pets left, at which point the turn results in a win, loss, or draw. If the player wins, they receive a trophy. If they lose, they lose a life point (the number of trophies remains the same). If they draw, their life points and trophies remain unchanged. On turn 3, if a player has lost a life point in the previous 2 turns, they regain one life point. The player wins the game when they obtain 10 trophies.

Every two turns, players advance a tier, giving them access to pets and food a tier above, which are generally better than the previous. Players begin at tier 1 and advance until tier 6, where they will no longer advance in tiers.

Players battle against either, other players' teams, or AI-generated teams, if there are no players at that turn. All battles are performed asynchronously.

=== Versus Mode ===
In addition to the regular "Arena" mode above, there is also a "Versus" mode. In this mode players compete against each other in asynchronous or real time 1v1s or 8-person lobbies. Every player starts out with a score of 1500 and will either lose or gain points upon loss or win. There are three separate queues, for the weekly pack, custom packs and static packs. The weekly pack leaderboard is reset every week, while the others are not. When in queue with a static pack (either the Turtle, Puppy, Star, Golden, or Danger pack) the player may decide to play against any other static pack or instead only play against players using the same pack they are.

There is also a "With Friends" mode available, which was formerly considered Versus Mode in previous game versions. In this mode, players may create or join rooms and face each other exclusively. The creator of the room can set which pack the room will use and certain rules, such as how much time each player has to complete their preparation phase or how many life points are deducted with each loss. These private rooms formerly could hold up to 64 people, though this has since been reduced to 16.

=== Packs ===
Within the game there are various packs available to choose from, which act as a roster of available pets to choose from during gameplay. Players may choose to battle other players exclusively using the same pack as them or against all other players. There are 7 packs available to play at any time.

- The original pack of the game is known as the Turtle Pack, which includes the original pets of the game, including the Turtle and Turkey. This pack includes 60 pets and 16 food items.
- The second pack is the Puppy Pack, originally created as a mix of pets from the Turtle Pack and a handful of new ones. In June 2023, a rework was released, which focuses on the new Toy mechanic. The reworked pack adds 50 new pets and 9 new food items.
- The third pack is the Star Pack, which adds a new roster of pets and focuses on the strawberry fruit and the accompanying mechanics with it. This pack also introduces the push mechanic, which allows players to move the order of pets on their own team or the enemy team. This pack adds 83 new pets and 24 new food items.
- The fourth pack is the Golden Pack, which focuses on the Trumpet mechanic, where pets can add trumpets, use trumpets, or neither, allowing their team to summon a golden retriever. This pack adds 74 new pets and 14 new food items.
- The fifth pack is the Unicorn Pack, which features mystical-themed pets as well as a mana mechanic and additional ailment effects. It is the largest pack to date, featuring 96 new pets and 20 new food items.
- The sixth pack is the Danger Pack, which focuses on endangered animals. It adds a new mechanic called "Jump Attacks" and focuses on the Transform mechanic. It adds 61 new pets and 18 new food items.
- The final pack is the Weekly Pack, which changes every week to include a new mix of pets and food for players to play with. This pack mostly uses pets from the static packs; however, there are a few pets that are not part of previous packs that can exclusively be found in the Weekly Pack or Custom Pack.

Additionally, players can create their own packs, known as Custom Packs. Custom Packs can include any combination of pets and food from packs the player has bought. Each Custom Pack must follow guidelines, such as the number of pets and food that can be added in each tier.
