= Ace Online =

2006 video game

- Developer: Maiet Entertainment
- Publishers: YD Online Corp. (Korea); MasangSoft Inc. (Europe); Suba Games, LLC (North America); Axeso5 (Latin America); Winner Online (Thailand); VTC Online (Vietnam); Yetime (China); Gamon (Taiwan); Arario Corp. (Japan); Innova Inc. (Russia); OhLaLa Interactive (South East Asia)
- Platform: Microsoft Windows
- Release: May 26, 2006 (International); September 26, 2008 (North American Relaunch)
- Genre: MMO 3D Space Shooter
- Mode: Multiplayer

Ace Online or AirRivals is a free-to-play massively multiplayer online game (MMOG) 3D shooter developed by MasangSoft Inc. and owned by YD Online Corp.

== History ==
In North America, the game was previously released as Space Cowboy Online through a portal known as gPotato, which was operated by Gala-Net. Space Cowboy Online's client was made available for download on May 22, 2006, and the service went live on May 26, 2006.

On December 26, 2007, Space Cowboy Online was shut down. This was announced to the public with a letter from Space Cowboy's last active GM, "Xarfox".

Following the closure of Space Cowboy Online, the European version of the game would be hosted under GameForge4D GmbH and renamed to AirRivals in early 2008 (originally, it was intended to be known as Flysis). The North American release would soon follow, with hosting from Suba Games beginning on September 26, 2008, titled Ace Online.

Other publishers eventually followed, with Arario Corporation acquiring the license to host Ace Online in Japan and launching in the first quarter of 2009, while Axeso5 officially opened the first Latin American Ace Online server in February 2011.

In 2016, GameForge4D GmbH relinquished the rights for hosting AirRivals, which were then handed to MasangSoft. Players were offered the chance to transfer their gears and in-game items to a new server, where the European version would once again be renamed, this time to Ace Online.

== Gameplay ==
Collected kill points dependency on player level

In Ace Online, players pilot their own individual starfighters (called "Gears") throughout a number of maps, including terrestrial, lunar, and space maps. It has typical MMORPG elements such as leveling, currency, a skill system and combat mostly based on player equipment and level. Ace Online is a largely player vs. player-oriented game (PvP), with character leveling and item acquisition achieved through combat against non-player characters and the completion of missions. After the conclusion of certain missions, more maps will be accessible to the player. Although a high level character will have better character attributes than most other players, no one at any level is invincible against other players in PvP. As in other MMORPGs, players can trade items, customize their gears, form parties ("formations") and guilds ("brigades"), and fight with other players via PvP combat. Almost all of the combat in Ace Online is aerial, from the third-person view. Players have the option to use an in-cockpit, first-person view.

When players create their account, they can choose their fighter, each with different play styles.

=== Item shop and enchantments ===
Ace Online is a free-to-play MMO, with the option of buying in-game items via an "Item Shop" that can be accessed when the player interacts with the item shop icon in the bottom right corner of the screen, or by speaking to an NPC in the main hub. A player can only purchase the items from the item shop using currency that must be purchased through a website via a Ace Online account. There are many items available to purchase that affect a gear's weapons (e.g. change the trail effect of the missiles), stats (e.g. full reset or partial reset of stats), experience (e.g. increase experience rate) or others for a limited time. This item shop was made available to players on June 23, 2006.

The item shop also includes "Weapon Gamble", "Enhancements", "Enchant Protection" and "Legending" services. Weapon Gamble allows weapons to be "gambled" and enchanted. This card randomly gambles the weapon stats with prefix and suffix to add extra attributes to the weapon. "Enhancements" affect a player's weapons and armor to boost performance, such as having faster missiles, higher rate of fire, or damage. To limit the power of weapons and armor, only five enchantments can be applied safely to a piece of equipment. For the sixth enchant and onward, there is a chance to break the weapon.

=== Nation War ===
Ace Online offers a PvP system of "Nation Wars", which revolves around a point system: "National Contribution Points" (NCP). The two nations in question are Bygeniou City United (BCU) and Arlington National Influence (ANI). Every time an enemy gear is shot down, the shooter's nation gains 1 NCP. NCP are also gained for other events, such as Strategic Points, Mothership wars, and Arena battles. Arena battles usually give a small amount of NCP compared to Strategic Points and Mothership wars.

- Raids - The two nations (BCU and ANI) are separated by a series of maps. Nation Wars involve a constant battle between these two nations to raid and defend these maps, which provide strategic and economic advantages. For example, the boss monster "Pathos" only spawns in the BCU map "Zaylope Beach". Whoever controls "Zaylope Beach" will have the chance to destroy it and receive its rare drops if "Pathos" should spawn. Battling over these maps often results in tens of thousands of NCPs gained for either nation, speeding up the spawning of motherships (see below for motherships). Some of these maps are restricted to low level players, which they cannot access until a certain level or by fulfilling a certain condition (e.g. finish a particular mission).
- Skirmishes - Random, unorganized battles, often on neutral maps. They are a major source of fame and NCP. The one and only objective in these wars is to kill as many players of the opposing nation as possible. These wars are often started by a single gear traversing through enemy territory. The nation leader of the defending territory will then inform players of this intruder, where they may respond and intercept. The intruder can call upon reinforcements or assistance. This encourages players to participate, where a skirmish sometimes transpires into a full war. These wars are heavily appreciated among the population.

One of the most popular areas for these unorganized battles is "Bark City", as it is a neutral zone between the two warring nations. It contains wide open spaces, a repair shop, and access to four teleports, two of which only open during a time-specific event that either nation can participate in.

- Mothership Wars - A major component of the game's core design. A nation leader (one elected for every month for BCU and ANI) can choose when a "mothership" - a stationary target which players must attack or defend - spawns. Each nation can only choose when the opposing mothership spawns, which they must defeat. If the mothership is not completely destroyed in two hours, it will despawn. Successful destruction of the enemy mothership grants the attacking nation a 5% increase in recovery rate of energy, shield, and skill points, also allowing access to the "Hornian King Habitat" and "Eopi", maps with exclusive mobs, bosses, and rare items. Successfully defending a mothership does not grant the defender any bonuses; instead, it prevents the enemy from receiving the reward. The BCU mothership, Anubis, spawns in Tylent Jungle, while the ANI mothership, Horus, spawns in Reynard Beach. Bonuses obtained from destroying/defending motherships are reset at the end of every month, as are NCP. The fourth mothership of each side that spawns also gives a special reward. In older versions of the game, motherships would spawn when a nation reached 100,000 NCP. This was likely changed due to scheduling conflicts among the population, which saw players waking themselves up at odd hours to participate, in fear of losing out on War Points which were required for highly desirable end-game items in the War Point Shop.
- Strategic Points - Strategic Points are spawned in a random map at random times, and it will despawn one hour after its spawn if not destroyed completely. An announcement is made to all players of both nations which map the Strategic Point has spawned in. When a Strategic Point is destroyed, all attackers gain 300 War Points and a "SPI Capsule", which provides them with SPI (the game's currency). When a Strategic Point is successfully defended, the defending nation gains bonuses. If a Strategic Point is lost while defending players are in the same map or adjacent maps, they will gain 100 War Points. All players in the same map or adjacent maps as the Strategic Point will gain "Personal Contribution" which is a monetary reward based on the player's performance in combat.
- War Points- Players can gain War Points from attacking/defending motherships, and Strategic Points. War Points can also be obtained in battles with the opposing nation. War Points allow players to buy unique items from the War Point Shop. These points can be used to buy stronger adhesives, armors, and other bonuses.
- Nation Leader- Every month, players who are level 70 or higher, have 2000 fame, and lead a brigade (usually called "guild or "clan" in other MMOs) with at least 30 people that possess 1000 or more fame can run for the nation leader position. Multiple players can apply, and either nation's population can vote on who they want to have as their nation leader. Players who become nation leaders hold that title for a month until the next election. The nation leader of each side (ANI and BCU) obtains a leader mark and the leader adhesive. This provides them a defensive bonus, and the standard color for their name changes to a bright green, where they are easily identified. They are given special permissions, such as "Leader Chat" (a special type of chat function that allows their messages to be displayed to their entire nation, rather than a selective channel). They are also provided SPI (which the game brands as "war funds") upon completion of Strategic Points and Mothership Wars. The leader may also appoint two sub-leaders who can help them lead the nation. Leaders may set the time an opposing mothership spawns, up until a week before, at which point it cannot be changed.
- Grinding Maps- Players from BCU and ANI will coexist in certain maps to "grind", where they can spend time leveling their gears. This mostly only occurs in grinding maps which contain an assortment of mobs that may require little effort to defeat and/or reward a fair amount of EXP. However, this coexistence between BCU and ANI is not a rule within the game itself; instead it is a player induced response to the game's naturally slow progression in later levels.

=== Duels ===
Ace Online contains a duel based system where players may challenge other players in either a 1 on 1 duel or "Formation Battle" (up to 6 players per formation).

- 1 on 1 - A 1 on 1 duel can be initiated by one player challenging the other, in which the challenged must accept. If the duel is accepted, both participants receive a 5-second warning, after which there is an unlimited amount of time for either opponent to shoot each other down once. Should one of the players die under any circumstance (being shot down by the opposing player in the duel, crashing into terrain objects, being killed by a member of the opposing nation, or being killed by a hostile NPC) then the surviving player is declared the winner. Being disconnected results in a loss for the disconnected player, and moving to a different map will result in a loss, even if a player uses "Express City Return Portal" to teleport back to the city.
- Formation Battle - A formation battle can be initiated with the command /formfight, which must be done by the formation leader. A formation battle may contain up to six players in a group (known as "Forms"), and can only occur if all members of both formations are in the same map, logged on, and if the challenged formation leader accepts the form fight request. Once a formation battle request is sent, no new players may be invited to the formation; existing formation members cannot be kicked; and the formation may not disband. A formation battle is won when all members of the opposing formation have been eliminated under any circumstance. If one member of a formation dies while the rest are still alive, they cannot respawn until the formation battle is won or lost.

== Development and release ==
Ace Online was developed by Masangsoft.

Masangsoft announced Ace Online at 2007 G-Star. An Episode 3 update was released on 17 July 2008.
