= Storybook Brawl =

2021 auto battler video game

- Developer: Good Luck Games
- Engine: Unity
- Platform: Windows
- Release: 18 June 2021 (Early access)
- Genre: Auto battler
- Modes: Single-player, multiplayer

Storybook Brawl was an auto battler video game developed by American studio Good Luck Games. Development began in 2020, and the game was released in early access for Windows in June 2021. The game and studio were acquired by cryptocurrency exchange FTX in March 2022 to develop non-fungible token integrations, a move that faced player backlash. Servers were shut down in May 2023 in the wake of the bankruptcy of FTX.

== Gameplay ==
Storybook Brawl was a fantasy-themed card-based auto battler featuring gameplay inspired by Hearthstone Battlegrounds. In each game, players first selected a hero which granted them a passive ability. The game was then divided into alternating shopping phases and combat phases. In shopping phases, players spent a limited amount of resources per round on cards representing characters to play on their boards, as well as upgrades for these characters and non-character treasures and spells. These were followed by combat phases, automated fights against other players' boards. Players' boards contained up to seven characters, and one of the primary difference between Storybook Brawl and previous card-based auto battlers was that cards were played on two lines instead of just one.

== Development ==
The studio Good Luck Games was founded in Olympia, Washington by former Magic: The Gathering professional players Matthew Place, Josh Utter-Leyton, Matt Nass and Brandon Nelson. Some other members were Rubén Luna de San Macario as VFX artist, Johnathon Conbere and César Romero Albertos as programmers and Antonio Vargas as QA. They later hired Luis Scott-Vargas as vice president of marketing, totaling a staff of seven working on the game as of August 2021. Development began in 2020, and Storybook Brawl released in early access on 18 June 2021.

Good Luck Games was acquired by cryptocurrency exchange FTX on 22 March 2022. FTX, whose founder Sam Bankman-Fried named Storybook Brawl his favorite game, sought to use the game to test and improve the reception to cryptocurrency integrations in games, and planned to integrate the development team as part of its FTX Gaming division. Plans for the game included non-fungible token-based in-game collectible items, as well as traditional, art-based NFTs.

Due to the bankruptcy of FTX, the game's servers were shut down on 1 May 2023, and a planned tournament in the Bahamas was cancelled.

== Reception ==
Storybook Brawl received mixed reviews. It was favorably compared to Hearthstone Battlegrounds by Screen Rant, stating that its two rows, greater depth, and wider variety of mechanics led to more replayability. However, PC Gamer criticized these elements, describing the game as "crowded" and that the "sheer number of random elements causes games to vary wildly from one to the next".

After being acquired by FTX, the game was review bombed on Steam due to backlash against the plans to add blockchain features and non-fungible tokens to the game. The game's rating, which had previously been "mostly positive", dropped to "overwhelmingly negative".
