= Priston Tale =

2001 video game

PristonTale is a 3D fantasy massively multiplayer online role-playing game (MMORPG) developed by Triglow Pictures Inc. that was first released by Yedang Online in Korea in 2001. The game is based on an action game with a clan system, ten character classes, and a five-tier skill system. The game has been released in several regions including Japan, China, Thailand and Brazil and supports both pay-to-play and free-to-play modes.

After a lengthy beta testing phase, the English version was officially launched in 2004 and transitioned to a free-to-play model in 2007. Although the original English server was shut down in 2008, Suba Games opened a new server shortly after, and PristonTale is still accessible through both official and private servers.

== Gameplay ==
Gameplay mostly consists of leveling up, though there are several activities players can participate in that are essential to the game. Some of these activities are:

- Trading: Buying and selling items. Players usually find this necessary in order to gain money and equipment otherwise unobtainable from NPC merchants.
- Clans: Players can join clans, in which teamwork prevails. They are the core of the social community of the game. Clans can also participate in special events created for clans only. Clans can be made once a player reaches level 40 or higher.
- Bellatra: formerly known as Survive or Die (SoD), a competition in which four teams with members of the same clan are forced to fight monsters until two teams are declared finalists. These two teams will continue fighting monsters until the last one survives. The winning team is chosen by whichever one has the higher number of points. Teams receive points by killing monsters and monster bosses. The Boss monsters give higher numbers of points. The winning team's Clan Chief acquires rights over the Bellatra by gaining the ability to modify the monsters when the Chief fights next, by receiving an income from Bellatra, etc. Bellatra is located in the town Navisko and available for players level 80 and above.
- Bless Castle: Bless Castle is a Player vs. Player activity in which one clan holds and defends the castle from all other participating clans, which can use siege equipment.
- Ghost Castle: Three characters of different classes play together, can be done once a day. Entrance to Ghost Castle is in Garden of Freedom.
- Ardor: Also known as Ricarten SoD, located in the town Ricarten by the exit to Garden of Freedom, this is SoD for players level 40 to level 79.
- Trecor Yalta was known to be the main boss next to Fury 1, 2 & 3

The other aspects of game play are "training", "climbing", hunting, player vs. player fights and socializing.

- Training: A player levels by killing large numbers of monsters at one given time, or many individual monsters quickly. Players may be in "party's" of 2–6 and level together.
- Climbing: One will attempts to move their character in a way that causes s/he to be on top of structures inside the game.
- Hunting: One faces as few as one monster but usually no more than three, to look for certain items in the game.
- Player vs. Player: One goes to a specified area to compete against other players, sometimes only one and sometimes as many as twenty.
- Socializing: Self-explanatory, used in PristonTale to obtain items, throwing friends at enemies and anything else considered of value in the game.

Throughout the game, the characters progress through a series of levels and acquire skill points. As they progress they get different items, such as weapons and armour, to help them in their quest of achieving the ultimate warrior. Items of this calibre usually require a larger number of skill points in an area than the previous items. Armour in general helps the character stay alive longer by giving them different attributes. Weapons in general help the character defend themselves or attack any monster they wish with a lot more force.

At the same time, there are certain specifications as to when players may use such weapons and armour. These are mostly based on level and stat requirements. Also, there are certain specs for armour and weapons so that they may achieve their great performance and special stats. These may be found in game, written on the armour or weapon (e.g. Fighter Spec, Knight Spec, etc.). Different Classes use different weapons; for example, the knight mainly uses two-handed swords and blades, whereas the Archer uses bows. The different items players may obtain with specs determine which types of character classes use them. Most swords will come as Knight or Mechanician spec when most wands/staves will come as Magician Spec or Priestess Spec.

At higher level's obtaining items can become quite difficult due to low supply and high demand for the "high level" items. Magic characters such a Priestess and Magician will find the market for their items is less competitive. Whereas the melee characters such as Fighter, Pikeman, and Knight have a higher rate of competition for items.

== Reception ==
PristonTale received an award for "Outstanding Online Game" in December 2002 and "Outstanding Programming" at the 2003 Korean Gaming Grand Ceremony.

== Critic Review ==
John 'Valandil' Keeler from IGN stated, "In the beginning, it is said that there were 10 Gods of Creation. Together, they created the World populated it with human minions to work as their foot soldiers. But due to the traitorous actions of the Demon God Igolanos who betrayed the others, a vicious Genesis War erupted among them and their followers. Battered and scarred from this conflict, the remnants who managed to survive persevered, eventually emerging after many ages as an evolved race known as the Tempskron. With their true past forgotten, they settled in the southern regions of the ravaged continent Priston, where they now live a peaceful existence. The stage is thus set for Priston Tale, an online world project now in development at Triglow Pictures, a studio located in the southern regions of Korea, specifically in its capita city of Seoul.

The saga will continue from this point forward with players adventuring through a fantasy-based 3D environment filled with monsters to hunt, locations to explore and treasures to find, all seen by way of a free-floating camera that affords a full 360 degrees of movement. Among other interesting features, the title offers four starting character classes, each of which can upgrade into three higher ones for a total of 16 possibilities, and with provision for changing among them to break the monotony of the repetitive level advancement by learning different skills and spells. Many of these are combat-oriented; this aspect of the game boasts explosive action and effects to provide "arcade-level" fun."

== Priston Tale II ==
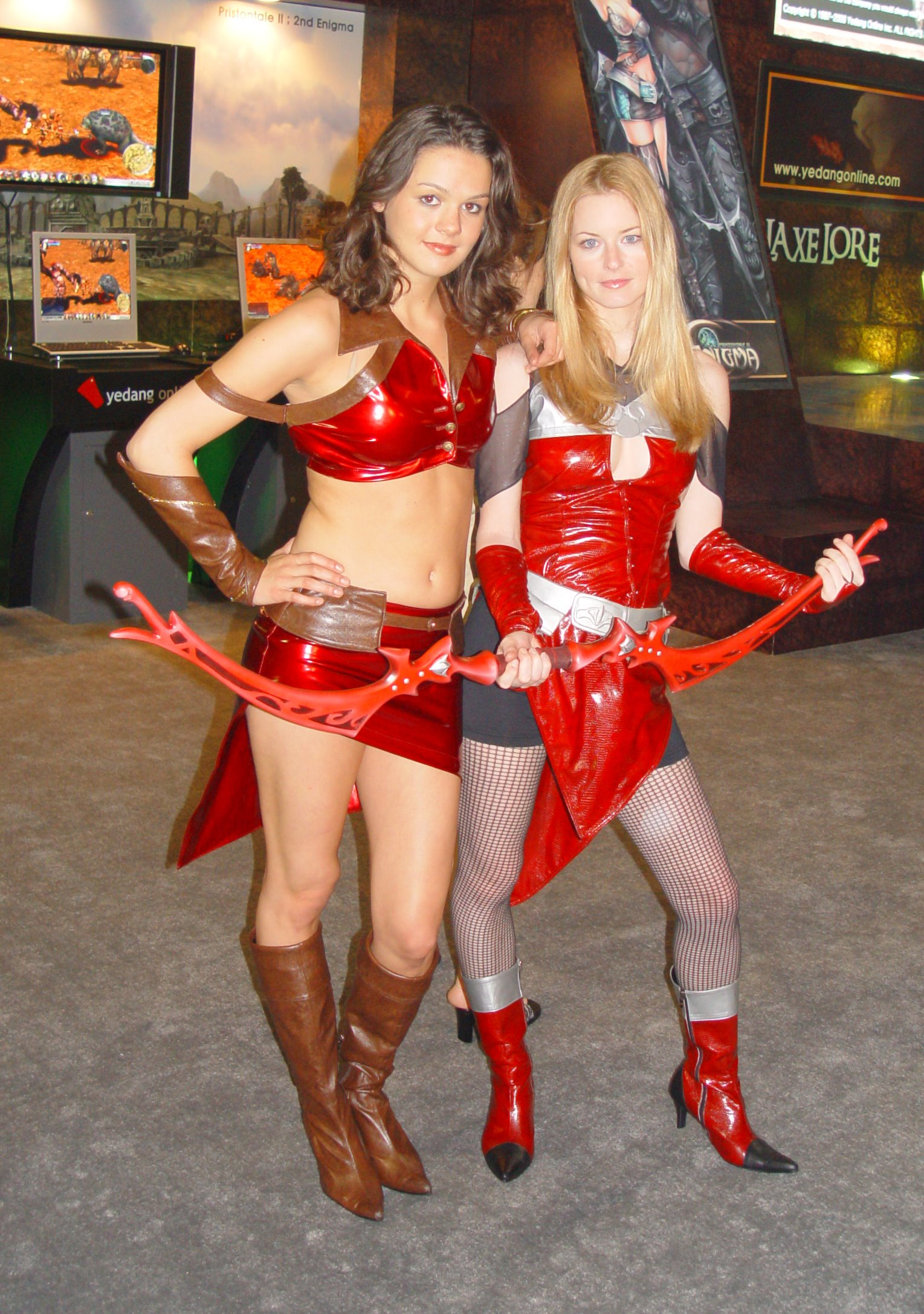
Promotion at E3 2006

The sequel to Priston Tale was released in February 2008. The developers sought to take the basic concepts of the first game and improve upon them. The development team stated at one point that they were "inexperienced" and had "learnt a lot" from the first version and that the second has had much better planning. Screenshots of the new game from E3 2006 depicted many recognizable characters, enemies, and environments, albeit altered significantly. It uses Unreal Engine 2.

As of 2008, Priston Tale 2 has only been released outside of beta in South Korea. Player response in South Korea has been very good, with over 30,000 players online, playing simultaneously on the first day of open beta, and 40,000 players online simultaneously as of the third day. The game still maintains popularity and is competing with SP1 and Twelve Skies for market share, with tens of thousands of players online simultaneously at any given time.

Yedang Online has contracted with various publishers, and localized versions (including North America) will begin beta service in early to mid-2009. The European closed beta of Priston Tale II was released in October 2008. The open beta was released 14 February 2009 although access to the European open beta is subject to regional restrictions via an IP block on the login server. As of March 2013 English server of Priston Tale II closed down.
