= Esports at the 2023 SEA Games – Mobile Legends men's team tournament =

Esports event at the SEA Games

Mobile Legends at the 2023 SEA Games
- Venue: Nagaworld 2
- Dates: 12–14 May 2023
- Nations: 9

Medalists
gold medal	Philippines (PHI)
silver medal	Malaysia (MAS)
bronze medal	Myanmar (MYA)
bronze medal	Cambodia (CAM)

The Mobile Legends: Bang Bang tournament for the 2023 SEA Games was held on May 12 to 14 at Nagaworld 2 in Phnom Penh, Cambodia. This was the third iteration of the MLBB Tournament in the SEA Games. It is the first time that there will be a joint bronze medal winner.

The tournament consisted of a group stage and a single-elimination playoff round.

The Philippines won the gold medal for 3rd consecutive time after beating Malaysia 3–0 in the final. Myanmar and Cambodia shared the bronze medal.

== Participating teams ==
There are nine nations participated at the Mobile Legends: Bang Bang tournament.

- Cambodia (CAM)
- Indonesia (INA)
- Laos (LAO)
- Malaysia (MAS)
- Myanmar (MYA)
- Philippines (PHI)
- Singapore (SGP)
- Timor Leste (TLS)
- Vietnam (VIE)

=== Squads ===
Source: 2023 SEA Games Mobile Legends: Bang Bang squad list

Cambodia	Indonesia	Laos	Malaysia	Myanmar
Cheang Piseth; Khoun Amey; Kosal Piseth; Nhem Chandavan; Pich Sopheak; Sok Roth; Ty Oudom	Rizqi Iskandar; Albert Iskandar; Gilang; Calvin; Jabran Wiloko; Rachmad Wahyudi; Nicky Fernando	Bounsong Khounphet; Phonepaseuth Lotchanakane; Phonesana Inthavongxay; Aphisith Inmixay; Somneuk Vilaysing; Nanthavouth Nieo In; Sampasith Phanthavong	Idreen Abdul Jamal; Zul Hisham Noor; Irwandy Lim; Arif Abdul Halim; Danial Fuad; Nazhan Nor; Syafizan Najmi	Kyaw Zin Bo; Min Ko Ko; Pay Hein Ko; Pyae Sone Khant; Swan Htet Aung; Ye Naung Oo; Zayawin Paing
Philippines	Singapore	Timor-Leste	Vietnam	
David Canon; Michael Sayson; Angelo Arcangel; Marco Requitiano; Rowgien Unigo; Nowee Macasa	Yeo Lun; Brayden Teo; Amos Rui; Jovan Heng; Bellamy Yeov; Royven Tan	Francelino Nobel Gusmao; Leonisio Leong Amaral; Francisco Xavier Lema; Avelardo Gusmao De Oliveira; Domingos Maria Lopes; Claudio Monteiro Do Carmo; Excel Mahabaratha Monteiro	Nguyễn Văn Tô Đô; Lâm Văn Đạt; Phạm Ngọc Trạng; Nguyễn Đức Nam; Fugo; Yandere; Bier	

== Results ==
=== Group stage ===
==== Group A ====
Pos	Team	Pld	W	L	GF	GA	GD	Pts	Qualification
1	Malaysia (Q)	4	4	0	4	0	+4	4	Advanced to the Semifinals
2	Philippines (Q)	4	3	1	3	1	+2	3	Advanced to the Semifinals
3	Vietnam (E)	4	2	2	2	2	0	2	
4	Laos (E)	4	1	3	1	3	−2	1	
5	Timor-Leste (E)	4	0	4	0	4	−4	0	

Source: One Esports
(E) Eliminated; (Q) Qualified for the phase indicated

==== Group B ====
Pos	Team	Pld	W	L	GF	GA	GD	Pts	Qualification
1	Myanmar (Q)	3	3	0	3	0	+3	3	Advanced to the Semifinals
2	Cambodia (H, Q)	3	2	1	2	1	+1	2	Advanced to the Semifinals
3	Indonesia (E)	3	1	2	1	2	−1	1	
4	Singapore (E)	3	0	3	0	3	−3	0	

Source: One Esports
(E) Eliminated; (H) Hosts; (Q) Qualified for the phase indicated

=== Final round ===
Semifinals
Malaysia	2
Cambodia	1
Myanmar	1
Philippines	2

Grand Finals
Malaysia	0
Philippines	3
Third place
Cambodia	0
Myanmar	2

=== Semifinals ===
Team 1	Series	Team 2	Game 1	Game 2	Game 3
Malaysia	2–1	Cambodia	CAM	MAS	MAS
Myanmar	1–2	Philippines	MYA	PHI	PHI

Source: One Esports

=== Bronze-medal match ===
Team 1	Series	Team 2	Game 1	Game 2	Game 3
Cambodia	0–2	Myanmar	MYA	MYA	

Source: One Esports

=== Grand Finals ===
Team 1	Series	Team 2	Game 1	Game 2	Game 3	Game 4	Game 5
Malaysia	0–3	Philippines	PHI	PHI	PHI		

Source: One Esports
