= Fragoria =

- Developer: Rusoftware
- Publisher: Datcroft Games
- Engine: Unity
- Platform: Flash
- Release: WW: 2013
- Genre: MMORPG
- Mode: Multiplayer

Fragoria (Russian: Фрагория) is a browser based, free to play massively multiplayer online role play game of a Russian indie developer Rusoftware and its Europe based successor Datcroft Games. Fragoria is set in a massive, fully realized world based on Slavic fairy tales and legends of the modern world. There are more than 800 quests that can be played and several dungeons that can be explored. There are also a handful of PvP games to become involved in, ranging from simple 1 on 1 duels to full-scale wars with objectives. The game features an advanced pet system, an auction house for players to sell their items, a mail system, an extensive crafting system and four professions to choose from. The game is played on the Adobe Flash engine, in an isometric 3D perspective. It has been praised for its ability to efficiently use the engine.

The game principle of the fantasy role-playing game is orientated to the games Diablo and World of Warcraft (WoW).

== Game ==
Fragoria takes place within a fantasy environment. The expansive game world is inhabited by many creatures. There are PvE and PvP battles in the game. This allows for multiple variations of combat to happen within the world. At the beginning of the game the player needs to create a character which is then born in Heaven. Each player can create up to four characters on each server, of which there are several.

Characters evolve mainly by completing quests starting from the first level, however they can kill monsters to loot the bodies. The crafting mechanic is an important part of the game; players are able to create useful items, that are sometimes not available except by buying them with a "premium" currency that has a real-life exchange rate known as Emeralds. Abilities of the characters can be improved by purchase of books (with in-game currency) or change of class. Starting from the thirteenth level players can go to varying dungeons of three types.

There are plenty of communication means among players in the game, including in-game posts and chat box, community is created and evolved within guilds and alliances. Game is imitating a real world society with inequality, wealth classes and interactions. Consequently, the game has a dynamic social and economic environment.

=== Quests ===
Civilians always have something helpful to say, they often need help and will end up helping you as well. It is advised that you always talk to them to make sure you are not missing out on anything important. After helping civilians you will get useful items, experience, money, essential information or reputation of various organisations.

There are several basic types of quests:

- Search for an NPC- Sometimes civilians will ask you to search for their missing friends or strangers.
- Find or trade an item - Sometimes civilians need to find something, gather materials, or send a letter.
- Kill monsters - Often, civilians encounter annoying beasts and horrific monsters and will need your help getting rid of them.

Most quests can be done only once, but there are repeatable quests that you may perform multiple times. Assignments vary in terms of difficulty, and your quest log will show the names of the quests and their icons in different colors accordingly.

- Very simple quests appear white, and their icons - gray.
- Simple quests are shown in green.
- Average quests are shown in yellow.
- Difficult quests are shown in orange.

=== PvP Battles ===
In Fragoria there are special PvP-locations on which battles between characters are resolved. Basically, it is locations for characters above 15 levels.

For convenience of battles between characters there are some PvP -modes:

- Peace mode - the character at all does not attack other characters.
- Free mode - the character will attack all other characters.
- Group mode - the character will attack all other characters except for those who consists in one group with it.
- Guild mode - the character will attack all other characters except for those who consists in one guild with it.
- Only malicious - the character will attack only Characters.

On some locations there is special PvP a zone - Arena. It is presented by the round closed arena on which there is not enough place for movings. On arena two characters having a difference on levels. Having exposed the character on duel and having waited the opponent, you need to make preliminary rates on an outcome of duel. To generate prize-winning fund which is received by the winner. On arena the opportunity to make the rate on "death" of fights also is given to spectators of fights.

"Many guilds from different servers fights with each other on special lands and on special boss events. At the same time there are many PVP games like "Capture the flag", "King of the hill", "Last man standing" where players can enjoy the game and get the reward with a short time."

=== Pets ===
Characters can have pets. Pet is a character's companion, able to help in a difficult situation, to protect in fight, to strengthen the character or to weaken the opponent. Companions serve as true assistants in fight, both against monsters and against other characters.

=== Game currency ===
The game has three kinds of currencies: gold, emeralds and signs. Gold is a game currency, emeralds is a premium currency and signs can be gained in PvP battles. Gold is the most generic currency in the game, and comes in 3 denominations.

=== Classes ===
On the first levels all characters have one class, which combines features of both, a warrior and magician. On levels 8, 15, and 31 players can choose a new class. In total there are 18 classes in the game that determine character's skills and evolution.

== Distribution ==
Fragoria was published primarily in Russia in 2008 with an exclusive publishing partner Mail.Ru who still promotes the game in Russia and CIS. In 2009 the game was also exclusively published by Bigpoint in Germany, Austria and Switzerland. After 2 years exclusive publishing license of Bigpoint expired and Datcroft Games signed direct distribution agreements with other large media partners. In 2010 Aeria launched an English version in a close beta, yet Datcroft Games took a step to publish and distribute the game in-house.
