= Mission Against Terror =

2011 video game

- Developer(s): Kingsoft Dalian JingCai Studio
- Publisher(s): Wicked Interactive / Suba Games CiB Net Station; Winner Online; M1 Games; Sabay PT. Winner Interactive
- Engine: Unreal Engine
- Platform(s): Microsoft Windows
- Release: NA: July 8, 2011; EU: July 8, 2011
- Genre(s): Action-adventure, First-person shooter
- Mode(s): Multiplayer

Mission Against Terror, also known as M.A.T, is a multiplayer, free-to-play FPS. Launched into closed beta by Suba Games on September 3, 2010, it quickly got the attention of many MMO media sites to giveaway closed beta keys. Mission Against Terror entered into open beta on September 19, 2010, followed by its commercial launch on July 8, 2011.

== Gameplay ==
Mission Against Terror is similar to commercial games such as Counter-Strike, Call of Duty, and Ghost Recon 2. The game offers quite a few different modes of gameplay including deathmatch and team deathmatch, along with unique game modes against computer-controlled bots such as AI Mode, Dragon Emperor Mode, Hybrids, Inferno(I-II), Bounty Mode, Snake mode, Phantom Team, Mummy mode (Hero), Inferno II, Hide & Seek, Mummy mode and more. Mission Against Terror includes a variety of real-world weaponry, like the FAMAS, M4A1, AK47, Heckler & Koch HK416 the Heckler & Koch MP5.

The Arrow keys ←↑↓→ and [AWSD] controls movements while the mouse is used to look around and aim.

=== M.A.T availability by country ===
- MAT Mission Against Terror By Subagame - USA and Canada (No longer available)
- MAT Mission Against Terror 2 - Malaysia and Singapore
- Xoyo Mission Against Terror - China (No longer available)
- Attack Online - Cambodia
- Xshot Australia (No longer available)
- Xshot Indonesia (No longer available)
- Xshot Thailand
- Xshot Taiwan (No longer available)
