= Auto battler =

Video game genre

Dota Auto Chess

An auto battler is a subgenre of strategy video games that typically feature a two phase gameplay loop in which players create or build a team of units during a preparation phase, that then fight opposing team's units without any further direct input from the player during a battle phase.

The eponymous genre was created and popularized by Dota Auto Chess, a mod for Valve's Dota 2, in 2019 and saw other games in the genre released soon after by more established studios, such as Teamfight Tactics, Dota Underlords, and Hearthstone's Battlegrounds.

== Gameplay ==
Auto battler games typically feature multiple players competing against each other as individuals, similar to a battle royale. While the first auto battlers matched players only against other players in the same lobby, many modern takes on the genre use asynchronous matchmaking that allow players to face an opponent from anywhere in the world.

Generally, players are expected to field a team of persistent units with the task of assembling the strongest possible team. Game rounds alternate between a preparation phase, in which they buy, upgrade, and position their team, and a battling phase, in which their team is paired off against an opposing player's team for a 1-versus-1 battle. In combat, units automatically fight each other, typically with no additional player input. The player wins a battle when all the units of the enemy team are completely defeated, or when the enemy's health is brought to zero. After losing a battle, players often take some penalty, generally tracked by hit points or a match record. Players are eliminated from the match if they lose all of their hit point or lose too many battles. Winning a game typically requires the elimination of all other players in the match, if tracked by hit points, or achieving some number of victories in the battle phase, if tracked by match record. After each battle phase, a new game round starts and players return to the preparation phase to improve their team, typically by buying units. Commonly, players can only upgrade their units via some method that requires a certain amount of luck, like finding and purchasing multiple copies of one unit allows players to combine those copies into a stronger version of that same unit. Units may also be divided into multiple categories, with combat bonuses awarded for stacking multiple units of the same type.

== History ==
In January 2019, a group of Chinese developers known as Drodo Studio released Dota Auto Chess, a community-made custom game mode for Dota 2. The popularity of the mod, with it having over eight million players by May 2019, led to the creation of the genre that had a number of other games being released. The first games of the genre were initially developed as a game modes for already established video games, such as Teamfight Tactics from Riot Games, released within their MOBA game League of Legends. Later in 2019, both Drodo Studio and Valve developed their own standalone versions, Auto Chess and Dota Underlords, respectively. In November 2019, Blizzard Entertainment introduced their own take on the genre, Battlegrounds, in their card game Hearthstone.

Though the scope of the genre started narrow, closely following the mechanics of Dota Auto Chess, in the years since it released, the genre has evolved in new directions, particularly within the indie studio space. Such games include Super Auto Pets, Storybook Brawl, Backpack Battles, Teamfight Manager, Yi Xian, and The Bazaar. In July 2025, mobile game Clash Royale added Merge Tactics as a permanent game mode.
