= Philippine Esports Organization =

Governing body for esports in the Philippines

- Sport: Electronic sports
- Abbreviation: PeSO
- Founded: 2011
- Headquarters: Mandaluyong, Metro Manila
- President: Brian Lim
- Sponsor: Smart; Bren Esports; Mineski; Tier One Entertainment; Playbook Esports; TV5; TNC Events; Gariath Concepts
- (Philippines)

The Philippine Esports Organization (abbreviated as PeSO) is the national governing body for esports in the Philippines. It is a member of the International Esports Federation (IESF) since 2012 and is an associate member of the Philippine Olympic Committee (POC) since 2020.

It was established in 2011 by commissioner Brian Lim of the Cebu City Sports Commission following his attendance to a conference by the IeSF in Andong, South Korea

Its membership includes firms and other organizations under the eSports National Association of the Philippines (eSNAP) and the Philippine Southeast Asian Games Esports Union (PSEU).

PeSO opened its own headquarters in Mandaluyong in July 4, 2023.
