= Esports at the 2025 SEA Games =

- Venue: Sala Phra Kieo, Chulalongkorn University
- Location: Bangkok, Thailand
- Dates: 13–19 December

Esports was among the disciplines featured at the 2025 SEA Games in Thailand. Six events across four video games titles were contested.

Additionally demonstration events were held for Magic Chess: Go Go and Audition Next Level were held.

== Medal summary ==
=== Regular events ===
Event	Gold	Silver	Bronze
Arena of Valor (men's team)	Vietnam; Nguyễn Huy Hoàng; Khưu Khắc Bình Khánh; Nguyễn Quốc Huy; Phạm Nhật Hào; Lê Thành Duy; Tô Văn Dũng	Thailand; Sittikorn Somwan; Sorawit Srisamran; Anuruk Saengjan; Yosapat Khunnen; Danainat Rungpanich; Suniti Singhatanatgige	Laos; Anoulak Inmixay; Phouthasen Savanh; Bounkeuth Khanmalay; Chanthaxay Soundavong; Phoutthasone Vanisouvong
Mobile Legends: Bang Bang (men's team)	Philippines; Sanford Vinuya; Karl Nepomuceno; Alston Pabico; Kiel Soriano; Jaypee Dela Cruz; John Carlo Roma	Malaysia; Idreen Bin Abdul Jamal; Muhammad Haqqullah Ahmed Shahrul Zaman; Hazziq Danish Bin Mohamad Rizwan; Ealtond Rayner; Muhammad Qayyum Ariffin Bin Mohd Suhairi; Muhammad Danish Fitri Bin Razman	Indonesia; Leonardo Prasetyo Agung; Aldhia Fahmi Aranda; Riski; Yonathan Cin; Yehezkiel Wiseman Hamonangan; Christian Widy Wardhana Hartono
Free Fire (mixed team)	Thailand; Chirasak Moonsarn; Ratchanon Kunrayason; Mariwat Panyawai; Rachata Saethian; Piyapon Boonchuay	Indonesia; Adam Ramdani; Erwin B Kahfi Alfathan; Muhammad Raehan; Rafli Aidil Fitrah	Indonesia; Abi Siliwangi Jaya Kusuma; Wira Gunawan; Abdullah Kamal Hasibuan; Muh Haidir Al; Muhammad Fikri Haikal
EA Sports FC Online (mixed team)	Thailand; Teedech Songsaisakul; Phatanasak Varanan; Sorawit Rotjanasinlapin; Jifree Baikadem	Vietnam; Nguyễn Hoàng Hiệp; Phan Tấn Sang; Lê Anh Tuấn; Nguyễn Quý Duy	Indonesia; Ega Rahmaditya; Dwiga Meyza Arnandha; Muhammad Dzaky Firdaus
Arena of Valor (women's team)	Vietnam; Bùi Nguyễn Hoa Tranh; Choi Minh Châu; Đỗ Kỳ Duyên; Nguyễn Diệu Linh; Nguyễn Thanh Duyên; Nguyễn Thị Huyền Trang	Laos; Daofon Phounsavanh; Tookta Pathammavong; Penghom Simmavong; Phoyphailin Somsamouth; Soudsada Vilaymanyvong	Timor-Leste; Lucia Ventura Barreto de Jesus Pereira; Expedina dos Reis Soares; Aprilinha Teni Machado Maia Gama; Timorina Teni Maia; Fanencia Moreira Ximenes
Mobile Legends: Bang Bang (women's team)	Malaysia; Qurratul Ain Nurfarisha Bt Mohd Nizam; Afrina Balqis Binti Ibdhi Har Ali; Hanis Wahidah Mohamad Dashuki; Queenie Lim Mae Shen; Sharifah Alia Husna Syed Fakrrurozi	Philippines; Gwyneth Berdin Diagon; Kaye Maerylle Alpuerto; Rica Fatima Amores; Clarisse Nicole Cordova; Mery Christine Vivero	Indonesia; Venny Lim; Viroelle Valencia Chen; Michelle Denise Siswanto; Cindy Laurent Siswanto; Vivi Indrawaty

=== Demonstration events ===
Event	Gold	Silver	Bronze
Magic Chess: Go Go (pairs)	Malaysia; Muhamad Arif Bin Baharun; Fazley Chong	Philippines; Rollewis Daniel Ilarde; John Laurence Ruiz	Indonesia; Mochamad Ryan Batistuta; Budiono Wong
Audition Next Level (mixed team)	Vietnam	Thailand	Vietnam
Audition Next Level (mixed team)	Vietnam	Thailand	Philippines
Audition Next Level (men's individual)	Thailand	Vietnam	Vietnam
Audition Next Level (women's individual)	Vietnam	Vietnam	Thailand

== Medal table ==
* Host nation (Thailand)

Rank	Nation	Gold	Silver	Bronze	Total
1	Thailand*	2	1	0	3
1	Vietnam	2	1	0	3
3	Malaysia	1	1	0	2
3	Philippines	1	1	0	2
5	Indonesia	0	1	4	5
6	Laos	0	1	1	2
7	Timor-Leste	0	0	1	1
Totals (7 entries)		6	6	6	18

== Cheating incident ==
Thai esports athlete Naphat Warasin, also known by the handle "Tokyogurl", was caught downloading unauthorized third-party software during a team match between Thailand and Vietnam in the women's Arena of Valor match, and was promptly expelled from the tournament. The Thai team were subsequently withdrawn while leading their lower-bracket final against Laos 1-0.

A lifetime ban was imposed on Naphat by game publisher Garena, while her talent agency terminated her contract. Thailand lost their match against Vietnam, and after the Thai team's withdrawal mid-match, Laos had a walkover to the final, losing to Vietnam.

Naphat, along with her accomplice, Kong Sutprom, pleaded guilty and both were given a three-month confinement sentence. Kong was found to have played for Naphat during the tournament.
