= Esports at the 2023 SEA Games =

- Venue: Nagaworld and Olympia Mall
- Location: Phnom Penh, Cambodia
- Dates: 6 – 15 May

Esports at the 2023 SEA Games took place from 6 to 15 May in Cambodia.

Nine medals were contested in esports which consisted of five games and nine events. Participating nations, could only enter in seven out of nine events. Host Cambodia could enter all nine events.

== Medal table ==
* Host nation (Cambodia)

Rank	Nation	Gold	Silver	Bronze	Total
1	Indonesia	3	2	0	5
2	Cambodia*	3	1	1	5
3	Philippines	2	1	3	6
4	Vietnam	1	2	4	7
5	Singapore	1	0	1	2
6	Malaysia	0	2	2	4
7	Thailand	0	0	2	2
8	Laos	0	0	1	1
8	Myanmar	0	0	1	1
Totals (9 entries)		10	8	15	33

== Medal summary ==
=== PC ===
Event	Gold	Silver	Bronze
Attack Online 2 (Note: Cambodian release of Mission Against Terror) (individual)	Sao Rithchesda; Cambodia	Sron Chanthoeun; Cambodia	Nattapon Nakpinpart; Thailand
Attack Online 2 (team)	Cambodia; Tea Sophanal; Bol Visal; Sao Rithchesda; Sron Chanthoeun; Ouk Sotha; Mao Straboth; Chea Sokpich	Malaysia; Hariq Izzat Amirul; Iqbal Harun; Reydza Pyar Dasha; Shah Rullah Muadzah; Fazrul Izwan; Syahmi Aiman	Thailand; Puwanat Sangdang; Akharapol Sriwiset; Nattapon Nakpinpart; Natthaphong Chueachai; Jeerasak Sengraka
Crossfire	Vietnam; Bùi Đình Văn; Lương Đức Tuấn; Huỳnh Quốc Khánh; Mai Thanh Phong; Lê Văn Sơn; Đàm Việt Hưng	Indonesia; Jason Adrian; Kautsar Faruqurrohman Ekatama; Muhammad Adrian Setiawan; Riddho Putra Muharam; Samuel Santosa; Ivan Supardi	Philippines (Note: Philippines won over Laos in the third place playoff; However both teams were still awarded bronze medals after Laos won over Cambodia in another bronze medal match.); Aldrin Borabon; Christian Amores; John Kenneth Alde; Justine Perez; Matthew Arnaez; Arthur Tecson
Crossfire	Vietnam; Bùi Đình Văn; Lương Đức Tuấn; Huỳnh Quốc Khánh; Mai Thanh Phong; Lê Văn Sơn; Đàm Việt Hưng	Indonesia; Jason Adrian; Kautsar Faruqurrohman Ekatama; Muhammad Adrian Setiawan; Riddho Putra Muharam; Samuel Santosa; Ivan Supardi	Laos; Theppysa Chitthatalat; Anousone Kodxai; Saravouth Kommadam; Vongphachan Phoummeethone; Silisinh Siliphone; Kingkeo Thavixay
Valorant (Note: Indonesia initially forfeited the final against Singapore after accusing their opponents of taking advantage of a bug. Singapore disputed and said their tactic was not illegal. Both teams were eventually awarded gold medals after a review.)	Singapore; Yeoh Chun Ting; Ingram Tan Ying Xuan; Marcus Tan; Rodman Yap; Tidus Goh; Aryton Bryan Soh	no medal awarded	Philippines (Note: Philippines won over Vietnam in the third place playoff; However both teams were still awarded bronze medals.); Nathaniel Cabero; Bhreyanne Reyes; Jose Eduardo Jamir; Xavier Juan; Mark Anthony Tuling; George Lachica
Valorant	Indonesia; Delbert Tanoto; Sheldon Andersen Chandra; Kevin Gunawan; Oliver Budi Wangge; Nanda Rizana; Bryan Carlos Setiawan; Willy Ivandra	no medal awarded	Vietnam; Nguyễn Nhất Thống; Phạm Huỳnh Toàn Quốc; Nguyễn Văn Tiến; Nguyễn Trung Tín; Ngô Công Anh; Hoàng Trung Đức; Nguyễn Nam

=== Mobile ===
Event	Gold	Silver	Bronze
League of Legends: Wild Rift	Philippines; Chammy Nazarrea; Justine Tan; Aaron Bingay; Golden Dajao; Reniel Angara; Gerald Gelacio	Vietnam; Trần Hồng Phúc; Bùi Minh Mạnh; Hoàng Tiến Nhật; Hồ Trung Hậu; Trần Gia Huy; Nguyễn Trung Đức; Đặng Nhật Tân	Singapore; Jing Kai Wong; Kenneth Goh Kai Yang; Tan Yee Khai; Wee Kiat Chua; Yew Ming Alex Tan; Wyi Shawn Lim
PUBG Mobile (individual)	Tra Chhany; Cambodia	Alan Raynold Kumaseh; Indonesia	Nguyễn Đình Chiến; Vietnam
PUBG Mobile (individual)	Tra Chhany; Cambodia	Alan Raynold Kumaseh; Indonesia	Abdul Barode; Philippines
PUBG Mobile (team)	Indonesia; Tengku M. Septiadi Ardiansyah; Fazriel Haikal Aditya; Muhammad Afriza; Teuku Muhammad Kausar; Alan Raynold Kumaseh	Vietnam; Đinh Dương Thành; Mạc Anh Hào; Vũ Hoàng Hưng; Ngô Đình Quang Anh; Phan Văn Đông	Vietnam (Note: Vietnam 2 finished third and Malaysia 1 finished fourth on the total standings; However both teams were still awarded bronze medals.); Bùi Xuân Trường; Nguyễn Quốc Cường; Lê Văn Quang; Hoàng Vĩ Quang; Nguyễn Đình Chiến
PUBG Mobile (team)	Indonesia; Tengku M. Septiadi Ardiansyah; Fazriel Haikal Aditya; Muhammad Afriza; Teuku Muhammad Kausar; Alan Raynold Kumaseh	Vietnam; Đinh Dương Thành; Mạc Anh Hào; Vũ Hoàng Hưng; Ngô Đình Quang Anh; Phan Văn Đông	Malaysia; Mohd Irzam Aman Zaini; Mohd Nabil Nazaruddin; Muhd Daim Rosli; Muhd Dhiya Ulhaq Arasz; Nadzrul Abdul Sagal
Mobile Legends: Bang Bang (men's team)	Philippines; David Canon; Michael Sayson; Angelo Arcangel; Marco Requitiano; Rowgien Unigo; Nowee Macasa	Malaysia; Idreen Abdul Jamal; Zul Hisham Noor; Irwandy Lim; Arif Abdul Halim; Danial Fuad; Nazhan Nor; Syafizan Najmi	Myanmar; Kyaw Zin Bo; Min Ko Ko; Pay Hein Ko; Pyae Sone Khant; Swan Htet Aung; Ye Naung Oo; Zayawin Paing
Mobile Legends: Bang Bang (men's team)	Philippines; David Canon; Michael Sayson; Angelo Arcangel; Marco Requitiano; Rowgien Unigo; Nowee Macasa	Malaysia; Idreen Abdul Jamal; Zul Hisham Noor; Irwandy Lim; Arif Abdul Halim; Danial Fuad; Nazhan Nor; Syafizan Najmi	Cambodia; Cheang Piseth; Khoun Amey; Kosal Piseth; Nhem Chandavan; Pich Sopheak; Sok Roth; Ty Oudom
Mobile Legends: Bang Bang (women's team)	Indonesia; Cindy Laurent Siswanto; Isnaini Nurfajri Machdita; Michelle Denise Siswanto; Venny Lim; Viorelle Valencia Chen; Vivi Indrawaty	Philippines; Kaye Alpuerto; Rica Amores; Alexandria Dardo; Gwyneth Diagon; Sheen Perez; Mery Vivero	Malaysia (Note: Malaysia won over Vietnam in the third place playoff; However both teams were still awarded bronze medals.); Anatasha Norman; Hanis Wahidah Dashuki; Nur Afrina Syuhada Shaltut; Nurul Effa Fauzana Fauzi; Sharifah Alia Husna; Vanessa Natasha Abdullah; Wan Nur Adibah Humairah
Mobile Legends: Bang Bang (women's team)	Indonesia; Cindy Laurent Siswanto; Isnaini Nurfajri Machdita; Michelle Denise Siswanto; Venny Lim; Viorelle Valencia Chen; Vivi Indrawaty	Philippines; Kaye Alpuerto; Rica Amores; Alexandria Dardo; Gwyneth Diagon; Sheen Perez; Mery Vivero	Vietnam; Lê Ngọc Tâm Nhi; Lương Khánh Hoà; Nguyễn Thảo My; Nông Thị Ngọc Ánh; Phạm Thu Hằng; Phan Thị Bích Ngọc; Vũ Huyền Anh
