= Mobile Legends: Bang Bang =

Multiplayer online battle arena mobile game

- Logo since 21 December 2024
- Developer: Moonton
- Publishers: Moonton; Elex Technology
- Designer: Skyhook
- Engine: Unity
- Platforms: Android; iOS; iPadOS; HarmonyOS
- Release: Android: WW: 14 July 2016; iOS; iPadOS: WW: 9 November 2016
- Genre: MOBA
- Mode: Multiplayer

Mobile Legends: Bang Bang (MLBB), (Note: Known in India as Moba Legends: 5v5!) commonly referred to simply as Mobile Legends (ML), is a multiplayer online battle arena (MOBA) game developed and published by Chinese developer Moonton. Since its release in 2016, MLBB has been free-to-play and is monetized through purchasable character and cosmetic customization. The game is primarily played on smartphones and tablets and is available for iOS, Android and HarmonyOS.

In its core modes, Classic and Ranked, the game places two teams of five players against each other in real time, with matchmaking usually taking 20 to 60 seconds (usually depends on how high your rank is) and matches lasting between 12 and 20 minutes on average. Following the classic MOBA format, players compete across three lanes, the goal to destroy the opposing base while defending their own and securing objectives to gain an advantage. Outcomes are determined by player skill, strategy, and teamwork rather than paid progression. The game also features a Brawl mode, in which teams compete on a single lane using randomly assigned heroes in shorter, fast-paced matches, typically played casually or to complete in-game tasks.

Following its success, Moonton has tapped into the esports scene with the creation of several regional tournaments dubbed as Mobile Legends: Bang Bang Professional League (MPL) that serves as a qualifier for the Mobile Legends World Championships from teams worldwide. The game is particularly popular in East and Southeast Asia and was among the six titles selected for the inaugural esports medal event at the 2019 Southeast Asian Games (SEA Games). It has since continued as a featured title at the 2021, 2023 and 2025 editions. The game has also seen some popularity in Europe. In January 2026, the Esports World Cup Foundation (EWCF) announced the game as the first of the 16 "world-class titles" that national teams will compete in at the inaugural Esports Nations Cup 2026 (ENC). The game will also debut as a medaled event at the 2026 Asian Games.

In 2026, MLBB Esports transitions into a five-region structure—Southeast Asia (SEA); Eastern Europe and Central Asia (EECA); Europe, the Middle East and Africa (EMEA); East Asia (EA); and the Americas (AMER). This framework unifies the global MLBB Esports ecosystem while empowering each region through tailored infrastructure and talent development pathways.

The M7 World Championship, held January 3-25, 2026 in Jakarta, Indonesia, became the most-watched mobile esports tournament in history. According to Esports Charts, the Grand Finals reached over 5.68 million peak concurrent viewers—a new record for mobile esports. June 24, the MLBB Asian Games Qualifiers became the most-watched esports tournament in Asian Games history by generating 9.1 million hours watched. The Grand Finals of rebranded MLBB Women's International (MWI) at 2026 Esports World Cup in Paris reached over 565k peak concurrent users, setting a new record for EWC women's esports. MLBB Mid-Season Cup (MSC) also set a viewership record at the 2026 Esports World Cup (EWC), reaching 2.88 million peak concurrent viewers (PCV)—the highest figure of any tournament at EWC 2026.

In October 2026, Mobile Legends: Bang Bang marked its 10th anniversary with events across 10 countries in Asia, Europe, and Latin America. Activities included community gatherings, cosplay events, live performances, and interactive installations.

Originally titled Mobile Legends: 5v5 MOBA, the game was first released in 2016 and became widely popular, as it was the first fully mobile-based MOBA with no direct competition, albeit not the first of its kind due to being released later than other games such as Vainglory. It however faced some criticism for its perceived similarities to League of Legends, which at the time had no official mobile version. As a result, Riot Games filed lawsuits against Moonton for alleged copyright infringement in 2017 and 2022. While they were awarded some damages, they failed to have the game removed. A 2022 lawsuit in the United States was dismissed, with the court ruling that the case should be heard in China. Ultimately, Riot Games and Moonton reached a settlement in 2024, resolving all intellectual property disputes. In 2020, the game was banned in India following the 2020 China–India skirmishes, though it is still played via virtual private networks (VPNs) and crossed 1 billion downloads worldwide. In 2025, it faced a brief, unenforced United States ban under the Protecting Americans from Foreign Adversary Controlled Applications Act due to its ByteDance ownership. This association was severed in 2026 when Moonton was acquired by the Saudi-based Savvy Games Group.

== Gameplay ==
Mobile Legends: Bang Bang is a multiplayer online battle arena (MOBA) game designed for smartphones and tablets. The game is free-to-play and is only monetized through in-game purchases such as characters and skins. Each player can control a selectable character, called a Hero, with unique abilities and traits. There are six roles that define the main purpose of heroes: Tank, Marksman, Assassin, Fighter, Mage, and Support. These roles determine the responsibilities of players for their respective teams. Players can also set specific builds for heroes which include in-game items and emblems.

=== Classic and Ranked ===
Overview of the in-game map

The two main modes in the game are Classic and Ranked. In Ranked, two teams of five players go against each other in real-time. Players will be matched in correspondence with their current ranking. There are seven ranks in the game with Warrior being the lowest followed by Elite, Master, Grandmaster, Epic, Legend, and the highest rank, Mythic. Mythic itself has sub-ranks which are Mythical Honor, Mythical Glory, and Mythical Immortal. A player can only invite and form a team with other players of similar rank or players that are one rank higher or lower.

Taking down the opposing base is the main goal to achieve victory. There are three lanes in the game: The gold lane (top), exp lane (bottom), and the mid lane. Depending on what side of the map (blue or red) a player starts on, the gold and exp lanes will be switching places. Between each lane is the jungle. The jungle can be divided into four parts: two between the enemy's lanes and two between a player's team lanes. The jungle has different creeps and monsters that offer buffs, experience, and gold.

A player cannot attack the enemy base directly without taking down opposing turrets in at least one lane first. Each lane has three turrets that shoot at heroes and deal a ton of damage. To attack them without taking damage, a player needs help from their team's minions. Minions spawn every 30 seconds at the team's bases and travel down along each lane. The team to successfully destroy all the turrets in one or all lanes will increase their chances of destroying the opposite team's base.

In Classic, the gameplay is similar. However, winning or losing a match won't affect a player's ranking. Players can also form a whole team regardless of their rank differences and freely choose any heroes along with weekly free ones and any trial card they possess.

=== Other modes ===
Arcade is an additional game mode in Mobile Legends: Bang Bang that can time-to-time be playable during special events, holidays, or other occasions. The mode feature various strategy based sub-games.

Brawl is a game mode where players are given two random heroes in their inventory at the start of the game. This mode contains only one lane with two turrets defending the base of both teams. Items can only be bought inside the base and players that leave it cannot re-enter unless when respawning. A special variation called Shadow Brawl is released from time to time. The difference is players at the start of the game will choose from the same set of heroes. The hero with the most votes will be used by the entire team.

As an auto battler game, Magic Chess is about strategy. A player, represented by a "commander", faces seven other players over the course of several rounds on a chess-like battlefield. Instead of fighting one's self, a player buys, equips, and lines up units that constitute Mobile Legends: Bang Bang Heroes. Apart from different types of "synergies", a player has to delegate the random items they gained while also taking care of the specific position of each hero on the battlefield. Additionally, a player can increase their gold income by economizing or going on winning/losing streaks. In the end, a player has to eliminate the other competing players by reducing the health points of their commander to zero. Depending on a player's placement, they will gain a certain amount of rank points after the game. Starting at Warrior, players can rank up to Mythic similar to the core game's ranking system. In update patch note 1.4.60, Magic Chess was included as a permanent arcade game mode, after temporarily being added in January 2020. In 2025, Magic Chess was removed from Mobile Legends: Bang Bang and relaunched in a separate app as Magic Chess: Go Go. The decision to create a standalone app was attributed to the game mode's popularity, a desire to expand features, and plans to launch Esports championships for Magic Chess: Go Go.

Various arcade games use the same battlefield as rank/classic mode but with twists. These modes include Mayhem, where all heroes' abilities are enhanced and a player starts the game at level four, Death battle, where players will play different heroes in a single match, and Mirror, where players of the same team will be using the same hero throughout the match based on majority voting.

Other game modes include an option to fight against AI heroes, custom 5v5 battles with other players, 1v1, and hero training.

== Development ==
After Moonton's staff of 20 finished developing its first game called Magic Rush: Heroes, released in 2015 to commercial success, they proceeded with developing the company's next project, a mobile multiplayer online battle arena (MOBA) game later titled Mobile Legends. The staff's experience with engineering Magic Rush: Heroes for a global market, such as customizing its features for the differing cultures and state of telecommunications of various countries, became beneficial for them to effectively design Mobile Legends as an appealing game for global players. Mobile Legends was released by Moonton with the subtitle "5v5 MOBA" on 14 July 2016. The game was distributed by Elex Tech in the United States. However, after the lawsuit from Riot Games in 2017, Moonton has removed the game from Google Play and re-released it as Mobile Legends: Bang Bang.

On 18 July 2019, Moonton announced Mobile Legends: Bang Bang 2.0 via its Epicon 2019 conference. MLBB 2.0 consists of an engine upgrade to a more recent version of the Unity game engine from version 4 to version 2017. Moonton also promised faster loading times and start-up speed of up to 60%. Other improvements of the update include reduced lag, improved character modelling, and the new in-game map "Imperial Sanctuary". The update helped increase the cross-platform social media views earned by the game from 56 million in September 2019 to 76 million the next month making the game ranked fourth of all channels from all gaming brands in the US.

In a report published in November 2019, Check Point discovered that the Google Play package for Mobile Legends: Bang Bang was affected by the then long-known CVE-2015-8271, which could have potentially allowed arbitrary code execution on the server end. This vulnerability originates in RTMPdump 2.4, the code for which was likely adapted through libraries for the in-game livestreaming functionality. Other apps discovered to contain the vulnerability included Facebook, Messenger and SHAREit.

In early 2020, the game was heavily affected by third-party plugins and scripts that allowed map-hacks prompting Moonton to publicly publish punishments made through its social media accounts revealing the account ID of the banned players. Some accounts were also hacked due to exploits to Device ID that may have been due to the third-party scripts according to an official statement from Moonton. In response, patch 1.4.86 enabled two-factor authentication when logging in to a new device.

Announced on 5 June 2020, Project NEXT was Moonton's next big project slated for Mobile Legends: Bang Bang's 5th anniversary. This included changes in user interface, revamps to several older heroes' 3D models, skill sets, stories, and voice lines. They announced a method called "Smart Targeting" to further improve accuracy. There were multiple changes that were specifically aimed at providing players with a much-improved gameplay experience, including the launch of a revamped version of the Brawl game mode. New login events, exclusive cosmetics, and a new hero was introduced with this update. Project NEXT was divided into three phases: The first phase was released on 22 September 2020, the second phase was released on 15 June 2021, and the third phase was released on 21 September 2021.

The game has since crossed 1 billion downloads, with a peak monthly active users of 100 million.

== Characters and lore ==
Land of Dawn excerpt from the app

Mobile Legends: Bang Bang initially had 10 selectable characters, referred to as Heroes, upon its release in 2016. It later grew to 70 by November 2018, and as of June 17, 2026, there are 133 heroes, with the newest, Hirara, debuting in season 41.

With the game's popularity exponentially growing in Southeast Asia, Moonton has released several heroes based on actual people and characters from Southeast Asian histories and folklore to further increase the game's appeal, introducing heroes such as Lapu Lapu (Philippines), Minsitthar (based on Kyansittha; Myanmar), Kadita (based on Nyai Roro Kidul; Indonesia), and Badang (Malaysia). In June 2017, Moonton approached Is Yuniarto, an Indonesian comic book artist best known for Garudayana (a Javanese action fantasy comic series), to include Gatotkaca from the comics as a playable character in Mobile Legends: Bang Bang. Gatotkaca is based loosely on Ghatotkacha, a character from the Hindu epic Mahabharata. In November 2020, Moonton announced Filipino professional boxer Manny Pacquiao as the brand ambassador for Mobile Legends: Bang Bang in the Philippines. To commemorate the partnership, Moonton also launched a hero based on Pacquiao in the game known as Paquito.

Occasionally, Moonton releases multiple skin series with accompanying stories separate from the central lore. Heroes are usually grouped into Squads; the most notable of which are the superhero and supervillain squads that are comic book-inspired. On 10 January 2022, Moonton announced their first anime-themed skin series called The Aspirants, featuring Japanese voice actresses Yoshino Nanjō and Nana Mizuki with original music from composer Yasuharu Takanashi.

== Related media ==
=== Collaborations ===
Over the years, Mobile Legends: Bang Bang has collaborated with different franchises to release purchasable limited edition character customization called skins.

In March 2019, Moonton approached SNK for collaboration, introducing characters from The King of Fighters game series as skins in the game. These skins have unique ability effects and voice-overs and can be obtained through a bingo mechanic event. The first series skins released in the game were Iori Yagami for the hero Chou, Leona Heidern for Karina, and Athena Asamiya for Guinevere. The second series skins released were Kula Diamond for the hero Aurora, K' for Gusion, and Orochi Chris for Dyrroth. The third series, released in 2024, featured a Mai Shiranui skin for the hero Masha, Kyo Kusanagi for Valir, and Terry Bogard for Paquito.

In July 2021, Mobile Legends: Bang Bang released two skin in collaboration with the Star Wars franchise: Master Yoda for the hero Cyclops and Darth Vader for Argus. In December 2021, the collaboration returned and a third epic skin, Obi-Wan Kenobi for the hero Alucard, was released. The event was a time-limited purchase and exclusive in Southeast Asia and Japan. In 2022, a 3rd phase for the event debuted with a First Order Jet Trooper skin for the hero Kimmy, with this event also being restricted to specific regions. The collaboration returned again in September 2024, with the same skins re-released for sale.

In August 2021, Mobile Legends: Bang Bang released a skin collaboration with the media franchise Transformers which included Optimus Prime, Megatron, and Bumblebee for the heroes Johnson, Granger, and X-Borg respectively. The event was divided into four phases spanning from August to November with lottery and exchange-type mechanics. In 2022, a second phase was introduced, featuring Starscream as Aldous, Grimlock as Roger, and Soundwave & Ravage as Popol and Kupa.

In February 2022, Mobile Legends: Bang Bang announced its collaboration with Sanrio which featured the characters Hello Kitty as an Angela skin, Badtz-Maru for Claude, Cinnamoroll for Floryn, and Pompompurin for Chang'e. This collaboration event re-ran in 2025 and 2026.

In August 2022, Mobile Legends: Bang Bang announced a skin collaboration with Kung Fu Panda. It featured three new exclusive skins: General Kai for the hero Thamuz, Po Ping for Akai, and Lord Shen for Ling. Due to failed negotiations with the copyright holders, the event has yet to re-run.

In October 2022, Mobile Legends: Bang Bang debuted their collaboration with Shueisha and the Saint Seiya manga franchise. This event's format differed- each skin had two alternate versions depicting a bronze and gold version of the character. Pegasus Seiya and Saggitarius Seiya for the hero Badang, Phoenix Ikki and Leo Ikki for Valir, and Dragon Shiryū and Libra Shiryū for Chou. The gold skins were obtainable via a draw event, with Pegasus Seiya (Badang) garunteed on the first ten draws, and Phoenix Ikki (Valir) and Dragon Shiryū (Chou) purchasable in the diamond shop. This event reran in July 2025 with revamped skin effects.

In February 2023, Mobile Legends: Bang Bang and Jujutsu Kaisen announced its third anime-themed collaboration skin featuring Yuji Itadori for Yin, Megumi Fushiguro for Julian, Satoru Gojo for Xavier, and Nobara Kugisaki for Melissa. The collaboration was a long time coming after a long-year teaser through in-game survey. The collaboration was returned in June 2024 with an updated visual effects on Yin's ultimate skill features Sukuna when using Yuji Itadori skin.

In January 2024, Mobile Legends: Bang Bang and Attack on Titan announced its collaboration featuring Eren Yeager for Yin, Mikasa Ackerman for Fanny, and Levi Ackerman as Martis.

In January 2025, Mobile Legends: Bang Bang and Hunter x Hunter announced its collaboration featuring Killua Zoldyck as Harith, Gon Freecss as Dyrroth, Hisoka Morow as Cecillion, and Kurapika as Julian.

In May 2025, Mobile Legends: Bang Bang and Naruto: Shippuden announced its collaboration featuring Naruto Uzumaki as Lukas, Sasuke Uchiha as Suyou, Kakashi Hatake as Hayabusa, Sakura Haruno as Kalea, and Gaara as Vale. New collaboration features were also released for sale, including special loading screen effects and a "Gamakichi Sacred Statue", which replaced towers in game. In March 2026, phase 2 of the collaboration was released with Itachi Uchiha as Julian and Minato Namikaze as Gusion, as well as the return of all previous skins.

In November 2025, Mobile Legends: Bang Bang launched a global collaboration with Nickelodeon's SpongeBob SquarePants as part of its annual "Friend Fest" campaign. The event introduced themed in-game content inspired by Bikini Bottom, including playable skins such as Cyclops as SpongeBob SquarePants and Gloo as Patrick Star, alongside battle emotes, effects, and limited-time rewards. The campaign also featured the "Undersea Restaurant" minigame, where players could complete tasks with friends to earn event currency and unlock rewards. Additional activities included friendship-themed missions and social gameplay features designed to encourage team-based participation and community engagement. The collaboration was made available worldwide, with some regional restrictions, including in Russia.

=== Regional partnerships and collaborations ===
In May 2021, Mobile Legends: Bang Bang entered a partnership with McDonald’s Malaysia in connection with the Season 7 playoffs of the Mobile Legends Professional League (MPL) Malaysia. It featured promotional campaigns of McDonald's products, alongside in-game rewards such as exclusive skins and currency for players during the event period.

In August 2021, Mobile Legends: Bang Bang collaborated with Indonesian brand Sour Sally to launch a themed frozen yogurt campaign under the "Fantastic Flavors of Local Legends" promotion. The collaboration introduced two limited-edition yogurt variants inspired by MLBB heroes Kadita and Lancelot, namely "Kadita Freeze" (inspired by es doger) and "Lancelot Like-It-A-Lot" (inspired by es cendol). The products were developed as part of a promotional campaign combining local Indonesian flavors with MLBB character branding and were made available through Sour Sally outlets in Indonesia.

In October 2024, AF Payments, Inc. partnered with Moonton and UniPin to launch a limited-edition series of co-branded Beep cards featuring Mobile Legends: Bang Bang heroes. The collectible cards included multiple hero designs released in phases and came with unique codes that unlocked exclusive in-game items. The cards also functioned as fully usable stored-value transit cards for trains, buses, jeepneys, and retail payments in the Philippines, combining public transportation use with gaming-related collectibles.

In 2025, Mobile Legends: Bang Bang partnered with OPPO to launch the OPPO Smooth Legend Cup, a multi-country esports tournament held across the Asia-Pacific (APAC) region. The competition was open to players from countries including the Philippines, Indonesia, Malaysia, Thailand, Singapore, and Cambodia, with teams progressing through national qualifiers before advancing to an APAC Grand Finals held in Jakarta, Indonesia. The tournament featured a structured competitive format consisting of recruitment, store-level competitions, national finals, and a regional grand finals, with cash prizes awarded to top-performing teams.

In July 2025, Mobile Legends: Bang Bang partnered with Samsung to launch the first inter-country Galaxy Gaming Academy x Mobile Legends: Bang Bang Campus Series, a collegiate esports tournament held in Southeast Asia. The competition featured teams from the Philippines, Indonesia, Malaysia, and Singapore, with over 1,000 participating teams across national qualifiers. The grand finals were held in Jakarta, Indonesia, where the NU Bulldogs from the Philippines emerged as champions, defeating other top university teams in the region.

In December 2025, Mobile Legends: Bang Bang launched the "Friend Fest" campaign in the Philippines, featuring Filipino creators Ashtine Olviga, Rabine Angeles, and Angela Muji. The campaign included a short-form drama series, community-based events, and an in-game battle emote of Ashtine "Crush Mo Ko Noh?".

In January 2026, Mobile Legends: Bang Bang partnered with Visa and GCash to support Philippine representatives Team Liquid PH and Aurora Gaming PH in the M7 World Championship. The collaboration focused on strengthening fan engagement through nationwide initiatives, including the largest official M7 Watch Party held at the SM Mall of Asia Music Hall in Pasay City from January 23 to 25, 2026. The event featured live match screenings, on-ground activities, appearances by esports personalities and content creators, and exclusive rewards for attendees. The campaign also expanded to campuses across the Philippines through the M7 Watch Party Campus Edition, organized by MOONTON Student Leaders, with simultaneous watch events in multiple regions nationwide.

In February and March 2026, Mobile Legends: Bang Bang partnered with J&T Express Malaysia for the "Golden Month 2026" campaign, which featured the "Golden Mission: Kongsi Rezeki" livestream series. Prizes included devices such as the Oppo Reno15 F and Oppo A5 Pro 5G, along with in-game items like diamonds, exclusive skins, and merchandise.

In April 2026, Mobile Legends: Bang Bang launched several localized collaborations in the Philippines. The game partnered with the SexBomb Girls for its Summer Break campaign, featuring members Aira Bermudez, Rochelle Pangilinan, and Mhyca Bautista, which included a re-imagined "Halukay Ube" music video and the release of an in-game "Get, Get, Aw!" battle emote. In the same month, the game also collaborated with Jollibee, introducing an exclusive in-game battle emote of Jollibee obtainable through login rewards.

=== Spin-offs ===
On 31 July 2019, Moonton released a spin-off game titled Mobile Legends: Adventure, an idle role-playing video game where players start with a hero and unlock various features by progressing through a campaign. The game features several characters from Mobile Legends: Bang Bang.

Moonton released its first animated television series titled Legends of Dawn: The Sacred Stone directed by Ziaolong Zhang. It follows the story of Mobile Legends: Bang Bang's hero Claude and his monkey sidekick Dexter, as they steal an artifact from the Imperial Capital. The animated series premiered on Tencent's streaming services WeTV and Iflix on 5 September 2021, and made its television premiere on TV9 in Malaysia, NET. in Indonesia, and ABS-CBN Corporation's Kapamilya Channel and A2Z (owned by ZOE Broadcasting Network) in the Philippines on 19 September 2021.

In June 2024, Moonton released a comic book titled Mobile Legends: Outlaw written by Vancy and Limei and supervised by Adalo and Yingjie. It follows the story of Mobile Legends: Bang Bang's heroes Layla and Ixia, about Ixia joining the Eruditio Rangers and saving Dr. Rooney from The Chosen Order.

In November 2024, Moonton release a spin-off game based on MLBB heroes titled Magic Chess: Go Go (MCGG), set in the same universe as MLBB through its soft launch in Malaysia and Singapore. The game received 8 million registration on the soft launch, thus trigger imminent release in both countries. The first look of the game was presented on 14 December 2024, after Team Liquid ID sweep home 3–0 against Selangor Red Giants on lower bracket final in M6 World Championship.

In July 2025, Moonton announced that they are collaborating with Base FX and The Little Black Book Studios to make another Mobile Legends animated series that's in development, which will dive deep and expand the games lore and its Heroes.

== Esports ==
=== Domestic tournaments ===
==== Mobile Legends: Bang Bang Professional League (MPL) ====
Mobile Legends: Bang Bang Professional League (MPL) is a series of official regional tournaments that was established in 2018 that serve as qualifiers for MSC and the World Championship. The regions that received the first Professional League season were Indonesia, Philippines, Malaysia, Singapore, and Myanmar. However, Malaysia and Singapore shared the same league at that time until Singapore received its own league season in 2021. In August 2021, Moonton announced MPL Brazil, the first MPL league outside the SEA region. Cambodia also received its own MPL league, in partnership with Smart Axiata, the leading telecommunications operator in the region.

Regions outside Southeast Asia without an official MPL had their own qualifier tournaments such as the Mobile Legends: Bang Bang: Gulf Cup 2020 and M3 Arabia Major for the Middle East and North African region, and the M3 World Championship North American (NA) Qualifier 2021 for the North American region.

On 22 October 2024, MPL has made history becoming the first ever e-sports event to reached 1 billion hours of watching time, beating out its closest rivals such as League of Legends Worlds and League of Legends Champions Korea (LCK).

=== International tournaments ===
==== Mobile Legends: Bang Bang Mid Season Cup ====
The first official esports competition held by Moonton was the Mobile Legends: Bang Bang Southeast Asia Cup (MSC) in 2017. It is an annual Mobile Legends: Bang Bang esports tournament in Southeast Asia. The tournament consists of different teams from different countries in Southeast Asia such as Malaysia, Philippines, Indonesia, Thailand & Singapore (since 2017), Vietnam and Myanmar (since 2018), Cambodia and Laos (since 2019), and Middle East and North Africa region (since 2022). In 2017, teams were chosen only through a series of local qualifiers. However, starting 2018, participants were invited through local qualifiers and the top two teams from Southeast Asian countries with established Mobile Legends: Bang Bang Professional Leagues.

On 5 November 2020, One Esports and Moonton announced a new tournament called One Esports MPL Invitational (MPLI) where 20 invited teams will compete in a series of single elimination matches for a prize pool of US$100,000. On 15 December 2021, Moonton, in partnership again with One Esports, announced its first ever all-female esports tournament called the MLBB Women's Invitational (MWI) with a prize pool of US$15,000.

On 1 January 2024, the Mobile Legends: Bang Bang Road Map for 2024 was released on the official YouTube channel of Moonton games. The announcement saw the rebranding of the MSC cup to the "Mid-Season Cup", relinquishing the tournament's regional status to become another international tournament for Mobile Legends.

=== World championship ===
The Mobile Legends: Bang Bang World Championship, commonly referred to as M-Series and Worlds, is an annual international esports tournament wherein teams worldwide would be facing off each other to become the worldwide champion for Mobile Legends: Bang Bang. The first MLBB World Championship, dubbed as M1, was held in Axiata Arena in Kuala Lumpur, Malaysia from 15 to 17, November 2019. The competition featured 16 teams across the world who battled it out for a prize pool of US$250,000. The second world championship, dubbed as M2, was supposed to kick off in 2020 but was postponed due to the COVID-19 pandemic. It was later on rescheduled and was held at Shangri-La Hotel in Singapore in January 2021 with a prize pool of US$300,000. The third world championship, dubbed as M3, was held in Singapore for the second time and had an increase prize pool of US$800,000. It had a peak viewership of 3.18 million, breaking the record from M2.

The M7 event took place in Jakarta, Indonesia, where Aurora Gaming PH swept Indonesia's Alter Ego 4–0 to secure their first world title. The Grand Finals achieved a peak concurrent viewership of 5.68 million, setting a new record for mobile esports, previously held by Free Fire World Series 2021 Singapore for almost five years and becomes the fourth-highest most-viewed esports event ever. This record was broken three times during the two-day finals. The M8 Wild Card stage will be held in Thailand and the Grand Finals in Istanbul, Turkey, the first time the event will span both Asia and Europe.

All winning teams were given an exclusive honorary skin in-game from a hero of their choosing to commemorate their championship to which players can purchase for a limited time. Since M5, winner of the Finals MVP (FMVP) will received the skin for their signature hero. The first winner, David Charles "FlapTzy" Canon from AP Bren chose Paquito as his FMVP skin.

==== Mobile Legends: Bang Bang Women's Invitational ====
The Mobile Legends: Bang Bang Women's Invitational is the equivalent world championship for the all-female division of MLBB. The first two iterations of MWI were held online in 2022 and 2023 until in 2024, MWI was one of the two divisions for MLBB competing in the 2024 Esports World Cup. Since its establishment, Bigetron Era (now known as Team Vitality) has won the most titles with 3 while Smart Omega Empress (whose roster is now under NAVI) won the 2024 title over Vitality.

== Controversies ==
=== Alleged plagiarism ===
After the game's initial release, Riot Games suspected that the game Mobile Legends: 5v5 MOBA was imitating the intellectual property of League of Legends and contacted Google to remove the game from Google Play. Moonton then removed the game before Google could take it down and eventually relaunched it with the altered name Mobile Legends: Bang Bang on 9 November 2016.

In July 2017, Riot Games filed a lawsuit against Moonton because of copyright infringement, citing similarities between Mobile Legends and League of Legends. Riot Games also complained that the name title of Mobile Legends sounds confusingly similar to League of Legends. The case was dismissed in the Central District Court of California in the United States on account of forum non conveniens.

Tencent, Riot's parent company, on behalf of Riot Games, then filed a new, separate lawsuit directly targeting Moonton's CEO, Watson Xu Zhenhua (as he had previously worked in Tencent as a senior employee) in Shanghai No.1 Intermediate People's Court, for violating a law regarding Non-Compete Agreements, which ruled in Tencent's favor in July 2018, awarding them a settlement of $2.9 million (RMB19.4 million). In 2024, Riot Games and Moonton reached a settlement, with the former no longer disputing the game.

=== Ban in India ===
The game was banned in India on 29 June 2020 along with other applications of alleged Chinese origin in the aftermath of the 2020 China–India skirmishes. However, it has remained popular in the country, with many players in India circumventing the ban through the use of virtual private networks (VPNs). The game eventually returned on 24 April 2024 as Moba Legends: 5v5! under publisher Vizta Games on Android devices.

=== Non-competition in esports ===
In July 2021, Moonton has allegedly disallowed Mobile Legends: Bang Bang esports organizations to create teams for League of Legends: Wild Rift and was criticized by the Team Secret CEO that the move "cannot be good from a healthy ecosystem or competitive integrity standpoint." An unnamed source then later clarified that there is indeed an exclusivity contract but was only optional and that Moonton will give benefits to those who agree on the exclusivity. Some Mobile Legends: Bang Bang esports organizations still have teams for Wild Rift.

Ahead of MSC 2025, two players from the qualified team S8UL Esports (Note: Acquired BloodThristyKings' roster from North America region) were caught promoting an event for another rival MOBA mobile game, Honor of Kings. This resulted in the team being disqualified from the tournament due to no suitable replacement can be taken. Area77, who become runner-up in the North America qualifier, replace their slot in the tournament. The effect would be prolonged as North America didn't receive any slot for the M7 World Championship.

=== Preferability conflict with Blacklist International ===
In December 2021, following the triumph of esports team Blacklist International on M3, they were entitled to choose a specific hero for their championship skin. Team captain Johnmar "OhMyV33nus" Villaluna alleged on a live stream on 22 December, that their request to give the championship skin to the hero Estes was denied, claiming that the developers had to consider the "marketability" of the hero. Instead, Moonton asked for three heroes other than Estes as preference, meaning that Moonton will choose one from those three heroes for the M3 championship skin rather than Blacklist International's initial choice, Estes.

The hashtag #WeWantEstes trended on different social media platforms from the morning of 23 December, with Blacklist co-owners Tryke Gutierrez and Alodia Gosiengfiao and teams such as ECHO Philippines and Bren Esports joining the call for Moonton to rescind their decision. Other supporters vented their frustrations by giving Mobile Legends: Bang Bang the lowest rating on Google Play Store.

On 24 December, Moonton announced that Estes was ultimately chosen as the M3 skin.
