= Free Fire World Series – Global Finals 2024 =

Esports tournament

Tournament information
- Game: Free Fire
- Location: Brazil
- Dates: 8–24 November 2024
- Administrator: Garena
- Venue: Carioca Arena 1, Barra Olympic Park
- Participants: 18 teams
- Broadcast: YouTube, TikTok, Facebook
- Website: ffesports.com

Final positions
- Champion: (Brazil) Fluxo
- 1st runner-up: (Indonesia) RRQ Kazu
- 2nd runner-up: (Thailand) Buriram United Esports

Tournament statistics
- Matches played: 36
- MVP: Wassana

The Free Fire World Series – Global Finals 2024 (FFWS) is the sixth edition of Free Fire World Series, the annual international Garena Free Fire championship contested by the best teams across the world hosted by Garena. The tournament was held in November 2024. It was hosted in Rio De Janeiro, Brazil. This is the second time Brazil is host the tournament, first hosted in 2019. Magic Squad from Brazil are the defending champions.

The Grand Finals of the tournament achieved a peak online viewership of 751,237.

== Prize distribution ==
The total prize pool of $1,000,000 was distributed among the teams as follows:

Prize distribution
| Rank | Team | Prize money (USD) |
|---|---|---|
| 1st | Fluxo | $300,000 |
| 2nd | RRQ Kazu | $150,000 |
| 3rd | Buriram United | $70,000 |

== Overview ==
The Free Fire World Series uses the Squad Battle Royale mode available in the video game Free Fire. 48 players (12 teams each one having four players) airdrop onto an island without any weapons or armor. Once on the ground, players must search for weapons, armor, and med kits. Players can knock down players using the weapons they collected. The last team to survive wins the game. Players get points based on the number of eliminations and final ranking of their team.

== Qualification ==
On 14 July 2024, Team Falcons became the first team to qualify for the FFWS 2024 by winning the 2024 Esports World Cup – Free Fire tournament held in Riyadh, Saudi Arabia.

On 10 August 2024, WASK became the second team to qualify for the FFWS 2024 by winning the FFWS Middle East and Africa 2024 tournament.

On 16 September 2024, Fluxo became the third team to qualify for the FFWS 2024 by finishing top in the Group Stage of FFWS Brazil 2024 tournament.

On 22 September 2024, Rezurrection X Esports became the forth team to qualify for the FFWS 2024 by winning the FFWS Pakistan 2024 tournament.

On 28 September 2024, three more teams also qualified for the FFWS 2024 by finishing top three (other than Team Falcons, who already qualified) in FFWS Brazil 2024.

On 12 October 2024, three more teams also qualified for the FFWS 2024 by finishing top three in FFWS LATAM 2024.

On 13 October 2024, eight and most teams from any region also qualified for the FFWS 2024 by finishing top eight (other than Team Falcons, who already qualified) in FFWS South East Asia 2024.

| Team | Event | Date | Seeds | Region | Total times qualified | Last time qualified | Previous best performance |
|---|---|---|---|---|---|---|---|
| (Thailand) Team Falcons | 2024 Esports World Cup – Free Fire | 10 – 14 July 2024 | Champions | Global | 1 | —N/a | —N/a |
| (Morocco) WASK | FFWS Middle East and Africa 2024 | 18 July – 10 August 2024 | Champions | Middle East; Africa | 3 | 2023 | 12th Place (2022 (1st)) |
| (Pakistan) Rezurrection; X Esports | FFWS Pakistan 2024 | 21 – 22 September 2024 | Champions | Pakistan | 1 | —N/a | —N/a |
| (Brazil) Fluxo | FFWS Brazil 2024 | 20 April – 28 September 2024 | Group Stage Champions | Brazil | 2 | 2021 (1st) | 4th Place (2021 (1st)) |
| (Brazil) paiN Gaming | FFWS Brazil 2024 | 20 April – 28 September 2024 | Finals Top 3 | Brazil | 1 | —N/a | —N/a |
| (Brazil) Corinthians | FFWS Brazil 2024 | 20 April – 28 September 2024 | Finals Top 3 | Brazil | 2 | 2021 (1st) | Champions (2019) |
| (Brazil) E1 Sports | FFWS Brazil 2024 | 20 April – 28 September 2024 | Finals Top 3 | Brazil | 1 | —N/a | —N/a |
| (Mexico) Six Karma | FFWS LATAM 2024 | 22 March – 12 October 2024 | Top 3 | South America | 1 | —N/a | —N/a |
| (Mexico) RETA Esports | FFWS LATAM 2024 | 22 March – 12 October 2024 | Top 3 | South America | 1 | —N/a | —N/a |
| (Chile) CLG | FFWS LATAM 2024 | 22 March – 12 October 2024 | Top 3 | South America | 1 | —N/a | —N/a |
| (Thailand) Buriram United Esports | FFWS South East Asia 2024 Fall | 16 August – 13 October 2024 | Top 8 | South East Asia | 2 | 2023 | Runners-up (2023) |
| (Thailand) Twisted Minds | FFWS South East Asia 2024 Fall | 16 August – 13 October 2024 | Top 8 | South East Asia | 1 | —N/a | —N/a |
| (Thailand) Attack All Around | FFWS South East Asia 2024 Fall | 16 August – 13 October 2024 | Top 8 | South East Asia | 3 | 2022 (1st) | Champions (2022 (1st)) |
| (Vietnam) WAG | FFWS South East Asia 2024 Fall | 16 August – 13 October 2024 | Top 8 | South East Asia | 2 | 2023 | 5th Place (2023) |
| (Indonesia) RRQ Kazu | FFWS South East Asia 2024 Fall | 16 August – 13 October 2024 | Top 8 | South East Asia | 3 | 2023 | 4th Place (2023) |
| (Indonesia) EVOS Divine | FFWS South East Asia 2024 Fall | 16 August – 13 October 2024 | Top 8 | South East Asia | 3 | 2022 (1st) | 5th Place (2022 (1st)) |
| (Indonesia) Bigetron Delta | FFWS South East Asia 2024 Fall | 16 August – 13 October 2024 | Top 8 | South East Asia | 1 | —N/a | —N/a |
| (Vietnam) HUA Esports | FFWS South East Asia 2024 Fall | 16 August – 13 October 2024 | Top 8 | South East Asia | 1 | —N/a | —N/a |

== Format ==
- Knockout Stage: 8–17 November 2024 at the Carioca Arena 1, Barra Olympic Park, (Brazil) Rio de Janeiro
  - 18 teams, divided into 3 groups of 6.
  - 2 Weeks:
    - Each week consist of 3 matchdays.
    - Each matchday consist of 6 matches.
  - 36 matches, each group play 12 matches.
  - Top 12 teams advance to Points Rush and Grand Finals.
- Points Rush: 22–23 November 2024 at the Carioca Arena 1, Barra Olympic Park, (Brazil) Rio de Janeiro
  - 12 teams.
  - 12 matches (6 each day).
  - Teams gain Headstart Points for Grand Finals after each day based on their daily standings.
- Grand Final: 24 November 2024 at the Carioca Arena 1, Barra Olympic Park, (Brazil) Rio de Janeiro
  - 12 teams.
  - Teams begin with headstart points from Points Rush.
  - 6 matches.

== Schedule ==
Tournament schedule
| Stage | Day | Date | Teams |
|---|---|---|---|
| Knockout Stage | 1 | 8 November 2024 | Group A vs B |
| Knockout Stage | 2 | 9 November 2024 | Group B vs C |
| Knockout Stage | 3 | 10 November 2024 | Group A vs C |
| Knockout Stage | 4 | 15 November 2024 | Group A vs B |
| Knockout Stage | 5 | 16 November 2024 | Group B vs C |
| Knockout Stage | 6 | 17 November 2024 | Group A vs C |
| Point-Rush Stage | 1 | 22 November 2024 | Top 12 teams |
| Point-Rush Stage | 2 | 23 November 2024 | Top 12 teams |
| Grand Finals | | 24 November 2024 | Top 12 teams |

== Knockout Stage ==
- ^{*} Rezurrection X Esports, the winner from FFWS Pakistan 2024, did not participate due to visa issues. The team was awarded 18th place and the championship continued with 17 teams.

Knockout Stage Group Draw
| Group A | Group B | Group C |
|---|---|---|
| (Pakistan) ~~RZX~~ * (Thailand) BRU (Vietnam) HUA (Mexico) RETA (Thailand) TWIS (Indonesia) RRQ | (Chile) CLG (Indonesia) EVOS (Brazil) SCCP (Brazil) FX. (Indonesia) BTR (Morocco) WK | (Mexico) 6K (Thailand) AAA (Thailand) FLCN (Vietnam) WAG (Brazil) PAIN (Brazil) E1 |

=== Knockout Stage standings ===
| Rank | Team | Total score | Placement | Kills | Booyah | Qualification |
|---|---|---|---|---|---|---|
| 1 | (Thailand) Buriram United Esports | 237 | 114 | 123 | 5 | Advance to the Point-Rush Stage and Grand Final |
| 2 | (Vietnam) WAG | 193 | 83 | 110 | 3 | Advance to the Point-Rush Stage and Grand Final |
| 3 | (Thailand) Twisted Minds | 190 | 83 | 107 | 3 | Advance to the Point-Rush Stage and Grand Final |
| 4 | (Brazil) Fluxo | 152 | 74 | 78 | 1 | Advance to the Point-Rush Stage and Grand Final |
| 5 | (Thailand) Attack All Around | 143 | 61 | 82 | 2 | Advance to the Point-Rush Stage and Grand Final |
| 6 | (Thailand) Team Falcons | 141 | 65 | 76 | 0 | Advance to the Point-Rush Stage and Grand Final |
| 7 | (Brazil) paiN Gaming | 125 | 57 | 68 | 0 | Advance to the Point-Rush Stage and Grand Final |
| 8 | (Indonesia) Bigetron Delta | 110 | 55 | 55 | 0 | Advance to the Point-Rush Stage and Grand Final |
| 9 | (Brazil) E1 Sports | 108 | 58 | 50 | 0 | Advance to the Point-Rush Stage and Grand Final |
| 10 | (Vietnam) HUA Esports | 107 | 53 | 54 | 1 | Advance to the Point-Rush Stage and Grand Final |
| 11 | (Indonesia) RRQ Kazu | 106 | 51 | 55 | 1 | Advance to the Point-Rush Stage and Grand Final |
| 12 | (Brazil) Corinthians | 103 | 50 | 53 | 1 | Advance to the Point-Rush Stage and Grand Final |
| 13 | (Mexico) RETA Esports | 100 | 56 | 44 | 0 | Eliminate from the tournament |
| 14 | (Chile) CLG | 91 | 50 | 41 | 1 | Eliminate from the tournament |
| 15 | (Mexico) Six Karma | 84 | 49 | 35 | 0 | Eliminate from the tournament |
| 16 | (Indonesia) EVOS Divine | 73 | 36 | 37 | 0 | Eliminate from the tournament |
| 17 | (Morocco) WASK | 53 | 31 | 22 | 0 | Eliminate from the tournament |
| 18 | (Pakistan) Rezurrection X Esports | 0 | 0 | 0 | 0 | Eliminate from the tournament |

== Point-Rush Stage ==
Each of the teams also qualifies for the Grand Final.

=== Point-Rush Stage standings ===
| Rank | Team | Total score | Placement | Kills | Booyah | Headstart points |
|---|---|---|---|---|---|---|
| 1 | TBD | | | | | |
| 2 | TBD | | | | | |
| 3 | TBD | | | | | |
| 4 | TBD | | | | | |
| 5 | TBD | | | | | |
| 6 | TBD | | | | | |
| 7 | TBD | | | | | |
| 8 | TBD | | | | | |
| 9 | TBD | | | | | |
| 10 | TBD | | | | | |
| 11 | TBD | | | | | |
| 12 | TBD | | | | | |

== Grand Final ==
Initial Grand Final points (earned in Point-Rush Stage)
| Team | Points | Team | Points | Team | Points |
|---|---|---|---|---|---|
| TBD | | TBD | | TBD | |
| TBD | | TBD | | TBD | |
| TBD | | TBD | | TBD | |
| TBD | | TBD | | TBD | |

=== Grand Final standings ===
| Rank | Team | Total score | Placement | Kills | Booyah |
|---|---|---|---|---|---|
| 1 | (Brazil) Fluxo | 86 | | | 3 |
| 2 | (Indonesia) RRQ Kazu | 83 | | | 1 |
| 3 | (Thailand) Buriram United Esports | 78 | | | 0 |
| 4 | (Brazil) E1 Sports | 74 | | | 0 |
| 5 | (Thailand) Twisted Minds | 71 | | | 1 |
| 6 | (Brazil) paiN Gaming | 68 | | | 1 |
| 7 | (Vietnam) WAG | 65 | | | 0 |
| 8 | (Thailand) Team Falcons | 63 | | | 0 |
| 9 | (Brazil) Corinthians | 60 | | | 0 |
| 10 | (Vietnam) HUA Esports | 41 | | | 0 |
| 11 | (Indonesia) Bigetron Delta | 25 | | | 0 |
| 12 | (Thailand) Attack All Around | 19 | | | 0 |

Finale

== Prize pool and final standings ==
Prize pool of the tournament.

Prize money distribution Total: $ 1,000,000
| Rank | Team | Prize (in USD) |
|---|---|---|
| 1 | (Brazil) Fluxo | $300,000 |
| 2 | (Indonesia) RRQ Kazu | $150,000 |
| 3 | (Thailand) Buriram United Esports | $70,000 |
| 4 | (Brazil) E1 Sports | $60,000 |
| 5 | (Thailand) Twisted Minds | $55,000 |
| 6 | (Brazil) paiN Gaming | $50,000 |
| 7 | (Vietnam) WAG | $45,000 |
| 8 | (Thailand) Team Falcons | $40,000 |
| 9 | (Brazil) Corinthians | $35,000 |
| 10 | (Vietnam) HUA Esports | $30,000 |
| 11 | (Indonesia) Bigetron Delta | $26,000 |
| 12 | (Thailand) Attack All Around | $25,000 |
| 13 | TBD | $15,000 |
| 14 | TBD | $15,000 |
| 15 | TBD | $15,000 |
| 16 | TBD | $15,000 |
| 17 | TBD | $15,000 |
| 18 | (Pakistan) Rezurrection X Esports | $15,000 |
