= 2024 Esports World Cup – Free Fire =

Garena Free Fire tournament at the 2024 Esports World Cup

Garena Free Fire at the 2024 Esports World Cup
Tournament information
- Sport: Garena Free Fire
- Location: Riyadh, Saudi Arabia
- Dates: 10 July 2024–14 July 2024
- Administrator: Esports World Cup Foundation, Garena, ESL
- Venue(s): 1 (in 1 host city)
- Participants: 18 teams
- Purse: $1,000,000
- Website: https://esportsworldcup.com/en/competition/games-and-tournaments/free-fire

Final positions
- Champion: (Saudi Arabia) Team Falcons (1st title)
- 1st runner-up: (Indonesia) EVOS Esports
- 2nd runner-up: (Brazil) Netshoes Miners

Tournament statistics
- Matches played: 30
- MVP: (Thailand) Moshi (Buriram United Esports)

The Multiplayer online battle royale video game Garena Free Fire had a tournament at the 2024 Esports World Cup. It was held in Riyadh, Saudi Arabia; from July 10 to 15, 2024, and eighteen teams took part in this tournament.

== Background ==
In October 2023, Saudi Arabia announced the inaugural Esports World Cup as the successor of Gamers8 (Saudi Esports Federation's previously existing esports festival), set to take place in Riyadh. The event was developed as a part of Saudi Arabia's Vision 2030, a plan led by Crown Prince Mohammed bin Salman aimed at diversifying the country's economy and reducing reliance on oil.

== Calendar ==
●	Days of competition

July 2024	July				
July 2024	Week 2				
July 2024	10	11	12	13	14
Garena Free Fire	●	●	●	●	●

== Qualification ==
Event	Region	Date	Seeds	Qualified Teams
FFWS SEA 2024 Spring	ASEAN	Mar 22 - May 26	Top 8	(Thailand) Team Falcons (Vietnam) P Esports (Thailand) Buriram United Esports (Indonesia) EVOS Esports (Thailand) AG Global (Indonesia) ONIC Olympus (Indonesia) Gaimin Gladiators (Indonesia) RRQ KAZU
FFWS Brazil 2024	Brazil	Apr 20 - Jun 10	Top 3 (Phase 1)	(Brazil) Team Solid (Brazil) Netshoes Miners (Brazil) LOUD
FFWS LATAM 2024	South America	Mar 22 - Jun 1	Top 3	(Mexico) 19esports (Mexico) All Glory Gaming (Mexico) RETA Esports
Snapdragon Pro Series	Global	Apr 13 - 14	Top 2	(Thailand) Twisted Minds (Brazil) FLUXO
FF MEA MSC 2024	Middle East; Africa	Apr 20 - May 11	Champion	(Algeria) ALQADSIAH ESPORT
Pakistan Qualifier	Pakistan	Jun 2	Champion	(Pakistan) Hotshot Esports

== Format ==
- Knockout Stage: 10–12 July 2024
  - 18 teams, divided into 3 groups of 6.
  - 18 matches, each group play 12 matches.
  - Top 12 teams advance to Points Rush and Grand Finals.
- Points Rush: 13 July 2024
  - 12 teams.
  - 6 matches.
  - Teams gain headstart points for Grand Finals based on their final placements.
- Grand Final: 14 July 2024
  - 12 teams.
  - Teams begin with headstart points from Points Rush.
  - 6 matches.

== Schedule ==
Round	Date	Teams
Knockout Stage	10 July 2024	Group A vs B
Knockout Stage	11 July 2024	Group B vs C
Knockout Stage	12 July 2024	Group A vs C
Point-Rush Stage	13 July 2024	Top 12 teams
Grand Finals	14 July 2024	Top 12 teams

== Knockout Stage ==
Knockout Stage Group Draw
Group A	Group B	Group C
(Indonesia) EVOS Esports (Brazil) Netshoes Miners (Thailand) AG Global (Brazil) FLUXO (Indonesia) ONIC Olympus (Mexico) 19esports	(Brazil) LOUD (Thailand) Buriram United Esports (Vietnam) P Esports (Indonesia) RRQ KAZU (Mexico) RETA Esports (Pakistan) Hotshot Esports	(Thailand) Twisted Minds (Algeria) ALQADSIAH ESPORT (Note: The team qualified as SKR, but was signed by ALQADSIAH before the tournament.) (Brazil) Team Solid (Thailand) Team Falcons (Mexico) All Glory Gaming (Indonesia) Gaimin Gladiators (Note: While they qualified as Indostars, the team was bought by Gaimin Gladiators on 30 May 2024.)

=== Knockout Stage Standings ===
Rank	Team	Total Score	Placement	Kills	Booyah	Qualification
1	(Brazil) LOUD	221	88	133	2	Qualified for the Point-Rush Stage and Grand Final
2	(Thailand) Buriram United Esports	213	94	119	3	Qualified for the Point-Rush Stage and Grand Final
3	(Thailand) Team Falcons	188	77	111	2	Qualified for the Point-Rush Stage and Grand Final
4	(Thailand) AG Global	181	81	100	1	Qualified for the Point-Rush Stage and Grand Final
5	(Indonesia) EVOS Esports	161	68	93	1	Qualified for the Point-Rush Stage and Grand Final
6	(Indonesia) RRQ KAZU	158	72	86	3	Qualified for the Point-Rush Stage and Grand Final
7	(Thailand) Twisted Minds	141	67	74	1	Qualified for the Point-Rush Stage and Grand Final
8	(Brazil) Team Solid	135	60	75	0	Qualified for the Point-Rush Stage and Grand Final
9	(Vietnam) P Esports	126	63	63	1	Qualified for the Point-Rush Stage and Grand Final
10	(Brazil) Netshoes Miners	112	47	65	0	Qualified for the Point-Rush Stage and Grand Final
11	(Indonesia) Gaimin Gladiators	103	59	44	2	Qualified for the Point-Rush Stage and Grand Final
12	(Brazil) FLUXO	102	45	57	1	Qualified for the Point-Rush Stage and Grand Final
13	(Mexico) All Glory Gaming	102	54	48	1	Eliminated from the tournament
14	(Mexico) RETA Esports	88	34	54	0	Eliminated from the tournament
15	(Pakistan) Hotshot Esports	80	42	38	0	Eliminated from the tournament
16	(Mexico) 19esports	70	29	41	0	Eliminated from the tournament
17	(Indonesia) ONIC Olympus	62	33	29	0	Eliminated from the tournament
18	(Algeria) ALQADSIAH ESPORT	43	13	30	0	Eliminated from the tournament

== Point-Rush Stage ==
Each of the teams also qualify for the Grand Final.

=== Point-Rush Stage Standings ===
Rank	Team	Total Score	Placement	Kills	Booyah	Headstart Points
1	(Thailand) Buriram United Esports	117	46	71	3	8 Points
2	(Thailand) AG Global	91	40	51	0	6 Points
3	(Indonesia) EVOS Esports	76	32	44	0	5 Points
4	(Brazil) FLUXO	70	26	44	2	4 Points
5	(Indonesia) RRQ KAZU	68	32	36	0	3 Points
6	(Thailand) Twisted Minds	63	21	42	0	2 Points
7	(Thailand) Team Falcons	61	19	42	0	1 Point
8	(Vietnam) P Esports	59	20	39	0	1 Point
9	(Brazil) Netshoes Miners	55	31	24	1	1 Point
10	(Indonesia) Gaimin Gladiators	53	24	29	0	1 Point
11	(Brazil) LOUD	53	30	23	0	0 Points
12	(Brazil) Team Solid	40	21	19	0	0 Points

== Grand Final ==
Both LOUD and Team Solid have 5 points deducted from their Grand Final scores due to attempted illegal team-ups to defeat other teams during the previous rounds

=== Grand Final Standings ===
Rank	Team	Total Score	Placement	Kills	Booyah	Qualification
1	(Thailand) Team Falcons	106	41	65	2	Qualified for the Free Fire World Series – Global Finals 2024
2	(Indonesia) EVOS Esports	99	48	51	1	
3	(Brazil) Netshoes Miners	90	37	53	2	
4	(Thailand) Buriram United Esports	86	45	41	0	
5	(Thailand) AG Global	77	44	33	0	
6	(Brazil) LOUD	62	28	39	0	
7	(Indonesia) RRQ KAZU	61	29	32	0	
8	(Indonesia) Gaimin Gladiators	57	28	29	0	
9	(Brazil) FLUXO	51	29	22	1	
10	(Vietnam) P Esports	51	17	34	0	
11	(Thailand) Twisted Minds	38	17	21	0	
12	(Brazil) Team Solid	18	11	12	0	

== Prize Pool ==
Prize Pool of the Tournament.

Prize money distribution Total: $1,000,000 USD
Rank	Team	Prize (in USD)	Qualification
1	(Thailand) Team Falcons	$300,000	Free Fire World Series – Global Finals 2024
2	(Indonesia) EVOS Esports	$175,000	–
3	(Brazil) Netshoes Miners	$125,000	–
4	(Thailand) Buriram United Esports	$80,000	–
5	(Thailand) AG Global	$60,000	–
6	(Brazil) LOUD	$50,000	–
7	(Indonesia) RRQ KAZU	$40,000	–
8	(Indonesia) Gaimin Gladiators	$35,000	–
9	(Brazil) FLUXO	$30,000	–
10	(Vietnam) P Esports	$25,000	–
11	(Thailand) Twisted Minds	$20,000	–
12	(Brazil) Team Solid	$15,000	–
13	(Mexico) All Glory Gaming	$10,000	–
14	(Mexico) RETA Esports	$9,000	–
15	(Pakistan) Hotshot Esports	$8,000	–
16	(Mexico) 19esports	$7,000	–
17	(Indonesia) ONIC Olympus	$6,000	–
18	(Algeria) ALQADSIAH ESPORT	$5,000	–
