= Free Fire World Series =

Esports tournament

- Free Fire World Series Logo
- Game: Free Fire
- Founded: 2019
- Founder: Garena
- No. of teams: 24 (2026)
- Region: Global
- Most recent champion: (Thailand) Buriram United Esports (1st title)
- Most titles: (Thailand) joena (3)
- Streaming partner: www.youtube.com/@freefireesportsofficial
- Website: ffesports.com

Free Fire World Series (FFWS) is the annual professional Free Fire world championship tournament hosted by Garena. Teams compete for a total prize pool of US$2 million. The 2021 edition of the event became world's most watched esports event by peak live viewer count at the time before being overtaken by Mobile Legends: Bang Bang's M7 World Championship.

== Overview ==
The Free Fire World Series uses the Squad Battle Royale mode available in the video game Free Fire. 48 players (12 teams each one having four players) airdrop onto an island without any weapons or armor. Once on the ground, players must search for weapons, armor, and med kits. Players can knock down players using the weapons they collected. The last team to survive wins the game. Players get points based on the number of eliminations and final ranking of their team.

== History ==
=== Inaugural edition (2019) ===
Free Fire World Series 2019 was held in November 2019 at Barra Olympic Park, Rio de Janeiro, and featured a prize pool of $400,000. 12 teams from Brazil, Thailand, Indonesia, Vietnam, the Middle East, India, Latin America, North America, and Eurasia participated in the championship. It was won by the Brazilian representatives the Corinthians. The event had a peak live viewers count of 1.9 million.

=== 2020 Cancellation ===
Due to the COVID-19 pandemic, the FFWS for the 2020 season - alongside the 2020 Free Fire World Cup 2020 (FFWC) that was supposed to be held in Jakarta during the Summer, were both cancelled. Free Fire World Series 2020 had to be replaced with Free Fire Continental Series 2020 which was held to be on April 19. Free Fire Continental Series was held as 3 separate events for Asia, EMEA and Americas. The event was streamed live on YouTube and had 1.5 million peak live viewers. There was a prize pool of $300,000. In each region a total of 18 teams fought for a prize pool of $300,000. The Asian region winner was EXP Esports, the EMEA region winner was Sbornaya Chr, and the American region winner was Team Liquid.

=== 2021 ===
In 2021, Garena announced the Free Fire World Series with a prize pool of $2 million. The grand finale was held in May 2021 at Marina Bay Sands, Singapore. A total of 18 teams competes for the FFWS trophy, which was won by Phoenix Force (EVOS Esports TH). The Free Fire World Series 2021 became the most watched esports event at the time with over 5.4 million peak live viewers, surpassing the 2021 League of Legends World Championship, which had 4 million peak viewers.

The second FFWS event was cancelled due to COVID-19 pandemic scheduled to held in November 2021.

=== 2022 ===
In 2022, two FFWS editions were held.

The first FFWS 2022 grand finale was held in May 2022 at the Resort World Sentosa convention centre. The event featured 18 teams representing different regions, competing for a prize pool of $2 million. The championship was won by Attack All Around. The event had a maximum of 1.4 million concurrent viewers during the grand finale, which was a decrease of 4 million viewers from the 2021 viewership, partially due to the ban of Free Fire in India and Bangladesh.

The second FFWS event of 2022 was held in Bangkok, Thailand. The event featured 17 teams from around the world. Players compete for a prize pool of $2 million. The championship was won by EVOS Phoenix for the second time in this competition.

=== 2023 ===
The 2023 Free Fire World Series grand finale took place in Bangkok, Thailand, hosting a total of 18 teams and a prize pool of $1 million. The participating teams comprised three from Brazil, Indonesia, Thailand, and Vietnam each, while Argentina, Mexico, Colombia, Pakistan, Morocco, and Malaysia were represented by one team each. Team Magic Squad from Brazil won the championship. The event had a significantly low amount of viewership compared to previous FFWS.

=== 2024 ===
The Free Fire World Series – Global Finals 2024 (FFWS), was held in November 2024 at Carioca Arena 1, Barra Olympic Park, Rio de Janeiro, Brazil, with a total of 18 teams and a prize pool of $1 million.. The qualification path of teams for this tournament were 2024 Esports World Cup – Free Fire, FFWS South East Asia 2024 Fall, FFWS Brazil 2024, FFWS LATAM 2024, FFWS Middle East and Africa 2024.

=== 2025 ===
The Free Fire World Series - Global Finals 2025 (FFWS), was held in November 2025 at Indonesia Arena, Jakarta, Indonesia. A total of 18 teams participated for prize pool $1 million, and the top 12 teams advanced to the grand finals.

The overall event featured 618,778 participants, setting a new Guinness World Record for the Largest Mobile Team-Based Esports Tournament.

=== 2026 ===
Garena announced that the FFWS Global Finals 2026 will once again held in Bangkok, Thailand with the addition of 24 teams participating in the finals that will held later in the year. Free Fire World Series league also expanded to the United States to offer pathways to qualify for both EWC and FFWS Global Finals. Garena also introducing standalone Clash Squad tournament that would be reveal closer to the launch.

== Hosts ==
=== Summary by country ===
Country	Times hosted	Editions
Thailand	3	2022, 2023, 2026
Singapore	2	2021, 2022
Brazil	2	2019, 2024
Indonesia	1	2025

== Results ==
Ed.	Year	Host country	Venue & City	Champion & Runner up				3rd Place	MVP of the Tournament	Number of Teams	Ref
Ed.	Year	Host country	Venue & City	Champion	Score		Runner-up	3rd Place	MVP of the Tournament	Number of Teams	Ref
1	2019	Brazil	Barra Olympic Park, Rio de Janeiro	(Brazil) Corinthians	132	98	(Russia) Sbornaya ChR	(Thailand) ILLUMINATE Slow TwoK	(Brazil) Nobru (Corinthians)	12	
–	~~2020~~	–		(Not held because of COVID-19 pandemic.) & replaced with Free Fire Continental Series 2020.				–			
2	2021 (1st)	Singapore	Marina Bay Sands, Downtown Core	(Thailand) Phoenix Force	113	77	(Brazil) LOUD	(Russia) Silence	(Thailand) The Cruz (Phoenix Force)	18	
–	~~2021 (2nd)~~	–		(Not held because of COVID-19 pandemic.)				–			
3	2022 (1st)	Singapore	Resort World Sentosa, Sentosa	(Thailand) Attack All Around	92	91	(Thailand) EVOS Phoenix	(Portugal) Vasto Mundo	(Thailand) JLX (Attack All Around)	18	
4	2022 (2nd)	Thailand	Bangkok	(Thailand) EVOS Phoenix	117	114	(Brazil) Vivo Keyd Stats	(Thailand) Nigma Galaxy	(Thailand) Moshi (EVOS Phoenix)	17	
5	2023	Thailand	Bangkok	(Brazil) Magic Squad	112	95	(Thailand) Buriram United Esports	(Thailand) CGGG	(Thailand) DEW (EXP Esports)	18	
6	2024	Brazil	Carioca Arena 1, Barra Olympic Park, Rio de Janeiro	(Brazil) Fluxo	86	83	(Indonesia) RRQ	(Thailand) Buriram United Esports	(Brazil) E1	18	
7	2025	Indonesia	Indonesia Arena, Jakarta	(Thailand) Buriram United Esports	103	102	(Brazil) Fluxo	(Thailand) All Gamers Global	(Thailand) Wassana (Buriram United Esports)	18	
8	2026	Thailand	Bangkok							24	

=== Teams reaching the top three ===
Teams reaching the top three
Team	Champions	Runners-up	Third place	Top 3 (total)
(Thailand) Buriram United Esports	1 (2025)	1 (2023)	1 (2024)	3
(Thailand) EVOS Phoenix *	2 (2021 (1st), 2022 (2nd))	1 (2022 (1st))		3
(Brazil) Fluxo	1 (2024)	1 (2025 (1st))		2
(Brazil) Magic Squad	1 (2023)			1
(Thailand) Attack All Around	1 (2022 (1st))			1
(Brazil) Corinthians	1 (2019)			1
(Indonesia) RRQ		1 (2024)		1
(Brazil) Vivo Keyd Stats		1 (2022 (2nd))		1
(Brazil) LOUD		1 (2021 (1st))		1
(Russia) Sbornaya ChR		1 (2019)		1
(Thailand) CGGG			1 (2023)	1
(Thailand) Nigma Galaxy			1 (2022 (2nd))	1
(Portugal) Vasto Mundo			1 (2022 (1st))	1
(Russia) Silence			1 (2021 (1st))	1
(Thailand) ILLUMINATE Slow TwoK			1 (2019)	1

^{*} includes results representing Phoenix Force.

=== Best performances by countries ===
Teams from only four countries have reached top three.

Best performances by countries
Team	Champions	Runners-up	Third place	Top 3 (total)
Thailand	4 (2021 (1st), 2022 (1st), 2022 (2nd), 2025)	3 (2022 (1st), 2023, 2024)	4 (2019, 2022 (2nd), 2023, 2024)	11
Brazil	3 (2019, 2023, 2024)	3 (2021 (1st), 2022, 2025)		6
Russia		1 (2019)	1 (2021 (1st))	2
Indonesia		1 (2024)		1
Portugal			1 (2022 (1st))	1

== See also ==
- 2024 Esports World Cup – Free Fire
- Free Fire Continental Series 2020
