= 2027 in video games =

In the video game industry, 2027 is expected to feature new hardware and game releases, the discontinuation of several games and services, and numerous film and television adaptations of video game franchises. Nintendo is scheduled to end production of all Nintendo Switch hardware in Europe in February, while Reality Labs plans to release the Meta VR Glasses in the second quarter of the year.

== Major events ==
Date	Event	Ref.
February	Nintendo will end production of all Nintendo Switch hardware in Europe, including the Nintendo Switch Lite and OLED Model.	

== Hardware releases ==
Date	Console	Manufacturer	Ref.
Q2	Meta VR Glasses	Reality Labs	

== Discontinued games ==
Games highlighted in bold indicate that the full game will be shut down.

Title	Platform(s)	Genre(s)	Developer(s)	Publisher(s)	Shutdown date	Ref.
**New World**	WIN, PS5, XBX/S	MMORPG	Amazon Games Orange County	Amazon Games	January 31, 2027	
**The Kingdom of the Winds: Yeon**	WIN, iOS, DROID	MMORPG	Supercat	Nexon	February 12, 2027	
**Idoly Pride**	iOS, DROID	Rhythm	QualiArts		March 1, 2027	
**PGA Tour 2K23**	WIN, PS4, PS5, XBO, XBX/S	Sports	HB Studios	2K	March 12, 2027	
**Pokemon Unite**	NS, DROID, iOS	MOBA	TiMi Studio Group	CN: Tencent Games; WW: The Pokémon Company	March 23, 2027	
**Lego 2K Drive**	WIN, NS, PS4, PS5, XBO, XBX/S	Racing	Visual Concepts	2K	May 31, 2027	
Kingdom Hearts Integrum Masterpiece	NS	Action RPG	Square Enix		June 9, 2027	
**NBA 2K26**	WIN, NS, NS2, PS4, PS5, XBO, XBX/S	Sports	Visual Concepts	2K	December 31, 2027	
**TopSpin 2K25**	WIN, PS4, PS5, XBO, XBX/S	Sports	Hangar 13	2K	December 31, 2027	

== Video game-based film and television releases ==
Title	Release / premiere date	Type	Distributor	Franchise	Original game publisher	Ref.
Witch on the Holy Night (WW)	January 29, 2027	Anime film	Crunchyroll, Sony Pictures Entertainment	Witch on the Holy Night	Type-Moon	
Sekiro: No Defeat (WW)	January 2027	Anime television series	Crunchyroll	Sekiro: Shadows Die Twice	JP: FromSoftware; WW: Activision	
Free Fire Daybreak	Q1/Q2 2027	Anime television series	Kadokawa Corporation	Free Fire	Garena	
Sonic the Hedgehog 4	March 19, 2027	Live-action feature film	Paramount Pictures	Sonic the Hedgehog	Sega	
The Legend of Zelda	April 30, 2027	Live-action feature film	Sony Pictures Releasing	The Legend of Zelda	Nintendo	
A Minecraft Movie Squared	July 23, 2027	Live-action feature film	Warner Bros. Pictures	Minecraft	Mojang Studios	
Death Stranding Isolations	2027	Anime television series	Disney+	Death Stranding	Sony Interactive Entertainment	
Decapolice	2027	Anime television series	TBA	Decapolice	Level-5	
Horizon Zero Dawn	2027	Live-action feature film	Sony Pictures Releasing	Horizon	Sony Interactive Entertainment	
Pokémon Tales: The Misadventures of Sirfetch'd & Pichu	2027	Stop-motion animated series	Disney+	Pokémon	JP: The Pokémon Company; WW: Nintendo	
Pokémon: Wild Card	2027	Anime feature film	TBA	Pokémon	JP: The Pokémon Company; WW: Nintendo	
