= Free Fire Continental Series 2020 =

Esports tournament

Tournament information
- Game: Free Fire
- Location: Online
- Dates: 21–29 November 2024
- Administrator: Garena
- Venue: 3 Tournaments (Asia, Americas, EMEA)
- Participants: Total 57 teams (19 from Asia, 20 from Americas, 18 from EMEA)
- Website: ffesports.com

The Free Fire Continental Series 2020 (FFCS) was a professional Free Fire world championship tournament hosted by Garena.

== Details ==
Due to the COVID-19 pandemic, the FFWS for the 2020 season - alongside the 2020 Free Fire World Cup (FFWC) that was supposed to be held in Jakarta during the Summer, were both cancelled. Free Fire World Series 2020 had to be replaced with Free Fire Continental Series 2020 which was held to be on April 19. Free Fire Continental Series was held as 3 separate events for Asia, EMEA and Americas. The event was streamed live on YouTube and had 1.5 million peak live viewers. There was a prize pool of $300,000. In each region a total of 18 teams fought for a prize pool of $300,000. The Asian region winner was EXP Esports, the EMEA region winner was Sbornaya Chr, and the American region winner was Team Liquid.

== Results ==
Tournament	Mode of Event	Champion & Runner up				3rd Place	MVP of the Tournament	Number of Teams	Ref
Tournament	Mode of Event	Champion	Score		Runner-up	3rd Place	MVP of the Tournament	Number of Teams	Ref
2020 Asia	Online	EXP Esports	161	160	King of Gamers club	RRQ Hades		19	
2020 EMEA	Online	Sbornaya ChR	158	124	Silence	Stay Away		20	
2020 Americas	Online	Team Liquid	151	151	Santos eSports	SS Esports		18	
