= Free Fire World Series 2023 =

Esports tournament

Tournament information
- Game: Free Fire
- Location: Thailand
- Dates: 10–26 November 2023
- Administrator: Garena
- Venue: Bangkok
- Participants: 18 teams
- Website: ffesports.com

Final positions
- Champion: (Brazil) Magic Squad
- 1st runner-up: (Thailand) Buriram United x EVOS
- 2nd runner-up: (Thailand) CGGG

Tournament statistics
- Matches played: 54
- MVP: (Thailand) DEW (EXP Esports)

The Free Fire World Series 2023 (FFWS) was the fifth edition of Free Fire World Series, the annual international Garena Free Fire championship contested by the best teams across the world hosted by Garena. The tournament took place in November 2023. It was hosted in Bangkok, Thailand. This was the second time when Thailand hosted the tournament, first hosted in November 2022. EVOS Phoenix from Thailand were the defending champions for the tournament.

== Overview ==
The Free Fire World Series uses the Squad Battle Royale mode available in the video game Free Fire. 48 players (12 teams each one having four players) airdrop onto an island without any weapons or armor. Once on the ground, players must search for weapons, armor, and med kits. Players can knock down players using the weapons they collected. The last team to survive wins the game. Players get points based on the number of eliminations and final ranking of their team.

== Qualification ==
Team	Name	Date	Seeds	Region	Total times qualified	Last time qualified	Previous best performance
(Brazil) Magic Squad	Liga Brasileira de Free Fire	15 April – 5 August 2023	Group Stage Champions	Brazil	2	2022 (2nd)	4th Place (2022 (2nd))
(Brazil) LOUD	Liga Brasileira de Free Fire	15 April – 5 August 2023	Finals Top 2	Brazil	3	2022 (1st)	2nd Place (2021 (1st))
(Brazil) MIBR	Liga Brasileira de Free Fire	15 April – 5 August 2023	Finals Top 2	Brazil	1	—N/a	—N/a
(Morocco) WASK	MEA League	28 July – 25 August 2023	Champions	Middle East; Africa	2	2022 (1st)	12th Place (2022 (1st))
(Pakistan) Hotshot Esports	Pakistan Qualifier	9 September 2023	Champions	Pakistan	2	2022 (2nd)	14th Place (2022 (1st))
(Argentina) Furious Gaming	League Latinoamerica	4 February – 23 September 2023	Top 3	South America	1	—N/a	—N/a
(Mexico) All Glory Gaming	League Latinoamerica	4 February – 23 September 2023	Top 3	South America	1	—N/a	—N/a
(Colombia) Osaka	League Latinoamerica	4 February – 23 September 2023	Top 3	South America	1	—N/a	—N/a
(Indonesia) POCO Star	Master League	1 September – 8 October 2023	League Champions	Indonesia	1	—N/a	—N/a
(Indonesia) Thorrad	Master League	1 September – 8 October 2023	Finals Top 2	Indonesia	2	2021 (1st)	11th Place (2021 (1st))
(Indonesia) RRQ Kazu	Master League	1 September – 8 October 2023	Finals Top 2	Indonesia	2	2022 (2nd)	7th Place (2022 (2nd))
(Malaysia) Expand	MCPS Majors	16 September – 8 October 2023	Champions	Malaysia; Philippines; Singapore; Sri Lanka	2	2022 (2nd)	13th Place (2022 (2nd))
(Thailand) Buriram United x EVOS	Pro League Thailand	17 August – 15 October 2023	Top 3	Thailand	1	—N/a	—N/a
(Thailand) EXP Esports	Pro League Thailand	17 August – 15 October 2023	Top 3	Thailand	1	—N/a	—N/a
(Thailand) CGGG	Pro League Thailand	17 August – 15 October 2023	Top 3	Thailand	1	—N/a	—N/a
(Vietnam) P Esports	Vietnam League	15 September – 15 October 2023	Top 3	Vietnam	1	—N/a	—N/a
(Vietnam) GOW	Vietnam League	15 September – 15 October 2023	Top 3	Vietnam	1	—N/a	—N/a
(Vietnam) WAG	Vietnam League	15 September – 15 October 2023	Top 3	Vietnam	1	—N/a	—N/a

== Format ==
- Knockout Stage: 11–19 November 2024
  - 18 teams, divided into 3 groups of 6.
  - 36 matches, each group play 12 matches.
  - Top 12 teams advance to Points Rush and Grand Finals.
- Points Rush: 24–25 November 2024
  - 12 teams.
  - 12 matches.
  - Teams gain headstart points for Grand Final based on their final placements.
- Grand Final: 26 November 2024
  - 12 teams.
  - Teams begin with headstart points from Points Rush.
  - 6 matches.

== Schedule ==
Tournament Schedule
Stage	Day	Date	Teams
Knockout Stage	1	10 November 2024	Group A vs B
Knockout Stage	2	11 November 2024	Group B vs C
Knockout Stage	3	12 November 2024	Group A vs C
Knockout Stage	4	17 November 2024	Group A vs B
Knockout Stage	5	18 November 2024	Group B vs C
Knockout Stage	6	19 November 2024	Group A vs C
Point-Rush Stage	1	24 November 2024	Top 12 teams
Point-Rush Stage	2	25 November 2024	Top 12 teams
Grand Finals		26 November 2024	Top 12 teams

== Knockout Stage ==
Knockout Stage Group Draw
Group A	Group B	Group C
Thorrad; Buriram United x EVOS; MIBR; All Glory Gaming; Magic Squad; Hotshot Esports	Furious Gaming; WASK; RRQ Kazu; GOW; CGGG; WAG	LOUD; P Esports; Expand; EXP Esports; Osaka; POCO Star

=== Standings ===
Rank	Team	Total Score	Placement	Kills	Booyah	Qualification
1	EXP Esports	413				Advanced to the Point-Rush Stage and Grand Final
2	Buriram United x EVOS	376				Advanced to the Point-Rush Stage and Grand Final
3	CGGG	376				Advanced to the Point-Rush Stage and Grand Final
4	Magic Squad	303				Advanced to the Point-Rush Stage and Grand Final
5	RRQ Kazu	291				Advanced to the Point-Rush Stage and Grand Final
6	LOUD	289				Advanced to the Point-Rush Stage and Grand Final
7	POCO Star	283				Advanced to the Point-Rush Stage and Grand Final
8	WAG	244				Advanced to the Point-Rush Stage and Grand Final
9	Thorrad	221				Advanced to the Point-Rush Stage and Grand Final
10	Expand	206				Advanced to the Point-Rush Stage and Grand Final
11	P Esports	182				Advanced to the Point-Rush Stage and Grand Final
12	GOW	177				Advanced to the Point-Rush Stage and Grand Final
13	Hotshot Esports	171				Eliminated from the tournament
14	MIBR	160				Eliminated from the tournament
15	All Glory Gaming	153				Eliminated from the tournament
16	Osaka	144				Eliminated from the tournament
17	Furious Gaming	141				Eliminated from the tournament
18	WASK	104				Eliminated from the tournament

== Point-Rush Stage ==
=== Day 1 Standings ===
Rank	Team	Total Score	Placement	Kills	Booyah	Headstart Points
1	CGGG	84		44		8
2	Magic Squad	82		39		6
3	LOUD	78		36		5
4	RRQ Kazu	73		50		4
5	Buriram United x EVOS	66		42		3
6	Expand	59		24		2
7	WAG	57		25		1
8	EXP Esports	55		27		1
9	GOW	53		28		1
10	Thorrad	40		23		1
11	P Esports	36		22		0
12	POCO Star	36		17		0

=== Day 2 Standings ===
Rank	Team	Total Score	Placement	Kills	Booyah	Headstart Points
1	Buriram United x EVOS	82		40		8
2	Magic Squad	78		35		6
3	CGGG	76		46		5
4	RRQ Kazu	70		37		4
5	EXP Esports	69		38		3
6	Thorrad	68		39		2
7	WAG	65		34		1
8	Expand	62		30		1
9	P Esports	56		35		1
10	POCO Star	39		22		1
11	LOUD	32		14		0
12	GOW	27		12		0

== Grand Final ==
Initial Grand Final Points (earned in Point-Rush Stage)
Team	Points	Team	Points	Team	Points
CGGG	13	LOUD	5	WAG	2
Magic Squad	12	EXP Esports	4	POCO Star	1
Buriram United x EVOS	11	Thorrad	3	P Esports	1
RRQ Kazu	8	Expand	3	GOW	1

=== Standings ===
Rank	Team	Total Score	Placement	Kills	Booyah
1	Magic Squad	112		45	
2	Buriram United x EVOS	95		37	
3	CGGG	89		44	
4	RRQ Kazu	72		38	
5	WAG	70		27	
6	EXP Esports	68		36	
7	LOUD	66		31	
8	POCO Star	64		28	
9	Thorrad	44		28	
10	Expand	28		9	
11	GOW	25		9	
12	P Esports	14		9	

== Prize Pool ==
Prize Pool of the Tournament.

Prize money distribution Total: $1,000,000
Rank	Team	Prize (in USD)
1	(Brazil) Magic Squad	
2	(Thailand) Buriram United x EVOS	
3	(Thailand) CGGG	
4		
5		
6		
7		
8		
9		
10		
11		
12		
13		
14		
15		
16		
17		
18		
