= Onic Esports =

Professional esports organization based in Indonesia

ONIC Esports
- Nickname: King of Sky
- Short name: ONIC
- Divisions: Active (10): Mobile Legends: Bang Bang (2018–present); Free Fire (2019–present) eFootball (2024–present); Honor of Kings (2024–present); Pokémon Unite (2024–2027); Tekken 8 (2024–present); Fatal Fury: City of the Wolves (2025–present); Street Fighter 6 (2025–present); Delta Force (2025–present); Trackmania (2026–present) Past (9): Arena of Valor (2018); Apex Legends (2022–2025); Call of Duty: Warzone (2025); Dota 2 (2018); PUBG Mobile (2018–2022); Call of Duty: Mobile (2020); Teamfight Tactics (2025–2026); Valorant (2020–2022); Wild Rift (2021)
- Founded: 26 July 2018; 8 years ago
- Based in: Jakarta, Indonesia
- Location: Southeast Asia
- Colors: Yellow Black
- Manager: Amanda Dwi Septiani
- Mascot: Hedgehog
- Official fan club: SONIC Republic
- Partners: Biznet; Dailybox; INFINIX
- Website: onic.gg

Onic Esports (stylized as ONIC Esports) is a Southeast Asian esports team founded in Indonesia by Justin Widjaja in 2018.

They participate in competitive esports division leagues in Mobile Legends: Bang Bang, Free Fire, Pokémon Unite, and Honor of Kings. Initially, the team started with a division in Mobile Legends: Bang Bang, joining MPL Indonesia during Season 2.

== Mobile Legends: Bang Bang ==
=== History ===
ONIC Esports has two main teams in Mobile Legends: Bang Bang, one competing in MPL Indonesia and the other in MPL Philippines. The Indonesian team has been active in MPL Indonesia since Season 2, while the Philippine team entered MPL Philippines in Season 4.

The Indonesian team has a sister team, ONIC Prodigy, competing in MDL Indonesia as their official second squad. The Philippine team has a sister team, ONIC Arsenals, which is currently collaborating with Nine Lives for MDL Philippines.

As of the start of the 2025 season, ONIC Esports has won every premier tournament organized by Moonton, making it one of the first organizations to achieve this feat. Their titles include seven MPL Indonesia and one MPL Philippines championships, two MPL Invitationals (MPLI 2021 and MPLI 2022 with ONIC Indonesia), two MSC titles (MSC 2019 and MSC 2023 with ONIC Indonesia), and one M World Championship title (M6 with ONIC Philippines).

==== Partnership with Fnatic ====
On 20 May 2024, ONIC Philippines partnered with the London-based organization Fnatic ahead of the MPL Philippines playoffs. Subsequently, ONIC Indonesia announced their own partnership with Fnatic through an Instagram post that signified the ONIC porcupine logo embedded with the Fnatic logo. This signifies Fnatic's entry in the MLBB professional scene alongside Team Liquid, who acquired STUN.GG, owners of AURA Fire and ECHO Philippines, the latter being renamed to Liquid ECHO. Their partnership ended on 4 January 2025.In 2026 MSC,They finally revenged to Aurora Turkey with 3:2 in knockout stage.

=== Tournament history ===
Updated as of MLBB 2026 Season

==== Mobile Legends: Bang Bang Professional League ====
Mobile Legends: Bang Bang Professional League results
ONIC ID
Year		MPL Indonesia								Moonton international competitions			ESL competitions	
Year		P	W	L	Match W-L	W-L%	Match W-L%	Seed	Playoffs	MLBB Mid-Season Cup	MPL Invitational	MLBB World Championship	APAC/SEA Challenge Finals	Mobile Masters
2018	Season 2	9	8	1	17-4	.889	.810	1st	3rd place 1-2; EVOS Legends	Did not qualify	Not held	Not held	Not held	Not held
2019	Season 3	11	11	0	22-4	1.000	.846	1st	1st place 3-0; Louvre Esports	1st place 3-0; Louvre Esports	Not held	Did not qualify	Not held	Not held
2019	Season 4	14	6	8	14-16	.429	.467	5th	4th place 0-2; Alter Ego	1st place 3-0; Louvre Esports	Not held	Did not qualify	Not held	Not held
2020	Season 5	14	6	8	17-19	.429	.472	5th	3rd place 0-2; EVOS Legends	Cancelled due to the COVID–19 pandemic	5th-6th place 1-2; EVOS Legends	Did not qualify	Not held	Not held
2020	Season 6	14	10	4	21-12	.714	.636	3rd	4th place 1-2; Alter Ego	Cancelled due to the COVID–19 pandemic	13th-20th place 1-2; ONIC Philippines	Did not qualify	Not held	Not held
2021	Season 7	14	11	3	22-10	.786	.688	1st	4th place 0-2; Aerowolf	Did not qualify	1st place 3-1; Blacklist Int.	9th-12th place 1-2; Blacklist Int.	Not held	Not held
2021	Season 8	14	11	3	24-11	.786	.686	1st	1st place 4-3; RRQ Hoshi	Did not qualify	1st place 3-1; Blacklist Int.	9th-12th place 1-2; Blacklist Int.	Not held	Not held
2022	Season 9	14	11	3	22-8	.786	.733	2nd	2nd place 1-4; RRQ Hoshi	9th-12th place Group stage 0-1-1	1st place 3-2; Geek Fam ID	4th place 0-3; RRQ Hoshi	Not held	Not held
2022	Season 10	14	11	3	25-13	.786	.658	1st	1st place 4-1; RRQ Hoshi	9th-12th place Group stage 0-1-1	1st place 3-2; Geek Fam ID	4th place 0-3; RRQ Hoshi	Not held	Not held
2023	Season 11	14	13	1	27-8	.929	.771	1st	1st place 4-0; EVOS Legends	1st place 4-2; Blacklist Int.	Withdrew	2nd place 3-4; AP Bren	1st place 4-0; Bigetron Alpha	Not held
2023	Season 12	16	13	3	27-9	.813	.750	1st	1st place 4-2; Geek Fam ID	1st place 4-2; Blacklist Int.	Withdrew	2nd place 3-4; AP Bren	1st place 4-0; Bigetron Alpha	Not held
2024	Season 13	16	11	5	25-16	.688	.610	2nd	1st place 4-2; EVOS Glory	9th-12th place Group Stage; 1–1–1	Defunct	Did not qualify	4th place 1-2; Falcons AP Bren	Not held
2024	Season 14	16	10	6	21-17	.625	.553	4th	5th-6th place 2-3; Geek Fam	9th-12th place Group Stage; 1–1–1	Defunct	Did not qualify	4th place 1-2; Falcons AP Bren	Not held
2025	Season 15	16	10	6	24-17	.625	.585	3rd	1st place 4-3; RRQ Hoshi	4th place 2-3; ONIC Philippines	Defunct	7th-8th place 1-3; Team Liquid PH	2nd place 0-4; ONIC Philippines	5th-6th place 1-3; Team Liquid ID
2025	Season 16	16	14	2	29-7	.875	.806	1st	1st place 4-1; Alter Ego	4th place 2-3; ONIC Philippines	Defunct	7th-8th place 1-3; Team Liquid PH	2nd place 0-4; ONIC Philippines	5th-6th place 1-3; Team Liquid ID
2026	Season 17	16	13	3	29-8	.813	.784	1st	2nd place 1-4; Bigetron by Vitality	3rd place 3-0; Team Falcons PH	Defunct	Did not qualify	Not held	
2026	Season 18	16	7	9	19-21	.438	.475	6th	5th-6th place 1-3; Alter Ego	3rd place 3-0; Team Falcons PH	Defunct	Did not qualify	Not held	
All-time stats		228	166	62	361-183	.728	.664		8 MPL title	2 MSC titles	2 MPLI titles	0 Worlds titles	1 Finals titles	0 Masters titles
ONIC PH
Year		MPL Philippines								Moonton international competitions			ESL competitions	
Year		P	W	L	Match W-L	W-L%	Match W-L%	Seed	Playoffs	MLBB Mid-Season Cup	MPL Invitational	MLBB World Championship	APAC/SEA Challenge Finals	Mobile Masters
2019	Season 4	9	8	1	16-7	.889	.696	1st	2nd place 2–3; SunSparks	Did not qualify	Not held	9th–12th place 1–2; Group Stage	Not held	Not held
2020	Season 5	9	7	2	16-5	.778	.762	3rd	2nd place 1–3; SunSparks	Cancelled due to the COVID–19 Pandemic	Did not qualify	Did not qualify	Not held	Not held
2020	Season 6	13	9	4	19-12	.692	.613	3rd Group B	4th place 2–3; Execration	Cancelled due to the COVID–19 Pandemic	9th-12th place 1–2; AURA PH	Did not qualify	Not held	Not held
2021	Season 7	13	7	6	15-16	.538	.484	4th Group A	7th-8th place 2–3; Execration	Did not qualify	9th-12th place 0–2; RRQ Hoshi	2nd place 0–4; Blacklist International	Not held	Not held
2021	Season 8	14	9	5	21-13	.643	.618	2nd	2nd place 1–4; Blacklist International	Did not qualify	9th-12th place 0–2; RRQ Hoshi	2nd place 0–4; Blacklist International	Not held	Not held
2022	Season 9	14	8	6	18-19	.571	.486	5th	4th place 0–3; Smart Omega	Did not qualify	13th-20th place 0–2; AURA Fire	Did not qualify	Not held	Not held
2022	Season 10	14	7	7	18-17	.500	.514	6th	5th-6th place 0–3; RSG Philippines	Did not qualify	13th-20th place 0–2; AURA Fire	Did not qualify	Not held	Not held
2023	Season 11	14	6	8	16-19	.429	.457	5th	5th-6th place 0–3; RSG Philippines	Did not qualify	Was not invited	Did not qualify	Eliminated in Open Finals	Not held
2023	Season 12	14	7	7	16-16	.500	.500	5th	5th-6th place 2–3; Blacklist International	Did not qualify	Was not invited	Did not qualify	Eliminated in Open Finals	Not held
2024	Season 13	14	9	5	19-10	.643	.655	4th	5th place 1–3; Blacklist International	Did not qualify	Defunct	1st place 1–4; Team Liquid ID	Eliminated in Open Finals	Not held
2024	Season 14	14	13	1	27-7	.929	.794	1st	1st place 4–3; Aurora Gaming	Did not qualify	Defunct	1st place 1–4; Team Liquid ID	Eliminated in Open Finals	Not held
2025	Season 15	14	11	3	24-10	.786	.706	3rd	2nd place 3-4; Team Liquid PH	3rd place 3-2; ONIC ID	Defunct	Did not qualify	1st place 4-0; ONIC ID	1st place 4-1; RRQ Hoshi
2025	Season 16	14	9	5	22-13	.643	.629	2nd	4th place 2-3; TNC Pro Team	3rd place 3-2; ONIC ID	Defunct	Did not qualify	1st place 4-0; ONIC ID	1st place 4-1; RRQ Hoshi
2026	Season 17	14	9	5	20-13	.643	.606	3rd	3th place 2-4; Team Falcons PH	Did not qualify	Defunct	Did not qualify	Not held	
2026	Season 18	14	9	5	21-14	.643	.600	3rd	4th place 0-3; Team Liquid PH	Did not qualify	Defunct	Did not qualify	Not held	
All-time stats		212	139	73	312-201	.656	.608	-	1 MPL title	0 MSC titles	0 MPLI titles	1 Worlds titles	1 Finals titles	1 Masters titles

==== Mobile Legends: Bang Bang Development League ====
Mobile Legends: Bang Bang Development League
ONIC Prodigy (S1-S11) / ONIC Prime (S12-Present)
Year		MDL Indonesia										ESL competitions
Year		Stage	P	W	D	L	Match W-L	W-L%	Match W-L%	Seed	Playoffs	APAC/SEA Challenge Finals
2020	Season 1	Group	11	6	-	5	15-12	.545	.556	5th	5th-8th place 0–2; Siren Clan	Not held
2020	Season 2	Group	10	8	-	2	17-5	.800	.773	2nd	3rd-4th place 0–2; Siren Clan	Not held
2021	Season 3	Group	13	8	-	5	18-15	.615	.545	7th	7th-8th place 1–2; Victim Esports	Not held
2021	Season 4	Group	13	4	-	9	13-21	.308	.382	13th	Failed to qualify	Not held
2022	Season 5	Group	13	5	-	8	13-19	.385	.406	11th	Failed to qualify	Not held
2022	Season 6	Group	13	5	-	8	13-18	.385	.419	10th	9-10th place 0–2; Bigetron Beta	Not held
2023	Season 7	Group	15	10	-	5	22-14	.667	.611	4th	3rd-4th place 2–3; EVOS Icon	Eliminated in Indonesia Qualifier
2023	Season 8	Group	16	14	-	2	29-13	.875	.690	1st	3rd-4th place 2–3; RRQ Sena	Eliminated in Indonesia Qualifier
2024	Season 9	Group	3	2	-	1	5-2	.667	.714	2nd	3rd-4th place 1–3; RRQ Sena	Eliminated in Indonesia Qualifier
2024	Season 9	Swiss	3	3	-	0	9-3	1.000	.818	1st	3rd-4th place 1–3; RRQ Sena	Eliminated in Indonesia Qualifier
2024	Season 10	Group	3	3	-	0	6-0	1.000	1.000	1st	3rd-4th place 0–3; RRQ Sena	Eliminated in Indonesia Qualifier
2024	Season 10	Swiss	5	3	-	2	13-6	.600	.684	6th	3rd-4th place 0–3; RRQ Sena	Eliminated in Indonesia Qualifier
2025	Season 11	Group	3	2	-	1	4–2	.667	.667	2nd	3rd-4th place 0–3; Diton	Eliminated in Indonesia Qualifier
2025	Season 11	Swiss	4	3	-	1	9-7	.750	.563	4th	3rd-4th place 0–3; Diton	Eliminated in Indonesia Qualifier
2025	Season 12	Group	3	3	-	0	6–0	1.000	1.000	1st	3rd-4th place 0–3; Bigetron Academy	Eliminated in Indonesia Qualifier
2025	Season 12	Swiss	4	3	-	1	10-4	.750	.714	3rd	3rd-4th place 0–3; Bigetron Academy	Eliminated in Indonesia Qualifier
2026	Season 13	Swiss	5	3	-	2	12-9	.600	.571	6th	5th-8th place 1–3; Bigetron Academy	Not Held
2026	Season 14	Swiss	4	3	-	1	11-6	.750	.647	3rd	5th-8th place 1–3; VL Team	Not Held
All-time stats			137	75	0	52	216-149	.591	.592	-	0 MDL titles	0 Finals titles
ONIC Pertiwi (S11-Present)
Year		MDL Indonesia										ESL competitions
Year		Stage	P	W	D	L	Match W-L	W-L%	Match W-L%	Seed	Playoffs	APAC/SEA Challenge Finals
2025	Season 11	Group	3	0	-	3	0–6	.000	.000	4th	Failed to qualify	Did not participate
2025	Season 11	Swiss	3	0	-	3	0-9	.000	.000	16th	Failed to qualify	Did not participate
2026	Season 14	Swiss	3	0	-	3	0-9	.000	.000	16th	Failed to qualify	Not held
All-time stats			9	0	0	9	0-24	.000	.000	-	0 MDL titles	0 Finals titles
ONIC Arsenals (S1-4) / ONIC x Nine Lives (S5) / ONIC x Minerva (S6) / ONIC Uprising (S7-Present)
Year		MDL Philippines										ESL competitions
Year		Stage	P	W	D	L	Match W-L	W-L%	Match W-L%	Seed	Playoffs	APAC/SEA Challenge Finals
2023	Season 1	Group	13	5	-	8	11-18	.385	.379	5th	Failed to qualify	Failed to qualify
2023	Season 2	Group	11	5	-	6	13-13	.455	.500	6th	5th-6th place 0–2; Euphoria Esports	Failed to qualify
2024	Season 3	Group	9	5	-	4	12-10	.556	.545	4th	5th-6th place 0–2; Echo Proud	Failed to qualify
2024	Season 4	Group	11	3	-	8	7-17	.273	.292	9th	Failed to qualify	Failed to qualify
2025	Season 5	Group	3	2	1	0	5-1	.667	.833	2nd Group D	1st place 4-1; Aurora Hunters	Eliminated in Philippines Qualifier
2025	Season 5	Seeding	2	2	-	0	4-1	1.000	.800	5th	1st place 4-1; Aurora Hunters	Eliminated in Philippines Qualifier
2025	Season 5	Play-ins	2	2	-	0	5-1	1.000	.833	5th	1st place 4-1; Aurora Hunters	Eliminated in Philippines Qualifier
2025	Season 6	Group	3	0	1	2	1-5	.000	.167	4th Group C	Failed to qualify	Eliminated in Philippines Qualifier
2025	Season 6	Seeding	2	2	-	0	4-0	1.000	1.000	13th	Failed to qualify	Eliminated in Philippines Qualifier
2025	Season 6	Play-ins	1	0	-	1	1-2	.000	.333	13th	Failed to qualify	Eliminated in Philippines Qualifier
2026	Season 7	Group	5	2	-	3	6-7	.400	.462	4th Group A	5th-6th place 0-3; Twisted Minds RWE	Not held
2026	Season 7	Last Chance	1	1	-	0	3-2	1.000	.600	5th	5th-6th place 0-3; Twisted Minds RWE	Not held
2026	Season 7	Play-ins	3	1	-	2	3-5	.333	.375	5th	5th-6th place 0-3; Twisted Minds RWE	Not held
2026	Season 8	Group	5	3	-	2	8-5	.600	.615	3rd Group B	5th-6th place 0-3; Twisted Minds RWE	Not held
2026	Season 8	Last Chance	0	0	-	0	0-0	–	–	3rd	5th-6th place 0-3; Twisted Minds RWE	Not held
2026	Season 8	Play-ins	3	2	-	1	4-3	.667	.571	3rd	5th-6th place 0-3; Twisted Minds RWE	Not held
All-time stats			74	35	2	37	87-90	.473	.492	-	1 MDL title	0 Finals titles

==== Mobile Legends: Bang Bang: Indonesia National Esports League ====
Mobile Legends: Bang Bang: Indonesia National Esports League results
ONIC Miracle
Year	Indonesia National Esports League										ESL competitions
Year	Division	P	W	D	L	Match W-L	W-L%	Match W-L%	Seed	Playoffs	APAC/SEA Challenge Finals
2023	Liga 2	17	9	4	4	22-12	.529	.647	5th	5th place Promoted to Liga 1	Did not qualify
2023	Liga 1	11	6	3	2	15-7	.545	.682	1st	4th place 1–2; Team Gryffin	Did not qualify
2024	Liga 1	13	9	3	1	21-5	.692	.808	2nd	1st place 3–0; EVOS Holy	Eliminated in Indonesia Qualifier
2025	Slot forfeited										Eliminated in Indonesia Qualifier
All-time stats		41	24	10	7	58-24	.585	.707	-	1 Lignas titles	0 Finals titles

=== Honours ===
Background shading indicates that the tournament is organized by Moonton.
Background shading indicates that the tournament is a national tournament.
Background shading indicates that the tournament is organized by ESL.

Indonesia ONIC ID
Tournament	Champions	Runners-up	Finals	Season won	Season runners-up	Best results
MPL Indonesia	8	2	10	S3, S8, S10, S11, S12, S13, S15, S16	S9, S17	Champions
Mobile Legends: Bang Bang Mid Season Cup	2	0	2	MSC 2019, MSC 2023	-	Champions
M World Championship	0	1	1	-	M5	Runners-up
MPL Invitational (defunct)	2	0	2	MPLI 2021, MPLI 2022	-	Champions
ESL SEA/APAC Challenge Finals	1	1	2	S3	S6	Champions
ESL Mobile Masters	0	0	0	-	-	5th-6th place
President's Cup	1	0	1	2019	-	Champions
Philippines ONIC PH
Tournament	Champions	Runners-up	Finals	Season won	Season runners-up	Best results
MPL Philippines	1	4	5	S14	S4, S5, S8, S15	Champions
Mobile Legends: Bang Bang Mid Season Cup	0	0	0	-	-	3rd place
M World Championship	1	1	2	M6	M3	Champions
MPL Invitational (defunct)	0	0	0	-	-	9th-12th place
ESL SEA/APAC Challenge Finals	1	0	1	S6	-	Champions
ESL Mobile Masters	1	0	1	MM 2025	-	Champions
Indonesia ONIC Prime
MDL Indonesia	0	0	0	-	-	3rd-4th place
Philippines ONIC Arsenals
MDL Philippines	1	0	1	S5	-	Champions
Indonesia ONIC Miracle (disbanded)
National Esports League (1st Division)	1	0	1	2024	-	Champions
Indonesia ONIC Pertiwi
Mobile Legends: Bang Bang Women's Invitational	0	0	0	-	-	5th-8th place

== Honor of Kings ==
=== History ===
ONIC Esports entered the Honor of Kings competitive scene in August 2024 in preparation for the Honor of Kings Championship 2024: Indonesia Qualifier.

=== Tournament history ===
Updated as of HOK 2026 Season

ONIC Esports
Year		Indonesia Kings Laga								World Cup	International championship
Year		G	W	L	MW	W-L%	MW-ML%	Seed	Playoffs	World Cup	International championship
2025	Spring	13	5	8	13–17	.385	.433	3rd Overlord	5th-6th place 0–2; Kagendra	Did not qualify	Did not qualify
2025	Fall	13	3	10	9-21	.231	.300	5th Tyrant	Did not qualify	Did not qualify	Did not qualify
2026	Spring	9	3	6	13–20	.333	.394	7th	Did not qualify	Did not qualify	Did not qualify
2026	Fall	9	3	6	12-20	.333	.375	8th	Did not qualify	Did not qualify	Did not qualify
All-time stats		44	14	30	47–78	.318	.376	–	0 IKL titles	0 KWC titles	0 KIC titles

== Pokémon Unite ==
=== History ===
In April 2024, ONIC Esports entered the Pokémon Unite scene by acquiring the RISE roster.

=== Tournament history ===
Updated as of Pokemon Unite 2026 Season

Pokémon Unite Professional League results
ONIC Rise
Year	Asia Champions League										Championship Series Indonesia	World Championship
Year	P	W	L	Match W-L	W-L%	Match W-L%	Seed	Playoffs (SEA)	Winter Tournament SEA West	Finals	Championship Series Indonesia	World Championship
2024	Played under RISE										1st place 2-0, 2-1; Onyx	3rd place 2-1; FUSION
2025	9	7	2	14–6	.778	.700	2nd	5th-6th place 0-2; Paper Rex	1st place 2-0; EVOS Onyx	9th-12th place Group Stage; 1-2	1st place 2-1; Onyx	17th-24th place Group Stage; 0-2
2026	Different format						1st	1st place 3-2; FULL SENSE	Did not need to participate	7th-8th place 0-2; SCARZ	1st place 3-0; TryHard	17th-24th place Group Stage; 1-2

=== Honours ===
Indonesia ONIC Rise
Tournament	Champions	Runners-up	3rd place	Best results
Pokémon UNITE; Championship Series - Indonesia	3 (2024, 2025, 2026)	0	0	1st place
Pokémon UNITE; Asia Champions League (SEA)	1 (2026)	0	0	1st place
Pokémon UNITE; Winter Tournament SEA West	1 (2025)	0	0	1st place
Pokémon UNITE; World Championship	0	0	1 (2024)	3rd place

== Disbanded teams ==
=== Valorant ===
==== Tournament history ====
===== Valorant Champions Tour – VCT Challengers Format (2021–2022) =====
ONIC Esports Valorant
Year	VCT Challengers								Masters 1	Masters 2	Champions
Year	Competition	G	W	L	Map W–L	Round W–L	Seed	Playoffs	Masters 1	Masters 2	Champions
2022	Indonesia Stage 1	2	2	0	4–0	52–33	1st Group B	3rd place 0-2; Boom Esports	Masters Reykjavík; Did not qualify	Masters Copenhagen; Did not qualify	Champions Istanbul; Did not qualify
2022	APAC Stage 1	3	1	2	3–5	84–87	3rd Group C	Did not qualify	Masters Reykjavík; Did not qualify	Masters Copenhagen; Did not qualify	Champions Istanbul; Did not qualify
2022	Indonesia Stage 2	7	6	1	13–4	199–165	1st	1st place 3-0; Alter Ego	Masters Reykjavík; Did not qualify	Masters Copenhagen; Did not qualify	Champions Istanbul; Did not qualify
2022	APAC Stage 2	2	2	0	4-0	52-23	1st Group A	4th place 0-2; XERXIA	Masters Reykjavík; Did not qualify	Masters Copenhagen; Did not qualify	Champions Istanbul; Did not qualify

== Performance in Esports World Cup (EWC) ==
=== History ===
In March 2025, ONIC Esports was selected as one of three Indonesian organizations—alongside RRQ and EVOS Esports—to join the Esports World Cup Foundation's Club Partner Program.

=== Results ===
Updated as of EWC 2026

Key – result
Colour	Meaning
Gold	Winner
Silver	Second place
Bronze	Third place or equivalent
Green	Other points position
Blue	Other classified position
Red	Did not qualify (DNQ)
White	Did not enter (DNE)
Tan	Game not featured

Key – team status
Colour	Meaning
Light green	Active
Light Pink	Disbanded

Key – symbols
Symbol	Meaning
†	Not eligible for EWC points

ONIC Esports performance by game
Game		Team	2024	2025	2026
Apex Legends		ONIC Esports	DNE	DNQ	DNE
Call of Duty: Warzone		ONIC Esports	DNE	DNQ	DNE
Fatal Fury: City of the Wolves		ONIC Esports	N/A	9–12	25-32
Fortnite		ONIC Esports	DNE	N/A	34
Free Fire		ONIC Olympus	17	14	DNQ
Honor of Kings		ONIC Esports	DNE	DNQ	DNQ
Mobile Legends: Bang Bang	Men's	ONIC ID	9–12	4	3
Mobile Legends: Bang Bang	Men's	ONIC PH	DNQ	3	DNQ
Mobile Legends: Bang Bang	Women's	ONIC ZOL	DNQ	DNE	DNE
Mobile Legends: Bang Bang	Women's	ONIC Pertiwi	DNE	5–8	DNQ
Mobile Legends: Bang Bang	Women's	ONIC Mongolia	DNE	DNE	DNQ
Street Fighter 6		ONIC Esports	DNE	37–48	5–8
Tekken 8		ONIC Esports	DNE	DNQ	17-24
Teamfight Tactics		ONIC APAC	DNE	DNQ	DNE
Teamfight Tactics		ONIC AMER	DNE	DNQ	DNE
Trackmania		ONIC Esports	N/A	N/A	DNQ
Total points			0	700	700

== Rosters ==
Onic Esports rosters

Mobile Legends: Bang Bang ONIC Indonesia
Handle	Name	Nationality
Kairi	Kairi Ygnacio Rayosdelsol	Philippines
Supergasz	Bagas arafa	Indonesia
SANZ	Gilang	Indonesia
Frezyee	Mardi saputra	Indonesia
Kelra	Grant Duane Pillas	Philippines
Lutpiii	Moch Lutfi Ardianto	Cambodia
Kiboy	Nicky Fernando Pontonuwu	Indonesia
SamueL	Sam Hosyo	Indonesia

Mobile Legends: Bang Bang ONIC Philippines
Handle	Name	Nationality
Kirk	Jann Kirk Solcruz Gutierrez	Philippines
K1NGKONG	King Cyric Perez	Philippines
Super Frince	Frince Miguel Ramirez	Philippines
Brusko	Borris James Parro	Philippines
Savero	Clayton Adrielo Kuswanto	Indonesia
Ryota	Nowee Cabailo Macasa	Philippines

Mobile Legends: Bang Bang ONIC Pertiwi
Handle	Name	Nationality
Pou	N/A	Indonesia
NAMIRA	N/A	Indonesia
Livi	N/A	Indonesia
XEV	N/A	Indonesia
Y1PPY	N/A	Indonesia
Carista	N/A	Indonesia

Mobile Legends: Bang Bang ONIC Prodigy
Handle	Name	Nationality
Munsters	Mahendra, I Ketut Rio	Indonesia
Bouy	Junior, Boy Ramadhan	Indonesia
KilluaaHz	Styawan, Agung	Indonesia
Natex	Haidar, Muhammad Nabil	Indonesia
Samuel	Hosyo, Sam Salomo	Indonesia
Narashi	Firdaus, Sabyan Gentha	Indonesia
Reyna	N/A	Indonesia
Nanjet	N/A	Indonesia
Dannqt	Nurhamdan, Muhammad	Indonesia
Medzz	N/A	Indonesia
Clevea	N/A	Indonesia

Mobile Legends: Bang Bang ONIC x Nine Lives
Handle	Name	Nationality
Lansu	Misa, Lance Aron	Philippines
Kayn	Sombilon, Alejandro Hgon	Philippines
Sionnn	Alcantara, Miguel	Philippines
Kodrex	Figueroa, Erdie	Philippines
Nosia	Guevarra, Mico	Philippines
MZU1	Hilario, Emmanuel	Philippines
Caloy	Roma, John Carlo	Philippines
Kryptonite	Parco, John Lester	Philippines

Garena Free Fire ONIC Olympus
Handle	Name	Nationality
Jek	Ramdani, Adam	Indonesia
Xyro	N/A	Indonesia
Wings	Erwin	Indonesia
CrimeMKS	Raehan, Muhammad	Indonesia

Pokemon Unite ONIC Rise
Handle	Name	Nationality
AXQ	Ardiyanto, Deny	Indonesia
dev	Lie, Devsen Putra	Indonesia
Eeyorr	Panggabean, Judha	Indonesia
illuna	Said, Novrizal Diananta	Indonesia
Zoe	Irawan, Muhammad Haikal	Indonesia
Cell	N/A	Indonesia

Honor of Kings ONIC
Handle	Name	Nationality
Butsss	Sanubari, Muhammad Satrya	Indonesia
Susugajah	Hadi, Ilham Bahrul	Indonesia
Lexx	Phang Alex	Indonesia
Falah	Falah, Gilang Dwi	Indonesia
Luochen	N/A	Malaysia

E-Football ONIC
Handle	Name	Nationality
Franc	Franc, Philip	Indonesia
Dennis BK	Bernard, Dennis	Indonesia

Legend:
- (I) Inactive
- (S) Suspended
- (L) On loan
- (2W) Two-way player
- Substitute
- (injured) Injury / Illness

Awards and achievements
Preceded by AP Bren	M champions 2024	Succeeded by TBA
Preceded by Aether Main; RSG Philippines	MSC champions 2019; 2023	Succeeded by Execration; Selangor Red Giants
Preceded by Alter Ego Esports; Themselves	ONE Esports Invititational; 2021; 2022	Succeeded by Themselves; RSG Philippines
Preceded by RRQ.O2; EVOS Legends; RRQ Hoshi; Themselves; Themselves; Themselves; Team Liquid ID; Themselves	MPL Indonesia champions 2019 - Season 3; 2021 - Season 8; 2022 - Season 10; 2023 - Season 11; 2023 - Season 12; 2024 - Season 13; 2025 - Season 15; 2025 - Season 16	Succeeded by EVOS Legends; RRQ Hoshi; Themselves; Themselves; Themselves; Team Liquid ID; Themselves; TBA
Preceded by Liquid ECHO	MPL Philippines champions 2024 - Season 14	Succeeded by Team Liquid PH
