= Free Fire Daybreak =

Japanese anime television series

フリーファイアデイブレイク (Furī Faia Deibureiku)
- Created by: Garena; Kadokawa
- Anime television series
- Directed by: Ken Takahashi
- Written by: Hotaru Asafuji
- Music by: Koji Fujimoto
- Studio: Candy Box
- Original run: Q2 2027 – scheduled

Free Fire Daybreak (Japanese: フリーファイアデイブレイク, Hepburn: Furī Faia Deibureiku) is an upcoming anime television series based on the Garena mobile game Free Fire. The series is produced by Candy Box and directed by Ken Takahashi, and features scripts by Hotaru Asafuji and music by Koji Fujimoto of Sus4 Inc. It is scheduled to premiere in Q2 2027.

== Characters ==
Kelly (ケリー, Kerī)
Hayato (ハヤト)
Moco (モコ, Moko)
