= RRQ (esports) =

Indonesian esports organization

Rex Regum Qeon
- Nickname: King of Kings
- Short name: RRQ
- Divisions: Active (13): Mobile Legends: Bang Bang (2017–present); PUBG Mobile (2018–present); Free Fire (2019–present); Valorant (2020–present); Honor of Kings (2024–present) eFootball (2025–present); Street Fighter 6 (2019, 2025–present); Teamfight Tactics (2025–present); Tekken 8 (2025–present); Delta Force (2025–present); Apex Legends (2019, 2025–present); TrackMania (2026–present); Arena of Valor (2017–2019, 2026–present) Past (8): Dota 2 (2013–2019); Point Blank (2017–2019); PUBG (2018–2019); Counter-Strike (2018–2019); Call of Duty: Mobile (2020); Wild Rift (2021–2023); Pokémon Unite (2023); EA Sports FC (2022)
- Founded: 22 October 2013; 13 years ago
- Based in: Jakarta, Indonesia
- Location: Southeast Asia; Previous: Brazil; South Korea
- Colors: Black Gold White
- Owner: Midplaza Holding
- CEO: Andrian Pauline Husen
- Official fan club: RRQ Kingdom
- Partners: realme Asus ROG; Shopee Pay; Ayana; Biznet; Pop Mie; Sukro; GODA; VIrtu Digilab; Muse Communication
- Parent group: PT. Qeon Interactive
- Website: teamrrq.com

Rex Regum Qeon (RRQ), known by the nickname "King of Kings", is an esports organization based in Indonesia founded by Andrian "AP" Pauline Husen and Riki Kawano "Qeon" Suliawan. The organization currently competes in professional tournaments in the games of Mobile Legends: Bang Bang, PUBG Mobile, Free Fire, Valorant, Honor of Kings, Apex Legends, eFootball, Teamfight Tactics, Tekken 8, Delta Force, and Trackmania.

RRQ was founded in October 2013 and initially started as an Indonesian DotA team. In 2017, Andrian Pauline was appointed as CEO. Starting from that point, RRQ began expanding into several esports titles, which are Point Blank, PUBG: Battlegrounds, and Mobile Legends: Bang Bang.

As of the end of 2024, RRQ has won a total of four world championship titles: two in Point Blank (PBIC 2017 with RRQ Endeavour and PBWC 2019 with RRQ TCN), and two in PUBG Mobile (including the PUBG Mobile Star Challenge 2018 with RRQ Athena).

RRQ was ranked as the third most popular esports organization team in the world in 2020. In a report released by Shareable titled "The State of Social Media 2020", the team's fan activity on social media throughout 2020 had reached 26.5 million activities.

In 2024, RRQ Hoshi was ranked as the second most-watched esports team in the world, behind T1, with more than 112.2 million hours watched. In a separate ranking covering esports organizations across all competitive divisions, RRQ placed sixth worldwide.

In 2025, RRQ Hoshi remained among the world's most-watched esports teams, ranking fourth with 95.207 million hours watched.

== Organizational Divisions ==
RRQ operates several divisions and programs that support its esports activities, commercial operations, and community engagement.

Team RRQ is RRQ's main esports division, fielding professional teams in competitive titles such as Mobile Legends: Bang Bang, Free Fire, and VALORANT. The division the organization in domestic and international esports competitions.

RRQ Networks is RRQ's talent management division for streamers, content creators, and influencers. The division supports creator development and brand collaborations across esports, entertainment, and digital media.

RRQ Kingdom is RRQ's official fan community. The community supports RRQ teams across competitions and is also involved in fan activities, watch parties, and community programs organized by RRQ.

RRQSHOP, previously known as RRQ Topup, is RRQ's digital platform for purchasing game credits and vouchers. The platform provides top-up services for players across supported games and payment methods.

RRQ Store is RRQ's merchandise and apparel division. It sells official RRQ-branded products, including team jerseys, casual apparel, and lifestyle collections.

RRQ Arena is RRQ's community and gaming space for fans, students, and players. The division hosts activities such as tournaments, events, and community programs related to gaming and esports.

RRQ Mabar is the RRQ's youth and school-focused program related to esports, gaming, and creative activities. The program includes esports competitions, cosplay contests, and the School Ambassador initiative.

== RRQ City Tour (RRQ Keliling Kota) ==
RRQ City Tour is a community program organized by RRQ that combines watch parties, fan gatherings, and roadshow events in various cities across Indonesia. As of May 2026, the program had been held in 112 city stops across 61 cities.

The first season of RRQ City Tour began in Tangerang on February 24, 2023, with 42 attendees. The season was later held in 12 cities and recorded approximately 2,000 total attendees. Semarang served as the final stop of the first season on March 25, 2023.

RRQ City Tour returned for its second season from July 14 to September 24, 2023. During this season, RRQ held events in 16 cities and recorded nearly 7,000 attendees.

The third season was held from March to May 2024, alongside RRQ Hoshi's participation in MPL Indonesia Season 13. RRQ City Tour Season 3 was held in 16 cities and recorded more than 8,000 attendees.

RRQ City Tour Season 4 was held from August 10 to October 6, 2024. The season visited 16 cities in Indonesia: Semarang, Pekalongan, Serang, Cirebon, Banyuwangi, Balikpapan, Banjarbaru, Pangkal Pinang, Padang, Medan, Manado, Lampung, Surabaya, Madiun, Cianjur, Bandung. RRQ City Tour Season 4 recorded nearly 12,000 attendees, making it the largest season of the program at the time.

RRQ City Tour Season 5 was held from March 7 to May 25, 2025. The season was scheduled across 16 cities in Indonesia: Surabaya, Madura, Jambi, Bandung, Indramayu, Semarang, Salatiga, Manado, Yogyakarta, Cilacap, Banjarmasin, Palangkaraya, Padang, Medan, Cilegon, and Bali.

== Salary ==
Andrian Pauline, CEO of RRQ, during an interview with Kompas TV in 2021, stated that his esports organization paid team players a monthly income, roughly around 1 to 3 million Rupiahs per month.

== Collaboration ==
=== Attack on Titan collaboration ===
RRQ and Muse Asia announced their first collaboration with the release on RRQ x Attack on Titan merchandise in November 2022, with AoT, originally written by Hajime Isayama, approaching their final season.

=== That Time I Got Reincarnated as a Slime collaboration ===
In early 2025, RRQ become the first ever esports club to have a anime jersey, based on That Time I Got Reincarnated as a Slime anime, written by Fuse and illustrated by Mitz Vah for light novel and Taiki Kawakami for manga, published by Kodansha. The collaboration itself marked a significant milestone and history for the esports and anime community, as this was the first time there was an anime theme on an esports jersey. The jersey also co-licensed by Muse Asia, the distributor and licensee of the anime itself featuring new front sponsor, realme.

=== Frieren collaboration ===
Following the success of Tensura collaboration, Muse Asia and RRQ continue their partnership to release 2026 early kits and collections based on Frieren anime, originally written by Kanehito Yamada and illustrated by Tsukasa Abe with the tagline "Inspired by a Journey That Never Fades". The collections featruring Himmel jacket, Frieren shirt, Frieren varsity jacket and Frieren Zoltraak coach jacket.

=== Bleach collaboration ===
On July 18, 2026, RRQ launched an exclusive fashion collection in collaboration with Bleach, the Japanese manga and anime series. The collection consisted of eight limited-quantity products, including three T-shirts, two fantasy jerseys, two bomber jackets, and one coach jacket.

== Mobile Legends: Bang Bang ==
=== History ===
RRQ Esports entered the Mobile Legends: Bang Bang (MLBB) competitive scene in 2017 with the formation of RRQ.O2, one of Indonesia's pioneering professional teams. In MPL Indonesia Season 1, RRQ.O2 dominated the regular season, finishing at the top of the standings. However, they fell short in the playoffs, finishing in 3rd place. Determined to bounce back, RRQ.O2 returned stronger in MPL Indonesia Season 2, securing their first-ever MPL ID championship by defeating EVOS Legends in the grand final.

==== Partnership with PSG ====
In February 2019, the organization signed a partnership with a European football club, Paris Saint-Germain F.C. (PSG), It was announced in a press conference held at the Dharmawangsa Hotel, Jakarta. Through its esports division, PSG esports had officially collaborated with Team RRQ for the 3rd season of Mobile Legends: Bang Bang Professional League Indonesia on 16 February 2019. Their partnership had ended in July 2019.

==== Expansion to Brazil ====
After concluding in the MLBB M3 World Championship, Brazilian representatives Keyd Stars' roster disbanded. This was later confirmed by one of its roster members. However, during the eve of the ninth season of MPL Indonesia, RRQ announced their expansion to MPL Brazil, to form RRQ Akira. The roster mainly comprised most of the players of Keyd Stars. RRQ Akira disbanded at the end of the 2024 season after their journey ended in wildcard round of M6 World Championship.

==== Expansion to Philippines ====
In July 2023, RRQ announced its expansion into the Philippines, marking its entry into the region's competitive Mobile Legends: Bang Bang Development League (MDL PH). This move came ahead of MDL Philippines season 2, where RRQ aimed to develop rising talents in the country's MLBB scene.

The team, known as RRQ Kaito, won their first and only MDL PH in season 3 by taking down ECHO Proud in a close 3–2 game and denying ECHO's three-peat. The rosterlater won the SIBOL National team qualifier ahead of International Esports Federation (IeSF) 2024 event where the main five were selected alongside Falcons AP Bren's jungler, Kyle "KyleTzy" Sayson. A year later, the team was disbanded in December 2025 to make room for MPL MY expansion, mainly due to the partnership system that was created in the Malaysia scene.

==== Expansion to Malaysia ====
Just after they disbanded the Philippines team, they were accepted as one of the eight founding partnership teams for the new MPL MY system in February 2026, ahead of the upcoming Season 17. The partnership system was planned for eight teams with five of them coming from outside of Malaysia, including Indonesia. The full roster was announced on 12 March 2026 featuring former RRQ Hoshi player, Rendy "Dyrennn" Syahputra and former ONIC Esports and Team SMG gold laner, Lu "Sasa" Khai Bean as the head coach, previously become the first ever Malaysian to win an international event with his infamous Kage squad in Mobile Legends: Bang Bang Southeast Asia Cup (MSC) 2019.

=== Tournament history ===
Updated as of MLBB 2026 Season

==== Mobile Legends: Bang Bang Professional League ====
RRQ Hoshi
Year			MPL Indonesia									Moonton international competitions			ESL competitions	
Year			G	W	D	L	MW	W-L%	MW-ML%	Seed	Playoffs	MLBB Mid-Season Cup	MPL Invitational	MLBB World Championship	APAC/SEA Challenge Finals	Mobile Masters
2018	Season 1	MPL–ID	9	7	2	0	16–2	.778	.889	1st	3rd place 0–2; Team NXL	3rd place 0–2; Aerowolf Roxy	Not held	Not held	Not held	
2018	Season 2	MPL–ID	9	7	–	2	16–6	.778	.727	3rd	1st place 3–0; EVOS Esports	3rd place 0–2; Aerowolf Roxy	Not held	Not held	Not held	
2019	Season 3	MPL–ID	11	6	–	5	15–12	.545	.556	5th	7th–8th place 1–2; Bigetron Alpha	Did not qualify	Not held	2nd place 3–4; EVOS Legends	Not held	
2019	Season 4	MPL–ID	14	10	–	4	22–13	.714	.629	2nd	2nd place 1–3; EVOS Legends	Did not qualify	Not held	2nd place 3–4; EVOS Legends	Not held	
2020	Season 5	MPL–ID	14	11	–	3	22–8	.786	.733	1st	1st place 3–2; EVOS Legends	Cancelled due to the COVID–19 pandemic	1st place 3–0; Resurgence	3rd place 1–3; Bren Esports	Not held	
2020	Season 6	MPL–ID	14	10	–	4	22–11	.714	.667	2nd	1st place 3–2; Alter Ego	Cancelled due to the COVID–19 pandemic	5th–8th place 0–2; Alter Ego	3rd place 1–3; Bren Esports	Not held	
2021	Season 7	MPL–ID	14	9	–	5	22–14	.643	.611	3rd	5th–6th place 1–2; Aerowolf	Did not qualify	3rd–4th place 1–2; Blacklist Int.	4th–5th place 0–3; Blacklist Int.	Not held	
2021	Season 8	MPL–ID	14	10	–	4	22–9	.714	.710	2nd	2nd place 3–4; ONIC Esports	Did not qualify	3rd–4th place 1–2; Blacklist Int.	4th–5th place 0–3; Blacklist Int.	Not held	
2022	Season 9	MPL–ID	14	12	–	2	25–8	.857	.758	1st	1st place 4–1; ONIC Esports	2nd place 0– 4 RSG Philippines	13th–20th place 1–2; Geek Fam ID	3rd place 1–3; ECHO	Not held	
2022	Season 10	MPL–ID	14	9	–	5	18–14	.643	.563	2nd	2nd place 1–4; ONIC Esports	2nd place 0– 4 RSG Philippines	13th–20th place 1–2; Geek Fam ID	3rd place 1–3; ECHO	Not held	
2023	Season 11	MPL–ID	14	9	–	5	22–15	.643	.595	2nd	4th place 2–3; EVOS Legends	Did not qualify	9th–12th Group Stage finish	Did not qualify	Eliminated in Challenge Season (S3)	Not held
2023	Season 12	MPL–ID	16	11	–	5	24–16	.688	.600	2nd	4th place 0–3; Bigetron Alpha	Did not qualify	9th–12th Group Stage finish	Did not qualify	Eliminated in Challenge Season (S3)	Not held
2024	Season 13	MPL–ID	16	7	–	9	18–22	.438	.450	6th	5th–6th place 2–3; Geek Fam ID	Did not qualify	Defunct	5th–6th 1–3; Selangor Red Giants	Eliminated in Challenge Season (S5)	Not held
2024	Season 14	MPL–ID	16	13	–	3	28–11	.813	.718	1st	2nd place 3–4; Team Liquid ID	Did not qualify	Defunct	5th–6th 1–3; Selangor Red Giants	Eliminated in Challenge Season (S5)	Not held
2025	Season 15	MPL–ID	16	12	–	4	25–14	.750	.641	1st	2nd place 3–4; ONIC	5th–8th place 2–3; SRG.OG	Defunct	Did not qualify	5th–6th place 1–2; ONIC Philippines (S6)	2nd place 1–4; ONIC Philippines
2025	Season 16	MPL–ID	16	6	–	10	29–5	.375	.405	7th	Did not qualify	5th–8th place 2–3; SRG.OG	Defunct	Did not qualify	5th–6th place 1–2; ONIC Philippines (S6)	2nd place 1–4; ONIC Philippines
2026	Season 17	MPL–ID	16	2	–	14	29–8	.125	.216	9th	Did not qualify	Did not qualify	Defunct	Did not qualify	Not held	
2026	Season 18	MPL–ID	16	4	–	12	14-27	.250	.341	8th	Did not qualify	Did not qualify	Defunct	Did not qualify	Not held	
All-time stats			253	155	2	96	354–253	.618	.583	–	4 MPL titles	0 MSC titles	1 MPLI title	0 Worlds titles	0 Finals titles	0 Masters titles
RRQ Akira (disbanded)
Year			MPL Brazil / Liga LATAM									Moonton international competitions			ESL competitions	
Year			G	W	D	L	MW	W-L%	MW-ML%	Seed	Playoffs	MLBB Mid-Season Cup	MPL Invitational	MLBB World Championship	LATAM Challenge Finals	Mobile Masters
2022	Season 2	MPL–BRA	7	6	–	1	12–3	.857	.800	2nd	1st place 4–0; DreamMax	Region not competing ^2	Region not competing ^3	7th–8th place 1–3; The Valley	Not held	Not held
2022	Season 2	Liga LATAM	3	3	–	0	3–0	1.000	1.000	2nd	1st place 4–1; Malvinas Gaming	Region not competing ^2	Region not competing ^3	7th–8th place 1–3; The Valley	Not held	Not held
2023	Season 3	MPL–BRA	14	14	–	0	28–2	1.000	.933	1st	1st place 4–1; DreamMax	Region not competing ^2	Region not competing ^3	13th–16th place Group Stage	Not held	Not held
2023	Season 4	MPL–BRA	7	7	–	0	14–0	1.000	1.000	1st	1st place 4–0; Bigetron Sons	Region not competing ^2	Region not competing ^3	13th–16th place Group Stage	Not held	Not held
2023	Season 3	Liga LATAM	–	–	–	–	–	–	–	–	1st place 4–0; Bigetron Sons	Region not competing ^2	Region not competing ^3	13th–16th place Group Stage	Not held	Not held
2024	Season 5	MPL–BRA	7	6	–	1	13–2	.857	.867	1st	1st place 4–1; Bigetron Sons	13th–16th place Group Stage Finish	Defunct	Wild card group stage 2–1	2nd place 0–2; Bigetron Sons	Not held
2024	Season 1	MPL–LATAM^1	7	6	1	0	–	.857	–	1st	1st place 4–2; Entity7	13th–16th place Group Stage Finish	Defunct	Wild card group stage 2–1	2nd place 0–2; Bigetron Sons	Not held
2024	Season 2	MPL–LATAM^1	3	3	–	0	6–1	1.000	.857	1st	2nd place 0–4; Entity7	13th–16th place Group Stage Finish	Defunct	Wild card group stage 2–1	2nd place 0–2; Bigetron Sons	Not held
All-time stats			48	45	1	2	76–8	.938	.905	–	4 MPL-BRA titles 1 MPL-LATAM titles 2 Liga LATAM titles	0 MSC titles	0 MPLI titles	0 Worlds titles	0 Finals titles	0 Masters titles
RRQ Tora
Year			MPL Malaysia									Moonton international competitions			ESL competitions	
Year			G	W	D	L	MW	W-L%	MW-ML%	Seed	Playoffs	MLBB Mid-Season Cup	MPL Invitational	MLBB World Championship	APAC/SEA Challenge Finals	Mobile Masters
2026	Season 17	MPL–MY	14	6	–	8	12–18	.429	.400	6th	5th-6th place 0-3; Team Vamos	Did not qualify	Defunct	Did not qualify	Not held	
2026	Season 18	MPL–MY	14	3	–	11	11–24	.214	.314	8th	Did not qualify	Did not qualify	Defunct	Did not qualify	Not held	
All-time stats			28	9	–	19	23–42	.321	.354	–	0 MPL MY titles	0 MSC titles	0 MPLI titles	0 Worlds titles	0 Finals titles	0 Masters titles

==== Mobile Legends: Bang Bang Development League ====
Mobile Legends: Bang Bang Development League
RRQ Sena
Year		MDL Indonesia										ESL competitions
Year		Stage	GP	W	D	L	MW	W-L%	MW-ML%	Finish	Playoffs	APAC/SEA Challenge Finals
2020	1	Group	11	5	–	6	11–13	.455	.458	6th	5th–8th place 0–2; Victim Esports	Not held
2020	2	Group	10	9	–	1	19–6	.900	.760	1st	2nd place 1–3; Siren Clan	Not held
2021	3	Group	13	8	–	5	19–13	.615	.594	5th	7th–8th place 1–2; KINGS Esports	Not held
2021	4	Group	13	6	–	7	17–17	.462	.500	7th	5th–6th place 0–2; AURA Esports	Not held
2022	5	Group	13	7	–	6	16–14	.538	.533	7th	9th–10th place 1–2; Rebellion Sinai	Not held
2022	6	Group	13	10	–	3	21–12	.769	.636	3rd	4th–5th place 1–2; Bigetron Beta	Not held
2023	7	Group	15	10	–	5	24–15	.667	.615	3rd	5th–8th place 1–3; EVOS Icon	Did not qualify
2023	8	Group	16	12	–	4	27–12	.750	.692	3rd	2nd place 2–4; Bossque	Did not qualify
2024	9	Group	3	1	–	2	4–4	.333	.500	3rd	2nd place 3–4; Geek Fam ID Jr	Eliminated in Open Finals
2024	9	Swiss	4	3	–	1	11–4	.750	.733	2nd	2nd place 3–4; Geek Fam ID Jr	Eliminated in Open Finals
2024	10	Group	3	1	–	2	2–5	.333	.286	3rd	1st place 4–2; Bigetron Beta	Eliminated in Open Finals
2024	10	Swiss	4	3	–	1	11–7	.750	.611	3rd	1st place 4–2; Bigetron Beta	Eliminated in Open Finals
2025	11	Group	3	2	–	1	4–3	.667	.571	3rd	Did not qualify	Did not qualify
2025	11	Swiss	5	2	–	3	9–10	.400	.474	10th	Did not qualify	Did not qualify
2025	12	Group	3	2	–	1	5–3	.667	.625	1st	Did not qualify	Did not qualify
2025	12	Swiss	5	2	–	3	9–10	.400	.474	9th	Did not qualify	Did not qualify
2026	13	Swiss	4	3	-	1	10-6	.750	.625	3rd	3th-4th place 1–3; Bigetron Academy	Not held
2026	14	Swiss	5	2	-	3	11-9	.400	.550	9th	Did not qualify	Not held
All-time stats			138	86	0	52	221–153	.623	.591	–	1 MDL title	0 Finals titles
RRQ Kaito (disbanded)
Year		MDL Philippines										ESL competitions
Year		Stage	P	W	D	L	MW	W-L%	MW-ML%	Finish	Playoffs	APAC/SEA Challenge Finals
2023	2	Group	11	5	-	6	13–14	.455	.481	9th	Did not qualify	Did not qualify
2024	3	Group	9	9	-	0	18–3	1.000	.857	1st	1st place 3–2; ECHO Proud	Eliminated in Open Finals
2024	4	Group	11	8	-	3	19–7	.727	.731	3rd	2nd place 3–4; Lazy Esports	Eliminated in Open Finals
2025	5	Group	3	2	-	1	4–2	.667	.667	2nd	3rd place 3–4; Aurora Hunters	Eliminated in Open Finals
2025	5	Seeding	3	2	-	1	5–2	.667	.714	6th	3rd place 3–4; Aurora Hunters	Eliminated in Open Finals
2025	5	Play-ins	2	2	-	0	5–0	1.000	1.000	6th	3rd place 3–4; Aurora Hunters	Eliminated in Open Finals
2025	6	Group	3	2	1	0	5–1	.667	.833	1st	2nd place 2–4; AP.Bren x RWE	Eliminated in Open Finals
2025	6	Seeding	3	2	-	1	4–2	.667	.667	2nd	2nd place 2–4; AP.Bren x RWE	Eliminated in Open Finals
2025	6	Play-ins	2	2	-	0	5–0	1.000	1.000	2nd	2nd place 2–4; AP.Bren x RWE	Eliminated in Open Finals
All-time stats			47	34	1	12	78–31	.739	.716	–	1 MDL title	0 Finals titles

=== Honours ===
Background shading indicates that the tournament is organized by Moonton.
Background shading indicates that the tournament is a national tournament.
Background shading indicates that the tournament is organized by ESL.

Indonesia RRQ.O2 / RRQ Hoshi
Tournament	Champions	Runners-up	Finals	Season won	Season runners-up	Best results
MPL Indonesia	4	5	9	S2, S5, S6, S9	S4, S8, S10, S14, S15	Champions
Mobile Legends: Bang Bang Mid Season Cup	0	1	1	–	MSC 2022	Runners-up
M World Championship	0	1	1	–	M1	Runners-up
MPL Invitational (defunct)	1	0	1	MPLI 2020 S1	–	Champions
ESL SEA/APAC Challenge Finals	0	0	0	–	–	5th–6th place
ESL Mobile Masters	0	1	1	–	MM 2025	Runners-up
President's Cup	0	0	0	–	–	3rd place
Malaysia RRQ Tora
Tournament	Champions	Runners-up	Finals	Season won	Season runners-up	Best results
MPL Malaysia	0	0	0	–	–	5th-6th place
Brazil RRQ Akira (disbanded)
Tournament	Champions	Runners-up	Finals	Season won	Season runners-up	Best results
MPL Brazil (defunct)	4	0	4	S2, S3, S4, S5	–	Champions
Liga LATAM (defunct)	2	0	2	S2, S3	–	Champions
MPL-LATAM	1	1	2	S1	S2	Champions
ESL SPS LATAM Challenge Finals	0	1	1	–	S5	Runners-up
Indonesia RRQ Sena
Tournament	Champions	Runners-up	Finals	Season won	Season runners-up	Best results
MDL Indonesia	1	3	4	S10	S2, S8, S9	Champions
President's Cup	0	0	0	–	–	3rd–4th place
Philippines RRQ Kaito (disbanded)
Tournament	Champions	Runners-up	Finals	Season won	Season runners-up	Best results
MDL Philippines	1	2	3	S3	S4, S6	Champions

=== Rosters ===
Updated as of 30 April 2026

RRQ Mobile Legends: Bang Bang rosters

Mobile Legends: Bang Bang Hoshi
Handle	Name	Nationality
Joshua	Elshad	Indonesia
Demonkite	Jonard Cedrix Caranto	Philippines
Habil	Habil Azhari Akbar	Indonesia
Said	Said Ali Ridho	Indonesia
SuperDitzz	Aditya Nugraha	Indonesia
Clayyy	Deden Muhammad Nurhasan	Indonesia
Hajirin	Hajirin Arafat	Indonesia
Arthur	Arthur Christopher Sunarkho (Note: Formerly Sutsujin.)	Indonesia

Mobile Legends: Bang Bang Sena
Handle	Name	Nationality
Rezzz	Muhammad Reza Kurniawan	Indonesia
Rexlona	Prayoga Naufal	Indonesia
Ciko	Marsiko Adi	Indonesia
Let Down	Zahran Ariel Ramadani	Indonesia
Zunesh	Ilyas Prasetyo	Indonesia
Shane	Akhiles Shane Valentino	Indonesia

Mobile Legends: Bang Bang Tora
Handle	Name	Nationality
Super Yoshi	Czedrick Jaylord Romero	Philippines
Dyrennn	Rendy Syahputra	Indonesia
Gary	Muhammad Syafizan Najmi Kamarulzaman	Malaysia
Rough	Dhiya' Harith Hazran Shahrul Hadafi	Malaysia
Kyym	Adam Alhakim Mohamad Ali	Malaysia
AJ	Muhammad Azri Jamaluddin	Malaysia
Widy (L)	Christian Widy Wardhana Hartono	Indonesia

Legend:
- (I) Inactive
- (S) Suspended
- (L) On loan
- (2W) Two-way player
- Substitute
- (injured) Injury / Illness

Notes
1. All tournaments in South America will be played in under one tournament named MPL–LATAM, the direct successor to MPL Brazil and Liga LATAM.
2. Previously known as the Southeast Asia Cup with selected regions only participating in the said event. In 2024, it was rebranded to the Mid Season Cup making the first iteration of the tournament South America's first appearance.
3. Only Southeast Asian teams competed in the ONE Esports MPL Invitational from 2020 to 2023.

== Garena Delta Force ==
=== History ===
==== Partnership with 7Sins ====
In September 2025, RRQ, together with 7Sins, announced their participation in the first season of Delta Force National Championship (DFNC) for both PC and Mobile category under the name of RRQx7Sins (short: RRQx7S). RRQ later swept both categories in a dominant fashion, with the PC category additionally setting the unbeaten record with 18–0 record. The victory on PC category books RRQx7S slot to Delta Force Invitational (DFI) Warfare 2025 that was held in Vietnam as the sole Indonesian representative. However, RRQx7S ends their run in lower bracket quarterfinals with defeat to home team, Rapid Lofi 1–2. RRQx7S finished their campaign in 5th/6th place.

==== Return as RRQ ====
In March 2026, RRQ returned to DFNC under the name RRQ by taking 7Sins player to the competition. They won season 2 in PC division without conceding a single round in the process, extending their 18-0 record from 2025 to 30-0. Their victory earns themselves the rights to represent Indonesia in Pan-Pacific Warfare Cup (PWC) 2026, where they won the whole thing after beating Toxido Esports, defending world champion of DFI Warfare 2025, from Thailand 2-1 in April 19, 2026 and earn the rights to represent Pacific region in DFI Warfare 2026 in Wuhan, China by finishing top three in the event, after sweep whole group B the day before with 4-0 record. They accompanied Toxido and AHR from Taiwan as Pacific teams qualified in the tournament. According to their coach and analyst, Pascal Setya "SnowyBun" Kusuma, the sudden rapid improvement of the team come from their learning process in previous DFI.

RRQ Mobile Warfare divisions also successfully wins back-to-back DFNC, following the PC division legacy with an unbeaten season 2 with the total round score of 12-0 after beating Alter Ego x Elite with 2-0 score in the grand finals, the same opponent they had beaten last season.

=== Tournament history ===
Updated as of 2026 season

RRQ PC
Year		National Championship (PC)							Pan-Pacific Warfare	Invitational Warfare
Year		G	W	D	L	MW	Seed	Playoffs	Pan-Pacific Warfare	Invitational Warfare
2025	Season 1	7	7	0	0	14-0	1st	1st place 2–0; REVKCG	Not held	5th-6th place 1-2; Rapid Lofi
2026	Season 2	3	3	0	0	6-0	1st Group A	1st place 2–0; Valhalla	1st place 2-1; Toxido Esports	3rd place 1-2; Team HAN
2026	Season 3	No Group Stage						2nd place 2–3; Toxido Esports	1st place 2-1; Toxido Esports	3rd place 1-2; Team HAN
RRQ Mobile
Year		National Championship (Mobile)							Pan-Pacific Warfare	Invitational Warfare
Year		G	W	D	L	MW	Seed	Playoffs	Pan-Pacific Warfare	Invitational Warfare
2025	Season 1	7	5	2	0	12-2	2nd	1st place 2–1; AExELITE	Not held	
2026	Season 2	3	3	0	0	6-0	1st Group C	1st place 2-0; Alter Ego x Elite	Not held	

=== Honours ===
Indonesia RRQ PC
Tournament	Champions	Runners-up	Finals	Season won	Season runners-up	Best results
National Championship	2	1	3	S1, S2	S3	Champions
Pan Pacific Warfare Cup	1	0	1	2026	-	Champions
Invitational Warfare	0	0	0	-	-	3rd place
Indonesia RRQ Mobile
Tournament	Champions	Runners-up	Finals	Season won	Season runners-up	Best results
National Championship	2	0	2	S1, S2	-	Champions

== Honor of Kings ==
=== History ===
RRQ entered the Honor of Kings competitive scene in May 2024 as one of the teams invited to participate in the Honor of Kings Invitational 2024 Season 2 tournament.

=== Tournament history ===
Updated as of HOK 2026 Season

RRQ
Year		Indonesia Kings Laga								World Cup	International Championship
Year		G	W	L	MW	W-L%	MW-ML%	Seed	Playoffs	World Cup	International Championship
2025	Spring	13	5	8	14–18	.385	.438	3rd Tyrant	4th place 1–3; Kagendra	Did not qualify	13th-16th place 2-3; Kagendra
2025	Fall	13	10	3	22–11	.769	.667	2nd Tyrant	5th-6th place 0-2; Dominator	Did not qualify	13th-16th place 2-3; Kagendra
2026	Spring	9	5	4	20–16	.556	.556	6th	5th-6th place 3-4; Dominator by Nemesis	Did not qualify	Qualified
2026	Fall	9	7	2	25-9	.778	.735	2nd	4th place 0–4; Bigetron by Vitality	Did not qualify	Qualified
All-time stats		44	27	17	81–54	.614	.600	–	0 IKL titles	0 KWC titles	0 KIC titles

== Valorant ==
=== History ===
==== Establishment ====
RRQ announced that they would join Valorant competitive scene on 8 August, 2020 by moving former Point Blank roster and taking former Counter-Strike: Global Offensive (CS:GO) players from their own organization to establish RRQ Endeavour. Their first competitor was Garuda Valorant Invitational, and they finished last in their group. Few months later in January 2021, RRQ released one of their players, Albert "frostmisty" Giovanni, replace it by signed Rivaldyn "Valdyn" Nafian from ONIC Esports and Muhammad Adrian "adrnking" S from BOOM Esports. Valdyn was later released after playing just two months with the team and replaced with former Bigetron Esports CS:GO player, Dave "maez" Christopher.

==== Forming the Filipino roster ====
In January 2022, RRQ unveiled an all-Filipino roster to compete in Valorant Champions Tour (VCT) Philippines season, consisting of former SV Empire Mikko "Hemsyxx" Gumapac, former Oasis Gaming Trixtan "Tr1x" Viray, former DR Esports duo of Kelly "kellyS" Sedillo and Francis Danison "Rabbet" Buñag, former Zeal Esports Vince “Flash” Medado and rookie Dustin Kurt "skadooskurt" Dollente. According to their manager at that time, Lan "Kingmaker" Rigates, the roster was initially leaked and it was relatively a "good experience". The roster managed to win Predator League 2022 Philippines in September after beating South Bull Esports (SBE) in a convincing 2-0 result.

Few days later after the win, RRQ, alongside Team Secret, was selected as the partnership team for the Filipino representative for the all-new VCT Pacific league, joining Paper Rex, Gen.G, DRX, T1, ZETA Division, DetonatioN FocusMe, Global Esports and Talon Esports.

==== VCT Pacific era ====
===== 2023 =====
As the 2023 approach, RRQ announced that they would keep the Filipino core by taking former Bren Esports player Eroll Jule “EJAY” Delfin, followed by returnees Nathaniel “Nexi” Cabero, James “2ge” Goopio, Emmanuel “Emman” Morales, and Kelly “kellyS” Sedillo. The roster was finalized by signing former BOOM Esports player and sole Indonesian representative in the roster, David Sean "tehbotoL" Michael Monangin who participate in Valorant Champions 2022 with his old team and former head coach of ONIC Esports, Martin "Ewok" from South Africa.

Their LOCK//IN 2023 roster was revealed by adding Saibani "fl1pzjder" Rahmad and Hagai Kristen "Lmemore" Yesyurun Tewuh, and four core players were kept except Nexi and kellyS who has been released earlier. They ended their journey early in round one after losing to FUT Esports 0-2. RRQ finished seventh in the league and did not qualify for the playoffs, thus ending their journey to qualify for Masters Tokyo. They proceeded to the Last Chance Qualifier for the last ticket for Champions 2023. However, their 2023 season end in a heartbreaking defeat to Gen.G 1-2 on lower bracket semifinals. Emman left the team in September after spending a few months on the team.

===== 2024 =====
In the 2024 season, RRQ replaced Emman with Russian duelist from SCARZ, Maksim "Jemkin" Batorov to extend the firepower of the team. It was become a hot topic for few weeks of speculation around the media as the team prepare to pushing their limits in VCT Pacific. They also added Korean in-game leader (IGL), Park "Estrella" Geon and the rival such as Paper Rex has dubbed RRQ as the dark horse for the 2024 season. However, recent additions didn't convert into positive results as they yet to qualify to internationals on merit with disappointing stage one performance by finished fourth in Group Omega, one spot short of playoffs.

After a bad first stage, they acquired former ONIC Esports and Paper Rex duelist from Indonesia, Cahya "monyet" Nugraha after he was allowed to negotiate with other teams thanks to Paper Rex's permission because of Wang "Jinggg" Jing Jie's return to the roster. Few days later, 2ge departed from the team to join Team Secret and reunited with fellow Filipino teammates. The team shows massive improvement by manage to qualify to the playoffs for the first time but their 2024 season ended in play-in loss against Gen.G, champion of Masters Shanghai, once again. Lmemore and fl1pzdjer were released after almost two years playing with RRQ.

===== 2025 =====
As the 2025 season approached, RRQ signed Alter Ego Esports initiator prodigy, Bryan Carlos "Kush" Setiawan with the roster announcement featuring RRQ MLBB player cameo, Schevenko David "Skylar" Tendean. They also added former Team Secret coach, Evan "Warbirds" Olzem from the United States as the assistant coach. After yet another disappointing result in Kickoff, RRQ replaced their IGL with former BLEED Esports Vietnamese player, Ngô "crazyguy" Công Anh before stage one, and released Estrella from the active roster.

The transfer paid off as RRQ led Group Omega and following BOOM Esports in Group Alpha as both Indonesian teams finished top of their respective groups. The consistency followed by the upset against all odds after RRQ ended Paper Rex's cinderella story 3-2 in lower bracket finals and take Gen.G down 3-1 in the finals, ending 3 years hope of Indonesian team to become the second Southeast Asia team, after Paper Rex themselves, and first for Indonesia to win VCT. The win secures RRQ to Esports World Cup direct slot and Masters Toronto as number one Pacific seed with immediate knockout round starting point. Their international debut didn't go as plan for the first Pacific seed as they got kicked out early after two consecutive playoffs lost against Wolves Esports from China (0-2) in upper bracket quarterfinal and Fnatic from EMEA in lower bracket (1-2).

The league form continued in Stage 2 as they finished second in Group Alpha and booked the upper bracket quarterfinals slot as second seed. Even though they got kicked to the lower bracket after the loss to T1, they resurged with three straight lower bracket victories, all on Korean teams (Gen.G, Nongshim RedForce and T1) to guarantee their 2025 Valorant Champions slot as Pacific representative by points system. The final slot was eventually taken by DRX after RRQ sends Talon home in a reverse sweep fashion 3-2 and jump RRQ as guaranteed first or second seed in Champions as the grand finalist of stage 2. However, RRQ lost 1-3 in the grand final to fan favorite Paper Rex and guaranteed themselves as the second seed for Champions.

Their debut in Champions did not go as they wanted after taking a one-sided lost game against Fnatic 0-2 in group B. Their hopes was restored after taking down Bilibili Gaming in a close 2-1 game and becomes first Indonesian team to win a match in Champions. Their journey ended after a lost to Made in Brazil (MIBR) 0-2 and bowed out from the tournament with 1-2 record. The head coach, Marthineus "Ewok" van der Walt steps down the role after carrying RRQ for three years in October.

=== Tournament history ===
Updated as of Valorant Champions Tour 2026

==== Valorant Champions Tour – Pacific League (2023–2026) ====
RRQ Valorant
Year	VCT Pacific								Masters 1	Masters 2	Champions
Year	Competition	G	W	L	Map W–L	Round W–L	Seed	Playoffs	Masters 1	Masters 2	Champions
2023	League	9	4	5	10–11	208–221	7th	Did not qualify	LOCK//IN São Paulo; 17th–32th place 0–2; FUT Esports	Masters Tokyo; Did not qualify	Champions Los Angeles; Did not qualify
2024	Kickoff	2	0	2	2–4	63–73	3rd Group C	Did not qualify	Masters Madrid; Did not qualify	Masters Shanghai; Did not qualify	Champions Seoul; Did not qualify
2024	Stage 1	5	3	2	6–6	116–128	4th Group Omega	Did not qualify	Masters Madrid; Did not qualify	Masters Shanghai; Did not qualify	Champions Seoul; Did not qualify
2024	Stage 2	5	3	2	8–4	148–135	2nd Group Omega	5th–6th place 0–2; Gen.G Esports	Masters Madrid; Did not qualify	Masters Shanghai; Did not qualify	Champions Seoul; Did not qualify
2025	Kickoff	No Group Stage						7th–8th place 1–2; Nongshim RedForce	Masters Bangkok; Did not qualify	Masters Toronto; 7th–8th place 1–2; Fnatic	Champions Paris; 9th–12th place Group Stage; 1–2
2025	Stage 1	5	3	2	8–5	148–126	1st Group Omega	1st place 3–1; Gen.G Esports	Masters Bangkok; Did not qualify	Masters Toronto; 7th–8th place 1–2; Fnatic	Champions Paris; 9th–12th place Group Stage; 1–2
2025	Stage 2	5	3	2	6–7	139–129	2nd Group Alpha	2nd place 1–3; Paper Rex	Masters Bangkok; Did not qualify	Masters Toronto; 7th–8th place 1–2; Fnatic	Champions Paris; 9th–12th place Group Stage; 1–2
2026	Kickoff	No Group Stage						4th place 1–3; Paper Rex	Masters Santiago; Did not qualify	Masters London; Did not qualify	Champions Shanghai; Did not qualify
2026	Stage 1	5	4	1	8-5	154-141	2nd Group Omega	5th-6th place 1–2; T1	Masters Santiago; Did not qualify	Masters London; Did not qualify	Champions Shanghai; Did not qualify
2026	Stage 2	5	2	3	5-9	134-153	5th Group Alpha	Did not qualify	Masters Santiago; Did not qualify	Masters London; Did not qualify	Champions Shanghai; Did not qualify

== Performance in Esports World Cup (EWC) ==
=== History ===
In March 2025, RRQ was officially selected as one of 40 esports organizations worldwide to join the Esports World Cup Foundation's (EWCF) Club Partner Program. This initiative aims to support the growth and sustainability of top-tier esports clubs by providing financial assistance and resources to enhance their operations and global reach. They finished in 27th place, but were eligible to earn the share prize pool money and ranking (joint 20th) after having two divisions (MLBB and Free Fire) finish in the Top 8 and other clubs did not meet the requirements.

In late March 2026, RRQ again was selected as one of the 40 esports organization worldwide to join the EWCF Club Foundation. They become one of the four Southeast Asia clubs that joined the 2026 foundation alongside fellow Indonesian organization ONIC Esports, Team Secret (based in the Philippines) and GAM Esports (based in Vietnam).

=== Results ===
Updated as of EWC 2026

Key – result
Colour	Meaning
Gold	Winner
Silver	Second place
Bronze	Third place or equivalent
Green	Other points position
Blue	Other classified position
Red	Did not qualify (DNQ)
White	Did not enter (DNE)
Tan	Game not featured

Key – team status
Colour	Meaning
Light green	Active
Light pink	Disbanded

Key – symbols
Symbol	Meaning
†	Not eligible for EWC points

RRQ performance by game
Game		Team	2024	2025	2026
Apex Legends		RRQ	DNE	DNE	10
Free Fire		RRQ Kazu	7	2	9
Honor of Kings		RRQ	DNQ	DNQ	DNQ
Mobile Legends: Bang Bang	Men's	RRQ Hoshi	DNQ	5–8	DNQ
Mobile Legends: Bang Bang	Men's	RRQ Tora	DNE	DNE	DNQ
Mobile Legends: Bang Bang	Men's	RRQ Akira	13–16	DNE	DNE
Mobile Legends: Bang Bang	Women's	RRQ Mika	DNQ	DNE	DNE
Mobile Legends: Bang Bang	Women's	RRQ Shira	DNE	DNE	DNQ
PUBG Mobile		RRQ Ryu	DNQ	DNQ	23
Street Fighter 6		RRQ	DNE	DNQ	DNQ
Teamfight Tactics		RRQ	DNE	DNQ	DNQ
Tekken 8		RRQ	DNE	25–32	DNQ
Trackmania		RRQ	N/A	N/A	25-28
Valorant		RRQ	N/A	9–12	13-16
Total points			40	950	0

== Rest of the rosters ==
As on 30 March 2026

RRQ rosters

Apex Legends
Handle	Name	Nationality
StrafingFlame	Gen Ghi Subroto	Indonesia
Prycryy	Dylan Price	Australia
EzFlash	Muamar Fahri Abrar	Indonesia

Teamfight Tactics
Handle	Name	Nationality
Asta1	Hoàng Xuân Sơn	Vietnam
MIDFEED	Nguyễn Thế Dự	Vietnam
pk1	Trần Hồng Trường	Vietnam
YBY1	Bùi Tuấn Kiên	Vietnam

Tekken 8
Handle	Name	Nationality
JDCR	Kim Hyun-Jin	South Korea

Free Fire Kazu
Handle	Name	Nationality
Dutzz	Wira Gunawan	Indonesia
Abay	Aby Siliwangi Jaya Kusuma	Indonesia
18DeerMKS	M Haidir Ali	Indonesia
MaaL	Abdullah Kamal Hasibuan	Indonesia

PUBG Mobile RYU
Handle	Name	Nationality
Nerpehko	Yoga Malik Rahman	Indonesia
GenFos	Genta Effendi	Indonesia
LAPAR	Tengku Muhammad Septiadi Ardiansyah	Indonesia
Firen	Satria Amarta	Indonesia

Honor of Kings
Handle	Name	Nationality
ZenShao	Cheng Wei Han	Malaysia
SirDumb	Muh Naufal Aushaf Mahfudz	Indonesia
Gaoki	Mochammad Imam Charomain	Indonesia
Lexx	Phang Alex Vincentus	Indonesia
Harpist	Agus Prasetyo	Indonesia
XInglin	Mou Haoran	China

Valorant
Handle	Name	Nationality
Xffero	David Sean Michael Monangin	Indonesia
Kushy	Bryan Carlos Setiawan	Indonesia
crazyguy	Ngo Cong Anh	Vietnam
Jemkin	Maksim Batorov	Russia
Monyet	I Made Adhi Cahya Nugraha	Indonesia

Delta Force Operations PC
Handle	Name	Nationality
Bion	Abi Faisal	Indonesia
NAFTAL	Glenn Naftali	Indonesia
Xavy	Agung	Indonesia
dumdum	Ridwan Syah Putra	Indonesia
Ditraya	Adrian Fajri	Indonesia
NYSM	Effendy	Indonesia
Petruk	Gal	Indonesia
Zee	N/A	Indonesia

eFootball PC/Console
Handle	Name	Nationality
Elgacor	Elga Cahya Putra	Indonesia
binongboys	Rizky Faidan	Indonesia

eFootball Mobile
Handle	Name	Nationality
Radinka	Radinka Wiratama	Indonesia
Hudaaa	Huda Yuliviar Ammar	Indonesia

Legend:
- (I) Inactive
- (S) Suspended
- (L) On loan
- (2W) Two-way player
- Substitute
- (injured) Injury / Illness

== Notes ==
Awards and achievements
Preceded by Team NXL; EVOS Legends; Themselves; ONIC Esports	MPL Indonesia winner 2018 – Season 2; 2020 – Season 5; 2020 – Season 6; 2022 – Season 9	Succeeded by ONIC Esports; Themselves; EVOS Legends; ONIC Esports
Preceded by RED Canids; Themselves; Themselves; Themselves	MPL Brazil winner 2022 – Season 2; 2023 – Season 3; 2023 – Season 4; 2024 – Season 5	Succeeded by Themselves; Themselves; Themselves defunct
Preceded by RED Canids; Themselves	Liga LATAM winner 2022 – Season 2; 2023 – Season 3	Succeeded by Themselves defunct
Preceded by Inaugural	MPL LATAM winner 2024 – Season 1	Succeeded by Maycam Evolve
Preceded by Geek Fam ID Jr	MDL Indonesia winner 2024 – Season 10	Succeeded by Alter Ego X
Preceded by ECHO Proud	MDL Philippines winner 2024 – Season 3	Succeeded by Lazy Esports
Preceded by DRX	VCT Pacific winner 2025 – Stage 1	Succeeded by Paper Rex
Preceded by Inaugural; Themselves	Delta Force National Championship winner 2025 - Season 1 (PC); 2026 - Season 2 (PC)	Succeeded by Themselves; TBD
Preceded by Inaugural; Themselves	Delta Force National Championship winner 2025 - Season 1 (Mobile); 2026 - Season 2 (Mobile)	Succeeded by Themselves; TBD
Preceded by Inaugural	Pan-Pacific Warfare Cup winner 2026	Succeeded by TBD
