= Free Fire (video game) =

2017 multiplayer online battle royale game

- Developers: Garena
- Publisher: Garena
- Engine: Unity
- Platforms: Android iOS iPadOS
- Release: 8 December 2017
- Genre: Battle royale
- Mode: Multiplayer

Free Fire, formerly known as Garena Free Fire, is a free-to-play battle royale game developed and published by Garena for Android and iOS. Released on December 8, 2017, the game gained widespread popularity, becoming the most downloaded mobile game globally in 2019. By 2021, it had over 150 million daily active users and surpassed $1 billion in lifetime revenue. As of February 2024, Free Fire had 100 million active users.

In September 2021, Garena launched Free Fire Max, an enhanced version featuring improved graphics, lighting, and sound effects. The game’s official annual esports competition, the Free Fire World Series, set a record as the most-watched esports event at the time, reaching over 5.4 million peak live viewers.

== Gameplay ==
In Free Fire, players control a character in a third-person perspective. The fire button allows them to shoot and throw items. The character can perform actions such as jumping, crawling, and lying down. During gameplay, players can utilize the "Gloo Wall" grenade as a form of cover to protect against damage.

=== Game modes ===
Free Fire offers over 15 game modes, including Team Deathmatch, Clash Squad, Big Head, Explosive Jump, Cold Steel, Zombie Hunt, Rampage, and Pet Mania. However, modes other than Battle Royale, Clash Squad, and Lone Wolf are only available during special events.

The Battle Royale mode in Free Fire accommodates up to 52 players landing on an island without weapons. They must fight to be the last one standing by scavenging weapons and equipment from buildings. Playing this mode in ranked mode will affect their ranking. There are 6 maps to choose from: Bermuda, Bermuda Remastered, Kalahari, Purgatory, Alpine, and NeXTerra. The mode allows for solo, duo, or squad play.

Clash Squad is a 4-player versus 4-player mode where players purchase weapons and items from an in-game shop during preparation time, then engage in combat against the opposing team. The mode is played in a best-of-7 format, lasting anywhere from 4 to 7 rounds. Each round is won when all players from one team are killed, either by their opponents or through environmental factors. As of 2022, the maps used in Clash Squad are the same as those in Battle Royale mode. The mode can be played as either Ranked or Casual.

Lone Wolf is a variation of the Clash Squad mode that can be played as either a 1-player versus 1-player or 2-player versus 2-player "duo" format with more intricate rules. In each round, both sides have the opportunity to select their equipment for the next 2 rounds. The game is played in a best-of-5 format. If both teams have won 4 rounds each, a final round begins with both sides able to choose any weapon they prefer. All players are automatically equipped with basic items such as a vest and helmet from the start of the round. This mode takes place on its own map known as Iron Dome.

Free Fire Craftland editor

Craftland allows players to design their own maps in Free Fire using an in-game builder tool. The maps created can be shared and played with others. Craftland also supports script editing for advanced customization, giving creators greater freedom to bring their ideas to life. Players can add buildings, gameplay elements, and decorations to the map until they reach the maximum space limit. There are two maps available for players to use as the base for their designs.

=== Craftland Studio ===
Craftland Studio is an expanded game-creation toolkit for Garena Free Fire, allowing players to develop and publish custom gameplay experiences within the game. In addition to the mobile-based map editor, the PC version provides more advanced development tools, including a visual logic editor, terrain editing tools, script editing and customisable game modules. Garena describes each Craftland map as hosting a new game, allowing creators to modify gameplay settings, construct environments and implement custom game mechanics.

The PC toolkit includes tools for scene editing, scripting, user-interface customisation and animation controllers. Creators can use block-based scripts and programming tools to implement gameplay logic, while the scene editor provides options for constructing and arranging environments. The platform also provides an Asset Store for sharing and reusing community-created resources and a Creator Center for managing and publishing projects.

In September 2026, version 1.19.0 introduced integrated artificial intelligence features through AI Smith, a conversational assistant within the editor. The update also added support for Model Context Protocol (MCP) extensions, enabling external tools to interact with editor functions, including blocks, scripts, scenes, user interfaces and animation controllers. Other additions included improvements to the scene, script and user-interface editors, as well as expanded animation and asset-management features.

=== Character system ===
Free Fire character system

Free Fire features a character system of 50+ characters. Each character has a unique skill which can be active or passive. Active skills can be triggered manually by an in-game button and passive skills are triggered automatically. Each character can equip 4 skills including the character's skill and 3 skills from other characters (one active skill and three passive skills can be equipped by a single character). Free Fire characters have unique backstories. A few of these characters were inspired by real-life celebrities whom Free Fire had collaborations with, such as Chrono from the collaboration with Cristiano Ronaldo, Dimitri & Thiva from the collaboration with Dimitri Vegas & Like Mike, A-Patroa from the collaboration with Anitta, Alok from the collaboration with DJ Alok and JBeibs from the collaboration with Justin Bieber. In the game, it is possible to acquire all characters by using gold, an in-game currency that can be earned through gameplay and event participation, or with Diamonds which can be bought with real-world currency.

=== Pet System ===
In Free Fire, pets can provide support to players during fights. Each pet has a special ability that provides additional support during gameplay. Players can equip pet abilities independently of their pets' appearances, allowing them to customise their combinations. One of the pets in the game, Poring, was added as part of a collaboration with Ragnarok Online. Players can also customise their pets with skins and emotes. As of 2026, the game features 27 different pets that players can choose to bring into battle.

=== Ranking System ===
In Free Fire, a seven-tier ranking system, including sub-tiers like Bronze I, II, III, categorizes players by skill and performance. Players earn ranking points based on kills, damage, survival time and standing position, progressing from Bronze to Grandmaster. Seasons reset ranks (e.g., from Silver III to Bronze I or II). There are two ranked modes: Battle Royale rank mode and Clash Squad rank mode.

== Premise ==
Free Fire's premise is detailed in animated shorts and other materials published by Garena to promote the game. Free Fire Universe is the universe where the game, comics and stories take place. Each character has a different story and a family background and characters are connected to each other. There are three cities in the universe, called La Luna, Griza, and New Dawn where the characters live. Characters are divided into two factions: the Horizon and the Mambas. The Horizon is the ruling faction of the city where the rich and powerful people are while the Mambas are a liberation group against the Horizon. In 2022 Free Fire released the first short film, "How to Start a Fire", which featured the character Hayato Yagami.

== Reception ==
Logo (2017-2022)

The graphics were described as having "a benefit for mid- and low-specification phones", but a reviewer stated that "if games with good graphics are your thing then we don't recommend that you play Free Fire Battlegrounds. But if you like battle royale games and want to have fun with your friends, you should definitely play."

Tais Carvalho of Techtudo commented that Free Fire "prioritizes performance, making it a great choice for any type of device. The gameplay stands out and has enough content to entertain and offer rewarding combat." Regarding the progression of characters and skills, she said it is "a flashy add-on".

In the Google Play annual list of "Best Apps of the Year", Free Fire won in the "Best Popular Vote Game" category of 2019, being the most publicly voted in Brazil and in Thailand.

Garena Free Fire is one of the most popular battle royale mobile games, behind PUBG Mobile, Fortnite Battle Royale and Call of Duty: Mobile. It is particularly popular in Latin America, India and Southeast Asia. Free Fire was the fourth most downloaded game on the Google Play Store in the fourth quarter of 2018, and was the fourth most downloaded game worldwide in 2018 on iOS and the Google Play Store together. The title earned approximately 182 million downloads in 2018, making it the second most downloaded battle royale mobile game (above Fortnite Battle Royale and behind only PUBG Mobile), and grossed approximately $19.3 million in monthly revenues through December 2018, becoming a significant financial success for Garena. As of August 2021, Garena Free Fire has more than one billion downloads on the Google Play Store.

At the end of Q1 2021, Free Fire surpassed PUBG Mobile in revenues in the United States, generating $100 million in turnover as compared to PUBG Mobile's $68 million. Free Fire's revenues jumped by 4.5 times as compared to the same period in the previous year.

By November 2019, Free Fire had grossed over $1 billion worldwide. It went on to become the fourth highest-grossing video game of 2020 with $2.13 billion, and then the eighth highest-grossing mobile game of 2021 with $1.2 billion, for a total of at least $4.33 billion grossed as of 2021.

In 2020 and 2021, Free Fire won the Esports Mobile Game of the Year award at the Esports Awards.

Free Fire World Series 2021 became the most viewed E-sport tournament of all time with a peak concurrent online viewership of more than 5.4 million, until it was surpassed by the League of Legends event in 2024.

== Esports ==
=== Free Fire World Series ===
Free Fire began the Free Fire World Series (FFWS) esports competition in 2019. In 2020, FFWS was replaced by a series of regional events, the "Free Fire Continental Series" (FFCS), due to the COVID-19 pandemic. In February 2021, Garena announced the Free Fire World Series (FFWS) with a $2 million prize pool.

In 2021, the Free Fire World Series became the most-watched esports event in history with over 5.4 million peak live viewers, surpassing the 2022 League of Legends World Championship which had 5.1 million peak viewers.

=== Regional events ===
The "EMEA Invitational" was a replacement for the Free Fire World Series in 2021 for Europe, the Middle East and Africa. This championship featured a total of 12 teams. With a prize pool of USD 200,000.

The Free Fire Asia Championship was a replacement for the Free Fire World Series in 2021 for Asia. This championship featured a total of 31 teams from Vietnam, Indonesia, Thailand, India, Taiwan, and MCP (Malaysia, Cambodia, and Pakistan). The teams compete for a prize pool of USD 400,000.

The Liga Brasileira de Free Fire (LBFF) is the main Free Fire esports event in Brazil. Comprising 3 divisions, Series A, B, and C, it is played in two stages a year, with the elite qualifying for the Free Fire World Series.

== Free Fire Max ==
Free Fire Max is an enhanced version of Free Fire that was released in 2021. It features improved High-Definition graphics, sound effects, and a 360-degree rotatable lobby. Players can use the same account to play both Free Fire Max and Free Fire, and in-game purchases, costumes, and items are synced between the two games. Both games are connected with FireLink technology, which allows players from both games to play together simultaneously. In February 2022, the Government of India banned Free Fire for security reasons, alleging a connection to China, but Free Fire Max remained available in the country.

== = Collaborations ==
Collaboration with other popular franchises is a major marketing strategy used to promote the game. Since its launch, Free Fire has collaborated with popular video games, celebrities, TV shows and films. Free Fire has two types of collaborations which are global and regional. Unlike global collaborations, regional collaborations are only available to players from specific regions. In 2022, Free Fire collaborated with singer Justin Bieber and debuted his song "Beautiful Love" in Free Fire.

Free Fire global collaborations list
Year	Collaboration	Ref.
2019	Alok	
2020	Ragnarok Online	
2020	Hrithik Roshan	
2020	Kshmr	
2020	La Casa de Papel (Money Heist)	
2020	Cristiano Ronaldo	
2021	Son Tung M-TP	
2021	One-Punch Man	
2021	Attack on Titan	
2021	Street Fighter V	
2021	McLaren	
2021	Venom: Let There Be Carnage	
2021	Dimitri Vegas & Like Mike	
2022	Assassin's Creed	
2022	BTS	
2022	Justin Bieber	
2023	Devil May Cry 5	
2023	Spider-Man: Across the Spider-Verse	
2023	Demon Slayer: Kimetsu no Yaiba	
2023	Lamborghini	
2024	Blue Lock	
2024	Pushpa 2: The Rule (regional, India)	
2025	Naruto	
2025	Squid Game	
2025	Digimon	
2026	Jujutsu Kaisen	
2026	Gintama	
2026	AAA (regional, Latin America)	
2026	Ben 10 (coming soon)	

== Anime adaptation ==
An anime adaptation co-produced by Garena and Kadokawa was announced on 13 May 2024. The project was launched through a joint investment, with Kadokawa Qingyu — Kadokawa's overseas branch, as its production manager. It will be animated by Candy Box and directed by Ken Takahashi, with Sus4 Inc. producing the music. Titled Free Fire Daybreak, the series is set to premiere in Q2 2027.

== Controversies ==
In January 2022, PUBG developer Krafton filed a lawsuit against Garena and its parent company Sea for copyright infringement. The lawsuit accused Garena of copying in-game items, game mechanics and overall look and feel of PUBG: Battlegrounds and PUBG Mobile in their games Free Fire and Free Fire Max. According to Krafton, "Free Fire and Free Fire Max extensively copy numerous aspects of Battlegrounds, both individually and in combination, including Battlegrounds' copyrighted unique game opening 'air drop' feature, the game structure and play, the combination and selection of weapons, armor, and unique objects, locations, and the overall choice of color schemes, materials, and textures." Krafton also sued Apple and Google for hosting the game as well as Youtube for hosting Free Fire gameplay videos. The lawsuit was later dropped through mutual agreement between Sea Ltd, Krafton, Apple and Google.

On 14 February 2022, the India's Ministry of Electronics and Information Technology banned Free Fire along with 53 other apps which posed a threat to India's privacy and security under Section 69A of the Information Technology Act, Constitution of India.

In October 2024, the FFWS 2024 trailer sparked controversy for depicting a character running up stairs with a "Ram Darbar" emblem printed on the stairs alongside various cultural elements from other countries. The placement of the emblem on the stairs was perceived as disrespectful to Hindu deity Rama. This led to backlash in India and Indonesia, with demands for an apology from Garena. The original trailer was removed, and an edited version was uploaded to Free Fire's Malaysian YouTube channel.
