= 2025 in esports =

This topic lists the esports events for the 2025 year.

If tournaments are held entirely online, it is denoted in the list below. For those tournaments that are held either partially or entirely offline, the host city that hosts the Grand Final is indicated last, if there are multiple host cities.

== Apex Legends ==
Tournament	Host city	Duration	Champion	Runner-up	Ref.
ALGS: 2024 Championship	(Japan) Sapporo	January 29 – February 2	GoNext Esports	Alliance	
ALGS: 2025 Open	(United States) New Orleans	May 1–4	Team Falcons	Alliance	
Esports World Cup 2025	(Saudi Arabia) Riyadh	July 10–13	VK Gaming	ROC Esports	

== Call of Duty: Black Ops 6 ==
Tournament	Host city	Duration	Champion	Runner-up	Ref.
CDL 2025 Stage 1 Major	(Spain) Madrid	January 30 – February 2	Atlanta FaZe	Los Angeles Thieves	
CDL 2025 Stage 2 Major	(United States) Allen	March 20–23	Atlanta FaZe	Vancouver Surge	
CDL 2025 Stage 3 Major	(United States) Boca Raton	April 24–27	Los Angeles Thieves	Vancouver Surge	
CDL 2025 Stage 4 Major	(United States) Dallas	May 23–25	Los Angeles Thieves	Atlanta Faze	
CDL 2025 Championship	(Canada) Kitchener	June 26–29	OpTic Texas	Vancouver Surge	
Esports World Cup 2025	(Saudi Arabia) Riyadh	July 24–27	OpTic Gaming	Vancouver Surge	

== Chess ==
Tournament	Host city	Duration	Champion	Runner-up	Ref.
Chessable Masters	Online	February 16–21	(Norway) Magnus Carlsen	(United States) Hikaru Nakamura	
Chess.com Classic	Online	May 18–23	(Norway) Magnus Carlsen	(France) Maxime Vachier-Lagrave	
Road to EWC DreamHack	(United States) Dallas	May 23–25	(Ukraine) Olexandr Bortnyk	(Serbia) Alexey Sarana	
Hyperbullet Championship	Online	June 12–13	(United States) Andrew Tang	(United States) Daniel Naroditsky	
Bullet Chess Championship 2025	Online	June 23–28	(France) Alireza Firouzja	(Ukraine) Olexandr Bortnyk	
Esports World Cup 2025	(Saudi Arabia) Riyadh	July 29 – August 1	(Norway) Magnus Carlsen	(France) Alireza Firouzja	
Comet Open	Online	October 11–19	(United States) Hikaru Nakamura	Denis Lazavik	

== Counter-Strike 2 ==
Tournament	Host city	Duration	Champion	Runner-up	Ref.
BLAST Bounty Spring 2025	(Denmark) Copenhagen	January 23–26	Team Spirit	Eternal Fire	
Intel Extreme Masters Katowice 2025	(Poland) Katowice	January 29 – February 9	Team Vitality	Team Spirit	
PGL Cluj-Napoca 2025	(Romania) Cluj-Napoca	February 14–23	MOUZ	Team Falcons	
ESL Pro League Season 21	(Sweden) Stockholm	March 1–16	Team Vitality	MOUZ	
BLAST Open Spring 2025	(Portugal) Lisbon	March 19–30	Team Vitality	MOUZ	
PGL Bucharest 2025	(Romania) Bucharest	April 6–13	Team Falcons	G2 Esports	
Intel Extreme Masters Melbourne 2025	(Australia) Melbourne	April 21–27	Team Vitality	Team Falcons	
BLAST Rivals Spring 2025	(Denmark) Copenhagen	April 30 – May 4	Team Vitality	Team Falcons	
PGL Astana 2025	(Kazakhstan) Astana	May 10–18	Team Spirit	Astralis	
Intel Extreme Masters Dallas 2025	(United States) Dallas	May 19–25	Team Vitality	MOUZ	
BLAST.tv Austin Major 2025	(United States) Austin	June 3–22	Team Vitality	The MongolZ	
FISSURE Playground 1	(Serbia) Belgrade	July 15–20	TYLOO	Astralis	
Intel Extreme Masters Cologne 2025	(Germany) Cologne	July 23 – August 3	Team Spirit	MOUZ	
BLAST Bounty Fall 2025	Malta	August 14–17	Team Spirit	The MongolZ	
Esports World Cup 2025	(Saudi Arabia) Riyadh	August 20–25	The MongolZ	Aurora Gaming	
BLAST Open Fall 2025	(United Kingdom) London	August 27 – September 7	G2 Esports	Team Vitality	
FISSURE Playground 2	(Serbia) Belgrade	September 12–21	FURIA	The MongolZ	
StarLadder StarSeries Fall 2025	(Hungary) Budapest	September 18–21	Natus Vincere	Ninjas in Pyjamas	
ESL Pro League Season 22	(Sweden) Stockholm	September 28 – October 12	Team Vitality	Team Falcons	
CS Asia Championships 2025	(China) Shanghai	October 14–19	Legacy	3DMAX	
Thunderpick World Championship 2025	Malta	October 15–19	FURIA	Natus Vincere	
PGL Masters Bucharest 2025	(Romania) Bucharest	October 26 – November 1	Aurora Gaming	Legacy	
Intel Extreme Masters Chengdu 2025	(China) Chengdu	November 3–9	FURIA	Team Vitality	
BLAST Rivals Fall 2025	Hong Kong	November 12–16	FURIA	Team Falcons	
StarLadder Budapest Major 2025	(Hungary) Budapest	November 24 – December 14	Team Vitality	FaZe Clan	

== Dota 2 ==
Tournament	Host city	Duration	Champion	Runner-up	Ref.
Fissure Playground 1	(Serbia) Belgrade	January 24 – February 2	Tundra Esports	Team Falcons	
BLAST Slam II	(Denmark) Copenhagen	February 4–9	Tundra Esports	Gaimin Gladiators	
PGL Wallachia Season 3	(Romania) Bucharest	March 8–16	Team Liquid	Tundra Esports	
ESL One Raleigh 2025	(United States) Raleigh	April 7–13	PARIVISION	Team Spirit	
PGL Wallachia Season 4	(Romania) Bucharest	April 19–27	Team Liquid	PARIVISION	
BLAST Slam III	(Denmark) Copenhagen	May 6–11	Tundra Esports	Team Falcons	
PGL Wallachia Season 5	(Romania) Bucharest	June 18–29	BetBoom Team	Gaimin Gladiators	
Esports World Cup 2025	(Saudi Arabia) Riyadh	July 8–19	Team Spirit	Team Falcons	
The International 2025	(Germany) Hamburg	September 4–14	Team Falcons	Xtreme Gaming	
BLAST Slam IV	Singapore	October 14 – November 9	Tundra Esports	Team Falcons	
Fissure Playground 2	(Serbia) Belgrade	October 23 – November 2	Team Falcons	BetBoom Team	
PGL Wallachia Season 6	(Romania) Bucharest	November 15–23	MOUZ	Team Spirit	
BLAST Slam V	(China) Chengdu	December 5–7	Tundra Esports	Team Yandex	

== The Finals ==
Tournament	Host city	Duration	Champion	Runner-up	Ref.
The Grand Major 2025	(Sweden) Stockholm	November 28–29	NTMR	Team Secret	

== Fortnite ==
Tournament	Host city	Duration	Champion	Runner-up	Ref.
FNCS 2025 Pro-Am	(United States) Los Angeles	May 10	(Australia) AussieAntics (United States) Peterbot	(United States) Cooper (United States) Zemie	
FNCS 2025 Global Championship	(France) Lyon	September 6–7	(Russia) SwizzY (Serbia) Queasy (Latvia) Merstach	(Ukraine) Vanyak3kk (Sweden) Pixie (Denmark) MariusCOW	

== Halo Infinite ==
Tournament	Host city	Duration	Champion	Runner-up	Ref.
HCS 2025: Arlington Major	(United States) Arlington	April 18–20	OpTic Gaming	Shopify Rebellion	
HCS 2025: Dallas Open	(United States) Dallas	May 23–25	OpTic Gaming	FaZe Clan	
HCS 2025: Salt Lake City Major	(United States) Salt Lake City	August 1–3	Shopify Rebellion	OpTic Gaming	
HCS 2025: Charlotte Major	(United States) Charlotte	October 3–5	Shopify Rebellion	FaZe Clan	
Halo World Championship 2025	(United States) Seattle	October 24–26	Shopify Rebellion	OpTic Gaming	

== League of Legends ==
Tournament	Host city	Duration	Champion	Runner-up	Ref.
2025 First Stand Tournament	(South Korea) Seoul	March 10–16	Hanwha Life Esports	Karmine Corp	
2025 Mid-Season Invitational	(Canada) Vancouver	June 27 – July 12	Gen.G	T1	
Esports World Cup 2025	(Saudi Arabia) Riyadh	July 16–20	Gen.G	Anyone's Legend	
2025 LoL World Championship	(China) Beijing (China) Shanghai (China) Chengdu	October 14 – November 9	T1	KT Rolster	

== Marvel Rivals ==
Tournament	Host city	Duration	Champion	Runner-up	Ref.
Ignite 2025 Mid-Season Finals	(China) Guangzhou	August 6–10	Rad EU	ENVY	
Ignite 2025 Grand Finals	(United States) Atlanta	October 27 – November 2	Virtus.pro	Natus Vincere	

== Mobile Legends: Bang Bang ==
Tournament	Host city	Duration	Champion	Runner-up	Ref.
MLBB Women's Invitational 2025	(Saudi Arabia) Riyadh	July 15–19	Team Vitality	Gaimin Gladiators	
MLBB Mid-Season Cup 2025	(Saudi Arabia) Riyadh	July 10 – August 2	Team Liquid PH	SRG.OG	

== Overwatch 2 ==
Tournament	Host city	Duration	Champion	Runner-up	Ref.
OWCS 2025 Champions Clash	(China) Hangzhou	April 18–20	Crazy Raccoon	Team Falcons	
OWCS 2025 Midseason Championship	(Saudi Arabia) Riyadh	July 31 – August 3	Team Falcons	Al Qadsiah	
OWCS 2025 World Finals	(Sweden) Stockholm	November 26–30	Twisted Minds	Al Qadsiah	

== PUBG: Battlegrounds ==
Tournament	Host city	Duration	Champion	Runner-up	Ref.
PUBG Global Series 7 2025	(China) Shanghai	April 28 – May 4	17Gaming	Freecs	
PUBG Global Series 8 2025	(China) Shanghai	May 12–18	BB Team	Freecs	
PUBG Nations Cup 2025	(South Korea) Seoul	July 23–27	Vietnam	China	
Esports World Cup 2025	(Saudi Arabia) Riyadh	August 12–16	Twisted Minds	Gen.G	
PUBG Global Championship 2025	(Thailand) Bangkok	November 28 – December 14	Full Sense	Virtus.pro	

== PUBG Mobile ==
Tournament	Host city	Duration	Champion	Runner-up	Ref.
PUBG Mobile Global Open 2025	(Uzbekistan) Tashkent	April 12–13	Regnum Carya Esports	Nigma Galaxy	
Peacekeeper Elite League Spring 2025	(China) Jinan	February 20 – May 18	ThunderTalk Gaming	Tianba	
PUBG Mobile World Cup 2025	(Saudi Arabia) Riyadh	July 25 – August 3	Yangon Galacticos	Weibo Gaming	
PUBG Mobile Global Championship 2025	(Thailand) Bangkok	November 24 – December 14	Alpha7 Esports	ULF Esports	

== Rocket League ==
Tournament	Host city	Duration	Champion	Runner-up	Ref.
RLCS 2025 Birmingham Major	(England) Birmingham	March 27–30	Karmine Corp	The Ultimates	
RLCS 2025 Raleigh Major	(United States) Raleigh	June 26–29	Team Falcons	Dignitas	
Esports World Cup 2025	(Saudi Arabia) Riyadh	August 14–17	Karmine Corp	Geekay Esports	
RLCS 2025 World Championship	(France) Lyon-Décines	September 9–14	NRG	Team Falcons	

== Teamfight Tactics ==
Tournament	Host city	Duration	Champion	Runner-up	Ref.
Into the Arcane Tactician's Crown	online	March 14–16	(United States) Dishsoap	(France) Jedusor	
Cyber City Tactician's Crown	online	July 11–13	(Japan) summertimer	(Hong Kong) AQ1H	
Esports World Cup 2025	(Saudi Arabia) Riyadh	August 11–15	Weibo Gaming	Virtus Pro	
TFT Paris Open	(France) Paris	December 12–14	(China) Huanmie	(China) XiaoLiLuo	

== Tom Clancy's Rainbow Six Siege ==
Tournament	Host city	Duration	Champion	Runner-up	Ref.
Six Invitational 2025	(United States) Boston	February 3–16	FaZe Clan	Team BDS	
RE:L0:AD 2025	(Brazil) Rio de Janeiro	May 8–18	FURIA	CAG Osaka	
Esports World Cup 2025	(Saudi Arabia) Riyadh	August 5–9	Team Secret	G2 Esports	
Blast R6 Fall Major 2025	(Germany) Munich	November 8–16	M80	Team Falcons	

== Valorant ==
Tournament	Host city	Duration	Champion	Runner-up	Ref.
Valorant Masters Bangkok 2025	(Thailand) Bangkok	February 20 – March 2	T1	G2 Esports	
Valorant Masters Toronto 2025	(Canada) Toronto	June 7–22	Paper Rex	Fnatic	
Esports World Cup 2025	(Saudi Arabia) Riyadh	July 8–13	Team Heretics	Fnatic	
Valorant Champions 2025	(France) Paris	September 12 – October 5	NRG	Fnatic	
