= Esports World Cup =

Annual esports tournament series held in Saudi Arabia

Tournament information
- Sport: Esports
- Location: Riyadh, Saudi Arabia (2024-25, 2027); Paris, France (2026)
- Month played: July–August
- Administrator: Esports Foundation; Tournaments supervised by ESL
- Purse: US$75 million (2026); US$71.5 million (2025); US$62.5 million (2024)
- Website: esportsworldcup.com

Current champion
- AG.AL (Note: For Club Championship purposes, All Gamers are known as "AG.AL Esports International" (or just AG.AL), as the organization includes All Gamers (based in China), All Gamers Global (for players outside of China), All Combo (the Mobile Legends: Bang Bang division of All Gamers based in Malaysia) and Anyone's Legend (most notably the League of Legends division of All Gamers).)

Most recent tournament
- 2026 Esports World Cup

The Esports World Cup (EWC) is an annual international esports tournament series run by the Esports Foundation, a nonprofit organization. It is considered the largest professional esports event in the world in terms of total prize pool and number of game titles represented, with upwards of US$70 million awarded across individual tournament prize pools, rewards for teams that qualify to events, most valuable player awards, and the Club Championship. (Note: While the EWC has the largest total prize pool across multiple games, individual game prize pools remain smaller than those of some single-title events, such as The International (Dota 2), the League of Legends World Championship or the Fortnite World Cup.) The 2025 edition featured competitions across more than 25 game titles and 28 club teams. According to the event's organizers, the 2025 event brought together more than 2,500 participants (players and team personnel) from 100 countries.

The tournament takes place in Riyadh, Saudi Arabia, from July to August each year. The 2026 edition was moved to Paris, France.

The Esports World Cup has its origins in Gamers Without Borders (GWB), a charity esports tournament series run by the Saudi Arabian Federation for Electronic and Intellectual Sport (SAFEIS, with esports later being spun off to become the Saudi Esports Federation) that originally supported charities who played a part in the response to the COVID-19 pandemic. In 2022, the SEF launched Gamers8, an eight-week gaming and esports festival held in Riyadh's Boulevard City, with Gamers Without Borders serving as a qualifying series in most titles to Gamers8. In 2023, Gamers8 played host to the final FIFAe World Cup held on the FIFA series of video games published by EA Sports, along with introducing the Club Awards, a US$5 million cross-game competition where the best-performing esport clubs across multiple titles were awarded prize money.

In September 2023, the EWC and its eponymous foundation were formally established by Crown Prince Mohammed bin Salman, with the inaugural Esports World Cup held the following year as the successor to Gamers8. The tournament series dramatically increased in scope, with most of the major esports titles present at the event. In addition, the Club Awards were replaced with the Club Championship, a wider US$20 million cross-game competition that aggregates the individual game results of all participating organizations (known as "clubs" to the EWC) to crown a Club Champion. The inaugural edition was won by Saudi Arabia's Team Falcons. Esport clubs were also given financial incentives via the Club Support Program (later the Club Partner Program).

In 2025, the EWC introduced chess as part of its lineup, with Magnus Carlsen serving as the EWC's official chess ambassador, as part of an enlargement of the series to consist of a US$70 million+ prize pool. The EWC would have a US$75 million prize pool in 2026.

== Background ==
=== Gamers Without Borders ===
In April 2020, the Saudi Arabian Federation for Electronic and Intellectual Sport (SAFEIS) announced Gamers Without Borders (GWB), a seven-week series of esports tournaments designed to support organizations who were responding to the then-ongoing COVID-19 pandemic. The inaugural GWB boasted a US$10 million prize pool, with participating teams choosing the charities they'd donate their winnings to. Titles present at Gamers Without Borders 2020 included Dota 2, Fortnite, FIFA 20, PUBG Mobile, Rainbow Six Siege and Rocket League, with all competitions played online and most split by region due to travel restrictions imposed as a result of the pandemic.

GWB ran its second edition as a standalone event in 2021, also having a US$10 million prize pool, with donations mainly focusing on the distribution of COVID-19 vaccines. This occurred after the esports side of SAFEIS was spun off, with the body becoming the Saudi Esports Federation.

=== Gamers8 ===
In 2022, the Saudi Esports Federation launched Gamers8, an in-person gaming and esports festival, held in the capital Riyadh's Boulevard City. The inaugural edition, spanning 8 weeks, featured musical performances as well as tournaments in Dota 2 (known as Riyadh Masters), Fortnite, PUBG Mobile. Rainbow Six Siege and Rocket League, with a total prize pool of US$15 million. Gamers Without Borders returned that year as well, serving as a qualifying series to Gamers8 for its participating titles and still donating US$15 million to charities.

In September 2022, Saudi Arabia presented the National Gaming and Esports Strategy (NGES), which aims to make the country a global center for the video game industry by 2030 in accordance to Saudi Vision 2030, a strategic plan led by Crown Prince Mohammed bin Salman to diversify the Saudi economy, create job opportunities, and reduce reliance on oil. The NGES encompasses 86 initiatives spanning eight focus areas: Technology and hardware development, game production, e-sports, additional services, infrastructure, regulations, education and talent acquisition. The Saudi government's goals include producing more than 30 competitive games in domestic studios, creating more than 39,000 new jobs in the sector, and becoming one of the top three countries by number professional esports players.

Gamers8 returned in 2023, with the subtitle "The Land of Heroes". This edition saw 15 esports titles being contested, with the likes of Tekken 7 and Counter-Strike: Global Offensive being added to the festival proper. Most notably, Gamers8 also hosted the 2023 FIFAe World Cup, played on the video game FIFA 23, as well as the FIFAe Nations Cup and FIFAe Club World Cup. The 2023 FIFAe World Cup, won by Dutch gamer Manuel "ManuBachoore" Bachoore, would serve as the final FIFAe World Cup held on the FIFA series of video games published by EA Sports, as football's governing body ended their relationship with EA after the tournaments. Overall, Gamers8 2023 boasted a then-record US$45 million USD combined prize pool, beating the 2021 iteration of the Dota 2 tournament The International for biggest prize pool in esports history; the Riyadh Masters 2023 Dota tournament offered a US$15 million prize pool alone.

As part of the prize pool, Gamers8 2023 also introduced the Club Awards, a US$5 million cross-game competition where teams earned points if they finished in the top 8 of select tournaments contested at the event. In order to qualify for the Club Awards, a team had to score points in two or more eligible tournaments, and only the top 8 of those teams earned prize money. The 2023 Gamers8 Club Awards were won by Saudi Arabian organization Twisted Minds.

=== Esports World Cup ===
==== 2024 ====
In accordance with the already existing NGES, Saudi Arabia announced the Esports World Cup in October 2023, as the successor to Gamers8. The announcement came during the Kingdom's "New Global Sport Conference", attended by both senior government officials and leading figures in the sports, gaming, and esports sectors. Crown Prince Mohammed bin Salman stated during the announcement that "The Esports World Cup is the natural next step in Saudi Arabia's journey to become the premier global hub for gaming and esports, offering an unmatched esports experience that pushes the boundaries of the industry. The competition will enhance our progress towards realizing the Vision 2030 objectives of diversifying the economy, growing the tourism sector, creating new jobs in various industries, and providing world-class entertainment for citizens, residents, and visitors alike." EWC's operations were transferred from the Saudi Esports Federation to the newly-created Esports World Cup Foundation.

As part of the announcement of the Esports World Cup, it was revealed that the Foundation had purchased the Electronic Sports World Cup (ESWC) branding. While the Esports World Cup briefly used the acronym ESWC after its announcement, it has shifted to use EWC instead, hinting that the acquisition of the ESWC brand was purely to avoid confusion between the two entities.

Like with Gamers8, the Esports World Cup was held in Riyadh's Boulevard City, with most events taking place in a 645,000 square foot (59,900 m^{2}) venue that featured four separate esports arenas: the SEF Arena (known as the Qiddiya City Arena for sponsorship purposes), the 5V5 Arena (known as the Amazon Arena for sponsorship purposes), the BR Arena (known as the stc Arena for sponsorship purposes) and the Riyadh Festival. The stc Play Gaming Hall, also in Boulevard City, hosted last chance qualifiers for some games as well as side tournaments for titles like Strinova and Valorant.

The 2024 Esports World Cup featured the then-largest combined prize pool in esports history, as esport teams and organizations competed for a total of US$62.5 million (marketed as US$60 million+ and with the tagline "Life changing prize money"). This included the main tournaments, qualifiers, MVP awards and the Club Championship, the successor to the Gamers8 Club Awards. The Club Championship gave out US$20 million among the top 16 organizations ("clubs") determined by their overall performance in various games throughout the tournament. The same qualifying mechanism from the Club Awards was kept, but the Club Championship was only won by the best organization who had won at least one eligible tournament at EWC. In actuality, due to a tie for 16th place between the organizations FURIA Esports and Weibo Gaming, 17 organizations received prize money from the Club Championship, as any ties below first place were left unresolved and prize money split amongst the tied clubs.

In addition, thirty top esports organizations were paid for their participation in the Esports World Cup via the Club Support Program, an initiative designed to provide substantial financial assistance to these organizations. Through this program, chosen teams received annual financial support to enhance their operations and a one-time cash stimulus to enter esports present at the Esports World Cup. Some have speculated that the stipend to enter new esports was how organizations like Team Vitality entered titles such as StarCraft II and Mobile Legends: Bang Bang.

A total of 22 tournaments, from 21 titles, were contested as part of the Club Championship. New tournaments included Mobile Legends: Bang Bang's Mid Season Cup and Women's Invitational, the Honor of Kings Invitational Midseason and tournaments for League of Legends and Call of Duty: Modern Warfare III, among others. The Club Championship was won by Saudi organization Team Falcons.

==== 2025 ====
At the conclusion of the 2024 Esports World Cup, it was announced that the 2025 edition would run between July and August of that year, later confirmed to be from July 7 to August 24, 2025, a full week less than both editions of Gamers8 and the inaugural EWC.

A total of 25 Club Championship-eligible tournaments took place during the 2025 Esports World Cup, with only Fortnite not returning from the prior year. The new additions to the Esports World Cup proper include Crossfire and Valorant (as part of a three-year deal with Riot Games), as well as chess; while chess is mainly a physical board game, digital versions such as with Chess.com mean that it is considered an esport by the Esports World Cup Foundation. Norwegian grandmaster Magnus Carlsen was appointed as the official chess ambassador of the Esports World Cup when the game was announced to be part of EWC in December 2024. Cristiano Ronaldo was later announced as the EWC's Global Ambassador. The Club Support Program was also expanded to 40 organizations and rebranded as the Club Partner Program, with a total of US$20 million given out directly to clubs via this mechanism.

This edition of the Esports World Cup expanded its total prize pool to US$71.5 million (marketed as US$70 million+), including MVP awards and qualifying tournaments. Of this, US$27 million went to the Club Championship. Team Falcons would defend their Club Championship title.

==== 2026 ====
The 2026 Esports World Cup will take place from July 6 to August 23, 2026, keeping the seven week schedule from the prior edition.

This year's EWC will once again feature 25 Club Championship-eligible tournaments across 24 games. 2024 and 2025 titles Rennsport and StarCraft II would be absent, being replaced by the returning Fortnite (under a three-year deal with Epic Games, this time via the Fortnite Reload mode as the Reload Elite Series Championship) and the debuting Trackmania. The EWC's overall prize pool would be expanded once more to a record US$75 million, with US$30 million being allocated for the Club Championship alone. The Club Championship was won by Chinese organization AG.AL.

On 20 May 2026, it was announced that the 2026 Esports World Cup would move to Paris, France, owing to regional instability due to the 2026 Iran war.

According to Esports Charts, the Mobile Legends: Bang Bang (MLBB) Mid Season Cup attracted the largest total audience at EWC 2026, reaching over 2.88 million concurrent viewers (PCV)—the highest viewership of any tournament at the event.

== Format ==
=== Qualification ===
Teams qualify for the Esports World Cup via several mechanisms depending on the game in question. Most titles qualify teams and players via regional leagues and tournaments. For example, most teams qualify for the Overwatch 2 tournament via finishing as one of the best teams in their Overwatch Champions Series (OWCS) regional league's second split (North America, EMEA, China, Pacific, Korea and Japan). Other tournaments invite teams to compete, such as with the League of Legends tournament in 2024 (even if all participating teams qualified for that year's Mid-Season Invitational). Since the 2025 Esports World Cup, some titles have seen their champions from the prior year automatically qualify for the event. For fighting games, EA Sports FC, chess and others, Last Chance Qualifiers (LCQs) are held at the stc Play Gaming Hall, open to all willing players and with the top participants qualifying for their respective Esports World Cup tournaments.

Since 2025, the Asian Champions League (ACL) has served as an Asia-specific qualifier for multiple titles at the Esports World Cup. For example, in Counter-Strike 2, the winner of the ACL qualifies for the Esports World Cup tournament; the other spots are invites based on Valve's proprietary Regional Standings or open qualifiers if applicable. The ACL is run by Hero Esports (formerly VSPO), with the 2025 Grand Finals also part of DreamHack Shanghai.

=== Club Championship ===
The Club Championship is a cross-game competition within the Esports World Cup. A share of the prize pool is given among the top clubs (used by the EWC in place of "organization"), determined by their overall performance in various games throughout the tournament. In 2024, the top 16 clubs in the Club Championship were guaranteed to earn a share of the prize money. To qualify for the Club Championship, a club had to finish in the top 8 in at least two competitions, and to win the championship title, the club also had to secure first place in at least one competition. Only participants who were publicly announced as part of their respective organization were eligible to earn points for their club. The Club Championship's prize pool would be expanded to the top 24 clubs beginning in 2025. Below is a breakdown of the points awarded based on placement in the individual game championships in 2024:

Point distribution per event (Note: For events with no tiebreakers, 3–4 receive 275 points, 5–6 receive 90 points, 5–8 receive 60 points, and/or 7–8 receive 30 points.)
Pos.	Points	Pos.	Points
1	1000	5	110
2	600	6	70
3	350	7	40
4	200	8	20

=== Club Partner Program ===
The Esports Foundation's Club Partner Program (formerly the Club Support Program and initially just the Club Program) is an initiative designed to provide substantial financial assistance to selected esports organizations. Through this program, chosen teams received annual financial support to enhance their operations and create more opportunities for professional players. A total of 30 esports organizations were selected to the Club Support Program in 2024, and 40 to the Club Partner Program in 2025 and 2026, based on past competitive achievements, future strategies, and approaches to fan engagement. As with all other competitors in the EWC, members of the Club Partner Program must have earned qualification for each game's event and the Club Championship, but they remained eligible for annual financial rewards irrespective of their qualification status, as well as a one-time payment if an organization wants to enter new esports, particularly those who had a presence at the Esports World Cup. The rewards were contingent upon each member's capacity to enhance viewership and fan engagement for the EWC.

== Featured games ==
In the 2024 edition, 23 events were played across 22 video game titles. In 2025, the number of events was increased to 26 while the number of games was increased to 25. As of 2026, Mobile Legends: Bang Bang is the only game to have had multiple events in a single year, one for men and one for women. Some events are also held as part of the EWC, such as the PUBG Mobile World Cup and Honor of Kings World Cup, while others have no bearing on the Club Championship, such as Strinova and Naraka: Bladepoint.

Game/Series		G8 2022	G8 2023	2024	2025	2026	2027	2028
Apex Legends				✓	✓ (Note: Played as the Apex Legends Global Series (ALGS) Mid-Season Playoffs.)	✓ (Note: To be played as the Apex Legends Global Series (ALGS) Split 1 Playoffs.)		
Call of Duty series				✓ (Note: Played on Call of Duty: Modern Warfare III.)	✓ (Note: Played on Call of Duty: Black Ops 6.)	✓ (Note: To be played on Call of Duty: Black Ops 7.)	✓	
Call of Duty: Warzone				✓	✓	✓ (Note: To be held as the Call of Duty: Warzone Resurgence Series Championship.)	✓	
Chess					✓ (Note: Held as the Champions Chess Tour Finals.)	✓		
Counter-Strike series			✓ (Note: Played on Counter-Strike: Global Offensive.)	✓ (Note: Played on Counter-Strike 2.)	✓	✓	✓	
Crossfire					✓	✓		
Dota 2		✓ (Note: Known as the Riyadh Masters.)	✓	✓	✓	✓		
FIFA/EA Sports FC			✓ (Note: Played on FIFA 23, via the FIFAe World Cup, Club World Cup and Nations Cup.)	✓ (Note: Played on EA Sports FC 24.)	✓ (Note: Played on EA Sports FC 25 as the EA Sports FC Pro World Championship.)	✓ (Note: To be played on EA Sports FC 26 as the EA Sports FC Pro World Championship.)		
Fatal Fury: City of the Wolves					✓	✓	✓	
Fortnite		✓	✓	✓ (Note: Played on the ESL Featuring Fortnite UEFN mode and was known as Esports World Cup: Featuring Fortnite as Epic Games did not endorse the title's inclusion at the Esports World Cup at the time.)		✓ (Note: To be played on the Fortnite Reload mode as the Reload Elite Series Championship.)	✓	✓
Free Fire (Note: The game was known as Garena Free Fire during the 2024 EWC.)				✓	✓	✓		
GeoGuessr					✘ (Note: Cancelled. Intended as the Last Chance Wildcard Tournament for the 2025 GeoGuessr World Cup.)			
Honor of Kings				✓ (Note: Held as the Honor of Kings Invitational Midseason.)	✓ (Note: Held as the Honor of Kings World Cup.)	✓		
League of Legends				✓	✓	✓	✓	
Mobile Legends: Bang Bang	Men's			✓	✓	✓		
Mobile Legends: Bang Bang	Women's			✓	✓	✓		
Naraka: Bladepoint					✓ (Note: Side tournament that did not count towards the Club Championship.)			
Overwatch (Note: The game was known as Overwatch 2 during the 2024 and 2025 EWCs.)				✓	✓ (Note: Held as the Overwatch Champions Series Mid-Season Showdown.)	✓		
PUBG: Battlegrounds			✓ (Note: Held as PUBG Global Series 2.)	✓	✓	✓		
PUBG Mobile		✓ (Note: Held as the PUBG Mobile World Invitational.)	✓	✓ (Note: Held as the PUBG Mobile World Cup.)	✓	✓		
Rainbow Six Siege (Note: The game was known as Rainbow Six Siege X during the 2025 EWC.)		✓	✓	✓	✓	✓		
Rennsport			✓	✓	✓			
Rocket League		✓	✓	✓ (Note: Was known as Esports World Cup: Featuring Rocket League as Psyonix did not endorse the title's inclusion at the Esports World Cup at the time.)	✓	✓	✓	✓
StarCraft II			✓	✓	✓			
Street Fighter 6			✓	✓	✓	✓	✓	
Strinova				✓				
Teamfight Tactics (Note: Teamfight Tactics at the Esports World Cup focuses on teams of four instead of individual players, with two teams in each match and each player earning points for their team based on lobby position.)				✓	✓	✓	✓	
Tekken series			✓ (Note: Played on Tekken 7 via a national team tournament known as the Nations Cup.)	✓ (Note: Played on Tekken 8.)	✓	✓		
Trackmania						✓		
Valorant					✓	✓	✓	
Total events		5	12	23	26	25	>10	>2
Total games		5	12	22	25	24	>10	>2

== Trophy ==
The trophy for the first Esports World Cup, used for the Club Championship, was formally unveiled in Riyadh in 2024. It was designed and crafted by London Silversmiths Thomas Lyte. Standing at a height of 60cm, it was shaped from more than 9kg of sterling silver.

Thomas Lyte originally designed 10 concept ideas for the trophy. The final design contains a number of features, such as interweaving triangles, inspired by game controller buttons. The stem was cast from a 3D printed model and resembles the trunk of a palm tree, a recognizable symbol of Saudi Arabia. A crown sits at the top of the trophy. The trophy's handles have been fashioned to look like compacted computer wiring. The Esports World Cup was cast in multiple sections, each filed, polished, and plated in 24-carat gold.

Each competitor in the Esports World Cup has a personalized triangular key. This key is inserted into the trophies for each game (known as "Game Trophies") when won. The frame of the key will be placed into the Totem; a physical block on display in Riyadh serving as a chronicle of the history of the Esports World Cup. When a player (or team) is eliminated from the tournament, however, they must give up their key, which is then crushed by a hydraulic press, encased in resin, and tossed into the base of the Totem. Each game's champion, however, can choose keys from three defeated opponents to be encased in the base of their Game Trophy instead of the base of the Totem.

== Response and controversy ==
The announcement of the Esports World Cup was met with a mixed response due to concerns over Saudi Arabia's human rights record and the tournament's use for sportswashing in a way not too dissimilar to other Saudi Arabian sports investments like LIV Golf and the Saudi Pro League. Saudi Arabia's significant investment in the esports scene, amounting to billions of dollars, has led to a rapid expansion of the industry within the country. However, these developments have occurred against a backdrop of ongoing international scrutiny regarding Saudi Arabia's human rights record, particularly concerning LGBTQ+ rights, women's rights, and its handling of dissent.

In June 2024, Team Liquid announced their intention to wear a Pride-inspired jersey at the Esports World Cup and were permitted to do so. In an article published in April 2024, American news channel CNN described the EWC as potentially being a "pivotal moment in the industry" following large scale layoffs by game developers and declining revenues for professional esports leagues; the article also noted that the event was part of Saudi Arabia's broader investment into sports, media, and entertainment amid allegations of sportswashing.

Multiple teams and players have chosen not to participate in both versions of the tournament series due to Saudi Arabia's reputation. A week before the Rocket League tournament at Gamers8 2022, Moist Esports withdrew from the competition. The team's manager, Noah "noah" Hinder, stated that he would "not be associating with a country that does not recognize LGBTQ+ people as human beings" and that "it's important to put my morals and beliefs over money". Similarly, Ex Oblivione decided not to attend the Overwatch 2 tournament at the 2024 Esports World Cup had they qualified, expressing concerns about the lack of necessary accessibility for all members of their community and the potential exclusion of their fans from participating in the event alongside them. In 2025, Christopher "ChrisCCH" Hancock, who had also refused to participate at Gamers8 and EWC tournaments in the past, declined to participate in that year's Street Fighter 6 tournament after he qualified via participating in the SFL World Championship. He cited how EWC was funded and managed, and how the Capcom Pro Tour's integration with the Esports World Cup meant that not participating in any EWC qualifiers would be equivalent to retiring from the game.

In May 2025, as a result of a comprehensive protest and blackout of "all major world maps" organised by community members, upcoming esport GeoGuessr withdrew from what would have been their premier showing at the Riyadh event later that year. The EWC had announced GeoGuessr's participation a mere week earlier. Community creators of in-game maps, by their own account a "supermajority of the most popular competitively relevant world maps", (Note: X.com user @RhinozzCode confirmed that maps in question were in GeoGuessr's competitive circulation.) collectively made their maps "unplayable", effectively disabling training and competing on the website. The map makers highlighted the sportswashing allegations and the fact that many members of the community "would be harshly persecuted were they to live in Saudi Arabia" as well as that the case of EWC "is not just an unfortunate tournament location; it's the government's own" event - ending with: "You don't play games with human rights." Davide Xu, of esports media company Hotspawn, noted that GeoGuessr was "one of the few games that is deeply community-driven." In a massive show of support, the official GeoGuessr Discord server was flooded with hundreds of messages echoing the demand to withdraw from the EWC. Plonk It, one of the largest organised GeoGuessr communities, joined the movement's effort with a gesture of their own. Less than 24 hours after the start of the protest, GeoGuessr announced their withdrawal from the EWC.

== See also ==
- Esports Nations Cup
- Olympic Esports Series
- Esports World Convention
- World Cyber Games
- International Esports Federation
- List of esports leagues and tournaments
- List of esports games
- Sport in Saudi Arabia
