= 2025 Esports World Cup =

Esports tournament series held in Saudi Arabia

Tournament information
- Sport: Esports
- Location: Riyadh, Saudi Arabia
- Dates: 8 July–24 August
- Administrator: Esports World Cup Foundation; Tournaments supervised by ESL
- Venue: Boulevard City
- Number of events: 26 in 25 esports
- Purse: $71.5 million
- Website: esportsworldcup.com

Final positions
- Champion: Team Falcons (2nd title)
- 1st runner-up: Team Liquid
- 2nd runner-up: Team Vitality

The 2025 Esports World Cup (EWC) was the second edition of the Esports World Cup, an annual international esports tournament series run by the Esports World Cup Foundation (EWCF). It took place in Riyadh, Saudi Arabia from 8 July to 24 August 2025 and featured 26 events in 25 esports.

Making their debuts this year were online chess, fighting game Fatal Fury: City of the Wolves, tactical shooters Crossfire and Valorant, and battle royale game Naraka: Bladepoint (as a non-Club Championship title). Call of Duty: Black Ops 6 and EA Sports FC 25 succeeded Call of Duty: Modern Warfare III and EA Sports FC 24, respectively, in the game lineup.

== Background ==
On 18 December 2024, the EWCF announced a new multi-year partnership with Chess.com, adding online chess as part of the EWC lineup. Players qualified through the Champions Chess Tour 2025, consisting of two online Tour events, for a chance at a share of a $1.5 million prize pool. There will also be an open last chance qualifier to be held during the EWC to fill out the remaining slots in the tournament. The addition of online chess also led to some notable chess figures being signed by various organizations, such as Magnus Carlsen with Team Liquid, Hikaru Nakamura with Team Falcons, and Ian Nepomniachtchi with Aurora Gaming, among others. Carlsen was announced as the EWC's chess ambassador on 18 December 2024, while Portuguese football player Cristiano Ronaldo was announced as global ambassador on 13 June 2025.

On 23 December 2024, tactical first-person shooter Crossfire was announced as the second new game. On 6 February 2025, Fatal Fury: City of the Wolves was added as part of a three-year partnership with SNK Corporation. Kenji Matsubara, CEO of SNK, then stated that “this partnership marks a historic milestone for Fatal Fury, a title loved around the world for 30 years, as it steps into the competitive gaming arena.” On 10 February 2025, Riot Games announced a new three-year partnership with the EWCF. As part of the partnership, tactical hero shooter Valorant was added to the EWC alongside League of Legends and Teamfight Tactics, which were part of last year's lineup.

Due to their annual release schedules, the Call of Duty and EA Sports FC series were represented by the newest entries in their respective franchises, Call of Duty: Black Ops 6 and EA Sports FC 25. (with EA later announcing the EA Sports FC Pro World Championship would be hosted at EWC). The Garena Free Fire and Rainbow Six Siege events will return as Free Fire and Rainbow Six Siege X. After they were featured in the 2024 EWC, the Fortnite and Strinova events didn't return in 2025. GeoGuessr was announced as part of the Esports World Cup on 15 May 2025, in a similar manner to Strinova in that it would not count towards the Club Championship. However, GeoGuessr instead would use EWC to hold the Wildcard tournament for the GeoGuessr World Cup. On 22 May 2025, GeoGuessr announced its withdrawal from EWC in response to community backlash over concerns regarding Saudi Arabia's human rights record. Naraka: Bladepoint would also be announced as part of the Esports World Cup on 15 May under the same status as Strinova and GeoGuessr.

== Format ==
=== Club Championship ===
The Club Championship was a cross-game competition within the Esports World Cup. The championship gave out a total of US$27 million among the top 24 clubs (used by the EWC in place of "organization"), determined by their overall performance in various games throughout the event. To qualify for the Club Championship, a club had to finish in the top 8 in at least two competitions, and to win the championship title, the club also had to secure first place in at least one competition. Only participants who were publicly announced as part of their respective organization before 15 May 2025 for most games, or 31 May 2025 for Apex Legends and EA Sports FC 25, were eligible to earn points for their club. Below is a breakdown of the points awarded based on placement in the individual game championships:

Point distribution per event (Note: For events with no tiebreakers, 3–4 receive 500 points and/or 5–8 receive 200 points.)
Pos.	Points	Pos.	Points
1	1000	5	200
2	750	6	150
3	500	7	100
4	300	8	50

=== Club Partner Program ===
The Esports World Cup Foundation's Club Partner Program (formerly the Club Support Program) was an initiative designed to provide substantial financial assistance to selected esports organizations. Through this program, chosen teams received annual financial support to enhance their operations and create more opportunities for professional players. This year, the program was expanded to cover 40 organizations, ten more than the 30 from the previous year.

The 40 teams represented the five major competitive regions — Europe, North America, Asia, South America, and the Middle East — with the majority of the teams being primarily based in Europe or Asia. Several teams from the 2024 Club Support Program, including TSM, OG and Blacklist International, did not make the Club Partner Program.

Europe

- Fnatic
- G2 Esports
- Gentle Mates
- HEROIC
- Karmine Corp
- MOUZ
- Movistar KOI
- Natus Vincere (Note: Team qualified for the Club Partner Program as one of the top 8 clubs in the 2024 Club Championship.)
- Ninjas in Pyjamas (Note: For Club Championship purposes, Ninjas in Pyjamas are known as "NIP.Estar", as NIP Group also own Chinese organization Estar Pro.)
- Team BDS
- Team Liquid
- Team Secret
- Team Spirit
- Team Vitality
- Virtus.pro

North America

- 100 Thieves
- Cloud9
- FaZe Clan
- Gaimin Gladiators
- Sentinels

Asia

- All Gamers (Note: For Club Championship purposes, All Gamers are known as "AG.AL Esports International" (or just AG.AL), as the organization includes All Gamers (based in China), All Gamers Global (for players outside of China) and Anyone's Legend (the League of Legends division of All Gamers).)
- Bilibili Gaming
- Edward Gaming
- EVOS Esports
- Gen.G Esports
- JD Gaming
- ONIC Esports
- REJECT
- Rex Regum Qeon
- S8UL Esports
- T1
- Weibo Gaming
- Wolves Esports
- ZETA DIVISION

South America

- FURIA
- Leviatán
- LOUD

Middle East

- POWR Esports
- Team Falcons
- Twisted Minds

== Calendar ==
The calendar was unveiled on 15 April 2025 (with Naraka: Bladepoint added on 15 May). 26 events in 25 esports were held across a seven-week calendar, shortened from the eight-week calendar from last year.

●	Competitions days

July/August 2025		July																													August																		
July/August 2025		Week 1						Week 2							Week 3							Week 4							Week 5							Week 6							Week 7						
July/August 2025		8	9	10	11	12	13	14	15	16	17	18	19	20	21	22	23	24	25	26	27	28	29	30	31	1	2	3	4	5	6	7	8	9	10	11	12	13	14	15	16	17	18	19	20	21	22	23	24
Apex Legends				●	●	●	●																																										
Call of Duty: Black Ops 6																		●	●	●	●																												
Call of Duty: Warzone																																●	●	●															
Chess																							●	●	●	●																							
Counter-Strike 2																																														●	●	●	●
Crossfire																																												●	●	●	●	●	
Dota 2											●	●	●																																				
EA Sports FC 25																																●	●	●	●														
Fatal Fury: City of the Wolves				●	●	●																																											
Free Fire											●	●	●	●																																			
Honor of Kings																		●	●	●																													
League of Legends											●	●	●	●																																			
Mobile Legends: Bang Bang	Men's																								●	●	●																						
Mobile Legends: Bang Bang	Women's								●	●	●	●	●																																				
Naraka: Bladepoint																																															●	●	
Overwatch 2																									●	●	●	●																					
PUBG: Battlegrounds																																							●	●	●								
PUBG Mobile																			●	●	●		●	●		●	●	●																					
Rainbow Six Siege X																																●	●	●															
Rennsport		●	●	●	●																																												
Rocket League																																							●	●	●	●							
StarCraft II																●	●	●	●																														
Street Fighter 6																																														●	●	●	
Teamfight Tactics																																				●	●	●	●	●									
Tekken 8																																							●	●	●								
Valorant		●	●	●	●	●	●																																										

== Results ==
=== Event winners ===
Event	Gold	Silver	Bronze
Apex Legends (Note: Known as the ALGS Year 5 Midseason Playoffs, part of the Apex Legends Global Series.)	VK Gaming; Kasssa; QQ; LqDuD	ROC Esports; Vaxlon; Deeds; Sauceror	Ninjas in Pyjamas; Vein; Kurev; McLovin
Call of Duty: Black Ops 6	OpTic Gaming (Note: OpTic Gaming represented OpTic Texas of the Call of Duty League.); Dashy; Huke; Mercules; Shotzzy	Vancouver Surge; 04; Abuzah; Neptune; Nastie	Movistar KOI (Note: Movistar KOI represented Toronto Ultra of the Call of Duty League.); Abe; CleanX; Insight; JoeDeceives
Call of Duty: Warzone	Twisted Minds zSmit; Almond; Aydan	Gentle Mates; Enkeo; Gromalok; HalloW	Virtus.pro; Dongy; Newbz; Sage
Chess (Note: Takes the place of the Tour Finals for the Champions Chess Tour 2025.)	Magnus Carlsen (Team Liquid)	Alireza Firouzja (Team Falcons)	Hikaru Nakamura (Team Falcons)
Counter-Strike 2	The MongolZ; Techno4K; 910 mzinho bLitz; Senzu	Aurora Gaming; MAJ3R; XANTARES woxic Wicadia jottAAA	Team Falcons; NiKo; TeSeS m0NESY kyxsan kyousuke
CrossFire (Note: Takes the place of the CrossFire Stars Summer Championship 2025.)	AG.AL (Note: Due to the Esports World Cup requiring all divisions of a club to have unified branding for the Club Championship, All Gamers competed as AG.AL during the tournament.); ZY; Jwei; Doo; 1222; ZQ	BaiSha Gaming; Xxiao; N9; 577; Lye; YDSS	Evolution Power; ZAY mino YZK yh xqq
Dota 2 (Note: Formerly known as the Riyadh Masters during prior editions of Gamers8 (EWC's predecessor) and the Esports World Cup. The tournament takes the place of the Tour Finals for the ESL Pro Tour 2025.)	Team Spirit; Yatoro; Larl; Collapse; Rue; Miposhka	Team Falcons skiter Malr1ne; ATF; Cr1t- Sneyking	Parivision; Satanic; No[o]ne- DM; 9Class; Dukalis
EA Sports FC 25 (Note: Known as the FC Pro World Championship 2025.)	ManuBachoore (Team Liquid)	Brice (Team Vitality)	Levi de Weerd (Team Liquid)
Fatal Fury: City of the Wolves	GO1 (DetonatioN FocusMe)	Xiaohai (KuaiShou Gaming)	DarkAngel (Natus Vincere)
Free Fire (Note: Tournament is part of the Free Fire World Series.)	EVOS Esports (Note: Due to the Esports World Cup requiring all divisions of a club to have unified branding for the Club Championship, EVOS Divine competed as EVOS Esports during the tournament.); Rasyah; AimGOD; Reyyy; Koceel	Rex Regum Qeon (Note: Due to the Esports World Cup requiring all divisions of a club to have unified branding for the Club Championship, RRQ Kazu competed as Rex Regum Qeon during the tournament.); Dutzz; Abay; 18Deer; Maal	Team Vitality (Note: Due to the Esports World Cup requiring all divisions of a club to have unified branding for the Club Championship, Bigetron by Vitality competed as Team Vitality during the tournament.); JUMP; COUGAR; ZEN1S; DON
Honor of Kings (Note: Known as the Honor of Kings World Cup 2025.)	AG.AL (Note: Due to the Esports World Cup requiring all divisions of a club to have unified branding for the Club Championship, AG Super Play competed as AG.AL during the tournament, as they are part of the Chinese organization All Gamers.); Ran; Zoe; Sheng; YiNuo; Shuai	ThunderTalk Global (Note: Due to the Esports World Cup requiring all divisions of a club to have unified branding for the Club Championship, Talent Gaming competed as ThunderTalk Global during the tournament, as they are part of the Chinese organization ThunderTalk Gaming.); Qing; Sunrise; Crane; Snowy; Joy	Nova Esports; Xuan; Cy; Wendy; Muci; Weipit
League of Legends (Note: This event is not sponsored, endorsed, or administered by Riot Games, but the tournament is officially sanctioned by the developers.)	Gen.G; Kiin; Canyon; Chovy; Ruler; Duro	AG.AL (Note: Due to the Esports World Cup requiring all divisions of a club to have unified branding for the Club Championship, Anyone's Legend competed as AG.AL during the tournament, as they are part of the Chinese organization All Gamers.); Flandre; Tarzan; Shanks; Hope; Kael	T1; Doran; Oner; Faker; Gumayusi; Keria
Mobile Legends: Bang Bang – Men (Note: Known as the MLBB Mid Season Cup 2025.)	Team Liquid PH (Note: Due to a partnership, the points earned by this team go to Team Liquid.); Sanford; KarlTzy; Sanji; Oheb; Jaypee	SRG.OG; Kramm; Sekys; Stormie; Innocent; Yums	ONIC Philippines (Note: Due to a partnership, the points earned by this team go to ONIC Esports.); Kirk; K1NG KONG; Super Frince; Kelra; Brusko
Mobile Legends: Bang Bang – Women (Note: Known as the MLBB Women's Invitational 2025.)	Team Vitality; Fumi; Vival; Cinny; Chell; Vivian	Gaimin Gladiators; Aria; Nicholette; Sayori; Panda; Ashlay	Terror Queens; Hlaing; Ruli; LunaLynn; CKOSHIII; Kuu
Naraka: Bladepoint (Note: Known as the Naraka: Bladepoint Midseason Championship 2025. Tournament does not count towards the Esports World Cup Club Championship. The results on the top are for the Solos tournament while the results on the bottom are for the Trios tournament.)	Spider (Specific Reaction)	Verse (Weibo Gaming)	Edward (Once Again)
Naraka: Bladepoint	Specific Reaction; 17s Xhao; Riko	Attacking Soul Esports; XiaoWen; Han; Mist	BAODA Esports; Ny7; XeM vvv
Overwatch 2 (Note: Known as the OWCS Midseason Championship 2025, part of the Overwatch Champions Series.)	Team Falcons; Proper; MER1T; SOMEONE; Hanbin; ChiYo; Fielder	Al Qadsiah; LBBD7; CheckMate; ZIYAD; Landon; Kellex	Twisted Minds; Quartz; Youbi; KSAA; FunnyAstro; Simple
PUBG: Battlegrounds (Note: Tournament is part of the PUBG Global Championship.)	Twisted Minds xmpl BatulinS; Perfect1ks; Lu	Gen.G; Tosi; F1ame; Orca; BeaN	Team Falcons hwinn TGLTN; Shrimzy; Kickstart
PUBG Mobile (Note: Known as the PUBG Mobile World Cup 2025, part of the PUBG Mobile Global Championship.)	Yangon Galacticos; Smile; Marnett; Romeo; SAYCLOUD	Weibo Gaming; Suk; Order; 33z HECC	Alpha Gaming; Zyol; DOK; REFUS; TOP
Rainbow Six Siege X	Team Secret; Savage jume Adrian; Mowwwgli; NoaUrz	G2 Esports; Alem4o; Doki; BlaZ; Loira; Stompn	Furia Esports; FelipeX; HerdsZ; Jv92; Kheyze nade
Rennsport (Note: Tournament is part of the Rennsport R1 circuit.)	BMW M Team Redline Red Bull Sim Racing; Luke Bennett; Jeffery Rietveld; Sebastian Job; Kevin Siggy	Virtus.pro; Kevin Ellis Jr; Dáire McCormack; Vojtěch Fiala; Mikhail Statsenko	Team Vitality; Thibault Cazaubon; Marcell Csincsik; Erhan Jajovski; Jiri Toman
Rocket League (Note: This event is not sponsored, endorsed, or administered by Psyonix, and will be known as Esports World Cup: Featuring Rocket League.)	Karmine Corp; Vatira; Atow dralii	Geekay Esports; Archie; Joyo oaly	Team Falcons; Trk511; Rw9; Kiileerrz
StarCraft II	Serral (Basilisk)	Classic (Virtus.pro)	Cure (Team Liquid)
Street Fighter 6 (Note: Tournament is part of the Capcom Pro Tour.)	Xiaohai (KuaiShou Gaming)	Blaz (2Game Esports)	Leshar (DRX)
Teamfight Tactics (Note: Tournament utilizes four-player teams (or it can be less too) instead of the conventional 1v1 competitive format.)	Weibo Gaming; Saopimi; LBTZ; Guan; TianLong	Virtus.pro; Maris; Milo k1an NCC1	T1; Binteum sCsC dunizuni CrazyMoving AEGIS; Opale; Pas de Bol; Lyyyress; Gobosteur
Tekken 8	ULSAN (DN Freecs)	LOWHIGH (DRX)	CBM (DN Freecs)
Valorant	Team Heretics; Boo benjyfishy MiniBoo; RieNs; Wo0t	Fnatic; Boaster; Alfajer; Chronicle kaajak crashies	Gen.G t3xture Karon; Munchkin; Ash; Foxy9

== Prize pool ==
The 2025 Esports World Cup will have a prize pool of US$71.5 million, which surpasses the $62.5 million from last year as the largest combined prize pool in esports history. Like last year, the prize money will be broken down into four categories: the Club Championship, the individual Game Championships, Qualifiers, and MVP Awards. The Club Championship awards $27 million to the top 16 teams based on their overall performance, while each of the 24 Game Championships will have a combined prize pool of $38 million. Teams will earn a combined $5 million during qualifying events, while $500,000 is allocated for the MVP awards.

Prize money distribution
Category	Prize
Club Championship	$27,000,000
Game Championships	$38,000,000
Qualifiers	$6,000,000
MVP Awards	$500,000

Club Championship prize money distribution
Pos.	Team	Prize	Pos.	Team	Prize
1	Team Falcons	$7,000,000	14	DetonatioN FocusMe	$300,000
2	Team Liquid	$4,000,000	14	DN Freecs	$300,000
3	Team Vitality	$3,000,000	14	Karmine Corp	$300,000
4	Twisted Minds	$2,250,000	14	Team Secret	$300,000
4	Virtus.pro	$2,250,000	14	Team Spirit	$300,000
6	AG.AL	$1,500,000	19	G2 Esports	$225,000
7	Gen.G	$1,000,000	20	Al Qadsiah	$150,000
8	Weibo Gaming	$850,000	20	Gaimin Gladiators	$150,000
9	KuaiShou Gaming	$700,000	20	Geekay Esports	$150,000
10	DRX	$600,000	20	ROC Esports	$150,000
11	Aurora Gaming	$525,000	20	Rex Regum Qeon	$150,000
12	T1	$425,000			
12	Team Heretics	$425,000			

== Response ==
The Esports World Cup continues to be criticized for its use of sportswashing to cover up Saudi Arabia's human rights record. As part of their new partnership, Riot Games acknowledged that "some may not feel great about our decision to partner with the EWC in this way, and we respect that."

In March 2025, Christopher "ChrisCCH" Hancock, a professional Street Fighter 6 player, declined to participate at the Esports World Cup after he retroactively qualified for the Street Fighter 6 tournament via participating in the SFL World Championship. He cited how EWC was funded and managed by Saudi Arabia, and how the Capcom Pro Tour's integration with EWC meant that not participating in any EWC qualifiers would be equivalent to retiring from competing in the title. Hancock had also refused to participate at Gamers8 and EWC tournaments in the past.

In June 2025, Hambino, a professional Apex Legends player representing Team Orchid, announced that they would not attend the Esports World Cup, noting that they "do not feel comfortable playing in a country that has laws allowing for queer people to be murdered". A substitute player was selected to take Hambino's place and agreed to share any tournament earnings with them. Hambino stated that their portion of the earnings would be donated to support queer members in the community.
