= Team Falcons =

Saudi esports organization

- Short name: Falcons
- Divisions: Apex Legends; Call of Duty; Counter-Strike 2; Dota 2; FIFA; Mobile Legends: Bang Bang; Overwatch 2; PUBG; Rocket League; Tom Clancy's Rainbow Six Siege; Valorant; Free Fire; CrossFire; Fortnite; Chess
- Founded: 2017
- Based in: Saudi Arabia
- CEO: Mosaad Al-Dossary
- Partners: stc Play
- Website: falcons.sa

Team Falcons (formerly Falcons Esports) is a Saudi esports organization. Founded in 2017, the organization fields rosters in multiple esports. The organization has garnered a reputation for pursuing high-profile players and coaches, successfully constructing "superteams" in the process. The organization won the Esports World Cup Club Championship in 2024 and 2025.

== History ==
Team Falcons was co-founded in 2017 by Mossaad "Msdossary" Al-Dossary, the winner of the 2018 FIFA eWorld Cup. Msdossary also serves as the CEO of Team Falcons. In August 2022, Grant Rousseau joined Falcons, serving as their Global Director of Esports. Rousseau has stated that Msdossary's goal when founding Falcons was to develop "an esports world for gamers in MENA" (the Middle East and North Africa). Indeed, being a Saudi organization, the team plays in MENA, EMEA (Europe, the Middle East, and Africa), and Asian regions. Since its founding, a lot of Falcons' branding work has been focused on achieving popularity in MENA and Europe, in a similar fashion to the American FaZe Clan. The organization's financial backers have not been formally announced, though Nicholas Taifalos of Dot Esports wrote that "it is believed [the org has] connections with the Saudi royal family".

In July 2022, Gamers8 (a tournament organized by the Saudi Esports Federation), announced that Team Falcons would have their own dedicated spaces at an event in Riyadh. These two spaces were Falcons Arena and Falcons District; the former featured gaming tournaments, meet-and-greet events, and a live cooking show. The latter space featured merchandise, a museum showcasing the team's accomplishments, a gaming PC center, the "Learn to be a PRO" academy, and a streaming area. "Gamers8: The Land of Heroes", another esports festival was held in 2023 at Boulevard Riyadh City. The festival included an attraction dubbed "Falcons HQ", where visitors could play against gaming influencers.

Falcons have been documented targeting high-profile players and coaches who have considerable past success in professional esports, in hopes of signing them. The org has been successful in their courting of these players and coaches, developing a reputation of forming what esports media writers have referred to as "superteams" in various esports. Some players, however, have turned down joining Falcons, with Canadian Counter-Strike player "Twistzz" even stating "obviously, if I wanted the bag and I didn't care about my career, then I would go to Falcons. But I do care about my career. I have morals, and it's not about the money." In 2023 and 2024, the organization made a push to form rosters across multiple esports. Taifalos wrote that "Many gaming fans and pundits have likened Falcons' push into esports to 'sportswashing'."

== Divisions ==
Team Falcons fields rosters in Apex Legends, Counter-Strike 2, Dota 2, FIFA / EA Sports FC, Overwatch, PUBG, Rocket League, Tom Clancy's Rainbow Six Siege, Valorant and Trackmania. It has also previously competed in Call of Duty competitions.

In mid-2023, Falcons was aiming to make a deal with Astralis, an org looking to sell its slot in the League of Legends EMEA Championship (LEC). However, talks broke down after Riot Games (League's publisher) did not sanction the purchase; the slot eventually went to Karmine Corp.

In May 2024, Falcons announced a partnership with AP Bren, an esports team competing in Mobile Legends: Bang Bang tournaments. Their partnership was made ahead of the season 13 playoffs of MPL Philippines.

=== Apex Legends ===
In May 2024, Falcons entered the competitive Apex Legends scene, signing Phillip "ImperialHal" Dosen, Noyan "Genburten" Ozkose, and Rhys "Zer0" Perry. Due to the trio's dominance in professional Apex with their previous teams (TSM for Hal and DarkZero for the latter two), esports media writers considered their joining under Falcons to be a "superteam". ALGS Year 4 Split 2's Pro League marked the first competitive campaign for the trio. Falcons won the North American Pro League and later won the silver medal at the 2024 Esports World Cup.

Despite entering the ALGS Year 4 Split 2 Playoffs LAN tournament as favorites, the team finished in 20th-place. The disappointing result led to a roster change as Genburten departed from the team, being replaced by Ben "Wxltzy" Walton. Kyle "Draugr" Gillard was also signed as the team's head coach.

The subsequent ALGS Year 5 was marked by reports of internal conflicts among the roster, and on September 10, 2025, Zer0 was benched. On September 15, it was announced that Zachary “Gild” Dennis would replace Zer0, who was removed from the roster.

=== Call of Duty ===
In August 2024, Falcons acquired the Vegas Legion franchise spot in the Call of Duty League from C0ntact Gaming. The team will compete as the Vegas Falcons starting in the 2025 season, utilizing the same roster fielded by Falcons at the 2024 Esports World Cup.

Prior to the 2026 season, the franchise was renamed to the Riyadh Falcons.

=== Counter-Strike 2 ===
Team Falcons fields a Counter-Strike 2 (CS2) roster. In October 2023, the team signed coach Danny "zonic" Sørensen. zonic previously led Astralis to four Counter-Strike: Global Offensive (CSGO) major championships, before winning a fifth title with Team Vitality. zonic's signing was considered a surprise as Falcons ranked 55th in the world at the time. Later in October, Falcons signed Emil "Magisk" Reif, who was previously coached by zonic on Astralis and Vitality. Falcons also signed Marco "Snappi" Pfeiffer from Ence. Media reports about Nikola "NiKo" Kovač agreeing to join Falcons were issued, though he denied a transfer to the team from G2 Esports. Instead, Falcons' CS2 roster was ultimately rounded out with the signings of Alvaro "SunPayus" García and Pavle "Maden" Bošković, also from Ence.

In February 2024, Oleksandr "s1mple" Kostyljev joined Falcons on a one-month loan from Natus Vincere. While he was loaned to Falcons specifically to compete in at the BLAST Premier Spring Showdown 2024 tournament, the team was upset by Metizport and eliminated in the first round. The team also failed to qualify for the PGL Major Copenhagen 2024. Also in March, the org signed Peter "dupreeh" Rasmussen to the roster.

In April, the team suffered another upset by RUBY in the first round of the European Open Qualifier for the Esports World Cup 2024 tournament. The loss meant that Falcons would not represent its sponsor region in the tournament.

In September, after being eliminated in last place at the BLAST Premier Fall Final, Falcons would sign S1mple for a second loan replacing SunPayus, this time lasting until the end of 2024 and including the Shanghai Major Europe RMRs.

Following their elimination from the Perfect World Shanghai Major RMRs, Falcons benched Snappi, Maden and dupreeh, reducing the team's active roster to just Magisk. On January 3, 2025, Falcons signed Nikola "NiKo" Kovač along with their assistant coach Aymein from G2. The next day, Falcons completed the roster after acquiring the HEROIC core of Damjan "kyxsan" Stoilkovski, René "TeSeS" Madsen and Abdul "degster" Gasanov.

Falcons won their first Counter-Strike 2 trophy following a victory over G2 Esports at PGL Bucharest 2025. At the tournament, degster achieved his first HLTV MVP, in his final event for Falcons before his replacement by Ilya "m0NESY" Osipov.

In April 2025, Falcons reached the final in IEM Melbourne, in their debut event with m0NESY.

On April 20, 2026, Falcons signing of Danish in-game leader karrigan from FaZe Clan was announced, replacing kyxsan, who was moved to the bench. The team then won the Cologne 2026 Major, defeating FURIA in the Grand Final.

==== Roster ====
Team Falcons Counter-Strike 2 roster
Players
Coaches

Handle	Name	Nationality
karrigan	Andersen, Finn	Denmark
NiKo	Kovač, Nikola	Bosnia and Herzegovina
m0NESY	Osipov, Ilya	Russia
TeSeS	Madsen, René	Denmark
kyousuke	Lukin, Maxim	Russia

Head coach

Danny "zonic" Sørensen

Legend:
- (I) Inactive
- (S) Suspended
- Substitute
- (injured) Injury / Illness

Latest roster transaction: April 20, 2026.

=== Dota 2 ===
In November 2023, Falcons entered the competitive Dota 2 scene with the signings of Oliver "Skiter" Lepko, Ammar "ATF" al-Assaf, Andreas "Cr1t-" Nielsen, Wu "Sneyking" Jingjun, and Stanislav "Malr1ne" Potorak, under coach Kurtis "Aui_2000" Ling.

The team won the BetBoom Dacha Dubai 2024 tournament in February, with ATF being awarded MVP honors. In March, the team had a dominant victory in the DreamLeague Season 22 tournament, winning the US$300,000 grand prize after a 3–0 sweep over BetBoom Team in the finals. More early successes followed in DreamLeague Season 23 and other regional LAN/online events.

In August 2025, Team Falcons won FISSURE Universe: Episode 6, defeating Team Spirit 3–0 in the grand final to claim the US$125,000 first prize.

At The International 2025, held in Hamburg, Germany, Falcons defeated Xtreme Gaming 3–2 in the grand final to claim the Aegis of Champions. Their path to the title included victories over Tidebound in the upper bracket quarterfinals, BetBoom Team in the semifinals, and PARIVISION in the upper bracket final. With this win, Falcons secured their first International championship. Coach Kurtis "Aui_2000" Ling became the first person to win The International three times: once as a player in 2015, and twice as coach in 2022 and 2025.

Falcons was nominated for "Best Esports Team" at The Game Awards 2025, but did not win.

==== Notable results of Dota 2 ====
Year	Tournament	Result
2025	FISSURE Universe: Episode 6	1st place (def. Team Spirit 3–0, Grand Final)
2025	The International 2025	1st place (def. Xtreme Gaming 3–2, Grand Final)

=== Mobile Legends: Bang Bang ===
In May 2024, before the start of the MPL Philippines Season 13 Playoffs, Team Falcons would sign a partnership deal with AP Bren, renaming their MLBB roster to "Falcons AP Bren". The team would proceed to lose in the grand finals of both MPL-PH S13 and the MLBB Mid Season Cup (the latter held in Riyadh) to Liquid ECHO and Selangor Red Giants respectively. The team failed to qualify for M6 after finishing as second runners-up in MPL-PH S14 to Aurora Gaming.

Upon the conclusion of 2024 and the beginning of 2025, Team Falcons and AP Bren went their separate ways, with AP Bren keeping their spot. On January 24, 2025, it was announced that Team Falcons and fellow Saudi team Twisted Minds would enter MPL Philippines for Season 15 onwards, replacing the outgoing Blacklist International and RSG Philippines.

On February 1, 2025, Team Falcons Philippines announced their roster for Snapdragon Pro Series Season 6 Challenge Finals, which included M5 World Champions from AP.Bren; Michael Angelo "KyleTzy" Sayson, Marco Stephen "Super Marco" Requitiano, cousins Rowgien "Owgwen" Unigo and Vincent Joseph "Pandora" Villones Unigo, as well as the two time world champions (M2 and M5) David Charles "FlapTzy" Canon, and Angelo Kyle "Pheww" Arcangel. These players were not tagged as "loan", which hints that they are fully part of the Philippine MLBB department of Team Falcons. Team Falcons PH unveiled their roster for MPL-PH S15 with the said squad, fully confirming the acquisition.

Falcons also run a team in the Mobile Legends: Bang Bang Professional League MENA (MPL MENA) and have done so since the 2023 Fall season. The team finished runners-up of 2023 Fall, qualifying for M5 World Championship Wild Card, and won Season 5 (2024 Spring), qualifying for MSC 2024.

==== MPL Philippines roster ====
Team Falcons PH Mobile Legends: Bang Bang roster
Players
Coaches

Handle	Name	Nationality
EXP Lane	Flap	Canon, David Charles	Philippines
Jungler	Kyle	Sayson, Michael Angelo	Philippines
Mid Lane	Hadji	Imam, Salic	Philippines
Gold Lane	Super Marco	Requitiano, Marco Stephen	Philippines
Roamer	Owgwen	Unigo, Rowgien Stimpson	Philippines
EXP Lane	Ferdz	Fernandez, Edferdz	Philippines

Head coach

Francis "Duckey" Glindro

Legend:
- (I) Inactive
- (S) Suspended
- Substitute
- (injured) Injury / Illness

Latest roster transaction: 18 August 2025.

=== Overwatch ===
Falcons won the Season 2 tournament of the Overwatch Contenders' European division in July 2021. In February 2024, Falcons constructed a roster for the Overwatch Champions Series (OWCS). It was made up of South Korean Overwatch veterans along with a Saudi Arabian player "Sir Majed" and included some former Overwatch League champions.

=== Rocket League ===
In March 2021, Falcons Esports acquired Sleeping, a Saudi Rocket League team. The roster consisted of players "Venom", "Ali", "trk511", and "faisal", with "Mr3zo" as their manager. After roster changes, a team of "Ahmad", "oKhaliD", and "trk511" placed second in the Rocket League Championship Series (RLCS) 2021–22 Spring Split Major, losing the final series in seven rounds to Moist Esports. In December 2023, Falcons signed twins "Rw9" and "Kiileerrz" from Rule One to join "trk511". This roster won multiple international events, such as the FIFAe World Cup and the Raleigh Major. For the 2026 season, Falcons dropped Trk511. Team Falcons signed dralii from Karmine Corp.

=== Tom Clancy's Rainbow Six Siege ===
The Saudi org fields a roster in Rainbow Six Siege (R6). The team qualified for the Six Invitational 2024, though were eliminated in the tournament by Team Liquid. In February 2024, Falcons signed Hashem "Hashom" Al Jafri.

In February 2025, Swiss esports organization Team BDS announced that their entire Rainbow Six Siege roster was allowed to explore opportunities with other teams for the 2025 season. The following month, Team Falcons announced that the org had signed former Team BDS players Loïc ‘BriD’ Chongthep, Théo ‘LikEfac’ Mariano, Stéphane ‘Shaiiko’ Lebleu, Fatih ‘Solotov’ Türker, Josh ‘Yuzus’ Pritchard, and former Team BDS coach Samy ‘Stooflex’ Smail to form Team Falcons' new Rainbow Six Siege roster.

In early 2026, further roster moves were made following a 3rd place finish at the Six Invitational. Shaiiko was moved to the bench before ultimately signing with G2 Esports. Jume (formerly a member of Team Secret) was brought in to complete the current five-man lineup alongside LikEfac, Solotov, Yuzus, and BriD.

==== Roster ====
Team Falcons Rainbow Six Siege roster
Players
Coaches

Handle	Name	Nationality
Likefac	Mariano, Théo	France
Solotov	Türker, Fatih	Turkey
BriD	Chongthep, Loïc	France
Jume	Steinmann, Marc	Germany
Yuzus	Pritchard, Josh	United Kingdom

Head coach

Julio "Julio" Giacomelli

Legend:
- (I) Inactive
- (S) Suspended
- Substitute
- (injured) Injury / Illness

Latest roster transaction: April 5, 2025.

=== Valorant ===
In 2022, Falcons won the inaugural Valorant MENA League, which was held in Riyadh and organized as a partnership between the Saudi Esports Federation and Valorant's developer, Riot Games.

=== PUBG ===
On the morning of January 15, 2025, Soniqs announced the departure of their highly successful PUBG roster. Finally, the former Soniqs players were announced as the new Falcons PUBG lineup later that day.

=== Trackmania ===
In January 2026, when Trackmania was announced to be one of the participating games at the Esports World Cup as part of a multi-year contract, Falcons quickly signed the most successful Trackmania player, 7-time World Champion CarlJr. In February, Falcons also signed Spammiej as their Coach.

=== Crossfire ===
Team Falcons Crossfire roster
Players
Coaches

Handle	Name	Nationality
Shady	Mai Thanh Phong	Vietnam
Dola	Đàm Việt Hưng	Vietnam
Carot	Nguyễn Trung Khang	Vietnam
Danxy	Nguyễn Bảo Duy	Vietnam
LDX	Lương Đức Tuấn	Vietnam
MakeyT	Phạm Thanh Tùng	Vietnam
Lucas (I)	Lê Văn Sơn	Vietnam

Head coach

- Ngô "JERRYz" Duy Anh (Vietnam)

Legend:
- (I) Inactive
- (S) Suspended
- Substitute
- (injured) Injury / Illness

Roster updated 20 April 2026.

=== Chess ===
On February 17, 2025, the org signed chess grandmaster Hikaru Nakamura, and on March 1, 2025, Falcons signed Alireza Firouzja.

Awards and achievements
Preceded by Team Liquid	The International winner 2025; With: skiter, Malr1ne, ATF, Cr1t, Sneyking, and Aui_2000 (coach)	Succeeded by TBD
Preceded by StarLadder Budapest Major 2025; Team Vitality	IEM Cologne Major 2026 winner 2026; With: karrigan, NiKo, m0NESY, TeSeS, kyousuke	Succeeded by PGL Singapore Major 2026; TBD
Preceded by 2025 Rocket League Championship Series; NRG Esports	Rocket League Championship Series World Champion; 2026; With: dralli, Kiileerrz, Rw9	Succeeded by TBD; TBD
