= 2025 Esports World Cup – Valorant =

Valorant tournament at the 2025 Esports World Cup

Valorant at the 2025 Esports World Cup
Tournament information
- Game: Valorant
- Location: Riyadh, Saudi Arabia
- Date: July 8–13, 2025
- Administrator: Esports World Cup Foundation; Supervised by ESL and sanctioned by Riot Games
- Tournament format(s): 16 team GSL-style group stage 8 team single-elimination bracket
- Teams: 16
- Purse: US$1,250,000
- Website: https://esportsworldcup.com/en/competitions/2025/valorant

Final positions
- Champions: Team Heretics
- Runner-up: Fnatic
- MVP: Mert "Wo0t" Alkan (Team Heretics)

The first-person tactical hero shooter video game Valorant had a tournament at the 2025 Esports World Cup in Riyadh, Saudi Arabia, from July 8 to 13, 2025. Sixteen teams took part in this tournament – two each from Stage 1 of the Valorant Champions Tour in the Americas, China, EMEA, and the Pacific, as well as two each from qualification events in the same regions. Teams qualified based on their performance in these tournaments.

It was the first Valorant tournament at the Esports World Cup, which is part of a three-year partnership between game developer Riot Games and the Esports World Cup Foundation until 2027 to bring Valorant, League of Legends, and Teamfight Tactics into the event.

Team Heretics won the tournament after beating Fnatic in the final, 3–2, in a reverse sweep after being down two maps.

== Format ==
In the group stage, the sixteen (16) teams were divided into four groups and competed in a GSL-style double elimination bracket, with the first two teams to achieve two wins advancing to the quarterfinals. The opening matches were best-of-ones but the remaining matches were best-of-threes

The playoffs were an eight-team single-elimination bracket. The teams that lost in the semifinals will compete in a third-place match. All matches in the playoffs were best-of-threes but the final was a best-of-five.

== Qualification ==
Teams qualified through their placements in Stage 1 of the Valorant Champions Tour in the Americas, China, EMEA, and the Pacific, two each from Americas, EMEA, and Pacific qualifiers, and two from Act 2 of the China Evolution Series.

=== Qualified teams ===
(*) Non-partner teams in franchise system

| Region | Stage 2 Winner | Stage 2 Runners-up |
|---|---|---|
| Americas | G2 Esports* | Sentinels |
| China | XLG Esports* | Bilibili Gaming |
| EMEA | Fnatic | Team Heretics |
| Pacific | Rex Regum Qeon | Gen.G |
| Event | Winner | Runners-up |
| Americas Qualifier | NRG Esports | 100 Thieves |
| China Evolution Series | Edward Gaming | Titan Esports Club |
| EMEA Qualifier | BBL Esports | Karmine Corp |
| Pacific Qualifier | Paper Rex | DRX |

== Draw ==
A draw was conducted for the group stage on 25 June 2025. In each group, one team in each region was placed.

| Group A | Group B | Group C | Group D |
|---|---|---|---|
| G2 Esports | XLG Esports | Rex Regum Qeon | Fnatic |
| Bilibili Gaming | Sentinels | Team Heretics | Gen.G |
| Paper Rex | BBL Esports | NRG Esports | Edward Gaming |
| Karmine Corp | DRX | Titan Esports Club | 100 Thieves |

== Group stage ==
- Dates: 8–10 July 2025
- Sixteen teams were drawn into four groups of four teams each. Teams from the same region cannot be placed in the same group.
- Double elimination; opening matches are best-of-one; all other matches best-of-three.
- The eight teams consisting of the winners and runners-up of each group advance to the Playoff Stage. Remaining teams are eliminated.

=== Group A ===
Opening Match
8 July, 12:00 AST
Paper Rex | 1
Bilibili Gaming | 0
8 July, 12:00 AST
G2 Esports | 0
Karmine Corp | 1
Elimination Match
9 July, 12:00 AST
G2 Esports | 1
Bilibili Gaming | 2

Winners Match
8 July, 16:00 AST
Paper Rex | 2
Karmine Corp | 0
Decider Match
10 July, 12:00 AST
Karmine Corp | 2
Bilibili Gaming | 1

Playoffs Qualified
Paper Rex
Karmine Corp

| Opening Match | 8 July | Paper Rex | 1 | – | 0 | Bilibili Gaming | Riyadh, Saudi Arabia |
| | 12:00 (UTC+3) | | | | | | |
| | | 16 | Lotus | | | 14 | |

| Opening Match | 8 July | G2 Esports | 0 | – | 1 | Karmine Corp | Riyadh, Saudi Arabia |
| | 12:00 (UTC+3) | | | | | | |
| | | 6 | Sunset | | | 13 | |

| Winners' Match | 8 July | Paper Rex | 2 | – | 0 | Karmine Corp | Riyadh, Saudi Arabia |
| | 16:00 (UTC+3) | | | | | | |
| | | 13 | Lotus | | | 10 | |
| | | 13 | Icebox | | | 5 | |
| | | | ~~Sunset~~ | | | | |

| Elimination Match | 9 July | G2 Esports | 1 | – | 2 | Bilibili Gaming | Riyadh, Saudi Arabia |
| | 12:00 (UTC+3) | | | | | | |
| | | 3 | Sunset | | | 13 | |
| | | 13 | Pearl | | | 4 | |
| | | 11 | Icebox | | | 13 | |

| Decider Match | 10 July | Karmine Corp | 2 | – | 1 | Bilibili Gaming | Riyadh, Saudi Arabia |
| | 12:00 (UTC+3) | | | | | | |
| | | 13 | Icebox | | | 5 | |
| | | 11 | Lotus | | | 13 | |
| | | 13 | Sunset | | | 9 | |

=== Group B ===
Opening Match
8 July, 13:00 AST
Sentinels | 0
BBL Esports | 1
8 July, 13:00 AST
DRX | 1
XLG Esports | 0
Elimination Match
9 July, 12:00 AST
Sentinels | 2
XLG Esports | 1

Winners Match
8 July, 16:00 AST
BBL Esports | 2
DRX | 0
Decider Match
10 July, 12:00 AST
DRX | 0
Sentinels | 2

Playoffs Qualified
BBL Esports
Sentinels

| Opening Match | 8 July | Sentinels | 0 | – | 1 | BBL Esports | Riyadh, Saudi Arabia |
| | 13:00 (UTC+3) | | | | | | |
| | | 12 | Icebox | | | 14 | |

| Opening Match | 8 July | DRX | 1 | – | 0 | XLG Esports | Riyadh, Saudi Arabia |
| | 13:00 (UTC+3) | | | | | | |
| | | 13 | Haven | | | 6 | |

| Winners' Match | 8 July | BBL Esports | 2 | – | 0 | DRX | Riyadh, Saudi Arabia |
| | 16:00 (UTC+3) | | | | | | |
| | | 12 | Sunset | | | 14 | |
| | | 6 | Ascent | | | 13 | |
| | | | ~~Haven~~ | | | | |

| Elimination Match | 9 July | Sentinels | 2 | – | 1 | XLG Esports | Riyadh, Saudi Arabia |
| | 12:00 (UTC+3) | | | | | | |
| | | 9 | Lotus | | | 13 | |
| | | 13 | Sunset | | | 8 | |
| | | 9 | Haven | | | 13 | |

| Decider Match | 10 July | DRX | 0 | – | 2 | Sentinels | Riyadh, Saudi Arabia |
| | 12:00 (UTC+3) | | | | | | |
| | | 7 | Lotus | | | 13 | |
| | | 4 | Sunset | | | 13 | |
| | | | ~~Haven~~ | | | | |

=== Group C ===
Opening Match
8 July, 14:00 AST
NRG Esports | 1
Team Heretics | 0
8 July, 14:00 AST
Rex Regum Qeon | 1
Titan Esports Club | 0
Elimination Match
9 July, 15:15 AST
Team Heretics | 2
Titan Esports Club | 1

Winners Match
8 July, 19:15 AST
NRG Esports | 2
Rex Regum Qeon | 0
Decider Match
10 July, 15:05 AST
Rex Regum Qeon | 0
Team Heretics | 2

Playoffs Qualified
NRG Esports
Team Heretics

| Opening Match | 8 July | NRG Esports | 1 | – | 0 | Team Heretics | Riyadh, Saudi Arabia |
| | 14:00 (UTC+3) | | | | | | |
| | | 13 | Lotus | | | 4 | |

| Opening Match | 8 July | Rex Regum Qeon | 1 | – | 0 | Titan Esports Club | Riyadh, Saudi Arabia |
| | 14:00 (UTC+3) | | | | | | |
| | | 13 | Sunset | | | 6 | |

| Winners' Match | 8 July | NRG Esports | 2 | – | 0 | Rex Regum Qeon | Riyadh, Saudi Arabia |
| | 19:15 (UTC+3) | | | | | | |
| | | 13 | Split | | | 7 | |
| | | 13 | Pearl | | | 8 | |
| | | | ~~Icebox~~ | | | | |

| Elimination Match | 9 July | Team Heretics | 2 | – | 1 | Titan Esports Club | Riyadh, Saudi Arabia |
| | 15:15 (UTC+3) | | | | | | |
| | | 10 | Icebox | | | 13 | |
| | | 14 | Haven | | | 12 | |
| | | 13 | Sunset | | | 6 | |

| Decider Match | 10 July | Rex Regum Qeon | 0 | – | 2 | Team Heretics | Riyadh, Saudi Arabia |
| | 15:05 (UTC+3) | | | | | | |
| | | 3 | Sunset | | | 13 | |
| | | 13 | Icebox | | | 15 | |
| | | | ~~Ascent~~ | | | | |

=== Group D ===
Opening Match
8 July, 15:00 AST
Gen.G | 1
Edward Gaming | 0
8 July, 15:00 AST
100 Thieves | 0
Fnatic | 1
Elimination Match
9 July, 15:15 AST
100 Thieves | 1
Edward Gaming | 2

Winners Match
8 July, 19:15 AST
Gen.G | 0
Fnatic | 2
Decider Match
10 July, 15:15 AST
Gen.G | 2
Edward Gaming | 0

Playoffs Qualified
Fnatic
Gen.G

| Opening Match | 8 July | Gen.G | 1 | – | 0 | Edward Gaming | Riyadh, Saudi Arabia |
| | 15:00 (UTC+3) | | | | | | |
| | | 13 | Icebox | | | 4 | |

| Opening Match | 8 July | 100 Thieves | 0 | – | 1 | Fnatic | Riyadh, Saudi Arabia |
| | 15:00 (UTC+3) | | | | | | |
| | | 11 | Icebox | | | 13 | |

| Winners' Match | 8 July | Gen.G | 0 | – | 2 | Fnatic | Riyadh, Saudi Arabia |
| | 19:15 (UTC+3) | | | | | | |
| | | 13 | Ascent | | | 15 | |
| | | 7 | Icebox | | | 13 | |
| | | | ~~Sunset~~ | | | | |

| Elimination Match | 9 July | 100 Thieves | 1 | – | 2 | Edward Gaming | Riyadh, Saudi Arabia |
| | 15:15 (UTC+3) | | | | | | |
| | | 13 | Haven | | | 11 | |
| | | 7 | Sunset | | | 13 | |
| | | 10 | Ascent | | | 13 | |

| Decider Match | 10 July | Gen.G | 2 | – | 0 | Edward Gaming | Riyadh, Saudi Arabia |
| | 15:15 (UTC+3) | | | | | | |
| | | 13 | Lotus | | | 8 | |
| | | 13 | Haven | | | 4 | |
| | | | ~~Icebox~~ | | | | |

== Playoffs ==
- Dates: 11–13 July 2025
- Eight teams were drawn into matchups based on a draw
- Single elimination; matches in quarterfinals and semifinals are best-of-three series.
- Grand Final will be best-of-five

Quarterfinals
11 July, 12:00 AST
Sentinels | 0
Paper Rex | 2
11 July, 12:00 AST
Karmine Corp | 0
Fnatic | 2
11 July, 14:30 AST
NRG Esports | 0
Gen.G | 2
11 July, 15:15 AST
BBL Esports | 0
Team Heretics | 2

Semifinals
12 July, 12:00 AST
Paper Rex | 1
Fnatic | 2
12 July, 15:40 AST
Gen.G | 1
Team Heretics | 2

Final
13 July, 13:30 AST
Fnatic | 2
Team Heretics | 3
Third place
13 July, 12:00 AST
Paper Rex | 0
Gen.G | 2

| Quarterfinals | 11 July | Sentinels | 0 | – | 2 | Paper Rex | Riyadh, Saudi Arabia |
| | 12:00 (UTC+3) | | | | | | |
| | | 3 | Icebox | | | 13 | |
| | | 9 | Sunset | | | 13 | |
| | | | ~~Lotus~~ | | | | |

| Quarterfinals | 11 July | Karmine Corp | 0 | – | 2 | Fnatic | Riyadh, Saudi Arabia |
| | 12:00 (UTC+3) | | | | | | |
| | | 12 | Sunset | | | 14 | |
| | | 7 | Ascent | | | 13 | |
| | | | ~~Icebox~~ | | | | |

| Quarterfinals | 11 July | NRG Esports | 0 | – | 2 | Gen.G | Riyadh, Saudi Arabia |
| | 14:30 (UTC+3) | | | | | | |
| | | 5 | Sunset | | | 13 | |
| | | 10 | Icebox | | | 13 | |
| | | | ~~Lotus~~ | | | | |

| Quarterfinals | 11 July | BBL Esports | 0 | – | 2 | Team Heretics | Riyadh, Saudi Arabia |
| | 15:15 (UTC+3) | | | | | | |
| | | 3 | Ascent | | | 13 | |
| | | 5 | Haven | | | 13 | |
| | | | ~~Icebox~~ | | | | |

| Semifinals | 11 July | Paper Rex | 1 | – | 2 | Fnatic | Riyadh, Saudi Arabia |
| | 12:00 (UTC+3) | | | | | | |
| | | 13 | Sunset | | | 10 | |
| | | 3 | Ascent | | | 13 | |
| | | 8 | Split | | | 13 | |

| Semifinals | 12 July | Gen.G | 1 | – | 2 | Team Heretics | Riyadh, Saudi Arabia |
| | 15:40 (UTC+3) | | | | | | |
| | | 7 | Ascent | | | 13 | |
| | | 13 | Haven | | | 8 | |
| | | 14 | Lotus | | | 16 | |

| Third Place Playoff | 13 July | Paper Rex | 0 | – | 2 | Gen.G | Riyadh, Saudi Arabia |
| | 12:00 (UTC+3) | | | | | | |
| | | 10 | Sunset | | | 13 | |
| | | 8 | Ascent | | | 13 | |
| | | | ~~Lotus~~ | | | | |

| Grand Final | 13 July | Fnatic | 2 | – | 3 | Team Heretics | Riyadh, Saudi Arabia |
| | 13:30 (UTC+3) | | | | | | |
| | | 13 | Lotus | | | 4 | |
| | | 13 | Sunset | | | 1 | |
| | | 11 | Icebox | | | 13 | |
| | | 10 | Haven | | | 13 | |
| | | 10 | Ascent | | | 13 | |

== Ranking ==
A base prize pool of US$1,250,000 was offered for the tournament. The prize pool is spread among the teams as seen below:

| Place | Team | Prize (USD) |
|---|---|---|
| 1st | Team Heretics | $500,000 |
| 2nd | Fnatic | $230,000 |
| 3rd | Gen.G | $130,000 |
| 4th | Paper Rex | $70,000 |
| 5th–8th | Sentinels | $40,000 |
| 5th–8th | Karmine Corp | $40,000 |
| 5th–8th | NRG Esports | $40,000 |
| 5th–8th | BBL Esports | $40,000 |
| 9th–12th | Bilibili Gaming | $25,000 |
| 9th–12th | DRX | $25,000 |
| 9th–12th | Rex Regum Qeon | $25,000 |
| 9th–12th | Edward Gaming | $25,000 |
| 13th–16th | G2 Esports | $15,000 |
| 13th–16th | XLG Esports | $15,000 |
| 13th–16th | Titan Esports Club | $15,000 |
| 13th–16th | 100 Thieves | $15,000 |
