= 2025 Esports World Cup – Teamfight Tactics =

Teamfight Tactics tournament at the 2025 Esports World Cup

Teamfight Tactics at the 2025 Esports World Cup
Tournament information
- Sport: Teamfight Tactics
- Location: Riyadh, Saudi Arabia
- Dates: August 11–15
- Administrator: Esports World Cup Foundation; Supervised by ESL and sanctioned by Riot Games
- Tournament format(s): 16 team GSL-style group stage 8 team single-elimination bracket
- Teams: 16

Final positions
- Champion: Weibo Gaming
- Runner-up: Virtus.pro

The auto battler game Teamfight Tactics had a tournament at the 2025 Esports World Cup in Riyadh, Saudi Arabia, from August 11 to 15, 2025. Sixteen teams took part in this tournament, six from the Asian Champions League (ACL) qualifiers (three each from Asia-Pacific and China), three each from the Americas and EMEA, three from the global qualifiers, and Wolves Esports, the defending champions. Teams qualified based on their performance from regional qualification events and the global qualifier. Weibo Gaming won the tournament, with Virtus.pro placing second.

This event was the second Teamfight Tactics tournament at the EWC and the first under a three-year partnership between game developer Riot Games and the Esports World Cup Foundation until 2027 to bring Teamfight Tactics, League of Legends, and Valorant into the event.

== Format ==
In the group stage, the sixteen (16) teams are divided into four groups and compete in a GSL-style double elimination bracket, with the first two teams to achieve two wins advancing to the quarterfinals. All tournament matches are best-of-threes, whereas the final was a best-of-five.

The playoffs consisted of an eight-team single-elimination bracket.

== Qualification ==
2024 tournament winners Wolves Esports automatically qualified for the 2025 edition by virtue of being defending champions. There are six qualified teams from Asia, all of whom also qualified for the Asian Champions League (ACL) – three each from Asia-Pacific (APAC) and China. Three teams each from the Americas and EMEA qualifiers and three teams from the global qualifiers also advanced to the main tournament.

=== Qualified teams ===
Region	Event	Team	Path
Americas	AMER Closed Qualifier	Team Vitality	Upper Bracket Final Winner
Americas	AMER Closed Qualifier	Team Liquid	Lower Bracket finalists
Americas	AMER Closed Qualifier	Citadel Gaming	Lower Bracket finalists
Asia-Pacific	ACL Asia-Pacific Qualifiers	Flash Wolves	Upper Bracket finalists
Asia-Pacific	ACL Asia-Pacific Qualifiers	T1	Upper Bracket finalists
Asia-Pacific	ACL Asia-Pacific Qualifiers	Virtus.pro	Third-ranked team
China	none	Wolves Esports	EWC 2024 Champions
China	ACL China Qualifiers	Team Falcons	Qualifiers 1st Place
China	ACL China Qualifiers	Weibo Gaming	Qualifiers 2nd Place
China	ACL China Qualifiers	Twisted Minds	Qualifiers 3rd Place
EMEA	EMEA Closed Qualifier	Aegis Esports	Upper Bracket Final Winner
EMEA	EMEA Closed Qualifier	Fnatic	Lower Bracket finalists
EMEA	EMEA Closed Qualifier	EVOS Esports	Lower Bracket finalists
none	Global Qualifiers	MOUZ	Stage 2 Semifinal winners
none	Global Qualifiers	ROC Esports	Stage 2 Semifinal winners
none	Global Qualifiers	Al Qadsiah Esports	3rd Place decider winner
