= 2025 Rocket League Championship Series =

Esports competition

- RLCS 2025 Logo

Tournament information
- Game: Rocket League
- Dates: 3 January 2025–14 September 2025

Birmingham Major
- Location: Birmingham, England
- Dates: 27 March–30 March
- Venue: BP Pulse Live Arena
- Champion: Karmine Corp
- Runner-up: The Ultimates

Raleigh Major
- Location: Raleigh, North Carolina
- Dates: 26 June–29 June
- Venue: Lenovo Center
- Champion: Team Falcons
- Runner-up: Dignitas

Rocket League World Championship
- Location: Lyon, France
- Dates: 10 September–14 September
- Venue: LDLC Arena
- Champion: NRG Esports
- Runner-up: Team Falcons

The 2025 Rocket League Championship Series was the 14th edition of the Rocket League Championship Series (RLCS), the premier official Rocket League competition. The season began on 3 January 2025, and concluded on 14 September 2025. It was the first season to have a 1v1 series, which ran alongside the traditional 3v3 series.

== Birmingham Major ==
The RLCS Birmingham Major took place from 27 March to 30 March, with the qualification phase taking place from 3 January to 2 March. The tournament was played in Birmingham, England.

Karmine Corp, consisting of Vatira, Atow, Dralii, and coach Ferra, won the competition, defeating The Ultimates in the final. They claimed their second Major title as an organisation, as well as player Vatira’s record-breaking third Major title.

The first ever 1v1 final was played on 29 March, with qualification for that going on from 28 February to 9 March. Mawkzy from Europe played yANXNZ from South America and won 4-3, progressing to the 1v1 World Championship Grand Final.

=== Playoffs ===
Karmine Corp, NRG Esports, Team Vitality and The Ultimates qualified through the Upper Bracket. Team Falcons, FURIA, Geekay Esports and Twisted Minds qualified through the Lower Bracket.

Round 1
29 March, bp PULSE LIVE
1	NRG Esports	2
4	Karmine Corp	4
29 March, bp PULSE LIVE
5	Geekay Esports	0
8	Team Falcons	4
29 March, bp PULSE LIVE
6	Twisted Minds	1
7	FURIA	4
29 March, bp PULSE LIVE
2	The Ultimates	4
3	Team Vitality	2

Quarterfinals
30 March, bp PULSE LIVE
NRG Esports	4
Team Falcons	3
30 March, bp PULSE LIVE
FURIA	4
Team Vitality	3

Semifinals
30 March, bp PULSE LIVE
Karmine Corp	4
FURIA	0
30 March, bp PULSE LIVE
The Ultimates	4
NRG Esports	3

Grand Final
30 March, bp PULSE LIVE
Karmine Corp	4
The Ultimates	0

== Raleigh Major ==
The RLCS Raleigh Major took place from 26 June to 29 June, with the qualification phase taking place from 18 April to 1 June. The tournament was played in Raleigh, North Carolina.

Team Falcons, consisting of Kiileerrz, Rw9, Trk511 and d7oom-24 as coach, won the trophy, with it being MENA's first time winning an RLCS LAN. Dignitas, consisting of ApparentlyJack, Joreuz, stizzy and ViolentPanda as coach, also reached their first LAN final since the Season 6 World Championship in November 2018, in which they lost to Cloud9. The winner of the previous event, Karmine Corp, going in as the favorite, went out 7th-8th in an upset loss to Twisted Minds, getting reverse swept in that series.

In the Raleigh Major, the 1v1 final was played on 28 June, with qualification for that on May 29 to June 8. Nwpo from MENA played diaz from South America (qualified in the North American tournament) and won 4-1, progressing to the 1v1 World Championship Grand Final against Mawkzy.

=== Playoffs ===
Team Vitality, NRG Esports, Team Falcons and Dignitas qualified through the Upper Bracket. Team Secret, Karmine Corp, Twisted Minds and Gentle Mates qualified through the Lower Bracket.

Round 1
28 June, Lenovo Center
1	NRG Esports	0
4	Team Vitality	4
28 June, Lenovo Center
5	Karmine Corp	3
8	Twisted Minds	4
28 June, Lenovo Center
6	Gentle Mates	2
7	Team Secret	4
28 June, Lenovo Center
2	Team Falcons	4
3	Dignitas	0

Quarterfinals
29 June, Lenovo Center
NRG Esports	4
Twisted Minds	3
29 June, Lenovo Center
Team Secret	0
Dignitas	4

Semifinals
29 June, Lenovo Center
Team Vitality	1
Dignitas	4
29 June, Lenovo Center
Team Falcons	4
NRG Esports	2

Grand Final
29 June, Lenovo Center
Dignitas	1
Team Falcons	4

== Rocket League World Championship ==
The Rocket League World Championship took place from 10 September to 14 September, with the last chance qualification phase having taken place from 12 July to 10 August. The tournament was played in Lyon, France.

NRG Esports, consisting of Atomic, BeastMode, Daniel and Satthew as coach, won the Championship. Notably, Team Falcons became MENA's first team to reach the finals of a World Championship. This marked the first World Championship grand final without a European team, as Karmine Corp and Geekay Esports were eliminated in the semifinals.

The 1v1 World Championship was played on 13 September with the qualification stages being on 29 March and 28 June. Mawkzy, the winner of the Birmingham Major and Nwpo, the winner of the Raleigh Major, played in the final, in which Nwpo triumphed 4-1.

=== Playoffs ===
Team Falcons, NRG Esports, Wildcard and The Ultimates qualified through the Upper Bracket. Karmine Corp, Ninjas in Pyjamas, Geekay Esports and Spacestation Gaming would qualify through the Lower Bracket.

Round 1
13 September, LDLC Arena
1	Wildcard	1
4	Team Falcons	4
13 September, LDLC Arena
5	Spacestation Gaming	1
8	Geekay Esports	4
13 September, LDLC Arena
6	Ninjas in Pyjamas	2
7	Karmine Corp	4
13 September, LDLC Arena
2	NRG Esports	4
3	The Ultimates	3

Quarterfinals
14 September, LDLC Arena
Wildcard	1
Geekay Esports	4
14 September, LDLC Arena
Karmine Corp	4
The Ultimates	0

Semifinals
14 September, LDLC Arena
Karmine Corp	2
Team Falcons	4
14 September, LDLC Arena
NRG Esports	4
Geekay Esports	0

Grand Final
14 September, LDLC Arena
Team Falcons	1
NRG Esports	4
