= Esports Nations Cup =

Upcoming biennial national team esports tournament

- The official logo of the tournament

Tournament information
- Sport: Esports
- Location: Riyadh, Saudi Arabia (2027)
- Month played: November
- Administrator: Esports Foundation
- Tournament format(s): National teams; qualification via global rankings, regional qualifiers, wildcards and solidarity slots
- Participants: National teams from North America, South America, Europe, MENA, Africa, Asia, Southeast Asia & Oceania
- Website: esportsnationscup.com

Most recent tournament
- 2027 Esports Nations Cup

Esports Nations Cup (ENC) is an upcoming international multi-title esports tournament focused on representative national esports teams. The event is organised by the Riyadh-based Esports Foundation (EF), a non-profit organization, and is planned to be held every two years. It was announced during the New Global Sport Conference in Riyadh in late August 2025, with the inaugural finals scheduled for November 2027 (initially November 2026) in Riyadh before rotating to other host cities. The first edition is being co-developed with online chess platform Chess.com and video-game publishers Electronic Arts, Krafton, Moonton, SNK, Tencent and Ubisoft.

== History and announcement ==
The Esports Nations Cup was announced during the New Global Sports Conference, held in Riyadh, Saudi Arabia, in August 2025, with the inaugural edition set for November 2026 in Riyadh. Initial expectations stated that more than 1,500 players from over 100 nations would be taking part across roughly 15 titles. It would be held on a biannual schedule under a rotating hosting model.

Following the announcement of the Esports Nations Cup, the inaugural edition would later be announced to have a total of 16 titles. Mobile Legends: Bang Bang was the first title revealed for ENC on 25 January 2026, during the M7 World Championship in Jakarta, Indonesia.

On 18 August 2026, the Esports Foundation announced that the inaugural Esports Nations Cup would be postponed to November 2027 in response to the 2026 Iran war. By the time of the announcement, almost all titles had finished their respective qualifiers.

The Nations Cup follows the expansion of the Esports World Cup, the flagship competition organized by the Esports World Cup Foundation (later renamed to the Esports Foundation) as well as similar competitions held in the past that focused on nation-based esports competition, such as the Electronic Sports World Cup (ESWC), IESF World Championships and World Cyber Games (WCG).

== Format ==
The Esports Nations Cup features national teams from seven defined regions — North America, South America, Europe, the MENA region, Africa, Asia and Southeast Asia & Oceania. These nations are represented by partner organizations or individuals, which can include but are not limited to national esports and traditional sports organizations, individual esports clubs, non-governmental organizations and agencies. Qualification uses a multi-layered pathway combining global rankings, regional qualifiers, wildcards and solidarity placements, with 50% of each tournament having automatic qualifiers and rosters for each title required to not have a supermajority of players from a single club. One regional wildcard slot is given for most titles to allow the entry of the best team from a specific region (the Gulf Cooperation Council (GCC) in the case of the postponed 2026 edition) that didn't qualify to the event. Players receive guaranteed prize money with equal placement rewards across games, with the winners receiving $50,000 per player per title. The event will run biennially, debuting in Riyadh in November 2027 before moving to a rotating host model. The inaugural edition is being co-developed with Electronic Arts, Krafton, Moonton, SNK, Tencent and Ubisoft, alongside the online chess platform Chess.com.

== Featured games ==
16 games were set to be featured in the 2026 edition of the event, with the final game revealed on 7 April 2026. It is unknown which of the 16 titles will be used in 2027.

Game/Series	~~2026~~
Apex Legends	✓
Chess	✓
Counter-Strike 2	✓
Dota 2	✓
EA Sports FC	✓
Fatal Fury: City of the Wolves	✓
Honor of Kings	✓
League of Legends	✓
Mobile Legends: Bang Bang	✓
PUBG: Battlegrounds	✓
PUBG Mobile	✓
Rainbow Six Siege	✓
Rocket League	✓
Street Fighter 6	✓
Trackmania	✓
Valorant	✓
Total games	16

== Reception and controversy ==
An analysis by Mike Stubbs argued that a nation-versus-nation format could "actually make national competition work" in esports if execution and game selection align with fan interest. Sheep Esports welcomed the concept but noted that key details—such as the final list of games, qualification specifics and national team governance—had not yet been fully disclosed at launch.

=== South Korea selection controversy ===
In March 2026, as part of the National Team Partner selection process, the Korea e-Sports Association (KeSPA) was selected as the National Team Partner for South Korea at the planned 2026 edition in Riyadh. This gave KeSPA full rights to select South Korea's coaches and rosters for each title at the event. However, in an April 2026 report in Seoul Sport, it was revealed that the Esports Foundation had requested to include certain players onto South Korea's rosters for select titles. KeSPA would stand by its own selection process and go against requests made by the Esports Foundation. The Korean Sport & Olympic Committee (KSOC) would further state that athletes that weren't selected via official means, like through KeSPA, would be barred from competing under the Korean flag or being called "national representatives". Ultimately, in a statement published to numerous outlets, it was announced that the Esports Foundation would not move forward with KeSPA as the National Team Partner for South Korea. The Esports Foundation and KeSPA would later agree on the latter's return to the Esports Nations Cup.

== See also ==
- Esports World Cup
- List of esports leagues and tournaments
- List of esports games
- Sport in Saudi Arabia
