= Esports Foundation =

Saudi esport organization

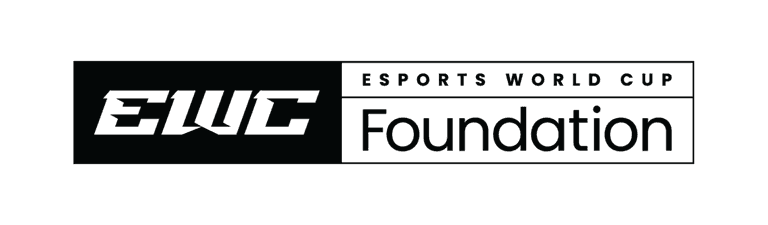
- Former logo as the Esports World Cup Foundation (EWCF)
- Abbreviation: EF
- Founded: 23 October 2023; 3 years ago
- Founder: Mohammed bin Salman
- Type: Nonprofit organization
- Purpose: Development and growth of esports
- Headquarters: Riyadh, Saudi Arabia
- Region served: Worldwide
- Services: Organizing the Esports World Cup and Esports Nations Cup
- Key people: Mohammed bin Salman (Chair of the Board of Trustees); Ralf Reichert (CEO); Mike McCabe (COO)
- Parent organization: Public Investment Fund
- Employees: 100–200
- Website: esportsworldcup.com

The Esports Foundation (EF) (formerly the Esports World Cup Foundation (EWCF)) is a Saudi Arabian nonprofit organization dedicated to the development and growth of the esports and gaming sectors. It serves as the primary organizer of the annual Esports World Cup, recognized as the largest professional esports event by total prize pool, and the national team-focused Esports Nations Cup.

== History ==
The EWCF was announced on July 30, 2023, by Mohammed bin Salman, Crown Prince of Saudi Arabia, as part of an initiative to position the kingdom as a global hub for esports under Saudi Vision 2030. It was formally established in September 2023 as a nonprofit funded by Saudi Arabia's Public Investment Fund. Operations for the Esports World Cup were transferred from the Saudi Esports Federation to the Foundation.

In October 2023, Ralf Reichert, a veteran in the esports industry and co-founder of ESL, was appointed as CEO of the EWCF. On September 3, 2025, Crown Prince Mohammed bin Salman was named chair of the board of trustees.

The organization renamed itself to the Esports Foundation on March 31, 2026, coinciding with the announcement of that year's Club Partner Program members. The renaming reflects the Foundation organizing the Esports Nations Cup alongside EWC.

== Purpose and mission ==
The Foundation's mission is to elevate esports as a global sport, empower players, and foster sustainable growth in the industry by advocating for players, fans, and businesses while ensuring financial stability through reinvestment of proceeds. It aims to shape a future where esports is celebrated alongside traditional sports like football and cricket.

== Activities ==
=== Esports World Cup ===
The EF's flagship event is the annual Esports World Cup (EWC), held in Riyadh from July to August. The 2024 edition featured a US$62.5 million prize pool across 22 game titles. The 2025 EWC, running from July 7 to August 24, expanded to 25 tournaments across 24 titles with a prize pool exceeding US$70 million, including US$27 million for the Club Championship. It attracted more than 2,000 players from over 100 countries and 200 clubs, with Team Falcons winning the 2025 Club Championship for a $7 million prize. Tournaments are supervised by the EF, with administration handled by ESL.

=== Club Partner Program ===
Launched as the Club Support Program, the Club Partner Program provides financial assistance to esports organizations based on competitive achievements, strategies, and fan engagement. In 2024, 30 clubs were selected; it expanded to 40 in 2025, distributing US$20 million directly to clubs. Participants must enhance viewership and engagement to remain eligible for rewards.

=== Esports Nations Cup ===
In August 2025, the EWCF announced the Esports Nations Cup, a global recurring national team competition in esports, set to launch in Riyadh in November 2027 (initially November 2026), partnering with publishers like Electronic Arts, Krafton, Tencent, and Ubisoft. National teams are represented by partner organizations and individuals, including national esports and traditional sports organizations and non-governmental organizations.

=== Other initiatives ===
The Foundation launched Esports Spotlight, a YouTube channel featuring esports professionals, creators, and celebrities.

In 2025, the EWCF became the Founding Partner for the inaugural Olympic Esports Games in Riyadh in 2027, partnering with the International Olympic Committee (IOC) to bridge esports and traditional sports, including game selection and qualification pathways. However, talks broke down between the two organizations in October, likely as a result of the formation of the Esports Nations Cup, leading to the EWCF pulling out of the Olympic Esports Games entirely.

== Organization ==
The EF is headquartered in Riyadh and employs between 100 to 200 people. Events are held at venues in Riyadh's Boulevard City, including the SEF Arena and stc Play Gaming Hall. The Foundation oversees a trophy system for the EWC Club Championship, designed by Thomas Lyte.

== Criticism ==
The EF and the Esports World Cup have faced criticism for serving as a form of sportswashing by the Saudi government to divert attention from human rights issues, including restrictions on LGBTQ+ rights, women's rights, and freedom of expression. This has led to withdrawals by teams such as Ex Oblivione (2024), ChrisCCH (2025), and GeoGuessr (2025).

The EF was later alleged to have interfered with the selection process for South Korea's rosters at the planned 2026 Esports Nations Cup in Riyadh by pushing some players to represent the country in select titles. The move, which went against the selection process done by the Korea e-Sports Association (KeSPA), South Korea's appointed "National Team Partner", ultimately led to the Foundation removing KeSPA from the partner role. The Esports Foundation and KeSPA would later agree on the latter's return to the Esports Nations Cup.
