= Saudi Esports Federation =

Governing body for esports in Saudi Arabia

Saudi Esports Federation الاتحاد السعودي للرياضات الإلكترونية
- Formation: 13 October 2017; 9 years ago
- Founder: Council of Ministers of Saudi Arabia
- Purpose: National Body of Esports
- Headquarters: Riyadh, Saudi Arabia
- Chairman: Faisal bin Bandar Al Saud
- Deputy Chairman: Sara bint Faisal Al Saud
- CEO: Rawan AlButairi
- Key people: Salman bin Bandar; Fahad Alowaidah; Abdulaziz Alaqel
- Subsidiaries: Saudi eLeagues; SEF Awards
- Website: saudiesports.sa

The Saudi Esports Federation (SEF; Arabic: الاتحاد السعودي للرياضات الإلكترونية), or simply Saudi Esports, is the national body for esports (or competitive video gaming) in Saudi Arabia. It was established in October 2017 as part of Saudi Vision 2030.

== History ==
The Saudi Esports Federation was officially established on October 13, 2017 under the name "Saudi Arabian Federation for Electronic and Intellectual Sports" with Faisal bin Bandar as the chairman. On May 4, 2021 the esports federation was separated from the intellectual sports federation to be renamed the "Saudi Esports Federation”.

In March 2023, SEF-organized Gamers8 tournament announced the largest esports prize pool in history with $45 million for its 2023 event.

In October 2023, Crown Prince Mohammed bin Salman launched the Esports World Cup, an annual competition which includes the most popular games in the world and is replacing the Gamers8 tournament. The first world cup took place in 2024 and had the largest prize pool in esports history. The second edition of the Esports World Cup is scheduled to run from July 7 to August 25, 2025 and broke once again the record for the largest prize pool, which surpasses $70 million.
