= NRG Esports =

American esports organization

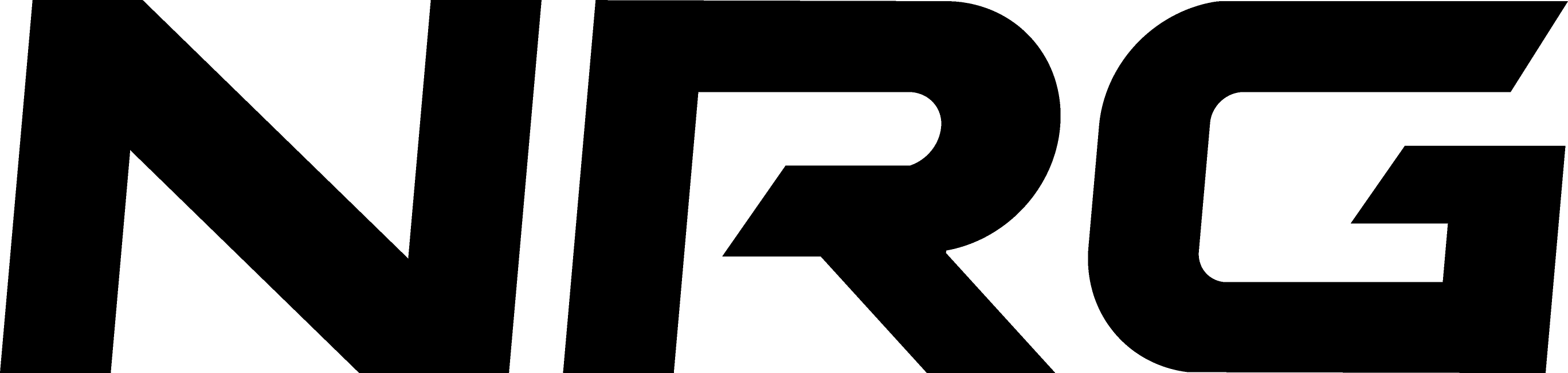
- Founded: November 2015
- Colors: Energized orange, black, offwhite, grey, core orange, surge orange, bone white
- Owner: DarkZero Esports
- CEO: Don Kim
- Divisions: Apex Legends; Counter-Strike 2 League of Legends; Marvel Rivals; Overwatch (San Francisco Shock); Rocket League; Valorant
- Website: www.nrg.gg

NRG Esports (or simply NRG) is an American esports organization based in Los Angeles, California. It has rosters in Overwatch, Rocket League, Valorant, Counter-Strike 2, Apex Legends, League of Legends, Marvel Rivals and a number of streamers on the internet platform Twitch.

== History ==
The team was founded by Sacramento Kings co-owners Mark Mastrov and Andy Miller in November 2015.

In March 2016, NRG announced that Alex Rodriguez, Shaquille O'Neal and Jimmy Rollins were joining as investors. On April 20, 2018, Tiesto was announced as an investor.

In August 2017, the Canadian esports company Northern Gaming was acquired by NRG. Northern Gaming's co-owners were rolled into NRG, making Twitch streamer Sodapoppin a named advisor and co-owner.

In September 2019, it was announced that Hector "H3CZ" Rodriguez had joined as co-CEO, after another announcement the same day that Hector and the Immortals Gaming Club had parted ways.

On August 24, 2020, Tubefilter announced that NRG partnered with Shots Studios, a Los Angeles-based production and management company, for content production, social strategy, and merchandising.

In 2021, NRG had a reported revenue of $28 million. The following year, its equity was a reported $240 million.

In April 2023, NRG acquired Counter Logic Gaming from Madison Square Garden Sports, and its League Championship Series (LCS) slot, returning to the league for the first time since 2016. This gave MSG Sports a non-controlling stake in NRG.

In September 2023, NRG announced the dissolution of their Apex Legends team, citing lack of support from EA for competitive Apex as the reason. They would, however, return to Apex on May 30, 2024, by signing the former XSET roster.

On May 6, 2024, the Esports World Cup Foundation, funded by the Saudi Arabia Public Investment Fund and organizers of the Esports World Cup tournament series, announced the 30 organizations (known in the EWC as Clubs) who would make up the Club Support Program, with NRG being one of them. This program gave teams a one-time six-figure stipend if an organization was willing to enter new esports as well as additional funding each year if they drove viewership and fan engagement to the Esports World Cup. NRG weren't accepted into the 2025 Esports World Cup Club Partner Program.

In October 2024, NRG and Spectrum announced a multi-year partnership, extending Spectrum's naming rights for the NRG Spectrum Castle in Los Angeles for three years. Spectrum's branding will appear on NRG's jerseys, with its services used at the LA headquarters and Culver City facility. The partnership includes an event series called "Storm the Castle" and activations under NRG's "Gaming Tour of America". Later that month, rumours from September that NRG would leave the LCS were officially confirmed, with the organisation disbanding its League of Legends team.

In November 2024, NRG announced that now retired GarrettG will still be in the organization as a Co-Owner and Content Creator.

On December 19, 2025, DarkZero Esports announced that they had acquired NRG, keeping the organization's branding. Andy Miller would step down as CEO in favor of DarkZero's Don Kim, becoming an advisor in a temporary role. In addition, almost all of DarkZero's rosters would transition into the NRG brand.

== Current divisions ==
=== Apex Legends ===
On February 11, 2019, NRG became one of the first organizations to sign a professional Apex Legends player with the signing of Coby "Dizzy" Meadows. The team signed Brandon "aceu" Winn and Marshall "Mohr" Mohr in March and May, respectively, to round out its three-player squad. Dizzy competed in the first-ever Apex Legends Pro-Am, securing 1st place, the tournament's MVP award, and a $23,000 charitable donation to the V Foundation. Following the retirement of Dizzy in December 2019, the team picked up their new talent Joseph "Frexs" Sanchez in the beginning of January, about a month later. On July 23, 2022, after the ALGS 2022: Championship, Aidan "rocker" Grodin announced his departure from the team. On August 13, the team signed Dennis "Gilderson" Zachary as their third teammate. On September 15, 2023, NRG announced their departure from Apex Legends.

On May 30, 2024, NRG announced the signing of the roster of ohNocturnal, FunFPS and reptar, once again reforming a roster under NRG.

In 2026 NRG announced the return to apex featuring SSS as new roster.

=== Overwatch ===
On August 3, 2016, NRG signed the members of the former Overwatch team from Luminosity Gaming. NRG owned the Overwatch League team San Francisco Shock from the OWL's inaugural season to its final season in 2023. NRG owned an Overwatch Contenders team competing as the Shock's academy team up until May 8, 2019, when they withdrew their participation in the tournament.

On May 31, 2024, after orgless team Students of the Game lost their first round matchup in the Overwatch Champions Series Dallas Major to Spacestation Gaming, it was announced that NRG had signed the roster, which would compete under the name NRG Shock, in reference to the former San Francisco Shock Overwatch League team.

=== Rocket League ===
NRG Esports signed the Kings of Urban roster after a strong finish in their region in the RLCS (Rocket League Championship Series) Season 1 in 2016. RLCS Season 2 saw NRG bow out of the RLCS finals after a loss to Flipsid3 Tactics which resulted in NRG finishing 5-6th. In the off-season, GarrettG was picked up from his former team Orbit, replacing Sadjunior. This new roster achieved a 3rd-place finish in the RLCS Season 3 finals, losing out to the eventual champions in Northern Gaming.

After a disappointing last-place finish in the RLCS Season 4 Finals, NRG dropped mainstay and fan-favorite Jacob for rookie prodigy jstn. With jstn, NRG came one goal away from becoming the Rocket League world champions in Season 5. After going undefeated in both regular season and the first two days of the RLCS tournament, NRG met Dignitas in the Grand Finals. Dignitas reset the bracket with a 4–1 win in the first best-of-seven, which meant one final series would crown the champs. In Game 7, NRG trailed by one goal in the final moments, but jstn scored a last-second goal to send the game into overtime, where they ultimately lost.

NRG would continue to dominate RLCS regional play in seasons 6 and 7, only to fall short of expectations at both finals. Several days after the end of Season 7, NRG legend Fireburner announced he was stepping away from competitive Rocket League. Nearly a month later, it was announced that three-time RLCS champion Turbopolsa, a member of the same Dignitas team that defeated NRG for the world title in season 5, would replace Fireburner, becoming the first player to make a cross-region move from Europe to North America. Months after Turbopolsa's move to North America, NRG Esports would finally go on to win the Rocket League World Championship series on December 15, 2019, beating Renault Vitality in a seven-game Grand Finals with jstn scoring the winning goal in overtime. They would then drop Turbopolsa in order to sign SquishyMuffinz, a player coming from the recently disbanded team Cloud9. With this roster, they went on to win RLCS X North American Championship, and lose in the Grand Finals of Fall Major RLCS 11 to Team BDS.

NRG qualified for the Winter Major as the number 1 seed from NA, they went 1–2 in groups and were placed in the lower bracket against the eventual runner ups Team Queso, which they lost. NRG failed to qualify for the Spring Major, this was the first time NRG failed to qualify for an RLCS international LAN, but they qualified for the RLCS 2021-2022 Finals wildcard in Fort Worth. Although they failed to qualify for the Spring Major they still had enough points to qualify for the Main Event in Fort Worth. Following Version 1's loss against Moist Esports, NRG qualified for the Main Event in Fort Worth as the 3rd seed from North America.

NRG struggled in the 2022-23 and 2024 seasons of RLCS. In the 2022–23 season, their top placement was 4th in the Fall and Spring Cup. This would inevitably cause the roster of GarrettG, SquishyMuffinz and jstn to split up, with Squishy forming The Muffin Men and jstn joining Shopify Rebellion. Garrett would continue to stay on NRG, with the team acquiring Mist and Frosty for the 2024 season. Frosty's time on the roster was short lived, as in under a month due to poor off-season results, Frosty would part from NRG on the 21st January 2024, with Toastie being the replacement. This team would go on to only get a maximum placement of 5th-8th during the 1st split of the 2024 season. Toastie was replaced by Aqua on the 17th of April. NRG would go on to get a maximum placement of 9th-11th during the 2nd split. The roster ultimately disbanded, with GarrettG staying on NRG as a co-owner and content creator.

On December 20, 2024, it was announced that NRG would be acquiring the legendary roster of Beastmode, Daniel and Atomic from G2 Esports (then known as G2 Stride) with Satthew as coach. The team won the 2025 RLCS World Championship, becoming the first North American team to do so in the 2020s.

=== Valorant ===
On October 8, 2020, NRG entered the Valorant scene, officially signing Damian "Daps" Steele, Sam "s0m" Oh, and coach Chet Singh. NRG never found huge success within the Valorant scene, although consistently remaining as one of the top teams in North America. After being accepted into Riot Games' partnered leagues for 2023, NRG let go of their entire roster, deciding to build with only Sam "s0m" Oh from the old roster. Following the announcement, NRG signed the OpTic Gaming core of in-game leader Pujan "FNS" Mehta, Austin "crashies" Roberts, Victor "Victor" Wong, and Chet again as head coach, with the addition of Ardis "ardiis" Svarenieks, who previously had a highly successful 2022 run with FunPlus Phoenix. They later signed Zander "thwifo" Kim as sixth man in December 2022, but parted ways in March 2023. Later that month, NRG signed one of their content creators, Alan “ethos” Ruan, as their new sixth man. NRG placed second in the Americas League and would qualify to 2023 Masters Tokyo, in which they placed fourth, and 2023 Valorant Champions, in which the team could not qualify to playoffs and were eliminated early.

On September 14, 2023, s0m announced his departure after his nearly three-year stint with NRG, opting to pursue streaming in the meantime. On September 19, 2023, FNS announced his departure, believing he was no longer a "correct fit" for the roster and likewise pursuing streaming. On October 11, 2023, ardiis was signed to Natus Vincere, reuniting with his teammates from 2022. On December 23, 2023, NRG announced the signing of 2023 Valorant Champions winners Max “Demon1” Mazanov and Ethan “Ethan” Arnold, as well as Jimmy "Marved" Nguyen who also competed under the OpTic Gaming core. Following underwhelming results, Demon1 was moved to the bench and Marved was released from the roster. On May 30, 2024, NRG announced the re-signing of FNS and s0m for the remainder of VCT Americas Stage 2. NRG did not qualify for playoffs, ending their season.

On July 16, 2024, NRG released Victor and Chet, and Demon1 was brought back into the starting roster. On September 3, 2024, NRG announced crashies' unrestricted free agency. On October 10, 2024, NRG officially announced Andrew "Verno" Maust from Oxygen Esports, Adam "mada" Pampuch from Moist x Shopify, and coach Malkolm "Bonkar" Rench from Oxygen Esports to the roster, who will compete alongside the core of FNS, s0m, and Ethan.

On February 16th, 2025, NRG announced that they would be moving coach Bonkar and player Verno to the reserve roster for the remainder of the 2025 season. The same day, they announced the arrival of Brock "brawk" Somerhalder and coach Michael "MikesHD" Hockom to the active roster in place of Verno and Bonkar, to compete alongside the rest of the active core. On March 19, 2025, NRG announced the departure of Verno from the organization.

In October 2025, NRG won Champions 2025. NRG was nominated for "Best Esports Team" at The Game Awards 2025, but did not win; brawk was also unsuccessfully nominated as "Best Esports Athlete".

=== Counter-Strike 2 ===
On November 27, 2023, NRG announced a return to competitive Counter-Strike with the announcement of a new North American roster, featuring former Team Liquid players Damian "daps" Steele and Josh "oSee" Ohm, former Complexity player Justin "FaNg" Coakley and former Evil Geniuses players Jadan "HexT" Postma and Vincent "Brehze" Cayonte.

=== League of Legends ===
NRG took over the League Championship Series (LCS) slot and roster owned by Counter Logic Gaming in April 2023. The team won the 2023 LCS Summer season after defeating Cloud9 in the finals by a score of 3–1. At the 2023 World Championship, NRG qualified for the knockout stage after defeating the top seeded European team, G2 Esports, 2–0. They then faced Weibo Gaming in the quarterfinals and were defeated 3–0, knocking them out of the tournament.

NRG left the LCS at the conclusion of the 2024 season alongside the Immortals, ahead of a restructure that saw the LCS merged with Brazil's CBLOL into a new League of the Americas for the 2025 season.

Upon the acquisition of NRG by DarkZero Esports in December 2025, it was announced that DarkZero's League of Legends division, which played in the tier-two North American Challengers League (NACL), would compete as NRG from 2026 onwards, as would all of DarkZero's existing divisions other than Rainbow Six Siege.

== Former divisions ==
=== Counter-Strike: Global Offensive ===
On January 23, 2016, NRG entered CS:GO with signing the ex-Method roster. 11 months later on December 19, NRG completely changed their roster. On July 27, 2017, Peter "ptr" Gurney, who was the only player remaining from the original roster, left the team, replaced by Bulgarian Cvetelin "CeRq" Dimitrov a month later. In March 2018, NRG won the iBUYPOWER Invitational Spring 2018, beating Team Liquid. NRG's second victory came 5 months later in August 2018, after winning IEM Shangai 2018. NRG defeated OpTic Gaming to win cs_summit 3 in November 2018. On February 28, 2019, NRG signed former Cloud9 and MiBR member Tarık "tarik" Çelik to replace Jacob "FugLy" Medina.

On September 26, 2019, the NRG roster was acquired by Evil Geniuses, ending the 4 year CS:GO campaign of the organization.

=== Dragon Ball FighterZ ===
NRG entered the Dragon Ball FighterZ scene in 2018 with the signing of Eduardo "HookGangGod" Deno. His first win under the NRG banner was at Summit of Power 2018 where he took down SonicFox to take the title. Eduardo was also featured in his very own docuseries on Sony Crackle called "Hook'D". The 4-part series featured a cameo appearance from Shaquille O'Neal and debuted on July 27, 2018. NRG released HookGangGod on January 13, 2020.

=== Smite ===
On September 1, 2016, NRG acquired defending Smite World Champions team Panthera. The team joined the organization following a hugely successful first 12 months; qualifying for Worlds as European runners up before dropping just 2 games on their way to the title. They followed this up by going 24–4 in the Spring split to qualify for the Dreamhack Masters in June, dominating the tournament and going undefeated 8–0 to be crowned Champions. The team has most recently won the 2016-2017 Smite World Champions. On December 13, 2018, NRG officially ended their Smite division.

=== Super Smash Bros. ===
NRG signed New Jersey native Nairoby "Nairo" Quezada for their Super Smash Bros. division in August 2016. On July 2, 2020, NRG cut ties with Nairo after allegations that he had been engaged in a sexual relationship with a minor in April 2017, effectively ending the team's Super Smash Bros. division.

== Rosters ==
NRG Esports rosters

Apex Legends
Handle	Name	Nationality
Nocturnal	Singer, Brandon	United States
FunFPS	Groombridge, Brandon	United States
Gild	Dennis, Zachary	United States

League of Legends
Handle	Name	Nationality
Dhokla	Doshi, Niship	United States
Contractz	Garcia, Juan	United States
Palafox	Palafox, Cristian	United States
FBI	Huang, Ian Victor	Australia
Huhi	Choi, Jae-Hyun	South Korea

Rocket League
Handle	Name	Nationality
BeastMode	Konerman, Landon	United States
Atomic	Franceschi, Massimo	United States
Daniel	Piecenski, Daniel	United States

Valorant
Handle	Name	Nationality
mada	Pampuch, Adam	Canada
Ethan	Arnold, Ethan	United States
skuba	Jenkins, Logan	United States
keiko	Sanassy, Georgio	United Kingdom
brawk	Somerhalder, Brock	United States

Counter-Strike 2
Handle	Name	Nationality
oSee	Ohm, Josh	United States
nitr0	Cannella, Nicholas	United States
Sonic	Groesbeek, Aran	South Africa
Grim	Wince, Michael	United States
br0 (I)	Bro, Alexander	Denmark

Legend:
- (I) Inactive
- (S) Suspended
- (L) On loan
- (2W) Two-way player
- Substitute
- (injured) Injury / Illness

== Table of championships ==
Date	Game	Event	Ref.
November 12, 2016	Rocket League	RLCS Season 2 NA Regionals	
January 8, 2017	Smite	Smite World Championship	
May 6, 2017	Rocket League	RLCS Season 3 NA Regionals	
July 16, 2017	Rocket League	FACEIT X Games	
June 10, 2018	Dragon Ball FighterZ	Summit of Power	
July 29, 2018	Smite	SMITE Summer Split 2018	
August 6, 2018	Counter-Strike: Global Offensive	IEM Shanghai 2018	
October 13, 2018	Rocket League	RLCS Season 6 NA Regionals	
November 4, 2018	Counter-Strike: Global Offensive	cs_summit 3	
May 11, 2019	Rocket League	RLCS Season 7 NA Regionals	
August 18, 2019	Rocket League	Rocket League Summit 1	
September 9, 2019	Super Smash Bros. Ultimate	Mainstage 2019	
September 29, 2019	Overwatch	2019 Overwatch League Grand Finals	
December 15, 2019	Rocket League	RLCS Season 8	
October 10, 2020	Overwatch	2020 Overwatch League Grand Finals	
February 28, 2021	Rocket League	RLCSX NA Winter Major	
September 14, 2025	Rocket League	2025 RLCS World Championship	
October 5, 2025	Valorant	2025 Valorant Champions	

== Awards and nominations ==
Year	Ceremony	Category	Result	Ref.
2021	The Streamer Awards	Best Content Organization	Nominated	
2025	The Game Awards	Best Esports Team	Nominated	
