= Overwatch Champions Series =

Professional esports league

- Game: Overwatch
- Founded: 2024
- Owner: Blizzard Entertainment
- Administrator: ESL FaceIt Group (NA and EMEA); WDG (Asia); Thunder Fire Group (China)
- Region: North America; EMEA; Asia; China
- Website: esports.overwatch.com

The Overwatch Champions Series (OWCS) is a global competitive esports tournament series for the video game Overwatch, owned by Blizzard Entertainment. The circuit is divided into four regions: North America, EMEA, Asia and China. The North America and EMEA regions are operated by ESL FaceIt Group, while Asia is operated by Korean esports tournament organizer WDG and China is operated by Thunder Fire Group.

== History ==
Overwatch initially showed promise for an esports scene during its beta phase in 2015, attracting teams from around the world to compete upon its full release. While an open ecosystem for its esport was quickly established, its publisher Activision Blizzard elected to create the Overwatch League, a franchised league akin to North America's NBA, with slots being sold for a reported US$20 million for its inaugural season in 2018. The league faced challenges early on, including a slow start in its inaugural years and logistical issues exacerbated by the COVID-19 pandemic in 2020. Additionally, the announcement of Overwatch 2 in 2019 brought about changes to the format and gameplay, which received a mediocre response upon release in 2022. These challenges, coupled with controversies such as the sexual harassment lawsuit in 2021, led to mounting pressure from teams to exit the league. Months before Microsoft's acquisition of Activision Blizzard, teams were offered the chance to leave the Overwatch League, ultimately leading to its closure in January 2024.

The Overwatch Champions series (OWCS) was established in January 2024 following the folding of Overwatch League. Unlike the previous approach of independently managing the league, Blizzard Entertainment opted for partnerships to oversee specific regions, with ESL FaceIt Group operating the North America and EMEA regions, while WDG was selected to operate the Asia region. The Overwatch Champions Series adopted an open format, departing from the franchise structure of the Overwatch League. This transition opened up opportunities for both established organizations and new entrants, with teams like ENCE and Team Falcons joining the series alongside experienced teams such as Fnatic and TSM. Former Overwatch League teams such as the Toronto Defiant and San Francisco Shock (participating under the name NRG Shock) also remained active after the closure of the Overwatch League, competing with a new roster in the OWCS. Early concerns for OWCS included the lack of well-defined prize pools, not having a clear roadmap, and challenges in maintaining consistent viewership, compared to that of the Overwatch League.

Following its inaugural season, the OWCS elected to shift to a promotion and relegation system. Additionally, it introduced a partnership program, in which nine teams over its original three regions would receive a portion of the proceeds that are generated from crowdfunded in-game team packs.

== 2024 season ==
=== Format ===
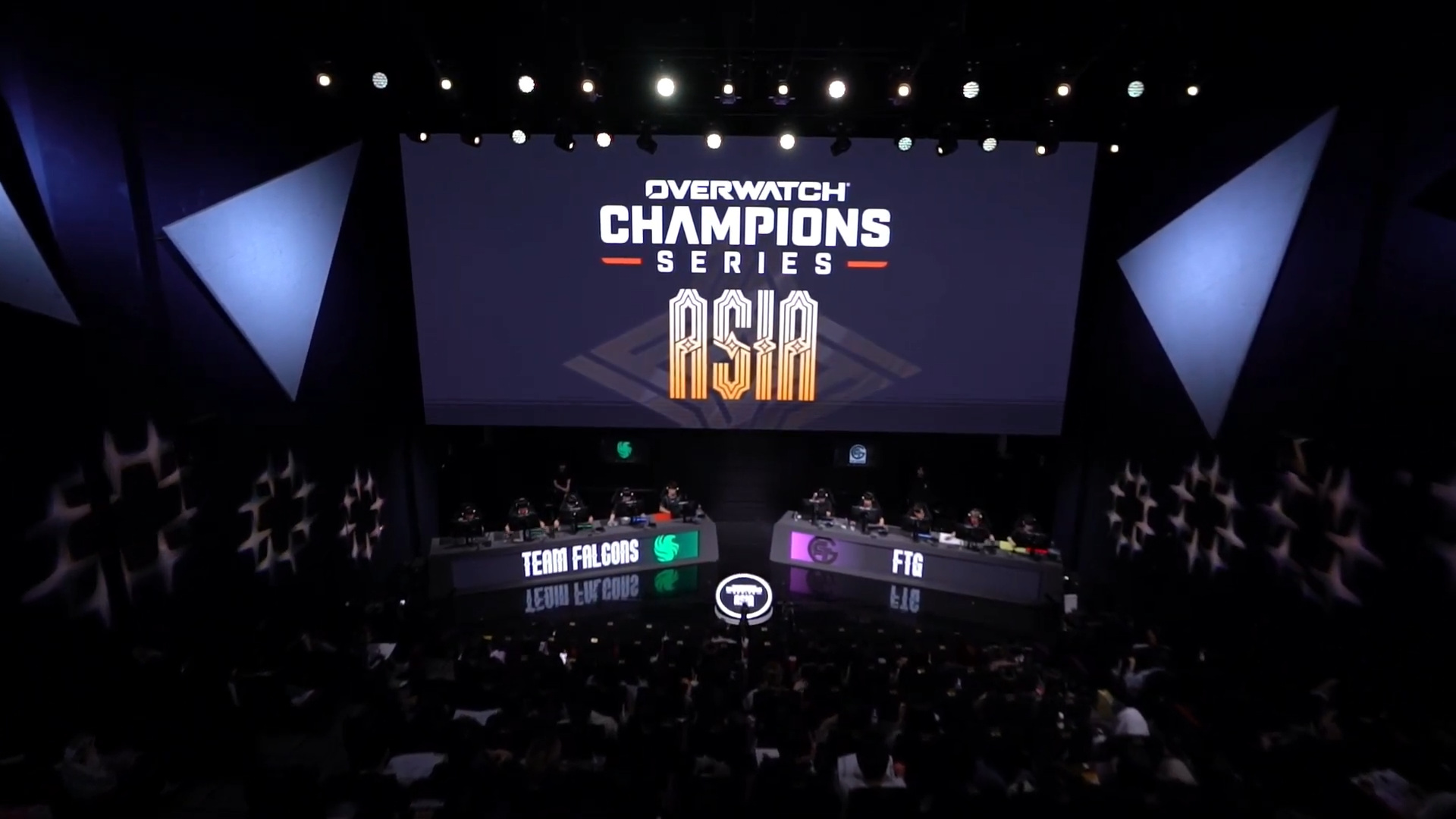
A match in the WDG Esports Studio for the Asia region

The OWCS follows an open tournament format, allowing any team to compete in open qualifiers that lead into regional and international tournaments. The 2024 OWCS was divided into three regions: North America (NA), Europe, the Middle East, and North Africa (EMEA), and Asia. Both North America and EMEA followed the same format structure, with Asia following a different structure due to its size. The 2024 season had two international events: the Dallas Major, which took place from May 31 to June 2 at the Kay Bailey Hutchison Convention Center in Texas, and the Stockholm Finals, which took place from November 22 to 24 at DreamHack Stockholm.

The Asia region had two competitive stages and was further divided into three subregions: South Korea, Japan, and Pacific. Stage 1 began with each subregion hosting its respective Open Qualifiers, which then fed into Regional Tournaments. From there, the top teams from each region advanced to the OWCS Asia Championship, an eight-team event held at the WDG Esports Studio. Qualification from this championship secured slots in the Dallas Major at DreamHack. Stage 2 mirrored Stage 1's format, with top performers advancing to the Stockholm Finals.

For North America and EMEA, the OWCS consisted of four stages. Each stage comprised three phases: Swiss, Groups, and the Main Event. The Swiss phase accommodated up to 512 teams, with the top 16 proceeding to the Group stage. From there, teams competed in groups of four, with the top two from each group advancing to the Main Event – an eight-team, double-elimination tournament. Circuit points were awarded to top finishers in the Main Event, determining qualification for international tournaments. Stages 1 and 2 led into the Dallas Major, while Stages 3 and 4 led into the Stockholm Finals.

=== Broadcast ===
For the 2024 season, OWCS matches were broadcast across various platforms. In North America and Europe, matches were broadcast on YouTube and Twitch. In Asia, the broadcast was available on platforms such as YouTube, CHZZK, AfreecaTV (Korean), and Twitch (WDG and PlayOverwatchJP for Japanese audiences). Viewers could earn exclusive in-game rewards, such as OWCS-themed cosmetics, through Twitch Drops during official match streams.

== 2025 season ==
=== Format ===
The 2025 Overwatch Champions Series was divided into four subregions: North America, EMEA, Asia stayed as regions, while China was added as a competitive region in January 2025. This accompanied the return of the game to the country for the first time since Blizzard and NetEase initially ended their partnership in 2023. North America and EMEA had their leagues reduced in size to 8 teams, while Asia remained relatively the same, with changes only coming to league structure in Japan and Pacific and the elimination of the Wild Card round. The season's split structure also changed, this time to three splits for all regions.

This season introduced promotion and relegation to the OWCS. The bottom two teams in North America, EMEA and Pacific, as well as the bottom three in Korea and bottom four in Japan, had to reclaim their spot for the next split against the best teams in the FACEIT Master Series (the top of FACEIT's competitive Overwatch structure) or equivalent qualifiers.

The top two teams in every region advanced to each split's international tournament. Champions Clash was held after the first split in Hangzhou, China, the Midseason Championship was held after the second split in Riyadh, Saudi Arabia as part of the 2025 Esports World Cup, and the OWCS Finals were held at DreamHack Stockholm.

== Partnered teams ==
Beginning in the 2025 season, the Overwatch Champions Series adopted a partnership program. Nine teams were initially announced to make up this program, four from Asia, three from EMEA and two from North America. Each team would receive a portion of all revenue generated from their team's packs, similar to team bundles in the Valorant Champions Tour and Counter-Strike Major stickers. The partnered teams were announced on January 17, 2025, with the EMEA and North American partnered teams automatically entering the regular season of the first split and the Asian partnered teams automatically entering their regional tournament for that same split. The partnership program would be renewed in 2026 to feature four teams each from Asia and North America, three teams from EMEA, and three permanent teams and one temporary team from China.

OWCS partnered teams
Team	Region (subregion)	Years
All Gamers	China	2026–present
Crazy Raccoon	Asia (Korea)	2025–present
Dallas Fuel	North America	2026–present
Disguised	North America	2026–present
Gen.G	EMEA	2025
JD Gaming	China	2026–present
Milk Tea	China	2026 (temporary)
Spacestation Gaming	North America	2025–present
T1	Asia (Korea)	2025–present
Team Falcons	Asia (Korea)	2025–present
Team Liquid	North America	2025–present
Team Peps	EMEA	2026–present
Twisted Minds	EMEA	2025–present
Virtus.pro	EMEA	2025–present
Weibo Gaming	China	2026–present
ZETA DIVISION	Asia (Korea)	2025–present

== World Finals' results ==
Season	Location	Winner	Score	Runner-up	Third-place	Fourth-place
2024	(Sweden) Stockholm	Team Falcons	4-1	Crazy Raccoon	Toronto Defiant	NRG Shock
2025	(Sweden) Stockholm	Twisted Minds	4-1	Al Qadsiah	Crazy Raccoon	Team Falcons
2026	(China) Guangzhou					
