= Rennsport =

- Cover art featuring a Porsche 911 GT3 R (992)
- Developers: Competition Company; Teyon
- Publishers: Competition Company; Nacon (consoles)
- Engine: Unreal Engine 5
- Platforms: PlayStation 5; Windows; Xbox Series X/S
- Release: 13 November 2025
- Genre: Racing simulation
- Modes: Single-player, multiplayer

Rennsport (stylized in all caps) is a 2025 sim racing video game jointly developed by Munich-based studio Competition Company and Polish video games developer Teyon. The game was made available through closed beta and could be accessed via the Epic Games Store through waitlist invitation on 6 June 2023. The game moved into open beta in July 2024, and into early access in December 2024. On 7 March 2025, the game was confirmed to be released on PlayStation 5 and Xbox Series X/S with Nacon publishing the console versions. The game left early access for a full release on 13 November 2025.

== Gameplay ==
Rennsport is a simulation, combined with custom Unreal Engine 5 graphics. Esports is a major focus in Rennsport; the game is closely tied to and was formally unveiled alongside the ESL R1 tournament. The game was originally released on early access with a free-to-play business model, also featuring a battle pass. This was later discontinued ahead of its launch in favor of a traditional buy-to-play model.

== Development ==
Details on Rennsport were revealed on 8 April 2022 by Competition Company. According to the developers, the team behind the game consisted of "professional drivers, racing strategists, programmers, and esports experts." It would be developed using Unreal Engine 5 as its graphics engine, modding would be a feature, and players would be able to trade digital assets, with personal cars containing their own vehicle identification number. Competition Company CEO Morris Hebecker clarified that the game's digital assets would not be non-fungible tokens. A partnership with ESL was also announced.

=== Physics engine allegations ===
Competition Company and Teyon faced allegations during Rennsport's closed beta stage regarding the game's internal physics code, which was found to be identical to the isiMotor 2.5 engine used in rFactor 2. Both teams wrote a blog post in response, stating that they had acquired a license to the isiMotor engine directly from Image Space Incorporated, using it as a foundation to create a physics build for the game. Competition Company CEO Morris Hebecker affirmed that all internal code was "created by us, commissioned, or licensed appropriately". Studio 397 and Motorsport Games, developer and publisher of rFactor 2 respectively, released a joint statement denying any involvement with Competition Company or Teyon, stating that they had not issued a license to them, or to any other developer.

== Rennsport R1 ==
In 2022, Competition Company and Teyon announced a partnership with ESL, with the developers confirming that the game would be developed with esports in mind. Full details were revealed of the partnership's joint project in January 2023, with a new esports tournament called ESL R1, based around online series and in-person LAN Major events functioning in similar fashion to the Counter-Strike Major Championships which ESL have previously hosted. A number of high-profile teams would participate in the tournament, with a total prize pool of €225,000. ESL dropped their sanctioning of the series in 2025, with the tournament now running as Rennsport R1.

At the foundation of the tournament, Rennsport was at an open beta stage, which meant R1 was used as a test bed for the game's development, gathering direct feedback from players participating in the tournament.

== Reception ==
Reception

Aggregate scores
Aggregator	Score
Metacritic	(PS5) 53/100 (XSX) 58/100
OpenCritic	19% recommend

Rennsport received "mixed" reviews from critics according to review aggregator website Metacritic, and weak approval from fellow aggregator OpenCritic with 19% of critics recommending the game. Many critics concluded that Rennsport felt unfinished, with some likening the gameplay to a beta release or an early access game, though others agreed that the game featured a solid foundation to build from.
