= Twisted Minds =

Saudi Arabian esports organization

- Esports: Call of Duty: Warzone; EA Sports FC; Overwatch; PUBG; Rocket League; Valorant
- Founded: 2021
- Location: Saudi Arabia
- Owners: Ibrahim Bin Jibreen; Hatem Almukhailed
- Main sponsor: Riyadh Season

Twisted Minds (Arabic: تويستد مايندز) is a Saudi Arabian esports organization. Founded in 2021, the club fields rosters in multiple esports titles, including PUBG, Warzone, Honor of Kings, Overwatch, and EA Sports FC. In 2025, the organization won three titles: the PUBG and Warzone tournaments at the Esports World Cup, and the Overwatch Champions Series World Finals.

== History ==
Twisted Minds was founded in 2021 when a group of players entered a local PUBG Mobile tournament. After deciding on the team name, the organization began to compete regularly in regional events. In 2022, Twisted Minds expanded into additional titles including Valorant, Overwatch and Rocket League. The year 2023 marked further growth, with the organization fielding a larger roster and recording increased participation in tournaments. In 2024, Twisted Minds competed with multiple active rosters across a range of titles and won two world championships. By 2025, the organization expanded operations into Southeast Asia and increased its presence in China and the Philippines.

== Divisions ==
=== Esports World Cup 2025 ===
At the Esports World Cup 2025, Twisted Minds won the PUBG: Battlegrounds championship, and later claimed the Call of Duty: Warzone title. These victories were noted as part of Saudi Arabia’s third title at the event.

=== ESL Saudi Challenge ===
In December 2024, Twisted Minds won the inaugural ESL Saudi Challenge, defeating Vision Esports in the grand final and securing the championship title.

In June 2025, the team also won the ESL Saudi Challenge for a second consecutive year, defeating Al Qadsiah in the final.

=== Other competitions ===
Twisted Minds qualified for the Honor of Kings World Cup in 2025. The team has also competed in EA Sports FC tournaments, including the FC Pro Open.

== Rosters ==
Twisted Minds rosters

Overwatch
Handle	Name	Nationality
Quartz	Alali, Ibrahem	Saudi Arabia
Youbi	Alyoubi, Ahmad	Saudi Arabia
FunnyAstro	Hathaway, Daniel	United Kingdom
JaeWoo	Kim Jae-woo	South Korea
TVNT	Altmimi, Abdulaziz	Saudi Arabia
KSAA	Alruwaili, Alhumaidi	Saudi Arabia
Simple	Kim Ji-sung	South Korea

Rocket League
Handle	Name	Nationality
Nwpo	Alqadi, Hisham	Saudi Arabia
TRK511	Alotaibi, Mohammed	Saudi Arabia
M0nkey M00n	Rogez, Evan	France
Hisoka	Ali, Osama	Saudi Arabia

PUBG Mobile
Handle	Name	Nationality
FREAK	Ibrahim Dawid, Reshar	Iraq
LORD	Ahmed Jawad, Muslim	Iraq
Esport	—, —	Iraq
J3	Almamoori, Jaafar	Iraq
KEVIN	Walid, Muhammad	Iraq
Wa7sh	Bassam, Abdullah	Iraq

Mobile Legends: Bang Bang
Handle	Name	Nationality
7oda	Abdelrahman Youssef, Mahmoud Ayman Saleh	Egypt
Smile	Moustafa, Ahmed Mohsen Ahmed Fawzy	Egypt
Markyyyyy	Capacio, Mark Christian Etcobanez	Philippines
KENJI	Mohamed, Amir Tarek Abdelwagged Mahmoud	Egypt
Super	Ibraheem Alzaglul, Ahmad Sameer	Jordan

Honor of Kings
Handle	Name	Nationality
Nighty	Hu Giorgio	Taiwan
Clean	Wu Botong	China
Xue	Yao Weixiang	China
hailang	Raza, Martin	Germany
Shanks	Song Giovanni	China
Ctboy	Qi Changpeng	China

PUBG: Battlegrounds
Handle	Name	Nationality
BatulinS	Batulin, Aleksandr	Russia
Lu	Lukyanov, Kirill	Russia
Perfect1ks	Dubenyuk, Dmytrii	Ukraine
xmpl	Adarkin, Artem	Russia

League of Legends
Handle	Name	Nationality
Wufo	Alkhowaiteer, Nawaf	Saudi Arabia
Sloth	Bae Jeong-sub	South Korea
OniiKhan	Mubarak, Abdulaziz Al	Saudi Arabia

VALORANT
Handle	Name	Nationality
ExiT	Al-Twairji, Abdullah	Saudi Arabia
Zimo	Al Amri, Abdullah	Saudi Arabia
sand	Emad, Mark	Egypt
sickrey	Novozhilov, Nikolay	Russia
waleed	Sakka, Waleed	Saudi Arabia
Jesse	Čvrtniček, Adam	Czech Republic

Apex Legends
Handle	Name	Nationality
Albralelie	Beckwith, Mac Kenzie	United States
Crook	Hughes, Kyle	United States
Enemy	Rodriguez, Alexander	United States

Rainbow Six Siege
Handle	Name	Nationality
Dov2hkiin	Alsaeedi, Abdullah	Saudi Arabia
Guardz	Alsaeedi, Abdulrahman	Saudi Arabia
Hashom	Al Jafri, Hashem	Saudi Arabia
Jlad	Jallad, Fayez	Saudi Arabia
P9	Albattain, Fahad	Saudi Arabia
X.Ke	Al Wahabi, Abdellah	Saudi Arabia

Fighting games
Handle	Name	Nationality
Slash	Qazili, Molham	Syria
Arslan Ash	Siddique, Arslan	Pakistan
Hafiz Tanveer	Tanveer, Hafiz	Pakistan
Latif	Ahmili, Abdullatif	Saudi Arabia
vWsym	—, —	Saudi Arabia
NoahTheProdigy	Solis, Noah	United States
Supernoon	Carbajal, Steve	United States

Fortnite
Handle	Name	Nationality
Acorn	Akhras, Abdullah	Canada
Boltz	Feyzjou, Alexander	United States
Rapid	—, —	Canada
Cold	Butler, Joshua	United States

Legend:
- (I) Inactive
- (S) Suspended
- (L) On loan
- (2W) Two-way player
- Substitute
- (injured) Injury / Illness

=== Twisted Minds Orchid ===
Twisted Minds Orchid is a female-only roster for Overwatch and Valorant.

Twisted Minds Orchid rosters

Valorant
Handle	Name	Nationality
lexa	Persson, Alexandra	Sweden
yelz	Allazzam, Yara	Saudi Arabia
mediKa	Lambertz, Annika	Germany
tokameite	Pozharskaya, Anastasia	Russia
Leen	Alanazi, Leen	Saudi Arabia
htm	Kozhemyakina, Lada	Kazakhstan
Sucette	Özden, Sara	Switzerland

Overwatch
Handle	Name	Nationality
chipmunk	Iveson, Jamie	United Kingdom
Miraei	—, Amira	Yemen
Nan	Nan, Yang	China
Suznn	—, Suzanne	Egypt
Kasumii	van der Meet, Liz	Netherlands
Plant	Plant, Alice	United Kingdom

Legend:
- (I) Inactive
- (S) Suspended
- (L) On loan
- (2W) Two-way player
- Substitute
- (injured) Injury / Illness

== Awards and nominations ==
Year	Ceremony	Category	Result	Ref.
2023	Gamers8 Club Awards	Best Team In The World	Won	
