= ALGS Year 4 =

- League: ALGS
- Sport: Apex Legends

Split 1 Playoffs
- Champions: Reject Winnity

Split 2 Playoffs
- Champions: Spacestation Gaming

2025 Championship
- Champions: GoNext Esports

ALGS seasons
- ← 2022–23 2025–26 →

The 2023–24 Apex Legends Global Series (ALGS) season or ALGS Year 4 was the fourth season of ALGS play. The series is organized by the game's publisher and developer, Electronic Arts (EA) and Respawn Entertainment, respectively.

The season ran from preseason qualifiers in October 2023 through the ALGS Championship in February 2025. The ALGS series encompassed six regions: North America (NA), South America (SA), Asia–Pacific North (APAC North), Asia–Pacific South (APAC South), China, and Europe, the Middle East, and Africa (EMEA). A "BLGS" tournament was held during the ALGS hiatus, which occurred between the September 2024 end of the Split 2 LAN tournament through the ALGS Championship.

== Game background and meta ==
The ALGS features players competing in the Battle Royale mode of Apex Legends. "Storm Point" and "World's Edge" were the two maps utilized in the previous season of ALGS play. Teams also play unofficial matches against each other called scrimmages, or "scrims". During the offseason between ALGS Year 3 and 4, EA considered introducing "Olympus" as an ALGS map. Olympus was used for offseason scrims due to an issue with Storm Point. EA also asked pro players to test Olympus in scrim matches. Apex maps feature several points of interest (POI), which teams select to land at prior to games. As such, other teams know the landing locations (called "drop spots") of their opponents; this convention is in place so that teams can practice their rotations and looting routes. Teams that land nearby each other often contest each other early in a match. As a match goes on, the map closes in on a fixed point, or "final circle", with this game element being referred to as the "ring closing".

Rosters are made up of three players each selecting a character in the game, called "Legends". Patches to the game in the forms of buffs and nerfs to characters cause changes in their selection rates, thus impacting team compositions and the game's meta. ALGS games are played a patch or two off of the game's most recent patch update. Though teams usually play in-line with the current meta of the game, some teams opt to play "off meta" and incorporate unorthodox playstyles.

Changes to the game's meta also occur when new seasons of Apex Legends are released by EA. ALGS gameplay during Year 3 influenced game development for Season 19 of Apex Legends; the popularity of the 30-30 weapon caused its hipfire to be nerfed. Respawn's game designer for balance, John Larson, also announced changes to the Bangalore and Catalyst characters, due to their high usage in the "can't-see-shit meta".

== Schedule and format ==
On September 10, 2023, the official @PlayApexEsports Twitter account confirmed ALGS would be returning for a fourth season beginning in the fall. That day, Chris Pipher, the director of league operations for the ALGS, also stated details on "Year 4" would be released "in the next few weeks". EA and Respawn formally announced the ALGS Year 4 circuit on October 5.

The prize pool for Year 4 remained at USD$5 million it was set at for Year 3. Preseason qualifiers (PSQ), regional Pro Leagues, and the Challenger Circuit (CC) also returned. Following PSQs, the season was split into two halves. The series retained the three in-person LAN schedule (one per split and an end-of-season ALGS Championship tournament), as well. Key differences in ALGS Year 4 included the addition of the People's Republic of China as its own region, and the removal of a Pro League system for the South American region. The regional Pro Leagues featured 30 teams in each region, with 22 being invited automatically and eight others clinching spots through PSQs.

The Split 1 LAN tournament involved 40 teams, 36 of which qualified through the Pro League regular season; twelve of the LAN event berths were awarded to North American teams, with eight each coming from EMEA, APAC North, and the APAC South regions. Instead of a Pro League system determining qualification spots for the LAN events, the China and South America regions each had at least two guaranteed berths; China had its teams invited by the ALGS itself, while South American teams qualified through a series of CC tournaments ahead of a match point regional final. Prize pools for the regional Pro Leagues were set at USD$125,000. Each regional Pro League had its own playoff tournament, with some spots in the playoffs coming from official ALGS invitations.

Additionally, each team's final split placement earned them circuit points; the 30 teams with the highest cumulative score qualified for the ALGS Championship after the conclusion of Split 2. An additional final ten spots in the Championship tournament were decided by the Last Chance Qualifiers (LCQ), which occurred following the second split.

== Roster and organizational changes ==
=== Off-season ===
Heading into ALGS Year 4, Moist Esports relocated from the APAC South region to the NA region.

During the off-season, many organizations changed their rosters to varying degrees, a period which many in the ALGS scene refer to as "rostermania". The following organizations dropped their rosters, announcing they would be leaving the ALGS scene completely: Ascend, Complexity, Entropiq, Horizon Union, KCP, and NRG. 100 Thieves, NORTHEPTION, and Team Singularity also dropped their entire rosters. Team Liquid, Cloud9, Spacestation Gaming (SSG), and G2 were also among teams that left the ALGS scene.

Fnatic overhauled their roster, releasing two players. Other organizations to drop and replace players included Element 6 (E6) and Team PULVERX (PVX), meanwhile Team UpperMoon and Already There formed as orgless teams made up of players looking to be signed by organizations.

=== Partnership Program ===
Following many organizations leaving the ALGS scene, citing a lack of support from EA, the publisher announced an ALGS Partnership Program on November 30, 2023. The program provided a financial stipend, in addition to media and content support for 12 organizations.

The 12 teams announced as part of the program were:

- Alliance
- DarkZero
- Disguised
- FaZe
- Fnatic
- FURIA
- LG Chivas
- Moist Esports
- OpTiC Gaming
- Riddle
- TSM
- XSET

=== In-season ===
During the preseason qualifiers, Furia dropped its roster and signed new players, including HisWattson who unretired to join the roster.

Teams with an ALGS slot had until a January 16, 2024 cutoff date to finalize changes to their roster. Just ahead of the Split 1 Pro League period, Disguised (DSG) announced the signing of "iiTzTimmy", "Enemy", "Dezignful", and coach "Bronzey"; the group previously competed as an orgless squad under the name "The Dojo".

== Preseason qualifiers ==
Preseason qualifier (PSQ) events ran from November 25 through December 18, 2023. The PSQs were played to "determine the last eight teams for each region's Pro League". The first preseason qualifier (PSQ) event ran from November 25 to 27, 2023. Over 300 teams entered the PSQ, with the first event seeing Elev8 Gaming (E8), No Days Off, Playoutside, and MDY Black qualify for the NA, EMEA, APAC North, and APAC South regional Pro Leagues, respectively. GKS, Oblivion, and Tempr clinched spots in the NA Pro League in the following three PSQ events. Team Passion, Players, and LVH qualified for the EMEA Pro League through latter three PSQ events. APAC North saw Yokoyari, Team Mellst, and O2 Esports qualify for the regional Pro League; meanwhile, teams that qualified for the APAC South Pro League through PSQ events also included MnK, Akuma, and MDY Red.

Oversleepers finished in fifth place in the NA PSQ tournaments, but due to "sweetdreams" announcing his intentions to join "Fuhhnq" and "Slayr" of Stallions, using the ex-NRG Pro League spot in the process, Oversleepers was awarded the final spot in the NA Pro League. The Stallions duo and sweetdreams were signed by Luminosity Gaming.

Three Dragons originally qualified for the EMEA region's Pro League, but one of their players ("Sunzyyy") was banned prior to the last PSQ; the team originally earned enough placement points despite playing as a duo, but all of Sunzyyy's points were revoked, dropping the team out of qualification. The team 40%Worse was elevated through to the Pro League.

Although Mellst originally qualified for the APAC North Pro League, "Kanehira" announced his withdrawal from team, making them ineligible for qualification. Team Wasshoi was sent through in Mellst's place, with the organization Realize signing the Wasshoi roster.

== Split 1 ==
During Split 1, the game's meta mainly centered around Bangalore, Bloodhound, and Caustic. Bangalore, Catalyst, Conduit, and Horizon proved to be common selections by ALGS players during the 2024 Split 1 Pro League period.

On October 14, 2023, Zac Conely, the ALGS League Ops Manager announced that the "first wave" of automatic invitations to regional Pro League playoffs were made. Among teams to earn automatic invitations to their regional Pro League playoffs were: TSM, Furia, Luminosity Gaming (LG), Moist Esports, The Dojo, DNO, Already There, Team o7, Team GREGGS, and UpperMoon. Other teams invited were officially released to Battlefy, a company involved in organizing esports tournaments. By October 23, these additional teams included DarkZero, XSET, Alliance, Oxygen Esports (OXG), E6, 100 Thieves, Aurora, Fnatic, PVX, Enter Force.36, GoNext, VEXED, Realize, Meat Lovers, Phoenix Legacy, Sentinels, BLVKHVND, DreamFire, and OpTic Gaming. Some of these organizations ultimately did not participate in ALGS Year 4, such as 100 Thieves, which withdrew from the competitive scene despite having a team.

The Split 1 Pro Leagues began play on January 20, 2024, and ran through April 1, with a prize pool of USD$125,000.

On March 18, the North American Pro League finals were interrupted by a hacker known as "Destroyer2009". During the third match of the finals, DarkZero's "Genburten" was given a wallhack, which revealed the location of other players. Genburten also had no control over his aiming and the hacker was able to spam his in-game chat. DarkZero initially continued playing as a duo, finishing in second place for the match and heading into the fourth match with an overall lead. During that fourth match, the hacker granted TSM's "ImperialHal" an aimbot, which automatically locked Hal's aim onto opposing players. Hal asked if he could continue playing, with the caveat that he did not shoot. However, the match was abandoned and the ALGS suspended the regional finals. Regarding Apex play outside of the ALGS, Respawn "quickly got to work adding layers of security to Apex Legends to make it safe and secure for everyone". The ALGS organized a replay of the NA regional finals, holding them the following week in secret; TSM won, scoring 80 points. The matches were recorded and broadcast on March 26, via the PlayApex Twitch channel.

=== Split 1 Playoffs ===
In March, EA announced the Split 1 Playoffs LAN event would be held at the Galen Center in Los Angeles, California, from May 2–5, 2024. 40 teams qualified for the event, which had a $1 million prize pool.

== Split 2 ==
Following the Split 1 Playoffs, EA announced several details regarding Split 2, which began on June 1, 2024. The Pro League phase of Split 2 introduced POI drafts, where eligible teams select their preferred landing spots on applicable maps; these drafts were randomly seeded snake drafts. The total prize pool for Split 2's Pro Leagues was $500,000, equally divided across the four regions in play (North America, EMEA, APAC North, and APAC South).

=== Split 2 Playoffs ===
30 teams qualified for the Split 2 Playoffs depending on their regional Pro League rank; North America had the most bids (12), followed by APAC North (9), EMEA (8), and APAC South (7).

== BLGS ==
Following the Split 2 Playoffs LAN, EA announced the "BLGS", a series of online open tournaments taking place between the Split 2 LAN and the season's ALGS Championship tournament.

== 2025 ALGS Championship ==
The 2025 ALGS Championship was held at the Daiwa Premist Dome in Sapporo, Japan. GoNext won the tournament.

== Broadcasting ==
The broadcast lineup for Split 1 Pro League included Raynday, SpiderTiff, VikkiKitty, Gaskin, Onset, GlitterXplosion, Zephyr, Genome, DiA, and Stella. North American and EMEA Pro League matches were streamed on the official Apex Legends Esports YouTube and Twitch channels.

Rage, a Japanese esports entertainment platform jointly operated by CyberZ, Avex Entertainment, and TV Asahi, was the ALGS's Japanese broadcasting partner for Split 2.
