= ALGS Year 3 =

- League: ALGS
- Sport: Apex Legends
- Duration: October 8, 2022–September 10, 2023 (Note: This includes the dates of: October 8–30, 2022 (Preseason Qualifiers) November 5, 2022–February 5, 2023 (Split 1) February 11–13, 2023 (Split 2 Qualifiers) March 11–July 16, 2023 (Split 2) July 21–23, 2023 (Last Chance Qualifiers for the ALGS Championship) September 6–10, 2023 (ALGS Championship))

Split 1 Playoffs
- Champions: TSM
- Season MVP: ImperialHal

Split 2 Playoffs
- Champions: DarkZero Esports
- Season MVP: Zer0

2023 Championship
- Champions: TSM
- Season MVP: ImperialHal

ALGS seasons
- ← 2021–22 2023–24 →

The 2022–23 Apex Legends Global Series (ALGS) season or ALGS Year 3 was the third season of ALGS play. The series is organized by the game's publisher and developer, Electronic Arts (EA) and Respawn Entertainment, respectively.

The season ran from preseason qualifiers in October 2022 through the 2023 ALGS Championship in September 2023. The tournament encompassed five regions: North America (NA), South America (SA), Asia–Pacific North (APAC North), Asia–Pacific South (APAC South), and Europe, the Middle East, and Africa (EMEA).

== Game background and meta ==
The series features players competing in the Battle Royale mode of Apex Legends. "Storm Point" and "World's Edge" are the two maps utilized in ALGS play. The maps feature several points of interest (POI), which teams select to land at prior to games. As such, other teams know the landing locations (called "drop spots") of their opponents; this convention is in place so that teams can practice their rotations and looting routes. Teams that land nearby each other often contest each other early in a match. As a match goes on, the map closes in on a fixed point, or "final circle", with this game element being referred to as the "ring closing".

Rosters are made up of three players each selecting a character in the game, called "Legends". Patches to the game in the forms of buffs and nerfs to characters cause changes in their selection rates, thus impacting team compositions and the game's meta. ALGS games were noted to be played a patch or two off of the game's most recent patch update. Though teams usually play in-line with the current meta of the game, some teams opt to play "off meta" and incorporate unorthodox playstyles.

Changes to the game's meta also occur when new seasons of Apex Legends are released by EA. ALGS Year 3 saw play during Seasons 14–18 of Apex; the season began toward the end of Season 14 (called "Hunted"). Season 15 ("Eclipse") was introduced on November 1, 2022, at the precipice of Split 1 Pro League play, and ended shortly after the Split 1 Playoffs. Season 16 ("Revelry") ran from February 14–May 9, 2023, which included a portion of the Split 2 Pro League. Season 17 ("Arsenal") was seen during the Split 2 Playoffs, having run from May 9–August 8. Finally, Season 18 ("Resurrection") was introduced on August 8, and was the setting of the 2023 ALGS Championship in September.

Players are often described as filling one of three roles for their teams: in-game leader (IGL), fragger, or anchor, though an IGL can also function as a team's anchor. Examples of Year 3 IGLs included TSM's ImperialHal and DarkZero Esports' Zer0, with the two often considered among the best players in Apex. Fraggers are tasked with providing their teams the most damage output and kills and as such are expected to have excellent aiming skills. Due to this, they often use controllers, benefiting from the aim assist. An example of a fragger during Year 3 was Miron "Effect" Novikov of Alliance. Anchor is considered a more passive role and effective when played on appropriate characters. Alliance's "Vaifs", who stepped away from competing shortly prior to the season's initial Pro League play, is an example of an anchor player.

Players choose their own gaming inputs from one of two options: mouse and keyboard (MnK or M&K) or a controller (sometimes colloquially referred to as "roller"). The latter became the more dominant input in November 2022, toward the beginning of ALGS Year 3. Players have been noted to argue that those who use the opposite input have an advantage, such as controller players having an aim assist. Some patches during the season effectively nerfed how some characters are played on controller.

In competitive Apex, tournaments are categorized by tiers ranging from S-tier to D-tier, with level of competition, competitor skill, and prize pools being factors in the tiers. A USD$5 million prize pool was won over the course of the Year 3 season. The ALGS LAN tournaments are S-tier competitions, while the Last Chance Qualifiers (LCQ) and Challenger Circuits are B-tier and C-tier competitions. Teams also play unofficial matches against each other called scrimmages, or "scrims".

== Schedule and format ==
The ALGS season was divided into two series of events, called "Splits". After Split 2, a Championship concluded the season. Each Split featured regional Pro Leagues competed by 30 teams in each region. For Split 1, the ALGS' organizers invited 22 teams per region to compete in regional Pro Leagues, with the remaining eight slots competed for during the Preseason Qualifiers.

The 2022–23 season began with Preseason Qualifiers in October 2022. Meanwhile, each region's Pro League began in November. Additionally, the winning team from each Challenger Circuit tournament also automatically qualified for the Split 2 Pro League Qualifier or the LCQ for the ALGS Championship.

The season also saw three in-person LAN events: the finals for the Split 1 and Split 2 Playoffs, as well as the ALGS Championship held in September 2023. It was the first season to have these three LAN events, as ALGS Years 1 and 2 were disrupted by the COVID-19 pandemic, causing plans for LAN events to adjust and forcing tournaments to be held online. Each LAN event was played under a match point format. In the format, any team that crossed the match point threshold of 50 points would clinch an overall tournament victory by then winning a game. Any team that won a game after reaching match point would then be named a LAN tournament winner, regardless of total score, though remaining teams would still be ranked by total score. Aside from the cash prize at the Split 1 and 2 Playoff finals, teams also competed for playoff points counting toward qualification for the ALGS Championship. The number of playoff slots were also decided by each region's performance at LAN events. An individual player was also selected as the MVP of each tournament, with the award sponsored by Monster Energy.

A team's score after a match is determined by a combination of their kill points and placement points; teams earn one point for each kill. The standard placement points are 12 points for the first-place team, nine for second, seven for third, five for fourth, four for fifth, three each for sixth and seventh, two each for eighth through tenth, one point each for 11th through 15th, and zero points for the 16th- through 20th-placed teams.

=== Split 2 ===
For the Split 2 Pro League format, 30 teams from each of the five regions are seeded into three groups of ten each, with seeding based on the Split 1 ALGS Playoffs and Split 2 Qualifiers. These teams then compete in a double round-robin format, playing each other group three times in series of six games; the Pro League regular season consisted of 36 total games running from March 11 through May 7.

== Split 1 Pro League ==
Aurora Gaming won the EMEA Regional Pro League and also placed second in the region's Pro League Finals. Fire Beavers won the Finals in seven games.

Over in North America, Sentinels struggled, being relegated from the Pro League meaning they had to compete for their place in the Split 2 Pro League through the Challenger's Circuit. They would drop their entire roster and sign former Spacestation Gaming (SSG) players.

== Split 1 Playoffs ==
The Split 1 Playoffs were held from February 2–5 at the Copper Box Arena in London. 40 teams qualified for the LAN tournament, which had a US$1 million prize pool. The 40 teams were placed into four groups of ten teams each; these groups were snake seeded based on their regional pro league finishes. After the group stage, teams were placed into either a winners' bracket or an elimination bracket. The top ten finishing teams of the winners' bracket clinched spots in the finals. Meanwhile, the top ten finishing teams of the elimination bracket would find their way into another bracket alongside the bottom ten teams of the winners' bracket. These 20 teams would compete for the final ten slots of the finals.

Three teams (Aurora, DEWA United, and Fire Beavers) encountered visa issues and had to miss the tournament; their players were from Belarus, Indonesia, and Russia. They were replaced by Horizon Union, DreamFire, and Passion. Alliance also encountered visa issues, resulting in Effect missing the tournament and the team playing with a substitute player.

EA set up COVID isolation booths for this LAN, allowing affected players to still compete with their teams, though not on the main stage. XSET's in-game leader (IGL) and captain Nocturnal was noted to use an isolation booth. His team had a strong performance during the LAN's opening day. Fnatic also performed well on opening day.

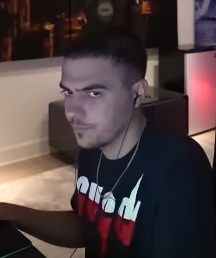
ImperialHal was named the MVP of Split 1 Playoffs LAN

TSM was the top performing team in the group stage, finishing with 153 total points. During the bracket stage of the event, they started slowly but had a late resurgence and ultimately won the Split 1 Finals, winning the grand prize of US$300,000. On the final day of the tournament, they won three of eight rounds, including the decisive final match. Their roster consisted of Phillip "ImperialHal" Dosen, Jordan "Reps" Wolfe, and Evan "Verhulst" Verhulst, as well as "Raven", their coach. ImperialHal served as their IGL and was named the MVP of the tournament. With the victory, TSM became the first org to surpass US$1 million in total competitive Apex winnings. NRG finished in second, with Acend and XSET having also reached match point.

Justin-Ivan Labilles of Dot Esports wrote that in the time between the 2022 ALGS Championship and the 2023 Split 1 Playoffs, "old defensive staples phased out in favor of new aggressive playstyles and compositions that totaled more than half of Apex's playable characters". Valkyrie was the most-selected character during the tournament. She was featured along with Bangalore and Seer in the most popular team composition of the Playoffs (27% pick rate).

Following the Split 1 Playoffs, Shawn "Unit" Pellerin, the CEO of SSG, announced the team would be exiting the Apex scene. Unit expressed that "without a fair [revenue] share partnership", it would be unsustainable for the team to compete.

=== Group stage ===
Groups (Note: Aurora Gaming, Fire Beavers, and DEWA United, originally qualified for the Split 1 Playoffs but encountered visa issues and were replaced by Horizon Union, DreamFire, and Passion.)
Group A	Group B	Group C	Group D
Horizon Union; XSET; Moist Esports; Enter Force.36; Gødfire; LeaveNoWitness; Pulverex; 100 Thieves; JLINGZ Esports; GameWard	TSM; NorthEption; NorCal Esports; DreamFire; Passion; Alliance; Flora; Oxygen; Spacestation; FC destroy	Fnatic; Acend; The Guard; K1CK; ONIC Esports; EXO Clan; NRG; Pioneers gambare otousan GHS Professional	IronBlood; Team Singularity; Vexed; Crazy Raccoon; Esports Arena; Luminosity; Invictus Gaming (Note: Also referred to as iG.International or simply Invictus.) fun123 Element 6 DarkZero

Group Stage results
Rank	Team	Points	Results
1	TSM	153	Advanced to Winner's Bracket
2	Northempton	152	Advanced to Winner's Bracket
3	EXO Clan	147	Advanced to Winner's Bracket
4	NRG	147	Advanced to Winner's Bracket
5	XSET	136	Advanced to Winner's Bracket
6	JLINGZ Esports	133	Advanced to Winner's Bracket
7	Spacestation	131	Advanced to Winner's Bracket
8	Fnatic	129	Advanced to Winner's Bracket
9	Esports Arena	128	Advanced to Winner's Bracket
10	Acend	127	Advanced to Winner's Bracket
11	100 Thieves	123	Advanced to Winner's Bracket
12	The Guard	121	Advanced to Winner's Bracket
13	DarkZero	117	Advanced to Winner's Bracket
14	Moist Esports	116	Advanced to Winner's Bracket
15	Element 6	114	Advanced to Winner's Bracket
16	fun123	113	Advanced to Winner's Bracket
17	Luminosity	109	Advanced to Winner's Bracket
18	Enter Force.36	107	Advanced to Winner's Bracket
19	Alliance	106	Advanced to Winner's Bracket
20	Pulverex	100	Advanced to Winner's Bracket
21	DreamFire	99	Relegated to Loser's Bracket
22	IronBloodGaming	95	Relegated to Loser's Bracket
23	FC destroy	95	Relegated to Loser's Bracket
24	ONIC Esports	95	Relegated to Loser's Bracket
25	Team Singularity	94	Relegated to Loser's Bracket
26	GHS Professional	86	Relegated to Loser's Bracket
27	Crazy Raccoon	86	Relegated to Loser's Bracket
28	Ganbare Otousan	84	Relegated to Loser's Bracket
29	GameWard	82	Relegated to Loser's Bracket
30	iG.International	80	Relegated to Loser's Bracket
31	Pioneers	79	Relegated to Loser's Bracket
32	Vexed Gaming	69	Relegated to Loser's Bracket
33	Flora	67	Relegated to Loser's Bracket
34	Oxygen Esports	59	Relegated to Loser's Bracket
35	Passion	53	Relegated to Loser's Bracket
36	Horizon Union	49	Relegated to Loser's Bracket
37	Gødfire	42	Relegated to Loser's Bracket
38	NorCal Esports	41	Relegated to Loser's Bracket
39	LeaveNoWitness	40	Relegated to Loser's Bracket
40	K1CK	37	Relegated to Loser's Bracket

== Split 2 Pro League ==
The Split 2 Pro League regular season ran from March 11 through May 7. April 29 and 30 marked the end of the NA and EMEA regions' group stages, with regional finals being played on May 7. At the end of the regular season games during the Pro League, each region's top 20 teams by point totals qualified for Regional Final play.

Organizations shuffled their team rosters through the season, such as Complexity overhauling their roster at the mid-way point of the Pro League season. Sentinels also changed their roster, signing Angello "Xenial" Cadenas (previously on Oxygen Esports' roster), after Beau "RamBeau" Shiedy retired. In mid-April, Rick "Sharky" Wirth of DarkZero (DZ) announced his retirement, citing a loss of passion for Apex. Despite having announced his own retirement, RamBeau then joined DarkZero for the remainder of the Pro League regular season. However, he was replaced by Brody "Xynew" Geissler for the NA Pro League's regional finals, forcing Meat Lovers—Xynew's former team—to find a replacement player in less than a day to meet the deadline for roster locks.

With Xynew, DarkZero went on to win the NA Regional Finals. Xynew was the region's top kill leader with 82 Split 2 Pro League kills and his DarkZero teammate, Zer0, finished in second with 78. Although DarkZero won the Regional Finals, their 114 Pro League points ranked second in the region to XSET's 133. Miron "Effect" Novikov finishing as the EMEA region's season kill leader with 114, helping lead Alliance to win the region's finals. Alliance also led the region with 143 points. Fnatic (APAC North), Moist (APAC South), and F/A Players (SA) led their regions with 129, 151, and 143 points, respectively.

== Split 2 Playoffs ==
Due to the playoff points earned at the Split 1 Playoffs LAN, the following teams qualified for the Split 2 Playoffs: TSM, NRG, Acend, XSET, Alliance, Moist Esports and ONIC Esports. Points accrued from the Split 2 Pro League were also considered for Split 2 Playoffs qualification; winners of a Pro League regional final qualified for the Split 2 LAN event. The results of the Split 2 Playoffs determined the final leaderboard standings of the Global Series, as well as Championship-qualifying teams via circuit points.

Held from July 13–16, the Split 2 Playoffs LAN was also held at the Copper Box Arena in London. The event saw a sold-out crowd as well as the introduction of team merchandise booths. Like with the Split 1 Playoffs LAN, a US$1 million prize pool was set for the Split 2 Playoffs, with US$30,000 being won by the first-place finishers. Once again, a total of 40 teams competed at the LAN event. The number of teams which qualified for the Split 2 Playoffs LAN varied per region; including the regional Pro League Finals winners, 11 from North America qualified, as did 10 from the EMEA region, 9 from APAC North, and 5 each from both APAC South and South America.

The 40 qualified teams first played in a group stage, in which they were placed into four groups of 10 teams each. Each of the groups played a 6-game series against the other groups, for a total of 18 games. Following this stage, the 20 highest-scoring teams are placed into a winner's bracket, whereas the other 20 teams are placed into a loser's bracket. The initial loser's bracket is played first, where the 20 teams play six matches with the standard ALGS scoring system in place. The bottom ten teams from this bracket are eliminated and placed from 31st through 40th, whereas the top ten teams advance to Round 2 of the Loser's Bracket. The Winner's Bracket similarly played a six-game series, with the top ten teams advancing directly to the finals. Meanwhile, the other ten teams were paired with the top ten teams from the Loser's Bracket to then play the second round of the Loser's Bracket. The top ten teams from this round advanced to the finals.

The Split 2 Playoffs Finals were played under a Match Point ruleset, which featured no set limit to number of games played. The ten teams who reached the Finals through the Winners Bracket began the Finals with up to ten points, based on their placement in the initial Winner's Bracket, whereas each of the teams that advanced to the Finals via the Loser's Bracket began with zero points.

North American orgs performed strongly at the Split 2 Playoffs, with all top five-finishing teams coming from the region. DarkZero placed first at the Split 2 Playoffs, with TSM coming in second. The Split 2 Playoffs was noted for continuing the rivalry between two teams.

With a 55% pick rate, Seer was often selected during the Split 2 Playoffs, despite downgrades being made to his scanning abilities ahead of the LAN. Rewarding consistent fire and valuable in short-range engagements, the Prowler was by far the weapon with the most registered kills at the Split 2 Playoffs, and also had the second-most damage behind the Nemesis.

After a disappointing 37th-place finish with Furia at the ALGS Split 2 Playoffs, Jacob "HisWattson" McMillin retired from competitive Apex but remained with the org as a content creator.

== Last Chance Qualifiers ==
Held following the Split 2 Playoffs, the Last Chance Qualifiers (LCQ) presented a final opportunity for teams to qualify for the ALGS Championship LAN. Each of the five regions held a qualifier that initially did not qualify for the Championship but still finished high in the Split 2 standings. Each region sent their top 2 finishing teams in LCQ play to the Championship. Teams that qualified for the 2023 ALGS Championship via the LCQ included The Dojo, Iron Blood Gaming, and SAF Esports.

== 2023 ALGS Championship ==
The 2023 ALGS Championship was originally scheduled to be held in London. However, in July, EA announced a change in venue for the tournament to Resorts World Arena in Birmingham, England. Jasmine Chiang, a brand marketing manager for Apex esports expressed a desire to explore "bigger" opportunities for the series. She cited one fan who drove from China to London for the Split 2 Playoffs event as an example of the fan enthusiasm that led her to seek a larger venue for the Championship LAN. The Birmingham LAN was organized to have a festival likeness and included meet-and-greet events with players, as well as merchandise booths and giveaway events.

Held from September 6–10, the Championship tournament had a US$2 million prize pool, with US$600,000 being awarded to the winners. Like with the 2022 Championship, 40 teams were placed into four groups of ten with groups being determined by teams' playoff points earned throughout the ALGS season.

Prior to the Championship, the meta for ALGS play shifted away from frequent usage of Seer for his scanning abilities and to favoring Bangalore and Catalyst, characters who heavily restrict an enemy's vision. The latter meta was dubbed "Can't see shit" by players.

Due to their wins at the previous two LAN events, as well as the prowess of their respective IGLs, TSM and DarkZero were considered favorites to win the Championship LAN by Apex commentators and media writers. However, DarkZero were unable to replicate their Split 2 success. Although they placed first following the group stage, they missed qualification to the finals by one point, narrowly placing 11th in the Winner's Bracket. They then placed 13th in Round 2 of the Loser's Bracket, being eliminated from further contention in the tournament.

TSM, meanwhile, struggled in the group stage of tournament. They faced considerable pressure as multiple other teams reached match point eligibility prior to or alongside them, including OpTic, The Dojo, BLVKHVND, LG Chivas, DreamFire, and FaZe. TSM ultimately turned their fortunes as they won the final three matches of the tournament in a row, winning the Championship and securing them a second LAN victory for the season. Hal was once again named the MVP of the tournament, though he called the award "redundant" stating that because IGLs are almost always awarded MVPs in Apex, the award "loses value". His teammate, Verhulst, won the EA Positive Play Award, given for sportsmanship. Despite reaching match point eligibility after just three matches, OpTic placed second in the tournament. Nine teams ultimately reached match point, with the North America region once again providing the majority of the highest-placing teams.

Played in the wake of the "Can't see shit" meta, Bangalore (78.61%) and Catalyst (77.58%) were indeed the most-selected characters; Horizon (67.49%) was often paired with them, as her kit's mobility and positioning optimization helped balance the former two characters' more defensive abilities. The R-99, suitable for mid- to close-range fights that were emphasized by the "Can't see shit" meta, was by a wide margin the most used weapon at the Championship LAN.

== Media ==
ALGS media was streamed on the "PlayApex" Twitch and "ALGS" YouTube channels, as well as the official Apex esports channel on Steam. The Split 1 Playoffs LAN's official broadcasting talent included Raynday, Spidertiff, Falloutt, VikkiKitty, Onset, Gaskin, Tsquared, GlitterXplosion, and Genome. The tournament also had a B-stream hosted by casters NiceWigg and Greek, which was streamed on the former's Twitch channel.

NiceWigg and Greek's stream was one of four official watch parties held for the Split 2 Playoffs, while the other three were hosted by additional partners in Portuguese, French, and Chinese. The Split 2 Playoffs had official broadcast partners which held Japanese, Thai, Mandarin, Spanish, and Hindi co-streams of the event. As a promotion, Respawn rolled out a "Twitch drop" campaign, which gifted players free in-game cosmetics by watching on the PlayApex channel, as well as official watch parties and broadcast partners. ALGS organizers stated the Split 2 Playoffs drew 570,000 peak viewers and over 10.5 million total hours watched across official channels.
