= ImperialHal =

American professional Apex Legends player

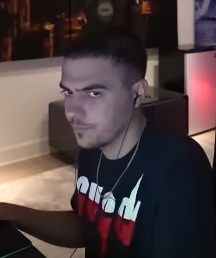
- ImperialHal in 2023

Personal information
- Name: Phillip Dosen
- Born: May 31, 1999 (age 27)
- Nationality: American

Career information
- Game: H1Z1; Fortnite; Apex Legends
- Playing career: 2018–present

Team history
- 2018: Cloud9
- 2019–2024: Team SoloMid
- 2024–present: Team Falcons

Career highlights and awards
- ALGS Champion (2023); 2× ALGS Split Playoffs winner (2022 Split 1, (Note: The 2021–22 ALGS Split 1 Playoffs were regional. As part of TSM, ImperialHal was a winner of the North American Regional playoffs for this Split.) 2023 Split 1); 2× Monster MVP (2023 Split 1, 2023 ALGS Championship); 3× ALGS Pro League – NA region winner (2022 Split 1, 2024 Split 2, 2025 Split 1); ALGS Open (2025)

Twitch information
- Channel: imperialhal__
- Followers: 2.0 million
- Last updated: May 15, 2024

Phillip Dosen (born May 31, 1999), better known by his online alias and gaming handle ImperialHal (or simply Hal), is an American professional Apex Legends player currently playing for Team Falcons.

Nicknamed "the CEO", Hal played as the In-Game Leader (IGL) for Team SoloMid (TSM) from 2019 to 2024. With TSM, he won three Apex Legends Global Series (ALGS) LAN tournaments, including the 2023 ALGS Championship. He left TSM in 2024 and was signed to Team Falcons, a Saudi esports organization.

== Esports career ==
=== TSM (2019–2024) ===
ImperialHal has competed professionally in H1Z1 and Fortnite, though he is most notable for his Apex Legends play. He has played Apex Legends competitively since the game released in 2019. He played on Cloud9's H1Z1 roster in 2018, though once the team disbanded, he began playing Fortnite. He was then signed to play Apex for TSM in March 2019, alongside Jose "ProdigyAces" Soto and Taylor "THump" Humphries. Hal would be a mainstay for TSM and would eventually be joined by Jordan "Reps" Wolfe, who would be his long-time teammate until 2024. Over their time together, they were joined by several players in the third spot on the TSM roster including Mac "Albralelie" Beckwith, Eric "Snip3down" Wrona, and Evan "Verhulst" Verhulst.

He was a winner of both the EXP Invitational – Apex Legends at X Games Minneapolis event, as well as the Apex Legends Preseason Invitational; both invitationals took place in 2019. In 2020, the Apex Legends Global Series (ALGS) was launched by Apex's publisher and developer, Electronic Arts (EA) and Respawn Entertainment, respectively.

In December 2021, Verhulst joined TSM and the Hal/Reps/Verhulst trio would be successful in ALGS play. TSM won the 2022 ALGS Split 1 Playoffs, a North American regional LAN. Prior to the win, it had been nearly a year since Hal and TSM won a major tournament. The team experienced further struggles later in 2022, placing sixth in the Split 2 Playoffs and seventh in the ALGS Championship. During the latter, Hal instructed his teammates to not shoot at a Scarz player, noticing his connection to the game's server had crashed. Viewers and fellow competitors praised Hal's sportsmanship. The team's lackluster performances at these LAN tournaments frustrated Hal who stated "I'm tired of fucking losing, bro," and suggested he was considering "either not playing competitive anymore or just joining another team".

For the 2022 Twitch Rivals LAN event at TwitchCon 2022, Hal partnered with "Sweetdreams" and "ReedzFPS"; the trio won the event. Hal and TSM would win the 2023 ALGS Split 1 Playoffs LAN. Hal's win made him the first player to win an international tournament as both a mouse and keyboard (MnK) and controller player. He was also named the tournament's MVP. Later that year, Hal led TSM to victory in the 2023 ALGS Championship LAN and was awarded the tournament's MVP trophy. In December 2023, Hal participated in the Apex Rising Charity Pro-AM event, helping raise money for the Product Red, an AIDS awareness and prevention charity.

A hacker disrupted the 2024 ALGS North American Split 1 Pro League Finals. Hal was affected by the hack, being gifted aimbot during a match. Hal stayed in the match, though refrained to shoot until the server was shut down by admins. Hal and Verhulst were given bans and competitive cooldowns. Ahead of the 2024 ALGS Split 1 Playoffs, Hal joined the Red Bull Gaming team. TSM had a disappointing 17th-place finish at the Split 1 Playoffs LAN.

=== Team Falcons (2024–present) ===
On May 13, Hal announced his departure from TSM and that he would be joining Rhys "Zer0" Perry and Noyan "Genburten" Ozkose from TSM's rival DarkZero. Though it was initially unclear if the three would play for DarkZero or another organization, on May 28, it was announced the trio signed with Team Falcons, a Saudi-based organization believed to be connected to the Saudi royal family. ImperialHal and Team Falcons won the 2025 ALGS Open, which featured a record-breaking 160 teams participating and a $1,000,000 prize pool. The team secured $300,000 with their victory. In an interview after the tournament, Hal cited League of Legends champion Faker as an inspiration.

== Player and streamer profile ==
Known for his aggressive style of play and previously serving as the IGL (in-game leader) of TSM, ImperialHal is considered one of the greatest Apex players of all time. During his time with TSM, the team was often a favorite to win tournaments. His Apex success has earned him the nickname "The CEO". He originally played as an MnK player, before switching to controller and becoming known as a dual-input player, frequently switching between the two. He is also the highest-earning Apex player of all time.

Hal has also garnered a reputation as one of the biggest Apex streamers through his presence on Twitch. In 2022, Adam Snavely of Dot Esports wrote that "The TSM leader pulls double duty as both the most successful pro player in the history of Apex and the game's most popular streamer. If there is a person that is an embodiment of Apex, it is ImperialHal: skillful, tactical, loud, and confident. Always confident." His opinions on the game, such as new character introductions or meta changes, have been often discussed by esports media outlets. In April 2022, it was announced he signed to UTA. A high-profile streamer, Hal has also been the target of several swatting incidents.

In 2023, Hal was named Tournament MVP of the ALGS Championship after leading TSM to victory, and he also earned two Monster Energy MVP awards that year at the Split 1 Playoffs and the ALGS Championship. He was later nominated for Best Esports Athlete at The Game Awards 2023. In May 2024, Hal departed TSM after five years to join Team Falcons, forming a team with Zer0 and Genburten. With Falcons, he won the 2024 Split 2 Pro League (North America) and finished as runner-up at the 2024 Esports World Cup. In 2025, Hal and Falcons won the ALGS Open, a 160-team global event with a $1,000,000 prize pool, where he earned $300,000 in winnings. By 2025, his total career tournament earnings surpassed $1,000,000 USD.

== Awards and honors ==
ImperialHal was nominated for the "Best Battle Royale Streamer" category at the 2021 Streamer Awards. He was also nominated for "Best Esports Athlete" at The Game Awards 2023.

Award	Year	Category	Result	Ref.
The Game Awards	2023	Best Esports Athlete	Nominated	
The Streamer Awards	2021	Best Battle Royale Streamer	Nominated	
The Streamer Awards	2026	Best Battle Royale Streamer	Pending	
