= ALGS Year 1 =

- League: ALGS
- Sport: Apex Legends
- Duration: January 25, 2020–June 13, 2021 (Note: This includes the May 22–June 13, 2021 dates for the ALGS Championship. Due to the COVID-19 pandemic, the ALGS Championship was held online as opposed to in-person via LAN tournament. As a result, the Championship was split regionally and a champion was named for each of the five regions: North America (NA); South America (SA); Europe, the Middle East, and Africa (EMEA); Asia–Pacific North (APAC North); and Asia–Pacific South (APAC South).)

ALGS Championship
- Champions: Kungarna NA (NA); Paradox Esports (SA); Scarz (EMEA); Fennel Korea (APAC North); Wolfpack Arctic (APAC South)

ALGS seasons
- 2021–22 →

The 2020–21 Apex Legends Global Series (ALGS) season or ALGS Year 1 was the first season of ALGS play. The series is organized by the game's publisher and developer, Electronic Arts (EA) and Respawn Entertainment, respectively.

The season began on January 25, 2020, when the series' first online tournament was held. Impacted by the COVID-19 pandemic, the season concluded with the North American regional finals on June 13, 2021. The series was competed in different regions including North America (NA); South America (SA); Europe, the Middle East, and Africa (EMEA); Asia–Pacific North (APAC North), which paired Japan and South Korea; and Asia–Pacific South (APAC South), which grouped Southeast Asia, Australia, and New Zealand. For portions of the season, the Americas were grouped into the same regional play.

== Background and announcement ==
Apex Legends is a battle royale-hero shooter. Developed by Respawn Entertainment and published by Electronic Arts, it was released on the PS4, Xbox One, and PC platforms in February 2019. The game received a positive critical reception upon its release and went on to win the award for Best Multiplayer Game at The Game Awards 2019 ceremony in December.

During its first year of release, the esports scene around Apex included a "pub stomp"-formatted tournament hosted by Twitch Rivals. In July, EA and Respawn announced the Apex Legends Preseason Invitational tournament, featuring 80 teams competing for a $500,000 prize pool; the tournament took place from September 13–15, in Kraków, Poland. Support for professional Apex from esports organizations dwindled during the year, including 100 Thieves disbanding their Apex roster.

On December 17, EA announced an open tournament dubbed the "Apex Legends Global Series", or ALGS. The announcement breathed new interest into the game's esports scene, with orgs like Rogue and Luminosity Gaming making new roster signings. The first ALGS season's prize pool was set at USD$3 million. EA and Respawn contracted third-party companies GLL and PGL as event production partners. GLL handled practice lobbies for the ALGS. Lenovo also sponsored the ALGS, with its Lenovo Legion being the series' PC and monitor partner. John Nelson served as the ALGS' commissioner during the season.

This first edition of ALGS play saw the release of different seasons of the game, (Note: Sources citing examples of this include:) which are often accompanied by new characters, weapons, and purchasable cosmetic items. For example, season 6 of the game (dubbed "Boosted") was rolled out in August 2020, introducing Rampart and updating the World's Edge map, which was used in professional ALGS play. The gameplay of professional Apex features a frequently changing meta and players were noted to incorporate different playstyles or use different characters throughout the ALGS season. The EMEA region featured a more "experimental" meta, whereas North American teams followed a "notoriously on-meta grain". These meta changes also came in the form of game balancing updates, such as a nerf to Valkyrie's tactical hover ahead of the 2021 ALGS Championships.

== Format and schedule ==
Though organized as an open tournament, eligible players "must live in one of 60 approved countries and meet minimum age and PC processing requirements". 16 was set as the minimum age for players, unless they live in Japan (17), Russia, or South Korea (both 18). The series was organized on PC. The ALGS schedule was originally set 12 live events, ten online tournaments, and other events. Players begin the series by competing in online tournaments and live "Challenger Events", with berths to live Premier and Major Events at stake. Challenger Events saw players compete against others from their own countries, while Premier Events were regional. The highest-level of competition, Majors were set to be invitational with the highest-point total players being invited. These points were determined by a match point system which was previously used in the Apex Legends Preseason Invitational tournament held earlier in the year.

Four Majors were planned, with the first three supposed to include 100 three-person squads (or trios) competing against each other; the fourth, intended as a grand final, was meant to have just 60 players competing. The first Major was scheduled to held from March 13–15, 2020, in Arlington, Texas. EA cancelled the event due to the COVID-19 pandemic. EA also announced the indefinite postponement of the GLL Paris Premier Event and the PGL Bucharest Premier Event #2, live events originally scheduled for April 24–26 and May 30–31, respectively. Online events, such as qualifiers initially continued as scheduled. However, as a result of the pandemic, EA and Repawn considerably adjusted their ALGS plans, going on to organize exclusively online regional tournaments; they held Summer and Autumn Circuits in 2020, before hosting a Winter Circuit and the ALGS Championships in 2021.

== Online tournaments ==
The first online tournament was held on January 25, 2020. Although the Arlington Major was cancelled as a result of the COVID-19 pandemic, EA announced that the Global Series Online Tournament #2 taking place from March 21–23 would continue as scheduled. A total of six online tournaments took place through May; online tournaments #3–6 began on April 4, April 18, May 2, and May 30, respectively. Online Tournament #3 had a prize pool of USD$100,000.

== Summer Circuit ==
In May 2020, EA and Respawn announced a remote Summer Circuit tournament taking place from June 20 through September 13. Four "Super Regional" tournaments were scheduled from June through August, with the regional groupings being: EMEA (Europe, Middle East, and Africa), the Americas, APAC North (Japan and South Korea), and APAC South (Greater Southeast Asia, Australia, and New Zealand). Last Chance Qualifiers (LCQ) took place on August 16, with playoffs taking place on September 12 and 13. The Summer Circuit was open to players meeting the eligibility criteria of having achieved a Gold IV rank on PC in Split 1 of Series 4 by June 18. The Battlefly website was used for registration, which opened on June 9. The Summer Circuit had a $500,000 prize pool. Qualifiers for the circuit began on June 21. Over 2,000 teams competed for a spot in the Summer Circuit's playoffs.

== Autumn Circuit ==
The ALGS held its Autumn Circuit from October 3 through December 20. The LCQ took place in December, with the playoffs occurring on December 19 and 20. The prize pool for the Autumn Circuit was once again $500,000.

== Winter Circuit ==
In December 2020, EA and Respawn announced its Winter Circuit, which ran from January 15 through March 28, 2021. The total prize pool for the Winter Circuit was set at USD$750,000, with USD$503,000 of the pool being set aside for the circuit's Playoffs. The Winter Circuit featured five regions: North America (NA), South America (SA), APAC North (Korea and Japan), APAC South (Southeast Asia, Australia, and New Zealand), and EMEA (Europe, Middle East, and Africa). The circuit was played on the World's Edge map and on the game's Season 7 version, which released in October 2020 and introduced the character Horizon. Although Season 8 was rolled out during the circuit's run, players remained playing on Season 7 and were not allowed to play as Fuse.

The Winter Circuit broadcasting schedule included:

- Winter Circuit Online Tournament #1 (WC OT) on January 31, 2021.
- WC OT #2 on February 21, 2021.
- WC OT #3 on February 28, 2021.
- WC OT #4 on March 7, 2021.
- The Winter Circuit Playoffs on March 27 and 28, 2021.

Additionally, the Winter Circuit's LCQ took place on March 21, but was not aired. NRG narrowly won the Winter Circuit in the North American region, finishing with a total of 79 points; their roster included Nathan "Nafen" Nguyen, Aidan "rocker" Gordin, and Chris "sweetdreams" Sexton. Over in the EMEA region, FlavorOfTheMonth had a dominant win, finishing with 80 points, 16 more than the second-place finisher.

== ALGS Championships ==
The ALGS Championships took place from May 22 through June 13, 2021; its group stage was held on May 22, and the Championship Finals took place from June 5–13. EA and Respawn initially set the total prize pool for the championship tournaments at USD$1 million. They later announced a crowdfunding effort to raise the prize pool to a capped amount of USD$3 million, with item bundles on Apex's in-game store boosting the prize pool. EA contributed $5 for each bundle purchased, and $20 for each "Animal Kingdom" bundle purchased; the Animal Kingdom bundle was an "all-encompassing bundle containing all of" the items that contributed to raising the prize pool. The crowdfunding model was similar to the fundraising model used by The International, a Dota 2 tournament. The prize pool was ultimately set at USD$2.58 million.

The format for the championships featured a total of 40 teams in each of the NA and EMEA regions. Meanwhile, 30 teams competed in each of the three other regions' championships. Group stages featured 10 teams each, following a round-robin schedule. After the round-robin, total points determined which 20 teams (from each region) would clinch berths to their regional Championship Finals.

Kungarna was the North American region's champion. Scarz won the EMEA regional championship. The org's roster comprised Mikkel "Mande" Hestbek, Can "Taisheen" Öztürk and Dan "rprx" Ušić, who were picked up in March ahead of the Winter Circuit finals. Fire Beavers, who qualified for the tournament through the LCQ, finished in second. Fennel and Wolfpack Arctic were the champions of the APAC North and South regions, respectively, while Paradox Esports was the South American region's champion.

== Broadcasting ==
Online tournaments had their finals broadcast on Twitch and YouTube. The Winter Circuit was live streamed on official Apex Legends accounts on Twitch, YouTube, and Mildom. Multiple co-casters also streamed their own broadcasts of the tournament. Apex players who viewed official streams earned in-game rewards via Twitch drops. The Winter Circuit's broadcasting also employed a "freecam", or a spectator mode, to freely track gameplay. According to Respawn, the Winter Circuit saw an increase of more than 50% in average audience per minute during the playoffs, reaching over 100,000 viewers in the process.

== See also ==
- Impact of the COVID-19 pandemic on the video game industry
