= ALGS Year 2 =

- League: ALGS
- Sport: Apex Legends

Split 1 Playoffs

Split 2 Playoffs
- Champions: Reignite

2022 Championship
- Champions: DarkZero

ALGS seasons
- ← 2020–21 2022–23 →

The 2021–22 Apex Legends Global Series (ALGS) season or ALGS Year 2 was the second season of ALGS play. The series is organized by the game's publisher and developer, Electronic Arts (EA) and Respawn Entertainment, respectively.

== Game background and meta ==
Apex Legends is a battle royale-hero shooter. Developed by Respawn Entertainment and published by Electronic Arts, it was released on the PS4, Xbox One, and PC platforms in February 2019. The game received a positive critical reception upon its release and went on to win the award for Best Multiplayer Game at The Game Awards 2019 ceremony in December. That month, EA announced an open tournament dubbed the "Apex Legends Global Series", or ALGS. The announcement led esports organizations to create Apex rosters.

In February 2022, the map "Storm Point" was added to the ALGS' competitive map pool alongside "World's Edge".

== Schedule and format ==
The second year of the ALGS introduced a pro league and challenger circuit format, divided across five regions (North America, South America, EMEA, APAC North, and APAC South). Upon announcing ALGS Year 2, EA laid out the season's schedule as:

- Preseason Qualifiers: September–October, 2021
- Pro League Regular Season - Split 1: October–December 2021
- Challenger Circuit - Split 1: October–December 2021
- Split 2 Pro League Qualifiers: January 2022
- Split 1 Playoffs: January 2022
- Pro League Regular Season - Split 2: February–March 2022
- Challenger Circuit - Split 2: February–March 2022
- Split 2 Playoffs: May 2022
- Championship Last Chance Qualifiers: May 2022
- Year 2 - ALGS Championship: July 2022

Tournaments for the year were played under a match point format. In the format, any team that crossed the match point threshold of 50 points would clinch an overall tournament victory by then winning an additional game.

== Split 1 ==
The previous season had its tournaments forced online due to COVID-19-related restrictions. EA and Respawn intended for in-person playoff LAN tournaments for ALGS Year 2, though those plans were scrapped for the ALGS Pro League Split 1 playoffs, due to travel restrictions. COVID-related restrictions once again had a logistical impact on the ALGS schedule during Year 2. The winners of the regional Pro Leagues during Split 1 were: TSM (North America), NEW Esports (EMEA), Riddle Order (APAC North), DreamFire (APAC South), and Team Singularity (South America).

== Split 2 ==
The Split 2 Playoffs LAN Tournament was held in Stockholm and began on April 29, 2022. Led by their in-game leader (IGL) Zer0, Reignite won the Split 2 LAN Tournament. The team was playing without Genburten, one of their key players; due to testing positive for COVID-19, he was substituted for JMW. Reignite finished with the LAN with 78 points, nine ahead of second-place Team Liquid.

== ALGS Championship ==
Running from July 7 to 10, 2022, the ALGS Championship was held as a LAN tournament at PNC Arena in Raleigh, North Carolina. COVID policies and travel restrictions affected the tournament, with many players failing to secure travel visas and left unable to attend. Some players were vocally critical of EA's COVID policies.

Following their Split 2 LAN victory, the players on Reignite's roster were signed by DarkZero Esports. DarkZero went on to win the ALGS Championship. The championship's prize pool was $2 million, with DarkZero winning the top prize of $500,000.
