= Aim assist =

Video game feature

In video games, aim assist is a gameplay feature designed to help players with their aiming. It is commonly found in first-person shooter (FPS) games, and is an element particularly designed for players who use controller inputs, as opposed to a mouse and keyboard (MnK).

== Background and description ==
Aiming down the sights or scope of a gun is a key component of first-person shooters. Allowing for more precise movements and aiming, the mouse and keyboard is considered the easier and more intuitive input. With a controller's thumbsticks being harder to use, developers of FPS games include aim assist as tool for those using controllers.

The aim assist function helps guide a controller player's crosshairs automatically. Contemporary player versus player (PvP) games employ the feature by way of "slowing down crosshair movement when an enemy enters a certain range of the player's crosshair." Games also have been noted to include aim assist as a feature that can be toggled off. An element of aim assist is zoom snapping, which Morgan Park of PC Gamer described as an "invisible force that guides a controller player's reticle to an enemy's head or body when aiming as long as they're looking in the enemy's direction, and keeps the aim locked there for a time".

Some players have utilized third-party re-mapping programs, a software that spoofs their MnK input to trick a console into thinking they are using a controller. This allows for the player to receive benefits from a mouse's precision and the aim assist setting. In response, developers use anti-cheat software to detect these third party re-mapping programs and have banned players for using them.

== History ==
With the rise of games employing crossplay, aim assist began to be more considered by players, developers, and video game media writers. PC players largely use the MnK input, though the aim assist feature is usually available for all controller players, even when they play on PC platforms. Such players have expressed feelings that aim assist is an overpowered mechanic, giving controller players an unfair advantage. Often times, developers of games including the mechanic have "politely ignored" requests to nerf the feature. Indeed, instances of patches to the feature designed to tone down its perceived advantages, such as with The Finals' 1.4.1 patch in January 2024, are considered rare. This particular patch addressed zoom snapping and camera magnetism elements of aim assist, as well as prohibiting clients running key remapping programs on PC access to the feature. The complete disabling of the feature in PC–console crossplay matches has been another response from developers, though this is not an available route for games that do not present an option for players to disable crossplay.

=== In esports ===
Though players have stated concerns about unfair advantages allowed by the tool, aim assist is not considered "cheating". Players have indeed been noted to actively switch from MnK to controller for competitive advantages. As an intentional feature of games, the aim assist tool is used in professional esports. After winning the ALGS Year 3 Split 1 Playoffs tournament, the professional Apex Legends player ImperialHal cited his switching to controller as helping improve his play.

=== In other genres ===
Though it is often discussed in the context of the FPS genre and PvP settings, aim assist has been noted to exist in other types of games. The role-playing game (RPG) Diablo IV, which features player versus environment (PvE) gameplay, has an auto aim system. The feature can be turned off in the game's settings.

== See also ==
- Aimbot
- Auto-aim
