= NiceWigg =

American streamer (born 1997)

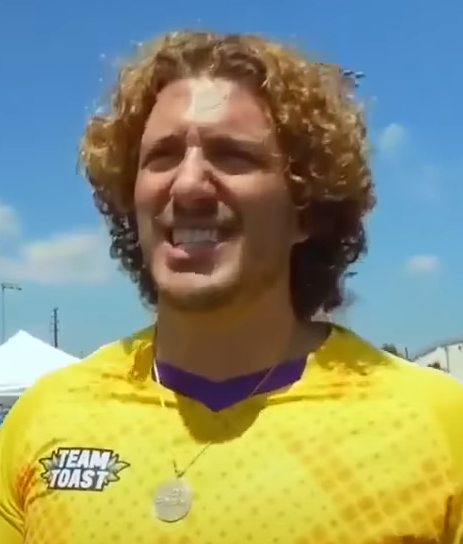
- NiceWigg in 2025

Personal information
- Name: Jack Martin
- Born: May 5, 1997 (age 29)
- Nationality: American

Career information
- Game: Apex Legends
- Playing career: 2019–2023

Team history
- 2019–2020: CLG
- 2020: Yeet Squad
- 2021: SHEEEEEEESH
- 2023: The Dojo

Twitch information
- Channel: NiceWigg
- Years active: 2019–present
- Followers: 855,000

YouTube information
- Channel: NiceWigg
- Years active: 2019–present
- Genre: Gaming
- Subscribers: 206,000
- Views: 66,998,071 views
- Last updated: March 27, 2025

Jack Martin (born May 5, 1997), better known by his online alias NiceWigg, is an American Apex Legends streamer and caster. A former professional player, he transitioned to streaming full-time on Twitch and casting for Apex. He is a co-owner of the gaming organization 100 Thieves.

== Playing career ==
Early in his pursuit to a professional gamer and streamer, NiceWigg was working as a personal trainer in New York. In April 2019, he played a game with "Dizzy", who NiceWigg referred to as "the biggest Apex streamer in the world". The exposure from Dizzy's stream helped NiceWigg earn an increased following on his own Twitch account, and in May, he was signed to Counter Logic Gaming (CLG)'s Apex Legends roster. He competed as a controller player on PC; his signing to CLG made him the first ever controller player signed to a professional Apex organization. With CLG, NiceWigg competed at the NewEgg FragFest at the Luxor's HyperX Esports Arena in Las Vegas in September, as well as the Apex Legends Preseason Invitational in Poland. Also in 2019, he competed in the EXP Invitational - Apex Legends at X Games Minneapolis event. He also later competed in the Apex Legends Global Series (ALGS).

NiceWigg later played with "Socks" and "bowswer", with the trio forming the "Yeet Squad". They played in the 2020 ALGS Summer Circuit - Super Regional 1 tournament. In October 2021, NiceWigg joined "iiTzTimmy" and "Apryze" to play under the team name "SHEEEEEEESH". They performed well in Apex North American regional qualifiers, earning a spot in the ALGS Pro League. The team paused competing together, in result skipping a Pro League match and rendering them ineligible for play. NiceWigg originally stated the team was suspended, but Chris Pipher, Senior Manager of ALGS Operations at Electronic Arts (EA), challenged NiceWigg's statement. Pipher asserted the team was disbanded, "just like every other team that has skipped a match in the Pro League". Shortly thereafter, NiceWigg issued an apology for what he called a "false claim", stating he should have been more knowledgeable on the ALGS rules. In the offseason between ALGS Year 3 and 4, NiceWigg joined iiTzTimmy and Verhulst as a member of The Dojo, an orgless team, for one North American unofficial match, called a scrimmage or "scrims" by Apex pro players.

NiceWigg no longer competes professionally, with media outlets describing him as a former professional player.

== Streaming and casting career ==
In addition to playing Apex, NiceWigg also streams and casts for the game. On his streams, he has been documented voicing his opinions on new characters, as well as the meta changes made to the game. In October 2019, he achieved 18,000 viewers on an Apex stream that Shroud hosted with him. That December, NiceWigg held a charity stream, raising over $10,000 for St. Jude Children's Research Hospital.

In September 2021, NiceWigg signed to 100 Thieves as a content creator. At the time of his signing, he had amassed over 400,000 followers on Twitch and nearly 100,000 subscribers on his YouTube channel. In August 2023, NiceWigg joined Jacob "HisWattson" McMillan's efforts to sponsor monthly Apex tournaments for women.

As a caster, NiceWigg is known for his "B-streams". Along with Athanasios "Greek" Alestas, he was recruited by the ALGS. Their first cast together was at the 2022 ALGS Split 2 Playoffs LAN. For his first broadcast for EA, Apex's publisher, "he brought a shouty, sweary energy to the stream, the complete opposite of the straight-laced, mostly scripted main stream". NiceWigg felt that he enjoyed casting so much, that he believed a full transition from playing to streaming and casting would be preferable. EA was receptive and brought him back for further casting ventures, such as the LAN event in Raleigh, North Carolina. EA has been notably hands-off for the duo's B-stream, which is hosted on NiceWigg's Twitch channel. He has remained a part of the ALGS casting talent since; most recently, he was part of the casting talent lineup for the 2024 ALGS Split 1 Playoffs LAN in Los Angeles.

Writing for Dot Esports, Ethan Davison wrote that in person, the streamer "radiates the same vibrant energy that brings so many fans to his Twitch channel. He sits close and gives the impression that he says exactly what he thinks". NiceWigg was nominated for the "Best Battle Royale Streamer" award at the 2023 Streamer Awards. In February 2024, NiceWiig partnered with Trevor Lawrence at the "Twitch Rivals Streamer Bowl V: Tailgate Edition" event, with the duo winning. In March, Twitch Rivals hosted an Apex tournament with NiceWigg. In December, NiceWigg won Best Battle Royal Streamer at the 2024 Streamer Awards.

In January 2026, NiceWigg announced that he was promoted in 100 Thieves as the new Head of Creator Culture and Talent Strategy, and also joined the ownership group, alongside Valkyrae, CouRageJD, Dan Gilbert, Scooter Braun, Drake, and its founder, Nadeshot.

== Awards and nominations ==
| Year | Ceremony | Category | Result | Ref. |
|---|---|---|---|---|
| 2023 | The Streamer Awards | Best Battle Royale Streamer | Nominated | |
| 2024 | The Streamer Awards | Best Battle Royale Streamer | Won | |
| 2026 | The Streamer Awards | Best Battle Royale Streamer | Pending | |
