= Fire Beavers =

European esports team

- Divisions: Apex Legends
- Founded: 2019
- Dissolved: 2023

Fire Beavers is an inactive European esports team. Founded in 2019, the team competed in professional Apex Legends play, including the Apex Legends Global Series (ALGS) competition. In 2023, the team's players were signed by the Serbian esports organization Aurora Gaming.

== History ==
In August 2019, the team was signed by the Russian esports organization, Gambit Esports. In December, Electronic Arts (EA) and Respawn Entertainment, Apex's publisher and developer, respectively, announced they would be launching the Apex Legends Global Series (ALGS) tournament. Fire Beavers competed in the tournament's EMEA region. During the 2020–21 season (ALGS Year 1), the orgless team competed in the ALGS Championship. That season's championships were limited to regional championships; Fire Beavers placed second in the EMEA region's championship tournament, narrowly losing to Scarz.

Playing as an orgless team for six months, they were one of the last unsigned CIS teams in the EMEA region. In August, heading into the 2021–22 season, the team was signed by Zeta Division, a Japanese esports organization. At the time, their roster consisted of players Kiryl "9impulse" Kostsiu, Lev "taskmast33r" Grigoriev, and Danila "Sunset" Soloviov. They found moderate success during the season, finishing 12th in Pro League play and 18th in the 2022 ALGS Championship. They left Zeta on 15 July 2022. Their roster was reformed during the offseason with Sunset leaving the team and the additions of Svyatoslav "ojrein" Korochinsky in the third spot, as well as coach Nikita "clawz" Marchinsky.

They would once again play as an orgless EMEA region team for the 2022–23 season (ALGS Year 3). They finished in fourth-place in their Pro League play. Dot Esports noted that they were one of the region's more successful teams heading into 2023. Writing for the outlet, Adam Snavely said they "figured to be one of the favorites" of the 2023 ALGS Split 1 Playoffs. In regional play ahead of the tournament, they had the most kills and damage. They were unable to compete in the tournament, however, as they encountered visa issues.

They competed in the 2023 ALGS Split 2 Pro League. They once again finish in fourth-place in the EMEA Pro League and qualified for the 2023 ALGS Split 2 Playoffs. This time around, they were able to secure visas for the tournament, competing in the London playoffs. They finished in 17th-place and secured enough points to qualify for the 2023 ALGS Championship tournament. However, after the Split 2 Playoffs, they were signed by Aurora Gaming.
