= Six Invitational =

Annual Rainbow Six Siege tournament

- Sport: Rainbow Six Siege
- Founded: 2015; 11 years ago
- Administrator: Ubisoft
- No. of teams: 6 teams (2017); 16 teams (2018–2020); 20 teams (2021–present)
- Venue: Rotating locations
- Most recent champion: FaZe Clan (2nd title)
- Most titles: FaZe Clan; G2 Esports (2 titles each)
- Broadcasters: Twitch, YouTube
- Tournament format: Group stage; Round robin; Main event; Double elimination
- Website: ubisoft.com/esports/rainbow-six/siege

Six Invitational (SI) is an annual world championship tournament for the five-on-five esports video game Rainbow Six Siege. Produced by the game's developer Ubisoft, Six Invitational is the final event of the competitive Siege season and consists of 20 teams, 16 based on the final results from the Season Global Standings and four from Europe, North America, Latin America, and Asia Pacific regional qualifiers. SI was first held in Montreal, home of the Ubisoft studio working on the game, until it began to be hosted internationally starting with Six Invitational 2021.

The most recent champion is FaZe Clan, who won Six Invitational 2026 after winning the year prior.

== Format ==
The Six Invitational 2020 announced enormous changes to both the game itself and the competitive scene. The changes included the end of Pro League and a new points-based system. These changes to the competitive scene have been compared to that of Dota 2 and League of Legends. The 20 participating teams are broken up into four groups of five. In each group, every team plays each other once. The top four teams from each group advance to the playoffs, while the fifth place teams are eliminated. The playoffs use a double-elimination bracket, with the top three teams from each group advancing to the upper bracket and the fourth place teams entering the lower bracket. Each playoff game is played as a best-of-three series and the grand final is a best-of-five series.

== Tournaments ==
List of Six Invitationals
Year	Champions	Runners-up	Teams	Prize Pool	Date	Venue
2017 – Xbox One	Elevate	Team Vitality	6	$100,000	3–5 February	Montreal
2017 – PC	Continuum	eRa Eternity	6	$100,000	3–5 February	Montreal
2018	PENTA Sports	Evil Geniuses	16	$500,000	13–18 February	Ubisoft Montreal Studio (Montreal)
2019	G2 Esports	Team Empire	16	$2,000,000	11–17 February	Place Bell (Montreal)
2020	Spacestation Gaming	Ninjas in Pyjamas	16	$3,000,000	7–16 February	Place Bell (Montreal)
2021	Ninjas in Pyjamas	Team Liquid	20	$3,000,000	11–23 May	Palais Brongniart (Paris)
2022	TSM	Team Empire	20	$3,000,000	8–20 February	Stockholmsmässan (Stockholm)
2023	G2 Esports	w7m esports	20	$3,000,000	7–19 February	Place Bell (Montreal)
2024	w7m esports	FaZe Clan	20	$3,000,000	13–25 February	Ginásio do Ibirapuera (São Paulo)
2025	FaZe Clan	Team BDS	20	$3,000,000	3–16 February	MGM Music Hall at Fenway (Boston)
2026	FaZe Clan	Team Secret	20	$3,000,000	2–15 February	Adidas Arena (Paris)

=== Regions which have reached the final ===
Region	Titles	Runner-up
North America (North America League)	4 (2017 Xbox, 2017 PC, 2020, 2022)	2 (2017 PC, 2018)
South America (Copa Elite Six/Brazil League/South America League)	4 (2021, 2024, 2025, 2026)	4 (2020, 2021, 2023, 2024)
EMEA (European League/Europe MENA League)	3 (2018, 2019, 2023)	5 (2017 Xbox, 2019, 2022, 2025, 2026)
Asia Pacific (APAC League)	–	–
China (China National League)	–	–
