= VikkiKitty =

Esports match commentator

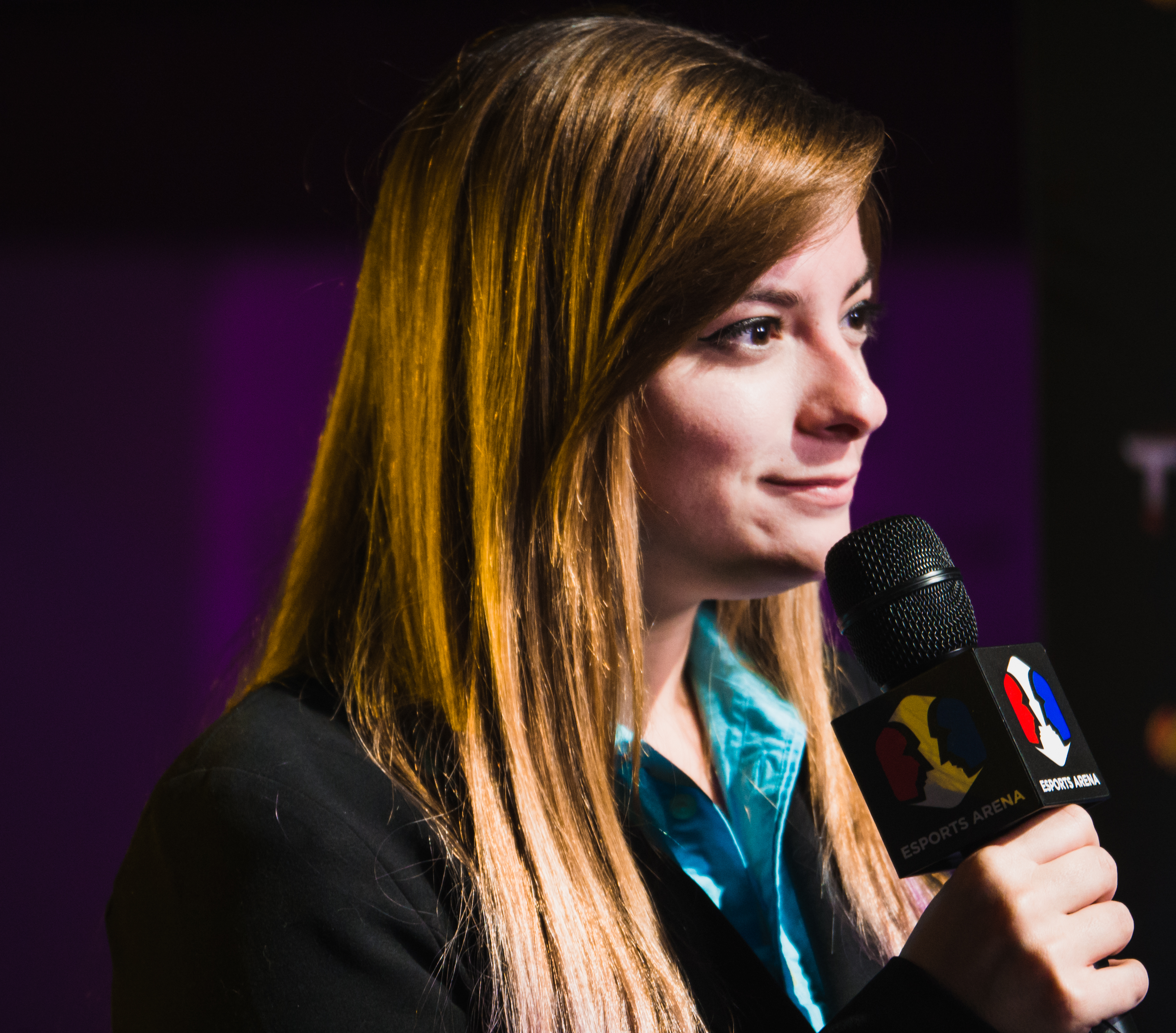
- Vikkikitty at 2GGaming Championship Saga in 2017
- Born: Victoria Perez; April 6, 1996 (age 30)
- Occupation: Match commentator

Esports career information
- Game: Super Smash Bros. for Wii U
- Playing career: 2015
- Sports commentary career
- Sport: Esports
- Employer: World Best Gaming (2019); Thunder Gaming (2019–2020)

Victoria Perez (born April 6, 1996), known professionally as VikkiKitty, is an American esports match commentator who has worked in Super Smash Bros. for Wii U, Super Smash Bros. Ultimate, Overwatch, Arms, Pokkén Tournament, and Apex Legends. She was the first woman to commentate a major Super Smash Bros. event.

== Career ==
Perez played Super Smash Bros. throughout her childhood, but discovered competitive Smash by accident when, in mid-2015, she visited a LAN gaming center that was hosting a tournament.^{4:00} She began traveling to local Fort Lauderdale, Florida tournaments, where she competed in Super Smash Bros. for Wii U. In October of that year, the local tournament organizer recruited Perez to be a match commentator (also referred to as a caster) at his events. Weeks later, she was asked to commentate a larger, regional event, Frame Perfect.

Perez was the first prominent woman caster in Super Smash Bros.^{9:00} In January 2017, Perez cast Smash for Wii U at Genesis 4, a major tournament. In June she was hired by Nintendo to commentate Arms and Pokkén Tournament tournaments at E3. Prior to that event, she had only commentated Smash events. In preparation for E3, she prepared over 40 pages of notes. She also traveled to GamesCon in Germany to commentate for the subsequently cancelled game Breakaway. Later that year commentated Smash for Wii U at EVO 2017 for a broadcast on Disney XD. At the end of the year, she traveled to in Taipei to cast the Overwatch Heroes Rumble, one of the last Overwatch tournaments held before the launch of the Overwatch League. In 2018, Nintendo brought her back to E3, this time to cast the first ever Super Smash Bros. Ultimate tournament, which was held at that event. She also returned to Evo 2018, and to Genesis 5.

She cast several major Smash Ultimate tournaments in 2019, including Genesis 6, Smash Ultimate Summit, and Evo 2019, the largest offline tournament in Super Smash Bros. franchise history. In April she joined esports organization World Best Gaming as a commentator and brand ambassador. The organization folded in August. That same month, she joined Thunder Gaming. She departed Thunder in January of the following year. In January 2020, Perez traveled to Japan to commentate Evo Japan 2020. A month later, she was announced as a caster for Overwatch Contenders, the academy-tier tournament series for Overwatch. In April 2021 it was announced that she would be casting the 2021 season of the Overwatch League.

== Personal life ==
Perez grew up in the greater Miami area in a Cuban American family. She spent much of her childhood as an only child; her younger sister was born when Perez was 8.^{3:30} Growing up, she participated in theater and was a member of a thespian honor society. She grew up playing Smash Bros. titles and described herself as a "Nintendo kid". She spent several years playing Call of Duty: Modern Warfare 2. Her handle, "VikkiKitty", came from a bet she made in that game; another player named "MisterFuzzyKitty" challenged her to an in-game duel, and because she lost, she joined his gaming clan. She has continued to use the handle for over a decade.^{13:00}

She graduated from Florida International University in 2019 with a degree in Mass Communications and Media Broadcast.
