= Apex Legends Global Series =

Professional esports league

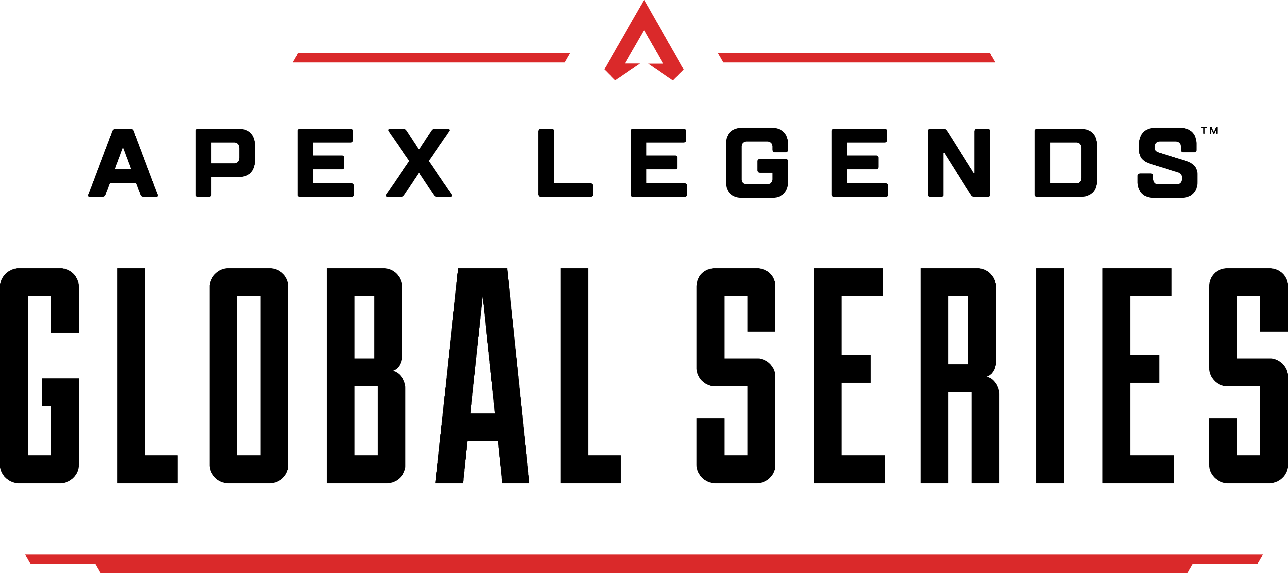
- Game: Apex Legends
- Founded: 2019
- Owners: Electronic Arts; Respawn Entertainment
- Commissioner: John Nelson
- Country: Global
- Most recent champions: Team Falcons (ALGS Open); Oblivion (ALGS Championship)
- Website: www.ea.com/games/apex-legends/compete

The Apex Legends Global Series (ALGS) is a global competitive esports tournament series for the video game Apex Legends run by Electronic Arts and Respawn Entertainment. The series uses a promotion and relegation system throughout each season, culminating in the ALGS Championship. The ALGS was announced in 2019, with its inaugural season taking place in 2020–21.

== Format ==
As of the 2021–22 season, the ALGS season format consists three phases: Split One, Split Two, and the ALGS Championship. Each split consists of a regular season, called the Pro League, and playoffs.

Each split consists of a regional Pro League regular season in each of its five regions: North America, EMEA, APAC South, APAC North, and South America. A total of 30 teams in each region compete in their region's Pro League, with teams coming from online qualifiers and direct invites based on previous performance. A total of 40 teams from the Pro Leagues then advance to the split playoffs. (Note: Although initially planned to include the top 40 teams from all regions, the Split One Playoffs featured five separate regional online tournaments, consisting of the top 20 teams from each region's Pro League Split One regular season.) After the conclusion of the Split Two playoffs, the top performing teams from playoffs, along with teams that advance through "Last Chance Qualifier tournaments", advance to the ALGS Championship match.

== History ==
=== Inaugural season ===
In December 2019, Electronic Arts (EA) and Respawn Entertainment announced the first Apex Legends Global Series. The series was split up into total of 22 events over four phases, and each phase culminated in Major Events, the series' top-level events; the last Major of season, called the Apex Legends Global Series Championship, would determine the winner of the season. The first event of the season began in January 2020. The first online qualifiers was marred by game crashes disconnecting players from the server, as well as bugs within the game itself. On March 6, the first major was indefinitely postponed due to the COVID-19 pandemic. On March 31, the season shifted to a completely online format and introduced a tournament structure change that included the introduction of new tournaments. The ALGS Championship was divided into five separate championship matches by region — North America (NA), South America (SA), Europe, Middle East, and Africa (EMEA), Asia-Pacific North (APAC North), and Asia-Pacific South (APAC South). The prize pool for the ALGS Championship was US$2.58 million, with $1 million initially contributed by EA, while rest came from sales of limited edition in-game skins. The ALGS Championship began on June 1, and the five regional champions of the season were Kungarna NA (North America), Paradox Esports (South America), Scarz Europe (EMEA), Fennel Korea (APAC North), and Wolfpack Arctic (APAC South).

=== 2021–22 season ===
For the second season of ALGS, the total prize pool was increased to $5 million. EA and Respawn shifted the series to a different format and expanded it to allow Xbox and PlayStation players to compete. Viewership for the second season began slow, with an average viewership of less than 10,000 in North America and EMEA, the two most popular regions, throughout the regular season of first split. The Split One Playoffs saw a significant increase in viewership, peaking at over 300,000 viewers and averaging 55,000 — nearly the same viewership as the inaugural season ALGS Championship. With an average minute audience of over 539,000 and 10.3 million total hours watched, the Split Two Playoffs on May 1, 2022, broke viewership records across all of EA's titles. The ALGS Championship was held at the PNC Arena in Raleigh, North Carolina on July 7–10. Unlike the previous season, there was only one championship match, with teams from all regions competing. The event had a $2 million prize pool, and it marked the first time that the ALGS held a live-audience event. Australian team DarkZero Esports won the series' second season.

=== 2022–23 season ===
For the third season, the prize pool stayed the same as before at $5 million. The online regular season for Split 1 of the ALGS Year 3 Pro League began on November 6, 2022. Although Split 1 dropped in viewership by 30%, it peaked at over 500,000 viewers during the playoffs across multiple channels on both Twitch.tv and YouTube. This Split was held at Copper Box Arena in London and introduced a new fast-paced format for the finals called Match Point. In this format, a team can only be crowned the victor once they win a game after they have already garnered 50 points. Team SoloMid (TSM) ultimately won the Split 1 Playoffs and took home $300,000 and their in-game-leader ImperialHal winning MVP of the tournament.

=== 2023–25 season ===
The ALGS Year 4 Pro League North American Regional Finals were postponed after multiple competitors experienced hacking incidents where they were given cheats mid-match, including auto-aim and revealing the location of every player in the game. Easy Anti-Cheat, the anti-cheat software used for Apex Legends, issued a statement on March 18 stating that they were confident the issue did not resolve from a vulnerability within their software.

After the Year 4 Split 2 LAN tournament, EA announced the "BLGS", a series of online open tournaments taking place between the Split 2 LAN and the season's ALGS Championship tournament.

The ALGS Championship was held in February 2025 at the Daiwa House Premist Dome in Sapporo, Japan. The Greek esports organization GoNext won the championship LAN, its core formerly part of 2R1C and Blacklist International.

=== 2025−26 season ===
ALGS Year 5 was the first season to introduce a Legend BAN system, where all legends would be available at the start of a series, and after each match, the most picked legend would be removed from the pool of available legends for the remainder of the series. Additionally, a Point-of-Interest (POI) drafting system for matches was introduced alongside the Legend BAN system, North America & South America were combined to form a single Americas region, and it was announced there would be no Split 2 Playoffs LAN for Year 5.

ALGS Year 5 experienced a schedule change to accommodate a new ALGS Open featuring 160 teams, a prize pool of $1 million, no group stage, and a double-elimination format. The 2025 ALGS Open was hosted at the Morial Convention Center in New Orleans, Louisiana from May 1-4, 2025 and won by Team Falcons.

Following the start of Split 1, the Midseason Playoffs were announced to be part of the 2025 Esports World Cup in Ridyah, Saudi Arabia, with a prize pool of $2 million. The announcement sparked controversy due to concerns over human rights abuses by the Saudi monarchy, leading to accusations of sportswashing and at least one player boycotting the tournament. The Chinese esports organization VK Gaming won the 2025 ALGS Midseason Playoffs.

The ALGS Year 5 Championship was held again in the Sapporo Dome in Sapporo, Japan from January 15-18, 2026.. Oblivion, an unsigned Team won, the first time this has happened in the ALGS Championships. Additionally, the team's coach became the first woman to win an ALGS Championship.

=== Future seasons ===
The ALGS Year 6 Championship is scheduled to take place at the same location in 2027.

== List of winners ==
#	Year	Split 1 Playoffs	Split 2 Playoffs	Championship	References
1	2020–21	—N/a		multiple teams (Note: Due to the COVID-19 pandemic, five regional champions were crowned instead: Fennel Korea (APAC North), Wolfpack Arctic (APAC South), Scarz (EMEA), Kungarna NA (NA), Paradox (SA))	
2	2021–22	multiple teams (Note: Due to the COVID-19 pandemic, five regional champions were crowned instead: Riddle (APAC North), DreamFire (APAC South), NEW Esports (EMEA), TSM (NA), Team Singularity (SA).)	Reignite	DarkZero	
3	2022–23	TSM	DarkZero	TSM	
4	2023–24 (Note: The ALGS Championship for Year 4 was held in 2025.)	Reject Winnity	Spacestation Gaming	GoNext	
5	2025–26	Team Falcons (Note: The ALGS Open was held in place of the Split 1 Playoffs for Year 5.)	VK Gaming (Note: The Midseason Playoffs, held as part of the 2025 Esports World Cup, was held in place of the Split 2 Playoffs for Year 5.)	Oblivion	
6	2026-27	Unlimit (Note: Held as part of the 2026 Esports World Cup.)	Team Liquid		
