= TSM (esports) =

American esports organization

- Founded: 2009
- Based in: Los Angeles, California
- Location: United States
- Colors: Black, white
- CEO: Andy "Reginald" Dinh
- Divisions: Super Smash Bros.; Marvel Rivals; Halo Infinite
- Partners: Jersey Mike's Subs; Twitch; Zenni Optical
- Website: tsm.gg

TSM (initialism derived from the previous name Team SoloMid) is a professional esports organization based in the United States. It was co-founded in September 2009 by the brothers Andy "Reginald" Dinh and Dan Dinh. TSM currently fields players in Super Smash Bros., Halo Infinite, and Marvel Rivals.

TSM's League of Legends team won seven splits of North America's League of Legends Championship Series (LCS).

== History ==
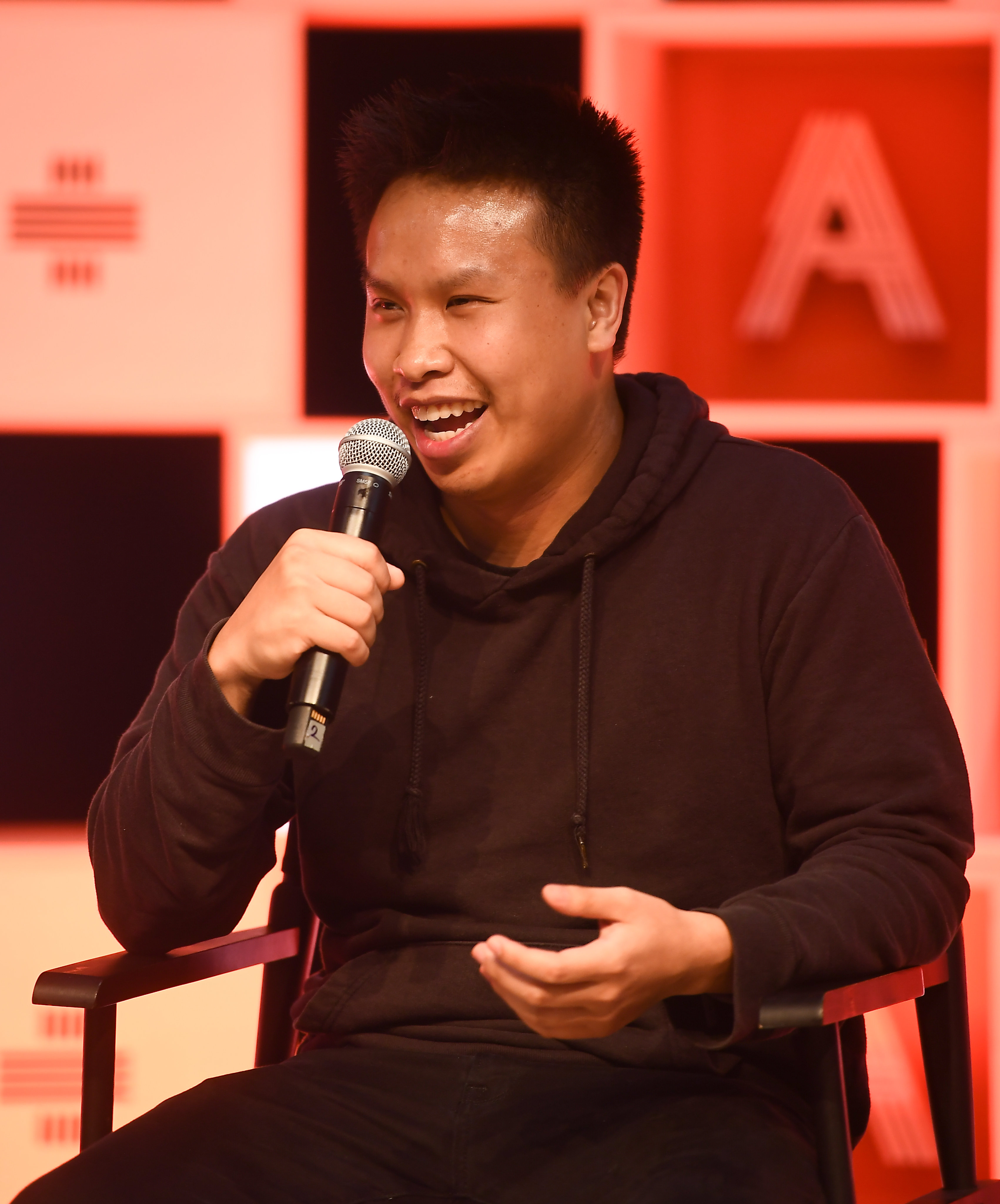
Founder Andy "Reginald" Dinh

Before entering esports, the origin of Team SoloMid (TSM) traces back to September 2009, when Andy "Reginald" Dinh and his brother Dan Dinh created a blog, which became SoloMid.net, during their college years providing written guides for the game League of Legends. The Dinh brothers were both part of a League of Legends clan called All or Nothing during the game's beta testing, which later rebranded to SoloMid. A small group of players that represented the SoloMid.net community would become the original TSM team: SaintVicious, Chaox, TheOddOne, Locodoco, and Reginald. Team SoloMid was officially created in January 2011. Later that year, Riot Games launched the first season of what would become the League Championship Series. By then, both SaintVicious and Locodoco had left the team, and TheRainMan and Xpecial had replaced them to complete TSM's roster of the first season. The same year, Jack Etienne had become the general manager for the team.

In 2013, Reginald left the team to run the TSM business full time.

In 2014, TSM expanded into Hearthstone esports by signing MaSsan, Trump, and Kripparrian. The organization expanded into two more esports titles in 2015, acquiring the Counter-Strike: Global Offensive (CS:GO) roster of Team Dignitas and its first Super Smash Bros. player, Leffen. TSM found success across multiple titles that year. Their League of Legends team won the Intel Extreme Masters World Championship for the first time, and their CS:GO division won multiple international tournaments as well. However, despite their successes, TSM dropped their CS:GO team completely by the end of the year.

In March 2016, they established their Vainglory division after acquiring the team Alliance. Later that year, in late July, Team SoloMid signed an Overwatch team. However, two weeks later, it dropped the team after allegations arose in regards to some of its players cheating in CS:GO. In September 2016, TSM, along with six other North American esports organizations, established the Professional Esports Association (PEA), a Counter-Strike: Global Offensive league.

In May 2017, TSM had also established a division in PlayerUnknown's Battlegrounds.

On June 16, 2019, TSM acquired the former roster of the Rainbow Six: Siege Pro League team Excelerate Gaming along with popular streamer, Jason "Beaulo" Doty. They started competition in the Pro League in Season 10, on the same day.

By July 2020, TSM had teams competing across 10 games. They also fielded two simultaneous rosters in three of them: Fortnite, Apex Legends, and PlayerUnknown's Battlegrounds. The first roster was one that competes in tournaments to win, while the second one was more akin to typical streamers who typically create collaborative content within a shared gaming house.

On May 22, 2020, TSM announced their move into the Valorant scene, with their first official roster consisting of Hazed, Drone, Wardell, Cutler, and Subroza. According to Subroza, the transition for most players on the team was easy coming from a CSGO background.

On August 27, 2020, TSM announced their signing of chess Grandmaster Hikaru Nakamura. Nakamura is the second chess player to be sponsored by an esports organization.

In December 2020, Team SoloMid was worth $410 million. The same month the revenue of Team SoloMid was estimated $45 million.

On June 4, 2021, TSM announced a 10-year $210 million naming rights deal with Bahamas-based cryptocurrency exchange FTX, officially changing their name to Team SoloMid FTX. Also in June 2021, Erik Marino, co-founder of the brand Rocksmith, joined TSM as vice president of apparel.

On January 26, 2022, TSM announced on their Twitter page that they will acquire Team Undying's roster and will venture into the DotA 2 scene. Team Undying consisted of Timado, Bryle, SabeRLight-, MoonMeander and DuBu, and currently competing in the NA region. They won the Dota Pro Circuit NA 2021/2022 Tour 1 Regional finals against Evil Geniuses.

In late 2021, several employees and players of TSM publicly accused Reginald of workplace bullying, including verbal abuse; similar accusations had arisen as early as 2011. TSM and Riot Games, the game developer of League of Legends, both launched their own investigations into the accusations as a result. Following its investigation, Riot Games determined that Dinh had engaged in a pattern of disparaging and bullying behavior. TSM was fined $75,000, with Dinh being ordered to complete sensitivity and executive training. TSM meanwhile found that their CEO had committed "no unlawful conduct".

On November 16, 2022, TSM announced they had dropped the "FTX" branding and ended their agreement with FTX early after FTX declared bankruptcy amid scandal.

On May 6, 2024, the Esports World Cup Foundation, funded by the Saudi Arabia Public Investment Fund and organizers of the Esports World Cup tournament series, announced the 30 organizations (known in the ESWC as Clubs) who would make up the Club Support Program, with TSM being one of them. This program gives teams a one-time six-figure stipend if an organization is willing to enter new esports as well as additional funding each year if they drive viewership and fan engagement to the Esports World Cup.

== Current divisions ==
=== Super Smash Bros. ===
In April 2015, TSM signed Super Smash Bros. Melee player Leffen as their first fighting game player.

On August 1, 2015, TSM announced the signing of ZeRo to their Super Smash Bros. division. ZeRo would go on to achieve 56 straight tournament wins in Super Smash Bros. for Wii U, a feat recorded in the Guinness World Records. On January 12, 2018, ZeRo announced his retirement from the Super Smash Bros. competitive scene due to his lack of motivation to go further with his career, and on November 8, 2018, TSM announced that ZeRo had departed from the team.

In August 2018, Leffen won Evo 2018, defeating Armada 3–0 in the grand finals to claim the trophy.

Gavin "Tweek" Dempsey also joined TSM in 2019. Tweek has won multiple majors and supermajors including Smash Ultimate Summit 3 and Let's Make Big Moves 2023. Tweek parted ways with TSM on February 28, 2023. On November 7th, 2025, he rejoined TSM.

=== Halo Infinite ===
On January 31, 2025 Team SoloMid announced through various social media that they had signed a Halo Infinite roster. The roster consisted of the players Roman "Druk" Nasirudin, Hunter "Taulek" Davis, Michael "SoulSnipe" Girgis, and Youssef "Cherished" Shaaban with coach Trey "Trey". Additionally TSM officially partnered with the Halo Championship Series (HCS) for Year 4 of Halo Infinite professional competition taking place during 2025. After a disappointing finish at HCS Arlington 2025, on May 2, 2025, TSM dropped "Cherished" and replaced him with Emmanuel "Manny" Lombert to complete their roster. At the conclusion of Year 4 of competition TSM subsequently dropped this roster.

On October 13, 2026 TSM announced they were returning to Halo Infinite professional competition with a roster of Hunter "Taulek" Davis, Joey "Trippy" Taylor, Kaci "Lqgend" Sabri, Paul "Snakebite" Duarte, and coach Trey "Trey".

== Former divisions ==
=== Rocket League ===
Team SoloMid returned to Rocket League with the acquisition of the Hey Bro team on January 24, 2024, after they had released their roster back on April 11, 2020. The roster consisted of Gwil "creamz" Muir, Stephen "hockE" Hoelbinger and Dylan "Wahvey" Thanus. They competed as part of the North American (NA) region in RLCS.

On October 28, 2026 the entire TSM roster was acquired by Wolves Esports.

=== PUBG: Battlegrounds ===
On May 9, 2024, as part of TSM's announcement video stating that they were one of the members of the Esports World Cup Foundation Club Support Program (funded by the Saudi Arabia Public Investment Fund), the organization announced its return to PUBG: Battlegrounds by signing the Shoot To Kill roster, who qualified for the PUBG Global Series for seasons 3 and 4. TSM had previously been involved in PUBG: Battlegrounds esports from 2017, when the game was known as PlayerUnknown's Battlegrounds, to 2022, including rosters in Europe and North America (TSM's NA core who were released when they first left Battlegrounds would end up forming Shoot To Kill).

On January 15, 2025, TSM announced they were parting ways with their PUBG roster.

=== Overwatch ===
Team SoloMid acquired an Overwatch team on July 22, 2016. The original team consisted of Jake "torkTJO" Lepoff, Nicolas "NicolasTJO" Aubin, Joey "jkw" Wavering, Joe "Joemeister" Gramano, Jackson "Shake" Kaplan, and Anthony "harbleu" Ballo. On August 8, 2016, the whole TSM squad transferred to compLexity Gaming. Team SoloMid lost on Overwatch Open Tournament and BTS Overwatch Cup in 2016, and dropped their roster and Overwatch altogether on May 5, 2017.

In May 2024, TSM returned to Overwatch esports for the North American FACEIT League, signing seven players, three coaches, and two analysts, which were part of Timeless before the organization left Overwatch.

In October 2024, TSM announced they were parting ways with their Overwatch roster.

=== Call of Duty ===
Team SoloMid acquired a team to compete at 2016 CoD: World League in February 2016. The team, which took less than 2 weeks to assemble, consisted of Cole "ColeChan" Chancey, Jonathan "Pacman" Tucker, Jordan "ProoFy" Cannon, and Jamal "Whea7s" Lee. On July 7, 2016, TSM announced their withdrawal from CoD, and that the team would be going separate ways. This is due to the team's performance in the World League Stage 2. The team finished near the bottom of their rankings.

=== League of Legends ===
The League of Legends division of TSM was officially established in January 2011. The team's early roster consisted of players Saintvicious, Chaox, TheOddOne, Locodoco, and Reginald himself. They participated in the Season One World Championship later that year, securing a third place finish. In the years that followed, TSM continued to evolve, making roster changes and competing in various tournaments and leagues. They won the 2011 MLG Providence League of Legends tournament and achieved success in several other events. In the Season Two World Championship, Team SoloMid reached to the quarterfinals. TSM's fortunes fluctuated in the subsequent years, but in 2013, they became the inaugural North American League of Legends Championship Series (NA LCS) champions. They maintained their status as a top team in North America, with appearances in multiple World Championships. In late 2013, TSM signed Danish mid laner Søren "Bjergsen" Bjerg. While they struggled to make significant progress in international events, TSM remained dominant in North America, securing multiple NA LCS titles during this period. In 2018, TSM went through a rebuilding phase with roster changes but encountered challenges. They missed the World Championship for two consecutive years, in 2018 and 2019. In 2020, TSM experienced a resurgence, winning their seventh LCS title. However, their performance at the 2020 World Championship was underwhelming as they failed to advance from the group stage. The organization saw a major overhaul in 2021, with a new roster and Bjergsen transitioning from player to head coach. Subsequent years brought more roster changes and adjustments, but TSM struggled. They went through multiple head coaches, including Bjergsen, and tried various players in different roles. In 2023, TSM decided to exit the LCS and sold their franchise slot.

=== PUBG Mobile / BGMI ===
Team SoloMid announced on March 6, 2020, that it had entered the Indian esports scene by partnering with the Indian PUBG Mobile team, Entity Gaming. Entity, which won the 2019 PUBG Mobile Club Open (PMCO) Asia Fall and later placed fifth in the global finals, was renamed TSM Entity (TSMxENT) following the partnership announcement.

TSM officially released this lineup on July 22, 2021, ending their partnership with Entity Gaming in the Indian region.

Team SoloMid signed the former PUBG Mobile Roster of Stalwart Esports on July 30, 2021, as their Battlegrounds Mobile India (Indian version of PUBG Mobile) roster.

=== Tom Clancy's Rainbow Six Siege ===
Team SoloMid acquired a Rainbow Six Siege team on June 16, 2019, the day before the beginning of Pro League Season 10. The original roster consisted of Matthew "Achieved" Solomon, Khalil "b1ologic" Pleas, Jason "Beaulo" Doty, Tommy "Krusher" Samuel, Bryan "Merc" Wrzek, and Owen "Pojoman" Matura as coach. In early July, it was announced would compete in Dreamhack Valencia 2019 where they would defeat Team Reciprocity and Team One Esports while being eliminated by top European team, Looking For Org, in the quarter finals. From the middle of July to August, Pojoman played in place of Krusher citing confidence issues from the latter. With Pojoman playing, TSM qualified for the Six Major Raleigh 2019 through the North American online qualifier and placed 5–8th in the main event, defeating MiBR and PET Nora-Rengo losing only to Team Empire, the eventual champions, and G2 Esports, the world champions.

On August 24, less than a week after the Major, b1ologic stepped down from the team for personal reasons. To replace him and Krusher, Pojoman moved to a player role and his former teammate from SK Gaming and DarkZero Esports, Sam "Jarvis" Jarvis joined. To replace Pojoman as a player, the former coach of Evil Geniuses, Aaron "Gotcha" Chung joined. This new roster would compete in Dreamhack Montreal 2019 on September 6–8. In Dreamack Montreal, TSM defeated both top Brazilian team FaZe Clan and mixed American-European Susquehanna Soniqs during the group stage. In the playoffs, TSM defeated fellow North Americans, Rogue, top French team BDS Esport, and another top Brazilian team of Team Liquid during the grand final. This victory guaranteed a place in the Six Invitational 2020, the Rainbow Six Siege world championship. In North American Pro League Season 10, TSM placed 6th, narrowly avoiding relegation after defeating top teams such as Rogue and Spacestation Gaming.

On November 25, Gotcha returned to Evil Geniuses as a player, and Jarvis was replaced by another member of EG, Emilio Leynez "Geometrics" Cuevas. At the 2020 Six Invitational (SI), TSM came 3rd losing 0:2 to Ninjas In Pyjamas in the Lower Bracket Finals.

On June 3, Pojoman stepped down as a player to become the team's new head coach, being replaced by Brady "Chala" Davenport on July 27, who transferred from SpaceStation Gaming. Due to the 2020 COVID-19 pandemic, the Six November 2020 Major was cancelled and was divided into separate regional events. North America was one such region which TSM played and came 1st, beating SpaceStation Gaming 3:1 in the Grand Finals. Following this regional major win, the team achieved another 1st, beating DarkZero 3:1 in the NAL 2020 US Division finals, ahead of 2021 SI. On May 11, the 2021 Six Invitational took place in Paris where TSM took 1st place in the group state, but were knocked out of the tournament by Team Liquid in the Lower Bracket Semi-final, earning them 4th place.

For the rest of 2021, TSM results were lackluster, coming 2nd, 13th–15th, and 5th in their next three tournaments. This meant in order to compete in the 2022 Six Invitational world championship, they had to win the North American Closed Qualifiers, which they did, beating Parabellum Esports 3:0 in the Grand Final. On February 8 in Stockholm Sweden, the 2022 SI group stage started, with TSM coming 3rd in group C, granting them a place in the playoffs with their first match against Ninjas in Pyjamas, the team that beat them in 2020 SI. This time TSM won 2:0 and they continued to win until the Upper Bracket Final against Team Empire, where they lost 1:2. This meant they had to win the Lower Brack Final against FaZe Clan to rematch Team Empire in the Grand Finals, which they did 2:0. After going through the North American Qualifiers to earn a place in the 2022 Six Invitational, fighting through the group stage and the playoffs, then losing in the upper bracket final, only to regain their place after a win in the lower bracket final, TSM rematch Team Empire in the Grand Finals for the 1st place prize of $1,000,000. After 4 games, 54 rounds, and 3 overtimes, TSM win the 2022 Six Invitational 3:1.

=== Vainglory ===
Team SoloMid acquired Team Alliance's Vainglory roster on March 10, 2016. The team, upon acquisition, was composed of Michael "FlashX" Valore, Nick "CullTheMeek" Verolla and Mico "MICSHE" Dedicatoria. During their run as Team Alliance, they had won the Vainglory International Premier League, with substitute ShinKaigan filling in for iLoveJoseph, an original Team Alliance member, due to school conflicts.

Team SoloMid has won two of the past three championships since being acquired. During the 2016 Vainglory Summer Live Championships, Team SoloMid went 9–0 throughout the event, beating runner-up Hammers Velocity with a 3–0 score.

On July 19, 2018, TSM announced that it had disbanded their Vainglory division.

=== Counter-Strike 2 ===
TSM acquired a Danish squad in January 2015. On December 3 TSM announced the roster had been released, citing internal problems. The ex-TSM team first played under the name "Team Question Mark" until founding their own organization, Astralis. Astralis would go on to win four Majors, ELEAGUE Major Atlanta 2017 FACEIT Major London 2018, IEM Katowice 2019 Major, and StarLadder Major Berlin 2019. TSM announced a new North American roster on January 19, 2016. On March 8, 2016, TSM revealed the departure of Daniel "vice" Kim. On January 14, 2017, TSM announced the departure of their entire CS:GO roster.

On August 29, 2023, TSM announced a new CSGO roster consisting of Audric "JACKZ" Jug, former ENCE player Valdemar "valde" Bjørn Vangså, former Cloud9 player Timofey "interz" Yakushin, Cai "CYPHER" Watson and Mădălin-Andrei "MoDo" Mirea. Former G2 and Vitality coach Rémy "XTQZZZ" Quoniam and Lambert Prigent became the team's head coach and assistant coach respectively.

After only just over a month with the organisation, on October 7, TSM released XTQZZZ.

By the end of 2024, TSM benched their whole Counter-Strike lineup and have yet to field a new roster, effectively exiting Counter-Strike esports.

=== Valorant ===
Team SoloMid acquired a Valorant team on May 22, 2020. The roster consists of Matthew "WARDELL" Yu, Yassin "Subroza" Taoufik, James "hazed" Cobb, Taylor "drone" Johnson, and Stephen "reltuC" Cutler. All of these players retired from CS:GO to compete in TSM's Valorant roster. TSM also added Braxton "brax" Pierce to their Valorant roster at the end of March 2021 and released him before July as returned to T1. The organization benched Cutler for Sean "bang" Bezerra on June 29, 2021.

The TSM roster had a strong start in the Valorant competitive scene, gaining the top 3 places in many of the Invitational Series and Cups hosted by other teams. TSM also claimed second place in First Strike North America with a defeat against 100 Thieves. As the new year progressed, the team started in a decline from their 2020 explosive start, not making the regional finals of Masters 1 and then not making it to Masters 2 which could've gotten them a place in Valorant's first International LAN event. After some roster changes for the beginning of Stage 3 Challengers 1, TSM looked progressively better, but was beaten by Noble, a disbanded team which they will acquire future teammate Aleko "LeviathanAG" Gabuniya. In Challengers 2, TSM rode through with close games to win the tournament and qualify for Challenger Playoffs. However, they did not make it to the second LAN event in Berlin and ended placing in the bottom 2 of 8 teams. It was then unable to go to the Last Chance Qualifiers to qualify for Champions since an NA team didn't win Valorant's Berlin LAN event, as it is finished 11th in the North American circuit point standings. In 2022, TSM rode had a tumultuous beginning, after falling in the Open Qualifier #1 to Akrew after their dramatic forfeit win over T1 after the "help sewers" incident. Later, TSM went into the 2nd Open Qualifier, falling even earlier, as they lost to Built by Gamers, ending their Stage 1 Challengers run. However, they were able to prove themselves as a great squad coming into Stage 2, as they were able to beat every team except Faze Clan to earn a spot into Stage 2 Challengers. Once they got to the main group stage though, they ended up with a 1–4 record with their only win coming against 100 Thieves, ending their 2022 Valorant season as they didn't have enough points for the Last Chance Qualifier. Coming into the 2023 season, with a new squad of Corey, NaturE, seven, gMd, and Hazed, TSM looked like a favorite in the new format of Valorant eSports. Looking to get to Valorant Ascension and get a franchised spot, they were easily one of the contenders, as they were immediately invited to the Valorant Challengers League for North America. They made a statement in the first split, winning 4 of their 5 games, with their only loss coming to M80. They did make a change mid-split, swapping in Kanpeki for Hazed for week 3, and won 3 in a row after that. However, their strong split came to a screeching halt in the Mid-Season Face Off, as they lost to Moist Moguls in the first round, before losing to Oxygen Esports to end their run as the 5th–6th place team. Going into Split 2, with the exact same team, TSM looked to be a heavy-hitter again, by beating Shopify Rebellion in the first week, but later lost 3 of their 4 final games after that. Similar to Split 2, their run in playoffs to make ascension was also very grim, as they lost both matches to Moist Moguls and Faze Clan, ending their season. After that, TSM announced that they would drop their entire team and coaches amid the long uncertain off-season.

TSM announced their exit from Valorant esports in November 2025.

== Rosters ==
TSM rosters

Marvel Rivals
Handle	Name	Nationality
bedtimestory	-, -	United States
cal	Mazzucco, Matteo	Canada
Dinks	Hernandez, Kevin	United States
False	Wiseman, Nick	Canada
Gale	-, -	United States
Gleeful	-, -	United States
Guru	Koppes, Zechariah	United States
Mirror	Trịnh, Huy-Chris	Vietnam

Super Smash Bros.
Handle	Name	Nationality
Leffen	Hjelte, William	Sweden
Tweek	Dempsey, Gavin	United States

Halo Infinite
Handle	Name	Nationality
Lqgend	Sabri, Kaci	France
Snakebite	Duarte, Paul	United States
Taulek	Davis, Hunter	United States
Trippy	Taylor, Joey	United States

Legend:
- (I) Inactive
- (S) Suspended
- (L) On loan
- (2W) Two-way player
- Substitute
- (injured) Injury / Illness

Awards and achievements
Preceded by Inaugural; Cloud9; Counter Logic Gaming; Cloud9	League Championship Series winner (7 titles); Spring 2013; Summer 2014 – Spring 2015; Summer 2016 – Summer 2017; Summer 2020	Succeeded by Cloud9; Counter Logic Gaming; Team Liquid; Cloud9
Preceded by KT Rolster Bullets	Intel Extreme Masters World Championship winner Season IX (2015)	Succeeded by SK Telecom T1
Preceded by Ninjas in Pyjamas	Six Invitational winner 2022	Succeeded by G2 Esports
