= List of Apex Legends characters =

Playable characters in the video game Apex Legends

The then-current roster of 23 playable Legends in official anniversary artwork released in 2023.

The 2019 battle royale hero shooter Apex Legends, developed by Respawn Entertainment and published by Electronic Arts, features an ensemble of playable characters known as "Legends". The game is set in the same science fiction universe as Respawn's Titanfall series, and characters, technology and concepts from that series have been incorporated into Apex Legends.

The game launched with eight playable Legends and has expanded its roster through seasonal updates. Each character has a set of distinct abilities and is assigned to one of five gameplay classes: Assault, Skirmisher, Recon, Controller and Support. The cast has received particular critical and academic attention for its representation of different racial, cultural, gender and sexual identities.

== Development ==
When Apex Legends launched in February 2019, its playable roster consisted of Bangalore, Bloodhound, Caustic, Gibraltar, Lifeline, Mirage, Pathfinder and Wraith.

Respawn has described Apex Legends as more character-focused than Titanfall. Lead writer Ashley Reed said that whereas Titanfall was structured around a war and characters who often appeared only briefly, the Apex Games provided a framework for recurring characters whose relationships could develop over time. Narrative director Manny Hagopian similarly described distinct personalities and perspectives as central to the game's storytelling. Reed and Hagopian said that some relationships were planned in advance while others emerged as the writers developed the roster.

Several of the launch characters underwent substantial iteration. Narrative lead Mohammad Alavi and designer Griffin Dean said that Wraith was redesigned repeatedly because a direct adaptation of Titanfall 2's Phase Shift ability proved difficult for opposing players to read in a battle royale. Bangalore was conceived as a comparatively straightforward soldier whose smoke and artillery abilities could help a squad cross exposed areas; elements of her design drew on the Bangalore torpedo, military creeping barrages and the Harlem Hellfighters. Gibraltar was among the earliest characters created and underwent significant visual redesign as Respawn moved away from a uniformly military aesthetic. Octane, the first post-launch Legend, was inspired by Titanfall 2's Stim ability and by players using speed-oriented strategies in the game's Gauntlet time trial.

The relationship with Titanfall continued as the roster expanded. Jordan Ramée of GameSpot identified Wraith, Pathfinder, Bloodhound, Mirage, Octane, Rampart, Gibraltar, Fuse, Valkyrie and Ash as characters whose abilities or equipment adapted ideas associated with Pilots or Titans in Titanfall 2.

Respawn initially introduced a new Legend with each season, but senior character designer Devan McGuire said in 2022 that this cadence could eventually slow because an increasingly large roster made it more difficult to devise characters that were distinctive without becoming excessively powerful or narrowly specialized. A large leak from an unreleased build in March 2022 exposed nine prospective characters and other planned content; several of the leaked concepts, including Newcastle, Vantage and Catalyst, were subsequently introduced in altered forms.

For Axle, introduced in the 2026 Overclocked season, Respawn began development by examining the role of movement throughout the game's competitive and casual metagames. The design team cited the popularity of movement-oriented characters such as Valkyrie and Octane and built Axle around sliding, lateral mobility and displacement rather than simply increasing movement speed.

== Assault ==
Assault Legends are characters whose abilities are primarily designed for direct combat.

=== Ballistic ===
August Montgomery Brinkman, known as Ballistic, is a former competitor in the Thunderdome, a predecessor to the Apex Games. After the death of his brother-in-law and teammate Kit Siang, Brinkman withdrew from competition and became estranged from his family. He returns to competition when his son Nathaniel attempts to enter the Apex Games, taking his place in an effort to keep him out. Ballistic is characterized as a weapons specialist whose abilities revolve around carrying and enhancing firearms and disrupting those used by opponents.

=== Bangalore ===
Anita Williams, known as Bangalore, is a former soldier of the Interstellar Manufacturing Corporation (IMC) and the sister of Newcastle. She becomes separated from her family following the Battle of Gridiron and later competes in the Apex Games. Her soldier-oriented abilities use smoke, artillery and increased mobility under fire.

Bangalore has received attention for her depiction as a Black woman. In a 2023 Allure feature about Black representation in video games, voice actor Erica Luttrell highlighted the character's natural hairstyle as an uncommon form of representation for Black women in games. Former Respawn senior producer Tim Lewinson attributed the diversity of the launch roster in part to an early development philosophy that the game's cast should reflect the diversity of its audience.

=== Fuse ===
Walter Fitzroy, known as Fuse, is an explosives enthusiast from the planet Salvo and a childhood friend and later rival of Mad Maggie. After Salvo joins the Syndicate that operates the Apex Games, he leaves the planet to become a competitor. His abilities emphasize grenades, explosives and area denial.

Following Fuse's announcement in 2021, independent developer NOWWA alleged that his visual design resembled Hunter, a character from its then-unreleased game BulletVille, citing similarities in their clothing, facial hair, accessories and technological eyepieces. PocketGamer.biz noted that BulletVille was reviewed while under consideration for the EA Originals program, but also reported that Fuse may already have been in development by that time; NOWWA did not accuse the EA Originals team of acting in bad faith.

=== Mad Maggie ===
Margaret Kōhere, known as Mad Maggie, is a Māori freedom fighter from Salvo and Fuse's childhood friend and rival. She opposes Salvo's integration into the Syndicate and is eventually forced to compete in the Apex Games. Her gameplay encourages close-range aggression through abilities associated with shotguns, a riot drill and a large wrecking ball.

Respawn developed Maggie with Māori cultural consultants. Primary writer Sam Gill worked with Vincent Egan and Māori creatives from Maui Studios on her use of te reo Māori, visual markings, clothing and other cultural elements. A haka created for the character was written specifically for the game rather than adapting an existing traditional haka. Voice actor Nicola Kāwana was also involved in reviewing the character's extensive dialogue to refine its dialect and cultural context. The developers said they sought to depict Maggie as a specific Māori woman rather than rely on a generalized "warrior" stereotype.

=== Revenant ===
Revenant is the robotic form of Kaleb Cross, an assassin whose consciousness was transferred into a succession of artificial bodies after his death. He eventually learns the truth about his existence and turns against the organizations responsible for creating him. Revenant enters the Apex Games after killing Forge, a prospective competitor sponsored by Hammond Robotics.

Forge was itself part of a deliberate misdirection by Respawn. The studio announced him as an upcoming playable character and placed misleading character material in the game's files to frustrate dataminers before revealing Revenant instead.

== Skirmisher ==
Skirmisher Legends are primarily oriented around mobility and evasion.

=== Alter ===
Alter is an interdimensional traveler introduced in 2024. She gives conflicting accounts of her past, and the character's unreliability is a deliberate part of her characterization. Her abilities allow her to interact with objects at a distance and create passages through otherwise solid surfaces.

Designer Ian Holstead told GameSpot that permitting a playable character to move through walls posed significant technical problems because the game's existing maps had not been constructed with such an ability in mind. Respawn developed additional testing tools and technology to accommodate her portals. Narrative designer Jaclyn Seto said that Alter was conceived as a more playful form of villain than characters such as Revenant and Ash. Seto also described Alter as the game's first playable character of Chinese descent; Cantonese dialogue and culturally influenced cosmetic elements were incorporated into her characterization.

=== Ash ===
Ash was formerly Dr. Ashleigh Reid, a scientist involved in Project Iris with Horizon before being critically injured and having her consciousness transferred to a robotic simulacrum body. She first appeared as an antagonist in Titanfall 2 before becoming playable in Apex Legends. Her abilities emphasize pursuit and repositioning, including the use of phase technology associated with the earlier games.

=== Axle ===
Axle is a combat racer introduced in the 2026 Overclocked season. She is built around maintaining momentum through sliding and repositioning both herself and other combatants. Respawn described her as the product of a broader examination of movement in Apex Legends, rather than an attempt simply to create another fast character.

=== Horizon ===
Dr. Mary Somers, known as Horizon, is an astrophysicist and gravitational researcher. During an expedition to obtain the energy source Branthium, she is betrayed by Ash and stranded near a black hole, returning to civilization decades later after considerably less time has passed for her. Her abilities manipulate gravity to move herself and other players through the battlefield.

=== Octane ===
Octavio Silva, known as Octane, is a wealthy daredevil whose pursuit of increasingly dangerous stunts leaves him without his lower legs. His prosthetic legs and stimulant-based abilities support a highly mobile style of play, while his launch pad can reposition other members of his squad. Respawn based the character in part on the speed-oriented play of Titanfall 2 and its Stim ability.

=== Pathfinder ===
Pathfinder is a highly optimistic MRVN robot who travels the Outlands seeking information about his creators and purpose. His movement is built around a grappling hook and ziplines, allowing both Pathfinder and his teammates to traverse terrain quickly.

=== Wraith ===
Renee Blasey, known as Wraith, is a former IMC science pilot who lost much of her memory after being subjected to experiments involving phase technology. She is able to hear alternate versions of herself and move temporarily through the Void, abilities she uses while investigating her past.

Joshua Rivera of Kotaku identified the ambiguity surrounding Wraith and Bloodhound as one of the game's more effective early mysteries, particularly because details in their costumes invited speculation about their relationship to the Pilot technology of Titanfall without providing definitive answers.

== Recon ==
Recon Legends specialize in locating opponents and gathering information about enemy squads.

=== Bloodhound ===
Bloodhound is a non-binary hunter who combines advanced tracking technology with the traditional beliefs taught to them by their uncle Artur. Their abilities reveal the movements and positions of opposing players.

At launch, Bloodhound was identified as non-binary and uses they/them pronouns. Their deliberately incomplete history also became a subject of early fan and critical speculation about possible connections to the Pilots of Titanfall.

=== Crypto ===
Tae Joon Park, known as Crypto, is a hacker who goes into hiding after uncovering evidence that the Syndicate was manipulating the Apex Games and being framed for a crime. He subsequently enters the competition under an assumed identity. His abilities center on a remotely controlled surveillance drone that can locate opponents and disrupt electronic equipment.

=== Seer ===
Obi Edolasim, known as Seer, is a performer who was regarded as an ill omen by parts of his community because of the circumstances surrounding his birth. He builds a following through combat and performance before entering the Apex Games. His abilities use micro-drones and heartbeat sensing to locate and interrupt opponents.

=== Sparrow ===
Enea Davide Guarino, known as Sparrow, comes from the Clessidra Rossa, a prominent bounty-hunting organization. His combat style combines archery with tracking technology, including devices that reveal enemies and an electrically charged projectile used to control an area.

=== Valkyrie ===
Kairi Imahara, known as Valkyrie, is the daughter of Viper, an antagonist from Titanfall 2. After confronting Kuben Blisk over her father's death, she enters the Apex Games and uses a jetpack constructed with technology salvaged from Viper's Northstar Titan. Her abilities emphasize aerial movement and reconnaissance.

Valkyrie is a lesbian woman of mixed Japanese and American heritage. Sisi Jiang of Vice praised her characterization for allowing a queer Asian woman to be abrasive, flawed and openly sexual rather than requiring her to function as an idealized representative of either identity. Voice actor Erika Ishii similarly described the character's imperfections as an important part of her appeal.

=== Vantage ===
Xiomara Contreras, known as Vantage, was raised in isolation by her mother after a prison transport crashed on the planet Págos. She enters the Apex Games in an attempt to draw attention to her mother's imprisonment. Accompanied by a bat named Echo, Vantage is designed around long-range reconnaissance and sniper combat.

== Controller ==
Controller Legends emphasize controlling space and securing advantageous positions.

=== Catalyst ===
Tressa Crystal Smith, known as Catalyst, is a defensive character from the planet Boreas who manipulates ferrofluid to reinforce structures, create hazards and obstruct opponents. Introduced in 2022, she was the game's first playable transgender woman. Respawn worked with GLAAD and transgender developers, consultants and voice actor Meli Grant during her development.

=== Caustic ===
Alexander Nox, known as Caustic, is a scientist and fugitive who developed toxic gases through lethal experimentation. He participates in the Apex Games while continuing his research. His abilities use gas traps and clouds to deny areas to opposing players and limit their visibility and movement.

=== Rampart ===
Ramya Parekh, known as Rampart, is a weapons modder and engineer. She enters the Apex Games after her workshop is attacked and destroyed. Her abilities use deployable protective barriers and a custom minigun named Sheila.

=== Wattson ===
Natalie Paquette, known as Wattson, is an electrical engineer who worked with her father on technology used for the Apex Games' containment ring. After his death, she joins the competition herself. Her defensive abilities use electrical fences and a pylon that protects an area from incoming ordnance.

== Support ==
Support Legends are designed primarily around sustaining, protecting or recovering members of their squad.

=== Conduit ===
Rowenna Valentina Coffey Divina, known as Conduit, is a longtime spectator of the Apex Games who enters the competition to provide financial support for her family. She powers an improvised combat exosuit with material recovered from the irradiated battery of a destroyed Monarch Titan. Her abilities provide temporary protection to teammates and create zones that impede opponents.

=== Gibraltar ===
Makoa Gibraltar is a rescue worker and defensive competitor whose abilities use protective shields and an orbital bombardment. Gibraltar was identified as a gay man when the game launched.

=== Lifeline ===
Ajay Che, known as Lifeline, rejected the wealth of her family after learning that its business had profited from armed conflict and instead became associated with humanitarian work. Her gameplay centers on medical support through her D.O.C. drone and the recovery of injured teammates.

Lifeline's portrayal has also prompted criticism over cultural specificity. Alyssa Shotwell of The Mary Sue discussed difficulty among Caribbean players in identifying the real-world accent represented by the character, citing concerns that it blended several Caribbean speech patterns into a generalized caricature. Shotwell argued that the ambiguity demonstrated the difference between including cultural signifiers and representing a particular culture with specificity.

=== Loba ===
Loba Andrade is a thief whose parents were murdered by Revenant when she was a child. She enters the Apex Games while pursuing revenge against him. Her abilities emphasize acquiring equipment for her squad and repositioning through a teleportation bracelet.

=== Mirage ===
Elliott Witt, known as Mirage, is a performer and bartender who specializes in holographic technology developed with his mother. He enters the Apex Games in pursuit of recognition while remaining concerned about leaving his mother alone. His abilities create holographic duplicates that misdirect opponents and conceal some of his actions.

=== Newcastle ===
Jackson Williams, known as Newcastle, is Bangalore's brother and a former IMC pilot who disappeared after deserting with his family. He later assumes the identity and armor of Newcastle in order to protect the community in which he has settled and enters the Apex Games. His abilities emphasize shielding and moving injured teammates.

== Apex Legends Mobile ==
The discontinued mobile spin-off Apex Legends Mobile introduced two playable characters that did not appear as playable Legends in the main game: Fade and Rhapsody. Both were described both as "mobile-first" characters. Apex Legends Mobile was taken offline on May 1, 2023.

=== Fade ===
Ignacio Huamaní, known as Fade, was a mobile-exclusive character whose abilities used phase technology for evasive movement and repositioning.

=== Rhapsody ===
Linh My Vo, known as Rhapsody, was a Vietnamese DJ and hacker accompanied by an artificial-intelligence companion named Rowdy. Her sound-based support abilities were designed both around the fantasy of controlling sound and as a possible response to strategies built around enemy-scanning abilities. Respawn consulted a council of Vietnamese women from the game's community, Vietnamese employees at Electronic Arts and Vietnamese-American voice actor Xanthe Huynh during the character's development.

== Reception ==
The cast of Apex Legends has been widely discussed for its representation. Dante Douglas of The A.V. Club contrasted the launch roster favorably with Overwatch, noting that the game began with two playable Black women, an openly gay man and a non-binary character rather than revealing marginalized identities only after release. A diversity study reported by Newsweek in 2021 identified Apex Legends as the most diverse game in its sample, with its then-current roster evenly divided between female characters and male or non-binary characters and half of the cast classified as Black, Asian or another non-white ethnicity.

Black representation in the roster received particular attention. Gita Jackson of Kotaku wrote shortly after release that the prominence of Lifeline and Bangalore as two playable Black women made the game feel more welcoming to her and distinguished it from games in which Black women were absent or marginal. Rico Norwood of Wired later placed Bangalore and Lifeline within a broader history of Black women in video games and cited them as examples of newer forms of Black womanhood represented by the medium. Game Informer similarly discussed Bangalore, Lifeline and Seer in an article about representations of Blackness in games, emphasizing the differences between their military, medical and Afrofuturist characterization.

The game's LGBTQ characters have also attracted sustained commentary. Claire Lewis of GameSpot argued that Respawn generally avoided reducing the characters to demographic labels by incorporating sexuality, gender and relationships into recurring dialogue and character stories. Emily Berry of Kotaku particularly praised the way the developing relationship among Bangalore, Loba and Valkyrie was expressed through ordinary gameplay dialogue and the game's ping system, rather than being confined to supplemental fiction. Catalyst was nominated for Best LGBTQ Character at the 2023 Gayming Awards; the nomination highlighted GLAAD's involvement in her development and the casting of transgender actor Meli Grant.

Academic writing has treated the roster more cautiously. Gabriela T. Richard cited Apex Legends and Overwatch as examples of popular first-person multiplayer games in which culturally and gender-diverse ensemble casts represented a potentially significant change in video-game representation. She also argued that a first-person perspective can limit the extent to which players actually see the diverse characters they inhabit, complicating the representational effect. Jason Hawreliak and Amélie Lemieux likewise used Apex Legends as one of several examples in a multimodal study of how video games represent race, gender, class and other social-justice issues through visual, procedural and interactive systems.

The distinct gameplay identities of the characters have also been credited with differentiating the game from other battle royales. GamesRadar+ argued that the abilities attached to each Legend materially changed squad strategy rather than functioning merely as cosmetic differences between avatars. In an early ranking of the launch roster, Andy Moore of Paste favored Bangalore and Lifeline for their broadly useful team abilities while placing Caustic last because he considered his area-control abilities comparatively situational. Respawn developers said in 2020 that character popularity varied with seasonal balance changes and game modes, although Wraith and Pathfinder had remained consistently popular and characters such as Caustic, Wattson and Gibraltar performed particularly well in some competitive or limited-time contexts.
