= Spacestation Gaming =

Esports organization

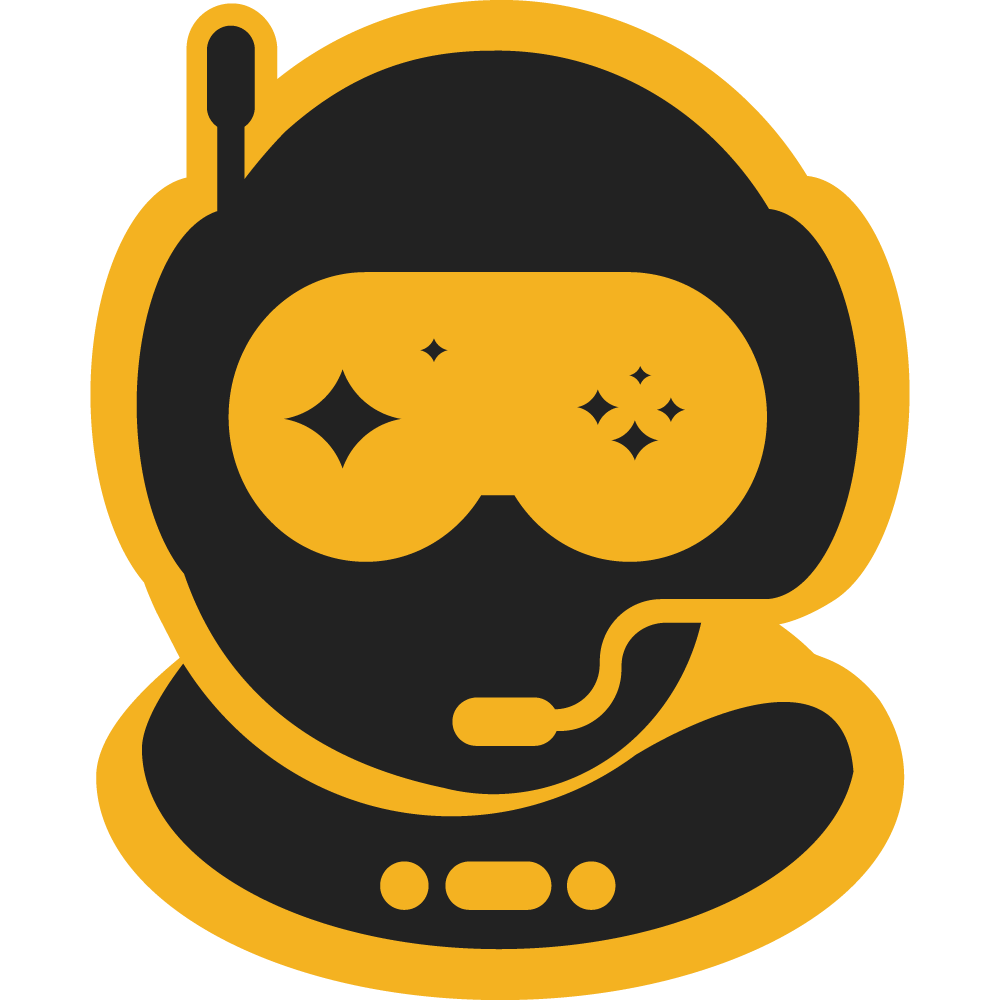
- Short name: SSG
- Divisions: Rocket League; Rainbow Six Siege; Halo Infinite; Overwatch 2; Brawl Stars
- Founded: June 15th 2017; 9 years ago
- Location: Headquarters: Layton, UT 84041; Teams: Vegas (Rainbow Six)
- Colors: Gold, Light Grey, Dark Grey
- Founder: Shaun McBride
- CEO: Shawn "Unit" Pellerin
- General manager: Jack "Battalion" Tucci
- Partners: Oats Overnight; Nomatic; SCUF Gaming; Skull Candy
- Parent group: The Spacestation
- Website: spacestationgaming.com

Spacestation Gaming (also referred to as SSG) is a multi-regional professional esports organization based in Utah, founded and owned by social media influencer Shaun "Shonduras" McBride. Since its founding, SSG has grown to include teams in eight different leagues and is active in esports content creation. They won the Rainbow Six Siege world championship in 2020.

== History ==
=== 2018 ===
In March 2018, SSG introduced its new Rainbow Six and Rocket League rosters. On April 27, SSG announced a strategic partnership with the NBA's Utah Jazz, designed to foster collaboration and growth within the two Utah-based organizations. That same month, the organization also entered the Battlerite competitive scene, with players Averse, Bloom, and Proster joining their roster. This team went on to win the Battlerite Pro League at Dreamhack. In June, SSG announced its partnership with Uber Eats – a first for Uber Eats in esports. On September 12, SSG announced its new partnership with gaming chair provider Vertagear to sell a custom SSG-branded chair.

=== 2019 ===
SSG entered 2019 with the announcement of their joining the Paladins Premier League. SSG also debuted its complete team of Rainbow Six players and creators, hoping to further integrate with the gaming community. Shortly after this announcement, the team placed in the top ten at The Six Invitational, 2019. The first SSG Apex Legends team was also announced and competed at the X-Games. In March, SSG announced their PUBG Mobile team, and soon after, they announced an updated 2019 Rocket League roster. This Rocket League team went on to compete in the Rocket League Season 8 Worlds. Sypical, a member of that team, was awarded Regular Season MVP for the 8th season of the RLCS.

SSG announced a brand partnership with Champion in April, which was released in Foot Locker stores across the United States. This partnership later grew into a full-fledged partnership, with additional SSG merchandise released by the brand. In August, SSG announced their first Brawl Stars roster, with additional rosters in other regions like Brazil and Southeast Asia announced in the following months. In October, SSG announced its partnership with mobile creators Powerbang and Clash With Ash. This partnership would see the development of new business ventures and new relationships with the mobile community. On October 15, SSG officially exited the PUBG esports scene, citing a lack of communication, inadequate feedback, and insufficient support from the league. SSG made their entry into Smash Bros Ultimate in November with the signing of LeoN, while the organization's first Trackmania racer, Matt, joined the organization in early December as their racer in the new Trackmania Grand League. On December 15, the SSG Rainbow Six: Siege team took first place at the US National Championship, earning the title of Team USA. The SSG Rocket League team also competed in Madrid for the RLCS World Championship, taking third place.

=== 2020 ===
The SSG Rainbow Six: Siege team continued their winning streak on February 17, winning the Six Invitational in Montreal, making them World Champions and earning $1 million. The championship was the first time in over three years that a North American team won a major tournament in the league. On March 2, SSG further cemented their departure from PUBG by officially releasing their mobile roster, giving the same reasons for their exit as they had in October 2019. After months of speculation, SSG officially acquired the Clash Royale roster of Blast Off Gaming on May 16. SSG then revealed their player lineup of Samuel Bassotto, thegod_rf, ah craaaap, and LaPoKaTi, with Trainer Luis as team director.

Soon after this announcement, SSG revealed that they had also signed the World of Warcraft Arena team, known formerly as The Boys, and would compete in the Arena World Championship in the North American region.

On April 4, SSG expanded into iRacing by announcing their partnership with NASCAR drivers Will Rodgers and Chase Cabre, competing under the banner of SSG in events like the NASCAR Coca-Cola iRacing Series and special invitational events during the COVID-19 pandemic.

On August 24, SSG announced four out of five members of their VALORANT roster, consisting of roca, insky, kaplan, and sSef to perform in a future Riot Games esport planned for its game. SSG's Rocket League team won the Fall North American Rocket League Major held from October 18 to 25. On November 23, Aimlabs and SSG announced their official partnership with their Rainbow 6, VALORANT, and future FPS teams.

=== 2021 ===
March 27 marked SSG's re-entry to Apex Legends with a team of Claraphii, Frexs, and Xenialstaken. In May, the SSG Rainbow Six: Siege team got into the Six Invitational 2021 Group Stage. Canadian came out of retirement to join the team in Paris due to passport issues with stand-in player, Luke. The team made it into the playoffs but lost their first match in the lower bracket, eliminating them from the tournament. SSG then signed Matthew "Hotancold" Stevens on June 4 after SSG needed an in-game leader to replace Canadian. On June 2, 2021, SSG announced their return to the PUBG esports scene with the signing of the Spicy Fish roster.

On August 24, SSG announced a collaboration with Ubisoft to produce official Rainbow 6 merchandise. The merchandise line is based around Rainbow 6 characters and features unique printing techniques inspired by each character. It's the first collaboration of its kind for SSG.

Later the following week, on August 30, Microsoft announced the Halo Championship Series to launch Halo Infinite and included SSG as one of nine teams.

September 2 marked the announcement of Thinkingnade leaving SSG as he announced his retirement from playing professional Rainbow 6 Siege, citing no longer having a desire to play the game and pursuing a career in real estate. Thinkingnade was soon replaced by Skys on September 6. SSG also announced the addition of Mari "AtomicMari" Takahashi to the organization as a co-owner on September 25 alongside Shaun "Shonduras" McBride, Shawn Holladay, and Takahashi's business partner Peter Kitch.

=== 2022 ===
On January 11, Caden “Sypical” Pellegrin leaves the Rocket League team, and on January 12, young Daniel “Daniel” Piecenski joins in place of Sypical. The team rallied and placed 3rd in the Winter Major. After RLCS Worlds, Retals leaves and is replaced with Logan “LJ” Wilt on September 21.

May 9 marks the day that Spacestation Gaming gets into Splitgate by signing Kyle “KJewls” Julian, Matt “Visions” Williams, Eljas “WuTum” Vierto, Vincent “Chenzo” Cronin, and Razaplaza. They took 1st place in the season and 2nd place in the championship.

Apex Legends qualified for the ALGS Championship and took 6th place on July 10. With Frexs, Xenial, and Dropped.

Halo had some changes with the previous team getting dropped, and on August 29, Atzin “Atzo” Mayen, Irving “Drift” Ramirez, Josbe “Tapping Buttons” Valadez, John “Pelu” Montoya, and Carlos “Nugget” Marlasca joined Spacestation Gaming. With that team added, they were then dropped on November 11, with the new additions being signed on November 28. Adam “bound” Gray, Kevin “Eco” Smith, Braedon “Stellur” Boettcher, and Zane “Pznguin” Hearon are being added to the squad.

=== 2023 ===
With a big team change in Rainbow Six, the team added five new people to the roster. Bryan “Merc” Wrzek, Roman “Forrest” Breaux, Jack “J9O” Burkard, Adam ”Mango” Pazner, and Seth ”Callout” Mik are the ones to join the squad. Merc's departure on May 22 opened up a spot for Liam "Ashn" Paz to join the team. The squad then competed in the R6 World Championship with a 5th-place finish. March 31 marks the day Jynxzi joined Spacestation Gaming as a content creator.

=== 2024 ===
On May 6, 2024, the Esports World Cup Foundation, funded by the Saudi Arabia Public Investment Fund and organizers of the Esports World Cup tournament series, announced the 30 organizations (known in the ESWC as Clubs) who would make up the Club Support Program, with Spacestation being one of them. This program gives teams a one-time six-figure stipend if an organization is willing to enter new esports as well as additional funding each year if they drive viewership and fan engagement to the Esports World Cup.

Spacestation Gaming got accepted into the Brawl Stars esports partnership program and will be competing in the Brawl Stars Championship Series.

SSG won the ALGS Year 4 Split 2 Playoffs in Mannheim, Germany winning 300,000 USD of prize money.

SSG had the most dominant run in Halo history, winning 3 of the 4 Majors as well as the Halo World Championships in Seattle, Washington on October 6th.

=== 2025 ===
Spacestation Gaming got accepted into the Overwatch partnership program for 2025.

Spacestation Gaming competed and qualified to world finals in their first season in Brawl Stars in the North America scene.

Spacestation Gaming signed a roster for The Finals first major tournament hosted by Embark Studios at Dreamhack Sweden.

== Tournament results ==
=== Rainbow Six: Siege ===
| Tournament | Location | Date | Placement |
|---|---|---|---|
| NAL – 2021 Season – Stage 2 | Las Vegas, Nevada | 2021-06-15 | 1st |
| Six Invitational 2021 | Paris, Italy | 2021-05-20 | 13th/16th |
| NAL 2020 US Division – Finals | Online | 2021-01-22 | 3rd/4th |
| Six November 2020 Major – North America | Online | 2020-11-15 | 2nd |
| Six August 2020 Major – North America | Online | 2020-08-16 | 3rd |
| NAL S1 – US Division – Stage 1 | Online | 2020-07-22 | 1st |
| Pro League Season 11 – North America | Online | 2020-04-13 | 1st |
| Six Invitational 2020 | Montreal, Canada | 2020-02-16 | 1st |
| United States Nationals 2019 | Las Vegas, Nevada | 2019-12-15 | 1st |
| OGA PIT Season 3 | Split, Croatia | 2019-12-08 | 2nd |
| Pro League Season 10 – North America | Online | 2019-12-08 | 5th |
| Six Major Raleigh 2019 | Raleigh, North Carolina | 2019-08-18 | 5th/8th |
| Pro League Season 9 – North America | Online | 2019-04-22 | 5th |
| Six Invitational 2019 | Montreal, Canada | 2019-02-15 | 5th/8th |
| United States Nationals 2018 | Las Vegas, Nevada | 2018-12-16 | 3rd/4th |
| Pro League Season 7 – North America | Online | 2018-04-16 | 3rd/4th |

=== Rocket League ===
| Tournament | Location | Date | Placement |
|---|---|---|---|
| RLCS 2022-23 World Championship | Offline | 2023-08-13 | 5th-8th |
| Gamers8 2022 | Offline | 2022-07-17 | 5th-8th |
| RLCS 2021–22 Spring: NA Regional Event 1 – Verizon 5G Ultra Cup | Online | 2022-05-01 | 2nd |
| RLCS 2021–22 Winter Split Major | Offline | 2022-03-27 | 3rd |
| RLCS 2021–22 X Games Open – Winter: NA Regional Event | Online | 2022-01-14 | 2nd |
| RLCS Season X – Spring: NA Regional Event 2 | Online | 2021-04-11 | 1st |
| RLCS Season X – Winter: NA Regional Event 2 | Online | 2020-12-10 | 2nd |
| RLCS Season X – Fall: NA Major | Online | 2020-10-25 | 1st |
| RLCS Season X – Fall: NA Regional Event 1 | Online | 2020-08-15 | 1st |
| Rocket League Spring Series – North America | Online | 2020-04-26 | 4th |
| Rocket League Season 9 Regional Championship – North America | Online | 2020-03-28 | 2nd |
| RLCS Season 8 Finals | Online | 2019-12-15 | 3rd/4th |
| RLCS Season 8 – North America | Online | 2019-11-16 | 3rd |
| RLCS Season 7 – North America | Online | 2019-05-11 | 5th |

=== PUBG ===
| Tournament | Location | Date | Placement |
|---|---|---|---|
| Global Championship | Thailand | 2023-11-18 | 12th |

=== Halo ===
| Tournament | Location | Date | Placement |
|---|---|---|---|
| HCS Major | Arlington | 2024-03-17 | 1st |
| HCS Major | Atlanta | 2024-07-28 | 1st |
| HCS MAJOR | SALT LAKE CITY | 2024-09-09 | 1st |
| World Championships | Seattle | 2024-10-06 | 1st |

== Rosters ==
Spacestation Gaming rosters

Brawl Stars
| Handle | Name | Nationality |
|---|---|---|
| Bobby | Levitt, Daniel | Canada |
| Chino | Contreras, Kevin | United States |
| Sans | Whitaker, Curtis | United States |

Halo Infinite
| Handle | Name | Nationality |
|---|---|---|
| SnakeBite | Duarte, Paul | United States |
| Eco | Smith, Kevin | United States |
| Lucid | Wilson, Tommy | United States |
| StelluR | Boettcher, Braedon | United States |

Rainbow Six Siege
| Handle | Name | Nationality |
|---|---|---|
| Fultz | Fultz, Alec | United States |
| Benjamaster | Dereli, Benjamin | Denmark |
| J90 | Burkard, Jack | United States |
| Ashn | Paz, Liam | United States |
| Forrest | Breaux, Roman | United States |

Rocket League
| Handle | Name | Nationality |
|---|---|---|
| zach | Stone, Zachary | United States |
| Diaz | Henrique, Joao | Brazil |
| reveal | LeDuc, Jack | United States |

The Finals
| Handle | Name | Nationality |
|---|---|---|
| Lamp | Sterling | United States |
| Normalize | Noah | United States |
| Graduating | Brandon | United States |

Overwatch
| Handle | Name | Nationality |
|---|---|---|
| Hawk | Domecq, Xander | United States |
| RhynO | Willoughby, Michael | United States |
| Sugarfree | Hijada, Kamden | United States |
| Lethal | Tari, Denis | Turkey |
| scissors | Léon, Alejando | United States |
| Admiral | Vahar, Oliver | Estonia |
| UltraViolet | David, Benjamin | United States |

Legend:
- (I) Inactive
- (S) Suspended
- (L) On loan
- (2W) Two-way player
- Substitute
- (injured) Injury / Illness

Awards and achievements
| Preceded by G2 Esports | Six Invitational winner 2020 | Succeeded by Ninjas in Pyjamas |
