= Scarz =

Japanese esports organization

SCARZ
- Short name: SZ
- Divisions: Call of Duty; Counter-Strike: Global Offensive; FIFA; Fortnite; PlayerUnknown's Battlegrounds; Rainbow Six Siege; Vainglory; Winning Eleven; Apex Legends; Identity V
- Founded: February 2012
- Location: Japan
- CEO: Yoichi "TFORT" Tomori
- Manager: Naoya "NAO" Endo
- Partners: AMD; FC Tokyo; Kingston; LG Electronics; Netgear; New Balance
- Parent group: XENOZ Co., Ltd.
- Website: www.scarz.net

Scarz (stylized as SCARZ) is a Japanese esports organization that was founded in 2012. It has players competing in the domestic and international scenes as a representative of Japan's esports community.

== History ==
The organization was founded in February 2012 as an amateur team competing in the Battlefield 3 pro scene. It then became a professional esports organization in 2015. The name SCARZ was derived from "scars," as the organization was "founded with the intention of leaving an impression on people's hearts". The organization also has a mentorship program to train Japanese emerging pro players. On 13 April 2018, the organization began a partnership with Japanese football club FC Tokyo.

== Current rosters ==
=== Apex Legends – Europe ===
Nat.	ID	Role	Join Date
(Germany)	Gerovic12	Defensive	2022-11-02
(Germany)	Taisheen	Recon	2021-03-20
(Portugal)	Hiarka	Offensive	2022-11-02

=== Call of Duty ===
Nat.	ID	Role	Join Date
(Japan)	Hunt	Player	2015-10-27
(Japan)	Leisia	Player	2018-01-21
(Japan)	Panther	Player	2018-01-21
(Japan)	Ponty	Player	2018-06-11
(Japan)	Ekiben	Manager	2018-04-21

=== Tom Clancy's Rainbow Six Siege ===
Nat.	ID	Name	Role	Join Date
(South Korea)	iLeven	Wonil Cha	Player	2019-06-12
(South Korea)	Demic	Daeyeong Kim	Player	2019-06-12
(South Korea)	Coldbro		Player	2020-9-21
(South Korea)	Nosferatu		Player	2020-9-21
(South Korea)	Kanos	Seongbeom Lee	Player	2020-01-30
(Italy)	Hybrid	Riccardo Massimino Font	Coach	2019-06-12

== Former rosters ==
=== Counter-Strike: Global Offensive ===
Nat.	ID	Name	Role
(Japan)	barce	Ryo Takebayashi	Support
(Japan)	crow	Tomoaki Maruoka	Lurker
(Japan)	Laz	Koji Ushida	In-game leader
(Japan)	t4k3J	Shogo Takemori	Support
(Japan)	Reita	Ryu Oshiro	Rifler
(Japan)	poem	Yumeki Shibasaki	Entry fragger
(Japan)	zyoutan	Tatsumi Goto	Manager
