= 2024 Esports World Cup =

Esports tournament series held in Saudi Arabia

Tournament information
- Sport: Esports
- Location: Riyadh, Saudi Arabia
- Dates: 3 July–25 August
- Administrator: Esports World Cup Foundation; Tournaments supervised by ESL
- Venue: Boulevard City
- Number of events: 23 in 22 esports
- Purse: $62.5 million
- Website: esportsworldcup.com

Final positions
- Champion: Team Falcons (1st title)
- 1st runner-up: Team Liquid
- 2nd runner-up: Team BDS

The 2024 Esports World Cup (EWC) was the first edition of the Esports World Cup, an annual international esports tournament series run by the Esports World Cup Foundation. It took place in Riyadh, Saudi Arabia from 3 July to 25 August 2024 and was the world's largest esports event, featuring 23 events in 22 different video game titles and a combined prize pool of US$62.5 million, the largest in esports history at the time.

== Background ==
The initial five game titles were announced on 20 February 2024, with additional events being added over the course of the next four months; the final initial titles—the 20th being Call of Duty: Warzone and the 21st being Modern Warfare III—were added on June 12. Strinova was added as an additional title on 1 August 2024.

The eight-week event took place in a 645,000 square foot (59,900 m^{2}) venue in Riyadh's Boulevard City that featured four separate esports arenas: the SEF Arena (known as the Qiddiya City Arena for sponsorship purposes), the 5V5 Arena (known as the Amazon Arena for sponsorship purposes), the BR Arena (known as the stc Arena for sponsorship purposes) and the Riyadh Festival. The stc Play Gaming Hall, also in Boulevard City, hosted last chance qualifiers for some games as well as the Strinova tournament.

== Format ==
The Esports World Cup encompassed 23 tournaments across its 22 competitive titles. Each tournament adhered to its own unique format and rules, while 22 of the tournaments contributed to a larger competition known as the Club Championship.

=== Club Championship ===
The Club Championship was a cross-game competition within the Esports World Cup. The championship gave out a total of US$20 million among the top 16 clubs (used by the EWC in place of "organization"), determined by their overall performance in various games throughout the tournament. To qualify for the Club Championship, a club had to finish in the top 8 in at least two competitions, and to win the championship title, the club also had to secure first place in at least one competition. Only participants who were publicly announced as part of their respective organization before 14 June 2024 for most games, or 28 June 2024 for the Call of Duty games, were eligible to earn points for their club. Below is a breakdown of the points awarded based on placement in the individual game championships:

Point distribution per event (Note: For events with no tiebreakers, 3–4 receive 275 points, 5–6 receive 90 points, 5–8 receive 60 points, and/or 7–8 receive 30 points.)
Pos.	Points	Pos.	Points
1	1000	5	110
2	600	6	70
3	350	7	40
4	200	8	20

=== Club Support Program ===
The Esports World Cup Foundation's Club Support Program was an initiative designed to provide substantial financial assistance to selected esports organizations. Through this program, chosen teams received annual financial support to enhance their operations and create more opportunities for professional players. A total of 30 esports organizations were selected to the Club Support Program, 22 of which were invited and 8 were admitted out of over 150 applicants based on past competitive achievements, future strategies, and approaches to fan engagement. As with all other competitors in the EWC, members of the Club Support Program must have earned qualification for each game's event and the Club Championship, but they remained eligible for annual financial rewards irrespective of their qualification status, as well as a one-time payment if an organization wants to enter new esports, particularly those who had a presence at the Esports World Cup. The rewards were contingent upon each member's capacity to enhance viewership and fan engagement for the EWC. The Club Support Program was replaced by the Club Partner Program the following year.

The 30 teams represented the five major competitive regions — Europe, North America, Asia, South America, and the Middle East — with the majority of the teams being primarily based in Europe or North America.

Europe

- Fnatic
- G2 Esports
- Guild Esports
- Karmine Corp
- Movistar KOI (Note: OverActive Media, who own Movistar KOI, will have its teams compete as Toronto Ultra for the 2024 EWC.)
- OG
- Natus Vincere
- Ninjas in Pyjamas
- Team Liquid
- Team Secret
- Team Vitality
- Tundra Esports
- Virtus.pro

North America

- 100 Thieves
- Cloud9
- FaZe Clan
- Gaimin Gladiators
- NRG
- Spacestation Gaming
- TSM

Asia

- Blacklist International
- LGD Gaming
- Gen.G Esports
- T1
- Talon Esports
- Weibo Gaming

South America

- Furia Esports
- LOUD

Middle East

- Team Falcons
- Twisted Minds

== Calendar ==
●	Competitions days

July/August 2024		July																													August																								
July/August 2024		Week 1					Week 2							Week 3							Week 4							Week 5							Week 6							Week 7							Week 8						
July/August 2024		3	4	5	6	7	8	9	10	11	12	13	14	15	16	17	18	19	20	21	22	23	24	25	26	27	28	29	30	31	1	2	3	4	5	6	7	8	9	10	11	12	13	14	15	16	17	18	19	20	21	22	23	24	25
Apex Legends																														●	●	●	●	●																					
Call of Duty: Modern Warfare III																																													●	●	●	●							
Call of Duty: Warzone		●	●	●	●																																																		
Counter-Strike 2																●	●	●	●	●																																			
Dota 2			●	●	●	●			●	●	●	●	●		●	●	●	●	●	●																																			
EA Sports FC 24																																													●	●	●	●							
Fortnite																																						●	●	●	●														
Garena Free Fire									●	●	●	●	●																																										
Honor of Kings																															●	●	●	●																					
Mobile Legends: Bang Bang	Men's	●	●	●	●	●			●	●	●	●	●																																										
Mobile Legends: Bang Bang	Women's																							●	●	●	●																												
League of Legends			●	●	●	●																																																	
Overwatch 2																							●	●	●	●	●																												
PUBG: Battlegrounds																																																			●	●	●	●	●
PUBG Mobile																		●	●	●		●	●		●	●	●																												
Rainbow Six Siege																														●	●	●	●	●																					
Rennsport																																																				●	●	●	●
Rocket League																																																				●	●	●	●
StarCraft II																																												●	●	●	●	●							
Street Fighter 6																																						●	●	●	●														
Strinova																																			●	●																			
Teamfight Tactics																																						●	●	●	●														
Tekken 8																																																			●	●	●		

== Results ==
=== Event winners ===
Event	Gold	Silver	Bronze
Apex Legends	Alliance; Effect; Hakis unlucky	Team Falcons; Genburten; ImperialHal; Zer0	Luminosity Gaming; Fuhhnq; Sikezz sweetdreams
Call of Duty: Modern Warfare III	Atlanta FaZe aBeZy; Cellium; Drazah; Simp	100 Thieves (Note: 100 Thieves represented the Los Angeles Thieves of the Call of Duty League.); Ghosty; JoeDecieves; Kremp; Nastie	OpTic Gaming (Note: OpTic Gaming represented OpTic Texas of the Call of Duty League.); Dashy; Kenny; Pred; Shotzzy
Call of Duty: Modern Warfare III	Atlanta FaZe aBeZy; Cellium; Drazah; Simp	100 Thieves; Ghosty; JoeDecieves; Kremp; Nastie	Vancouver Surge; 04; Abuzah; Breszy; Huke
Call of Duty: Warzone	Team Falcons; Biffle; Shifty; Soka	Fnatic; Almond; Newbz; Skullface	Twisted Minds; Aydan; Knight zSmit
Counter-Strike 2	Natus Vincere; Aleksib b1t iM jL w0nderful	G2 Esports huNter- NiKo malbsMd m0NESY; Snax	Virtus.pro electroNic fame FL1T; Jame n0rb3r7
Counter-Strike 2	Natus Vincere; Aleksib b1t iM jL w0nderful	G2 Esports huNter- NiKo malbsMd m0NESY; Snax	MOUZ; Brollan; Jimpphat siuhy torzsi xertioN
Dota 2 (Note: Known as the Riyadh Masters 2024, part of the Riyadh Masters series and a stop on the ESL Pro Tour. Both previous seasons of the tournament were part of Gamers8, the predecessor of EWC.)	Gaimin Gladiators; Ace dyrachyo Quinn; Seleri tOfu	Team Liquid; 33; Boxi; Insania miCKe; Nisha	Team Falcons; ATF; Cr1t- Malr1ne skiter Sneyking
EA Sports FC 24	jafonso (Luna Galaxy)	Young (Tuzzy E-Sports)	PHzin (Al-Ula FC)
EA Sports FC 24	jafonso (Luna Galaxy)	Young (Tuzzy E-Sports)	AbuMakkah (Team Falcons)
Fortnite (Note: This event is not sponsored, endorsed, or administered by Epic Games. This tournament will use the ESL Featuring Fortnite Squads mode instead of Duos like in the Fortnite Champion Series, and the tournament is officially known as Esports World Cup: Featuring Fortnite.)	XSET; Cold; Edgey; Muz; Ritual	Exceed; Kwanti; Meelks; Okis; Peterbot	Heroic; Fredoxie; Hellfire; Kiro; Th0masHD
Fortnite	XSET; Cold; Edgey; Muz; Ritual	Exceed; Kwanti; Meelks; Okis; Peterbot	Karmine Corp; Anas; Malibuca; Merstach; SwizzY
Garena Free Fire (Note: Tournament is part of the Free Fire World Series.)	Team Falcons; COUGAR; COZQ; ONEMORE; ONFIRE; PETER	EVOS Divine; AbaaaX; AimGOD; Bara; Geday; Reyyy	Netshoes Miners; General; NANDO9; Proxx7; Raone7
Honor of Kings (Note: Known as the Honor of Kings Invitational Midseason 2024, part of the Honor of Kings Invitational Series.)	KPL Dream Team (Note: Representative all-star team made up of players from China's King Pro League. The clubs these players come from are listed in parentheses.); Cat (All Gamers); Chance (Douyu Gaming); Fly (Rogue Warriors); Fox (LGD NBW); Hai (EStar Pro); NoFear (JD Gaming); Pang (Wolves); Qing (Talent Gaming); Rong (EStar Pro); Yinuo (All Gamers)	LGD Gaming MY; Jimmy; JR; Muskang King; Siang; Zhe; Zhihong	Keyd Stars; 0ne Dani; Maynah; Niap; Supinão ySacer
Honor of Kings	KPL Dream Team; Cat (All Gamers); Chance (Douyu Gaming); Fly (Rogue Warriors); Fox (LGD NBW); Hai (EStar Pro); NoFear (JD Gaming); Pang (Wolves); Qing (Talent Gaming); Rong (EStar Pro); Yinuo (All Gamers)	LGD Gaming MY; Jimmy; JR; Muskang King; Siang; Zhe; Zhihong	All Gamers Global; Lived; Myosotis; Qinglin; SNOW; Zaiz
Mobile Legends: Bang Bang – Men (Note: Known as the MLBB Mid Season Cup 2024.)	Selangor Red Giants; Innocent; Kramm; Sekys; Stormie; YumS	Falcons AP Bren (Note: Due to a partnership, the points earned by this team go to Team Falcons.); FlapTzy; KyleTzy; Owgwen; Pheww; Super Marco	Liquid ECHO; Bennyqt; Jaypee; KarlTzy; Sanford; Sanji
Mobile Legends: Bang Bang – Men	Selangor Red Giants; Innocent; Kramm; Sekys; Stormie; YumS	Falcons AP Bren; FlapTzy; KyleTzy; Owgwen; Pheww; Super Marco	NIP Flash (Note: Due to a partnership, the points earned by this team go to Ninjas in Pyjamas.); Diablo; Hades; JPL; KurtTzy; Vanix
Mobile Legends: Bang Bang – Women (Note: Known as the MLBB Women's Invitational 2024.)	Omega Empress; Amoree; Ayanami; Keishi; Meraaay; Shinoa	Team Vitality; Chell; Cinny; Fumi; Vival; Vivian	Team Falcons Vega; Chincaaw; Funi; Meylane; Thall; Violet
Mobile Legends: Bang Bang – Women	Omega Empress; Amoree; Ayanami; Keishi; Meraaay; Shinoa	Team Vitality; Chell; Cinny; Fumi; Vival; Vivian	Victory Song Gamers; Gayleee; Kioway; Minun; Riyaan; Syncro
League of Legends (Note: This event is not sponsored, endorsed, or administered by Riot Games, but the tournament is officially sanctioned by the developers.)	T1; Zeus; Oner; Faker; Gumayusi; Keria	Top Esports; 369; Tian; Creme; JackeyLove; Meiko	Team Liquid; Impact; UmTi; APA; Yeon; CoreJJ
League of Legends	T1; Zeus; Oner; Faker; Gumayusi; Keria	Top Esports; 369; Tian; Creme; JackeyLove; Meiko	G2 Esports; BrokenBlade; Yike; Caps; Hans Sama; Mikyx
Overwatch 2	Crazy Raccoon; CH0R0NG; HeeSang; Junbin; LIP; MAX; Shu	Toronto Ultra; MER1T; Rupal; SOMEONE; Sugarfree; Vega	Team Falcons; ChiYo; Fielder; Hanbin; Proper; SirMajed smurf Stalk3r
Overwatch 2	Crazy Raccoon; CH0R0NG; HeeSang; Junbin; LIP; MAX; Shu	Toronto Ultra; MER1T; Rupal; SOMEONE; Sugarfree; Vega	ZETA DIVISION; AlphaYi; BERNAR; Fearless; FINN; Flora; Viol2t
PUBG: Battlegrounds (Note: Tournament is part of the PUBG Global Series.)	Soniqs hwinn Kickstart; Shrimzy; TGLTN	Petrichor Road; Aixleft; AZ; Cui71; Ming; Summer	FaZe Clan curexi Gustav; Fexx; Jeemzz
PUBG Mobile (Note: Known as the PUBG Mobile World Cup 2024, part of the PUBG Mobile Global Championship.)	Alpha7 Esports; Carrilho; Mafioso; Magrelin; Revo	Reject; Devine; Duelo; Reiji; SaRa	Tianba; GGBond; Long; Lyu; Qzzz
Rainbow Six Siege	Team BDS; BriD; LikEfac; Shaiiko; Solotov; Yuzus	w7m esports d4sh Dodez; Dotz; L0BIN volpz	Team Liquid; Lagonis; Maia; Nesk; Paluh resetz
Rainbow Six Siege	Team BDS; BriD; LikEfac; Shaiiko; Solotov; Yuzus	w7m esports d4sh Dodez; Dotz; L0BIN volpz	Furia Esports; FelipoX; HerdsZ; Jv92; Kheyze nade
Rennsport (Note: Tournament is part of the ESL R1 circuit. The results on top are for the Driver's Championship, which does not count towards the Esports World Cup Club Championship, while the results on the bottom are for the Team Championship, which does count towards the Esports World Cup Club Championship.)	Kevin Siggy (Team Redline)	Sebastian Job (Team Redline)	Maximilian Benecke (MOUZ)
Rennsport	Team Redline; Jeffery Rietveld; Kevin Siggy; Luke Bennett; Sebastian Job	Team Vitality; Erhan Jajovski; Jiri Toman; Marcell Csincsik; Thibault Cazaubon	MOUZ; Christopher Dambietz; Maximilian Benecke; Moritz Löhner; Yuri Kasdorp
Rocket League (Note: This event is not sponsored, endorsed, or administered by Psyonix, and will be known as Esports World Cup: Featuring Rocket League.)	Team BDS dralii ExoTiiK; M0nkey M00n	Team Falcons; Kiileerrz; Rw9 trk511	Gen.G Mobil1 Racing; ApparentlyJack; Chronic; Firstkiller
Rocket League	Team BDS dralii ExoTiiK; M0nkey M00n	Team Falcons; Kiileerrz; Rw9 trk511	G2 Stride; Atomic; Daniel nass
StarCraft II (Note: Tournament is part of the ESL Pro Tour.)	Clem (Team Liquid)	Serral (BASILISK)	Dark (Talon Esports)
StarCraft II	Clem (Team Liquid)	Serral (BASILISK)	herO (Weibo Gaming)
Street Fighter 6	Xiao Hai (KuaiShow Gaming)	Kawano (Good 8 Squad)	Tachikawa (Burning Core Toyama)
Street Fighter 6	Xiao Hai (KuaiShow Gaming)	Kawano (Good 8 Squad)	gachikun (Good 8 Squad)
Strinova (Note: Tournament does not count towards the Esports World Cup Club Championship.)	MMR; Fan; ON; Rite; Xiaowu yzii	Super Shuai; BriBri; BTMC; Kariyu lyr1c Tuonto	Nova Guardians kept Masuo; SKJsa2; SKJShinka; SoVault
Strinova	MMR; Fan; ON; Rite; Xiaowu yzii	Super Shuai; BriBri; BTMC; Kariyu lyr1c Tuonto	Twisted Minds; ExiT; Fr4nky; Gwzh; Saint; Zimo
Teamfight Tactics (Note: Tournament utilizes four-player teams instead of the conventional 1v1 competitive format.)	Wolves Esports; LiShao; Serein; Sheltie; YGQF	T1; Binteum; Bobae dunizuni sCsC	Team Vitality; K3soju; MilkK; Setsuko torontotokyo
Teamfight Tactics	Wolves Esports; LiShao; Serein; Sheltie; YGQF	T1; Binteum; Bobae dunizuni sCsC	Twisted Minds; 60second Huanmie; RiYue; Snowy
Tekken 8	ULSAN (Kwangdong Freecs)	ATIF (Team Falcons)	Yagami (Al Qadsiah FC)
Tekken 8	ULSAN (Kwangdong Freecs)	ATIF (Team Falcons)	Double (ZETA DIVISION)

=== Club Championship standings ===
Key
Colour	Result
Gold	Winner
Silver	Second place
Bronze	Third place or equivalent
Green	Other points position
Blue	Other classified position
Red	Did not qualify (DNQ)
White	Did not enter (–)

Pos.	Team	CWZ	LOL	FF	MSC	CS2	DOTA2	MWI	OW2	PUBGM	APEX	HOK	R6	FN	SF6	TFT	MW3	EAFC	SC2	REN	RL	PUBGB	T8	Points
1	Team Falcons	1	–	1	2	DNQ	3	3–4	3–4	17	2	11–12	DNQ	5–8	17–24	9–12	12–16	3–4	DNQ	7–8	2	11	2	5655
2	Team Liquid	–	3–4	–	3–4	DNQ	2	–	–	8	7	–	3–4	DNQ	17–24	DNQ	–	5–8	1	–	–	–	DNQ	2545
3	Team BDS	–	DNQ	–	–	–	–	–	–	–	–	–	1	–	–	–	–	DNQ	–	–	1	–	–	2000
4	Team Vitality	9	DNQ	–	–	5–8	–	2	–	–	–	11–12	–	–	DNQ	3–4	–	DNQ	6–7	2	5–8	–	9–12	1650
5	T1	–	1	–	–	–	–	–	–	–	–	–	–	DNQ	–	2	–	–	–	–	–	19	17–24	1600
6	FaZe Clan	–	–	–	–	5–8	–	–	–	DNQ	13	–	5–8	–	–	–	1	–	–	11	–	3	DNQ	1470
7	Gaimin Gladiators	21	–	8	DNQ	DNQ	1	~~5–8~~	9–12	DNQ	4	–	–	5–8	DNQ	–	–	DNQ	12–18	–	12–16	24	DNQ	1280
8	Natus Vincere	5	–	–	–	1	DNQ	–	–	DNQ	30	–	–	–	–	5–8	–	–	12–18	–	–	10	17–24	1170
9	G2 Esports	–	3–4	–	–	2	19–20	–	–	–	–	–	DNQ	–	–	–	12–16	–	–	9–10	3–4	–	–	1150
10	Kwangdong Freecs	–	DNQ	–	–	–	–	–	–	–	–	–	–	–	–	–	–	–	DNQ	–	–	5	1	1110
11	Toronto Ultra	–	DNQ	–	–	DNQ	–	–	2	–	–	–	–	–	–	5–8	5–8	–	–	–	–	–	–	720
12	Twisted Minds	3	DNQ	11	9–16	DNQ	–	DNQ	5–8	13	8	DNQ	DNQ	–	9–12	3–4	–	DNQ	8–11	–	9–12	18	9–12	710
13	MOUZ	–	DNQ	–	–	3–4	15–16	–	–	–	–	–	–	–	13–16	–	–	–	12–18	3	–	–	–	665
14	Fnatic	2	5–8	–	9–16	DNQ	–	–	9–12	–	18	–	DNQ	13–16	13–16	13–16	–	15–16	–	–	–	–	17–24	660
15	ZETA DIVISION	–	–	–	–	–	–	–	3–4	–	–	–	–	13–16	–	–	–	–	–	–	–	–	3–4	550
16	Furia Esports	–	DNQ	–	–	5–8	–	–	–	DNQ	DNQ	–	3–4	–	13–16	–	–	11–12	–	–	5–8	–	–	395
16	Weibo Gaming	–	DNQ	–	–	–	~~7–8~~	–	–	DNQ	38	5–8	–	–	DNQ	5–8	–	–	3–4	–	–	DNQ	–	395
18	All Gamers	18	DNQ	5	–	–	–	–	–	DNQ	–	3–4	–	–	–	–	–	–	12–18	–	–	9	–	385
19	Talon Esports	–	DNQ	–	–	–	DNQ	–	–	6	–	DNQ	13–16	–	DNQ	–	–	–	3–4	–	–	–	DNQ	345
20	Gen.G	–	5–8	–	–	DNQ	–	–	–	–	–	–	–	–	–	–	–	–	DNQ	–	3–4	DNQ	–	335
20	Virtus.pro	–	–	–	–	3–4	17–18	–	5–8	DNQ	24	DNQ	DNQ	–	17–24	–	–	DNQ	12–18	12	–	23	–	335
22	Guild Esports	4	–	–	–	DNQ	–	DNQ	–	–	9	–	–	DNQ	25–32	–	–	DNQ	–	6	–	–	DNQ	270
23	DRX	–	DNQ	–	–	–	–	–	–	4	–	–	–	9–12	–	–	–	–	–	–	–	–	5–8	260
24	Cloud9	20	DNQ	–	9–16	DNQ	–	5–8	–	–	DNQ	–	DNQ	–	17–24	–	5–8	5–8	8–11	–	DNQ	–	DNQ	185
25	Spacestation Gaming	–	–	–	–	–	–	–	5–8	–	17	–	5–8	–	–	–	–	–	–	–	5–8	DNQ	–	180
26	Team Spirit	–	–	–	9–16	5–8	7–8	–	–	27	–	–	–	–	–	–	–	–	–	–	–	–	–	90

Championship Notes:

- Only teams who have qualified for the Club Championship are listed here.
- A team may win the Club Championship by winning at least one event.

Club Notes:

1. All Gamers: All Gamers acquired the roster of Stalwart Esports in Free Fire. In League of Legends, their division is known as Anyone's Legend. Their teams in the Honor of Kings Invitational Midseason as well as PUBG: Battlegrounds were known as All Gamers Global; two of the players on their King Pro League team, Yinuo and Cat, made the KPL Dream Team in the former.
2. Cloud9: Cloud9 signed BloodThirstyKings for MSC and Reignfall for MWI to enter Mobile Legends: Bang Bang. They also partnered with beastcoast in Rainbow Six Siege (forming Cloud9 Beastcoast) and acquired the New York Subliners for Modern Warfare III (who became Cloud9 New York).
3. FaZe Clan: FaZe Clan acquired Made in Heaven in Apex Legends. FaZe also has a Fortnite division but did not enter qualifying tournaments for Esports World Cup: Featuring Fortnite. In Call of Duty: Modern Warfare III, they were represented by the Atlanta FaZe of the Call of Duty League.
4. Fnatic: Fnatic partnered with ONIC Esports in MSC for both their Indonesian and Filipino divisions; the Indonesian division qualified but did not score points for Fnatic.
5. G2 Esports: G2 Esports partnered with Invictus Gaming in Dota 2 to form G2.iG. In Rocket League, they are known as G2 Stride in a collaboration with Stride Esports. In Call of Duty: Modern Warfare III, they represent the CDL's Minnesota RØKKR.
6. Gaimin Gladiators: Gaimin Gladiators initially partnered with Indostars in Free Fire. Since EWC rules state that a club may only have one partnership, their subsequent partnership with HomeGirls (the female division of HomeBois) for MWI was ruled as ineligible. The points earned by Gaimin Gladiators HomeGirls, therefore, were not added to Gaimin's overall total.
7. Gen.G: Gen.G's Rocket League division is known as Gen.G Mobil1 Racing, in partnership with the Mobil 1 synthetic motor oil.
8. Guild Esports: Guild Esports acquired Serenity to re-enter Apex Legends. Their Counter-Strike 2 division was known as Guild Eagles after they acquired the then-unsigned Bad News Eagles roster. Guild would partner with R8 Esports for MWI, but failed to qualify. Whilst they also signed Dan "Stingray" Ray for EA Sports FC, he was released before the Last Chance Qualifier.
9. Kwangdong Freecs: In Tekken 8, both CherryBerryMango and ULSAN finished in the top 8 for Kwangdong Freecs, but only ULSAN's win earned them points in the Club Championship.
10. League of Legends: While the mentioned clubs have a League of Legends division, their position as a team not in the LCS, LEC, LCK or LPL meant that they weren't allowed to qualify for the Esports World Cup's League of Legends tournament.
11. Talon Esports: In League of Legends and Rainbow Six Siege, Talon Esports are known as PSG Talon in partnership with French football club Paris Saint-Germain. The team they sent to qualify for the Honor of Kings Invitational Midseason was known as Talon Esports ID; the main Talon team plays Arena of Valor and as such couldn't qualify for the tournament.
12. Team Falcons: In both MSC and MWI, Team Falcons had two teams qualify – Team Falcons (MPL MENA) and Falcons AP Bren (their partnership with AP Bren in MPL Philippines) for MSC, Team Falcons Vega (Indonesia) and Team Falcons Vega MENA for MWI. Falcons AP Bren scored points for MSC, while Team Falcons Vega scored points for MWI. Team Falcons also acquired the Apex Legends spot of DarkZero Esports by signing Zer0 and Genburten.
13. Team Liquid: Team Liquid acquired STUN.GG, owners of AURA Esports and ECHO Philippines, to enter Mobile Legends: Bang Bang. Their Filipino division, known then as Liquid ECHO, earned points for Team Liquid in MSC. They also partnered with Team Gullit for EA Sports FC; ManuBachoore scored points for Liquid. In StarCraft II, both Clem and Cure finished in points-paying positions, but only Clem's win counted towards their Club Championship total.
14. Toronto Ultra: Toronto Ultra acquired Never Lucky in Teamfight Tactics. OverActive Media (Toronto Ultra's owners) had their Overwatch 2 division, the Toronto Defiant, change their name to Toronto Ultra for the tournament. OverActive Media also own MAD Lions KOI in League of Legends and Movistar KOI in Counter-Strike 2; it is unknown if they would've changed their names to Toronto Ultra had they qualified for their respective tournaments.
15. Twisted Minds: Twisted Minds partnered with Legends Gaming in Apex Legends. They also participated in the Strinova tournament, finishing tied for 3rd place.
16. Team Vitality: Team Vitality acquired ONSYDE Gaming to enter StarCraft II. Solar and Maru qualified for the SCII tournament and finished in points-paying positions, but only Maru's 6th–7th finish counts towards their Club Championship total.
17. Weibo Gaming: Weibo Gaming partnered with Wonton Dumpling in Apex Legends and Xtreme Gaming for Dota 2; the latter's points counted for Xtreme Gaming and not Weibo. Their team in the Honor of Kings Invitational Midseason was known as Weibo Gaming MY; none of the players on their King Pro League team made the KPL Dream Team.

== Prize pool ==
The 2024 Esports World Cup had a prize pool of US$62.5 million, the largest combined prize pool in esports history. The prize money was broken down into four categories: the Club Championship, the individual Game Championships, Qualifiers, and MVP Awards. The Club Championship awarded $20 million to the top 16 teams based on their overall performance, while each of the 22 Game Championships had a combined prize pool of $33.8 million. Teams earned a combined $7 million during qualifying events, and the MVP of each event was awarded $50,000.

Prize money distribution
Category	Prize
Club Championship	$20,000,000
Game Championships	$33,800,000
Qualifiers	$7,600,000
MVP Awards	$1,100,000

Club Championship prize money distribution
Pos.	Team	Prize
1	Team Falcons	$7,000,000
2	Team Liquid	$4,000,000
3	Team BDS	$2,000,000
4	Team Vitality	$1,500,000
5	T1	$1,250,000
6	FaZe Clan	$1,000,000
7	Gaimin Gladiators	$800,000
8	Natus Vincere	$600,000
9	G2 Esports	$450,000
10	Kwangdong Freecs	$350,000
11	Toronto Ultra	$250,000
12	Twisted Minds	$200,000
13–15	MOUZ	$150,000
13–15	Fnatic	$150,000
13–15	ZETA DIVISION	$150,000
16–17	Furia Esports	$75,000
16–17	Weibo Gaming	$75,000

== Response ==
In March 2024, esports organization Ex Oblivione announced their decision not to participate in the Overwatch 2 competition at the 2024 Esports World Cup. The team expressed concerns about the lack of necessary accessibility for all members of their community and the potential exclusion of their fans from participating in the event alongside them. This decision received a mixed response from their followers and the community, with many expressing support for their stance while others criticized the organization.

In June 2024, the Esports Awards announced that they would hold a ceremony at the Esports World Cup in Riyadh in late August. The announcement was met with criticism from multiple esports personalities. Additionally, multiple stakeholders and personnel, including esports hosts Caleb Simmons and Alex "Goldenboy" Mendez, resigned from the Esports Awards panel.

== See also ==
- 2024 in esports
