= 2024 in esports =

This topic lists the esports events for the 2024 year.

If tournaments are held entirely online, it is denoted in the list below. For those tournaments that are held either partially or entirely offline, the host city that hosts the Grand Final is indicated last, if there are multiple host cities.

== Apex Legends ==
Tournament	Host city	Duration	Champion	Runner-up	Ref.
ALGS 2024 Split 1 Playoffs	(United States) Los Angeles	May 2–5	Reject Winnity	DarkZero Esports	
2024 Esports World Cup	(Saudi Arabia) Riyadh	August 1–4	Alliance	Team Falcons	
ALGS 2024 Split 2 Playoffs	(Germany) Mannheim	August 29 – September 1	Spacestation Gaming	Gaimin Gladiators	

== Counter-Strike 2 ==
Tournament	Host city	Duration	Champion	Runner-up	Ref.
PGL Major Copenhagen 2024	(Denmark) Copenhagen	March 17–31	Natus Vincere	FaZe Clan	
Skyesports Masters 2024	Online	April 8–14	Aurora Gaming	OG	
CCT Season 1 Global Finals	Online	May 16–24	Eternal Fire	Team Liquid	
2024 Esports World Cup	(Saudi Arabia) Riyadh	July 17–21	Natus Vincere	G2 Esports	
Thunderpick World Championship 2024	(Germany) Berlin	October 21 – November 3	The MongolZ	HEROIC	
Blast Premier World Final 2024	Singapore	October 30 – November 3	G2 Esports	Team Spirit	
Perfect World Shanghai Major 2024	(China) Shanghai	December 1–15	Team Spirit	FaZe Clan	

=== 2024 ESL Pro Tour ===
Tournament	Host city	Duration	Champion	Runner-up	Ref.
Intel Extreme Masters Katowice 2024	(Poland) Katowice	January 31 – February 11	Team Spirit	FaZe Clan	
Intel Extreme Masters Chengdu 2024	(China) Chengdu	April 8–14	FaZe Clan	Mouz	
ESL Pro League Season 19	(Malta) St. Julian's	April 23 – May 12	Mouz	Team Vitality	
Intel Extreme Masters Dallas 2024	(United States) Dallas	May 27 – June 2	G2 Esports	Team Vitality	
Intel Extreme Masters Cologne 2024	(Germany) Cologne	August 7–18	Team Vitality	Natus Vincere	
ESL Pro League Season 20	(Malta) St. Julian's	September 3–22	Natus Vincere	Eternal Fire	
Intel Extreme Masters Rio 2024	(Brazil) Rio de Janeiro	October 7–13	Natus Vincere	MOUZ	

== Dota 2 ==
Tournament	Host city	Duration	Champion	Runner-up	Ref.
BetBoom Dacha Dubai 2024	(United Arab Emirates) Dubai	February 4–16	Team Falcons	Team Liquid	
DreamLeague Season 22	Online	February 25 – March 10	Team Falcons	BetBoom Team	
Elite League 2024	Online	March 31 – April 14	Xtreme Gaming	Team Falcons	
ESL One Birmingham 2024	(United Kingdom) Birmingham	April 22–28	Team Falcons	BetBoom Team	
PGL Wallachia Season 1	(Romania) Bucharest	May 10–19	Team Spirit	Xtreme Gaming	
DreamLeague Season 23	Online	May 20–26	Team Falcons	Gaimin Gladiators	
Esports World Cup 2024: Riyadh Masters	(Saudi Arabia) Riyadh	July 4–21	Gaimin Gladiators	Team Liquid	
The International 2024	(Denmark) Copenhagen	September 4–15	Team Liquid	Gaimin Gladiators	

== EA Sports FC 24 ==
Tournament	Host city	Duration	Champion	Runner-up	Ref.
FC Pro Open	(United Kingdom) London	September 27 – February 3	PHzin	Vejrgang	
FC Pro World Championship 2024	(Germany) Berlin	July 11–13	Vejrgang	YuvalBeli	
Esports World Cup 2024	(Saudi Arabia) Riyadh	August 15–18	jafonso	Young	

== Football Manager ==
Tournament	Host city	Duration	Champion	Runner-up	Ref.
2024 FIFAe World Cup featuring Football Manager	(England) Liverpool	August 29 – September 1	Miracle	Svonn	

== Fortnite ==
Tournament	Host city	Duration	Champion(s)	Runner-up	Ref.
Dreamhack Dallas 2024	(United States) Dallas	May 31 – June 2	Team Falcons	Agent Gaming	
Esports World Cup 2024	(Saudi Arabia) Riyadh	August 8–11	XSET	Exceed	
Fortnite Champion Series 2024 – Global Championship	(United States) Fort Worth	September 7–8	Peterbot & Pollo	Queasy & Th0masHD	

== League of Legends ==
Tournament	Host city	Duration	Champion	Runner-up	Ref.
2024 Mid-Season Invitational	(China) Chengdu	May 1–19	Gen.G	Bilibili Gaming	
Esports World Cup 2024	(Saudi Arabia) Riyadh	July 4–7	T1	Top Esports	
2024 League of Legends World Championship	(England) London	September 25 – November 2	T1	Bilibili Gaming	

== Mobile Legends: Bang Bang ==
Tournament	Host city	Duration	Champion	Runner-up	Ref.
Games of the Future 2024	(Russia) Kazan	February 26 – March 2	AP Bren	ONIC Esports	
MPL LATAM Season 1	(Brazil) São Paulo	March 9 – May 4	RRQ Akira	Entity7	
MPL Philippines Season 13	(Philippines) Manila	March 15 – May 26	Liquid ECHO	AP Bren	
MPL Malaysia Season 13	(Malaysia) Selangor	March 29 – June 2	Selangor Red Giants	Homebois	
MPL Indonesia Season 13	(Indonesia) Jakarta	March 8 – June 9	Fnatic ONIC	EVOS Glory	
MPL MENA Season 5	(Saudi Arabia) Riyadh	April 18 – June 15	Team Falcons	Twisted Minds	
MPL Singapore Season 7	Singapore	May 4 – June 16	NIP Flash	RSG SG	
MLBB Mid-Season Cup 2024	(Saudi Arabia) Riyadh	July 1–14	Selangor Red Giants	Falcons AP Bren	
MLBB Women's Invitational 2024	(Saudi Arabia) Riyadh	July 24–27	Omega Empress	Team Vitality	
Snapdragon Pro Series Season 5 – APAC Challenger Finals	(Indonesia) Jakarta	July 28 – August 4	Falcons AP Bren	Team Liquid Philippines	
IESF World Championship 2024 – Men's Tournament	(Saudi Arabia) Riyadh	November 11–19	Malaysia	Philippines	
IESF World Championship 2024 – Women's Tournament	(Saudi Arabia) Riyadh	November 11–19	Indonesia	Cambodia	
MLBB M6 World Championship	Malaysia	November 28 – December 15	Fnatic ONIC Philippines	Team Liquid Indonesia	

== Overwatch 2 ==
Tournament	Host city	Duration	Champion	Runner-up	Ref.
2024 Overwatch Champions Series Major	(United States) Dallas	May 31 – June 2	Crazy Raccoon	Team Falcons	
2024 Esports World Cup	(Saudi Arabia) Riyadh	July 24–28	Crazy Raccoon	Toronto Ultra	
2024 Overwatch Champions Series Finals	(Sweden) Stockholm	November 22–24	Team Falcons	Crazy Raccoon	

== PUBG: Battlegrounds ==
Tournament	Host city	Duration	Champion	Ref.
PUBG Global Series 3 2024	(China) Shanghai	May 20–26	CERBERUS Esports	
PUBG Global Series 4 2024	(China) Shanghai	June 3–9	Twisted Minds	
2024 Esports World Cup	(Saudi Arabia) Riyadh	August 21–25	Soniqs	
PUBG Nations Cup 2024	(South Korea) Seoul	September 6–8	South Korea	
PUBG Global Series 5 2024	(Thailand) Bangkok	October 21–27	Twisted Minds	
PUBG Global Series 6 2024	(Thailand) Bangkok	November 4—10	Twisted Minds	
PUBG Global Championship 2024	(Malaysia) Kuala Lumpur	December 9–22	The Expendables	

== Rocket League ==
Tournament	Host city	Duration	Champion	Runner-up	Ref.
RLCS 2024 – Major 1: Copenhagen	(Denmark) Copenhagen	March 28–31	Gentle Mates Alpine	G2 Esports	
RLCS 2024 – Major 2: London	(England) London	June 20–23	G2 Esports	Team Falcons	
2024 Esports World Cup	(Saudi Arabia) Riyadh	August 22–25	Team BDS	Team Falcons	
RLCS 2024 – World Championship	(United States) Fort Worth	September 10–15	Team BDS	G2 Esports	

== Teamfight Tactics ==
Tournament	Host city	Duration	Winner	Runner-up	Ref.
Remix Rumble Championship	Online	March 1–3	milala	RiYue	
Inkborn Fables Tactician’s Crown	Online	July 12–14	Dishsoap	Double61	
2024 Esports World Cup	(Saudi Arabia) Riyadh	August 8–11	Wolves Esports	T1	
Magic n' Mayhem Tactician's Crown	Online	November 8–10	title	RiYue	
TFT Macao Open	(Macau) Macao	December 13–15	Shiquz	Liluo	

== Tom Clancy's Rainbow Six Siege ==
Tournament	Host city	Duration	Winner	Runner-up	Ref.
Six Invitational 2024	(Brazil) São Paulo	February 13–25	w7m esports	Faze Clan	
BLAST R6 Major Manchester 2024	(England) Manchester	May 16–26	Beastcoast	Team BDS	
2024 Esports World Cup	(Saudi Arabia) Riyadh	July 31 – August 4	Team BDS	w7m esports	
BLAST R6 Major Montreal 2024	(Canada) Montreal	November 7–17	w7m Esports	Team BDS	

== Tetris ==
June 7–9: 2024 Classic Tetris World Championship in (United States) Pasadena

- (gold) (United States) Alex Thach ("AlexT")
- (silver) (United States) Michael Artiaga ("DogPlayingTetris")
- Semifinalists: (United States) Tristan Kwai ("Tristop") & (United States) Noah Dengler ("TheDengler")

== Valorant ==
Tournament	Host city	Duration	Champion	Runner-up	Ref.
2024 Valorant Champions Tour: Pacific Kickoff	(South Korea) Seoul	February 17–25	Gen.G	Paper Rex	
2024 Valorant Champions Tour: EMEA Kickoff	(Germany) Berlin	February 20 – March 1	Karmine Corp	Team Heretics	
2024 Valorant Champions Tour: Americas Kickoff	(United States) Los Angeles	February 16 – March 3	Sentinels	LOUD	
2024 Valorant Champions Tour: China Kickoff	(China) Shanghai	February 22 – March 2	Edward Gaming	FunPlus Phoenix	
2024 Valorant Champions Tour: Madrid Masters	(Spain) Madrid	March 14–24	Sentinels	Gen.G	
2024 Valorant Champions Tour: Shanghai Masters	(China) Shanghai	May 23 – June 9	Gen.G	Team Heretics	
2024 Valorant Champions	(South Korea) Seoul	August 1–25	Edward Gaming	Team Heretics	
