= Genburten =

Turkish-Australian esports player

Personal information
- Name: Noyan Ozkose
- Born: 20 September
- Nationality: Australian

Current team
- Team: Crazy Thieves
- Game: Apex Legends

Career information
- Playing career: 2020–present

Team history
- 2021–2022: Reignite South / Reignite (Note: In 2021, Reignite South was renamed Reignite after Reignite North was disbanded.)
- 2022–2024: DarkZero Esports
- 2024: Team Falcons
- 2024: The Dojo
- 2024–present: 100 Thieves / Crazy Thieves (Note: In 2026, 100 Thieves was renamed Crazy Thieves after a collaboration with Crazy Racoon.)

Career highlights and awards
- ALGS Champion (2022); 2× ALGS Split Playoffs winner (2022 Split 2, 2023 Split 2); 2× ALGS Pro League – APAC South region winner (2021 Split 1, 2022 Split 2); ALGS Pro League – NA region winner (2024 Split 1)

Twitch information
- Channel: Genburten
- Followers: 529K

YouTube information
- Channel: Genburten
- Years active: 2020–present
- Genre: Gaming
- Subscribers: 264K
- Views: 21.7 million
- Last updated: 30 August 2024

Noyan Ozkose, better known by his online alias and gaming handle Genburten, is an Australian/Turkish professional Apex Legends player currently playing for Crazy Thieves.

== Apex Legends career ==
=== Early career and Reignite ===
Of a Turkish background, he and his father are immigrants from Turkey; his father has supported his esports career. In 2021, Genburten signed with Reignite South. Genburten's teammates on Reignite included fellow Australians Rick "Sharky" Wirth and Rhys "Zer0" Perry. The trio played in the APAC South region. They would win the APAC South region's 2022 ALGS Pro League.

Genburten was unable to play in the Year 2 Split 2 Playoffs LAN tournament, due to COVID-19 regulations. Genburten tested multiple times for COVID-19 around the time of the tournament, and although he received one negative test, he would test positive on the first day of the tournament. Reignite were still able to win, though without Genburten and instead with British loan player "jmw".

On 4 July 2022, Genburten left Reignite, along with Sharky and Zer0.

=== DarkZero ===
After leaving Reignite, the trio signed with the American organization DarkZero Esports. The team won the 2022 ALGS Championship LAN, held in Raleigh, North Carolina. Sharky would then leave the team, with Rody "Xynew" Geissle filling the roster spot. Genburten and DarkZero won the 2023 ALGS Split 2 Playoffs. With the victory, Genburten and Zer0 became the only 3-time LAN championship winners in ALGS history. Following the 2023 ALGS Championship, Genburten played trial matches with Sweetdreams and Nafen, but ultimately decided to remain with DarkZero.

During the Year 4 North American Pro League regional finals, Genburten was one of two players to be affected by hacks. Genburten received a "wallhack", revealing the location of other players through walls and terrain. As the match was occurring on a private lobby during a high-profile match, the hack was considered unprecedented by media outlets. NME noted that Genburten quickly alerted his teammates and left the match, "presumably to avoid some sort of penalty for cheating in an official tournament match". Genburten detailed that he left after his teammate "Sikezz" suggested to and also stated that he feared his "career was over" because of the incident. With its competitive integrity compromised, the competition was postponed and held at a later date in secret, with Genburten and DarkZero placing in sixth.

In May, at the 2024 Split 1 Playoffs LAN, Genburten and DarkZero finished in second, runner-ups to Reject Winnity.

=== Team Falcons ===
Shortly following the 2024 Split 1 Playoffs LAN tournament, it was announced that Zer0 and Genburten would be leaving DarkZero. They joined forces with Phillip "ImperialHal" Dosen to form a "superteam" for the Split 2 season. It was initially unclear if the three would play under the DZ banner, though on 28 May, it was announced that the trio signed under the Saudi organization Team Falcons. The org is believed to have connections to the Al-Saud royal family. The three played together at the Apex Legends tournament during the 2024 Esports World Cup. Falcons had a disappointing 20th-place finish at the 2024 Split 2 Playoffs LAN. Following this, Genburten announced his departure from Falcons and that he would be joining iiTzTimmy and Dezignful on another squad. It is unclear if Genburten opted to leave Falcons on his own terms or if the team dropped him.

=== The Dojo ===
After leaving Falcons, Genburten became a member of The Dojo, joining the squad's previous members iiTzTimmy and Dezignful.

=== 100 Thieves / Crazy Thieves ===
On 12 November 2024, it was announced that The Dojo roster had been signed by 100 Thieves, marking the org's return to Apex Legends.

== Player profile ==
Genburten serves as his team's fragger, with the role expected to provide a considerable amount of a team's kills and damage. Indeed, Genburten has been noted to record high amounts of both at competitive tournaments.

Apex players choose between mouse and keyboard or controller inputs; Genburten plays on the latter, being considered by video game media outlets one of the best controller players in the sport. As he plays on controller, Genburten has been noted to experiment with the input's sensitivity settings. Genburten has dealt with accusations of cheating throughout his career, which he has stated have been persistent.
