= PUBG Mobile World Cup 2024 =

Electronic sports tournament

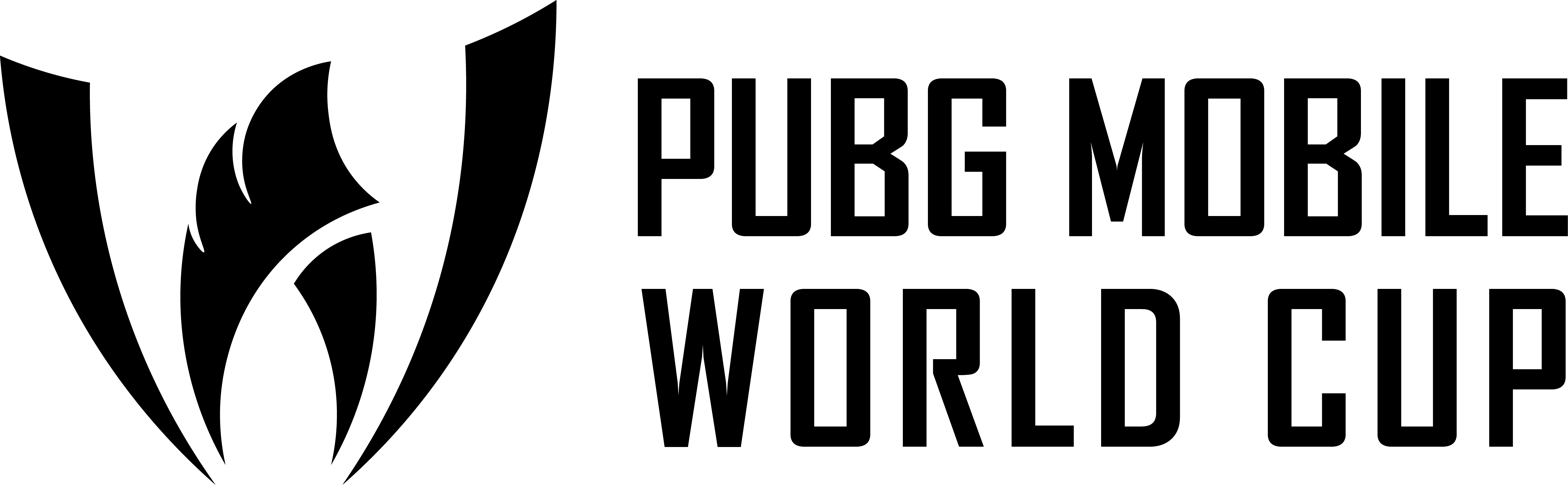

Tournament information
- Game: PUBG Mobile
- Dates: 19–28 July 2024
- Administrator: Level Infinite, Krafton, Esports World Cup
- Tournament format: Battle Royale
- Host(s): Riyadh, Saudi Arabia
- Participants: 28 teams
- Purse: $3,050,000
- Website: esportsworldcup.com/pmwc

Final positions
- Champion: (Brazil) Alpha7 Esports
- 1st runner-up: (Japan) Reject
- 2nd runner-up: (China) Tianba
- MVP: (Japan) Reiji "Reiji" Maeda (Reject)

The PUBG Mobile World Cup 2024 was the official mid-seasonal world tournament for PUBG Mobile (and its variants) organized by Level Infinite & Krafton. It was held from 19 to 28 July 2024, as part of the 2024 Esports World Cup.

Brazil's Alpha7 Esports won the tournament.

== Background ==
In October 2023, it was announced at the New Global Sport Conference that the Gamers8 esports festival, organized by the Saudi Esports Federation, would be "upgraded" to the Esports World Cup, held during the summer of 2024. In March 2024, it was announced that the PUBG Mobile mid-seasonal tournament, officially known as the PUBG Mobile World Cup would be included in the games line-up, with the official format revealed in March 2024.

The PUBG Mobile World Invitational (abbreviated PMWI), which preceded the PUBG Mobile World Cup, was held beginning in 2021, initially for the Saudi Esports Federation's "Gamers Without Borders" series. While the initial tournament was split to East and West divisions, it would become one tournament beginning in 2022, alongside the establishment of Gamers8.

The PMWC 2024 featured 28 teams and a total prize pool of US$3,000,000. The champion would also win an extra slot for their region in the PUBG Mobile Global Championship 2024 held in the United Kingdom.

== Calendar ==
Here are the competitions dates of PUBG Mobile World Cup 2024:

●	Competitions days

July 2024	July													
July 2024	Week 3							Week 4						
July 2024	15	16	17	18	19	20	21	22	23	24	25	26	27	28
PUBG Mobile					●	●	●		●	●		●	●	●

== Venue ==
PUBG Mobile World Cup 2024 was announced to be held in Riyadh, Saudi Arabia. The PUBG Mobile event was held at the BR Arena of Boulevard City, also known as the stc Arena for sponsorship purposes.

Riyadh, Saudi Arabia
Boulevard City stc Arena
PUBG Mobile World Cup 2024 is located in Saudi Arabia

== Qualified Teams ==
=== Group Stage ===
Region	Event	Qualification method	Team name	Group
Southeast Asia	Special Invite		(Thailand) Vampire Esports	Green
Southeast Asia	PMSL SEA	PMSL SEA Summer 2024 Champion	(Indonesia) BOOM Esports	Yellow
Southeast Asia	PMSL SEA	PMSL SEA Summer 2024 Runner-up	(Vietnam) D'Xavier	Red
Southeast Asia	PMSL SEA	PMSL SEA Summer 2024 3rd place	(Malaysia) Yoodo Alliance	Red
Southeast Asia	PMSL SEA	PMSL SEA Summer 2024 4th place	(Indonesia) Talon Esports	Green
Southeast Asia	PMCL SEA	PMCL SEA Summer 2024 Champion	(Philippines) Harame Bro	Green
Europe, Middle East & Africa	PMSL EMEA	PMSL EMEA Spring 2024 Highest-Ranking Saudi Team	(Saudi Arabia) POWR Esports	Yellow
Europe, Middle East & Africa	PMSL EMEA	PMSL EMEA Spring 2024 Champion	(Bahrain) Brute Force	Red
Europe, Middle East & Africa	PMSL EMEA	PMSL EMEA Spring 2024 Runner-up	(Turkey) IW NRX	Yellow
Europe, Middle East & Africa	PMSL EMEA	PMSL EMEA Spring 2024 3rd place	(Turkey) Beşiktaş Black	Red
Europe, Middle East & Africa	PMSL EMEA	PMSL EMEA Spring 2024 4th place	(European Union) Money Makers	Yellow
South Asia & Central Asia	PMSL CSA	PMSL CSA Spring 2024 Champion	(Mongolia) 4Merical Vibes	Red
South Asia & Central Asia	PMSL CSA	PMSL CSA Spring 2024 Runner-up	(Mongolia) Falcons Force	Green
South Asia & Central Asia	PMSL CSA	PMSL CSA Spring 2024 3rd place	(Commonwealth of Independent States) MadBulls	Green
South Asia & Central Asia	PMSL CSA	PMSL CSA Spring 2024 4th place	(Mongolia) Al Ula x IHC Esports (Note: Team qualified as IHC Esports, but they entered a partnership with Saudi 3rd tier football club Al Ula FC on July 17.)	Green
Americas	PMSL Americas	PMSL Americas Spring 2024 Champion	(Brazil) Team Liquid	Green
Americas	PMSL Americas	PMSL Americas Spring 2024 Runner-up	(Brazil) Alpha7 Esports	Yellow
Americas	PMSL Americas	PMSL Americas Spring 2024 3rd place	(Brazil) iNCO Gaming	Yellow
China	Peacekeeper Elite League	PEL Spring 2024 Champion	(China) Tianba	Red
China	Peacekeeper Elite League	#1 PEL 2024 - PMWC Points	(China) TJB Esports	Green
South Korea & Japan	PMGO	PMGO 2024 Champion	(Japan) Reject	Red
South Korea & Japan	PMPS Korea	PMPS 2024 S1 Champion	(South Korea) DRX	Yellow
South Korea & Japan	PMJL	PMJL S4 P1 Champion	(Japan) CAG OSAKA	Yellow
South Korea & Japan	Rivals Cup	Rivals Cup Spring 2024 Champion	(South Korea) Dplus KIA	Red

=== Survival Stage ===
Region	Event	Qualification method	Team name
Southeast Asia	PMSL SEA	PMAL SEA Summer 2024 5th place	(Indonesia) Team Pandum
Europe, Middle East & Africa	PMSL EMEA	PMSL EMEA Spring 2024 5th place	(Russia) Team Spirit
South Asia & Central Asia	PMSL CSA	PMSL CSA Spring 2024 5th place	(Commonwealth of Independent States) RUKH eSports
Americas	PMSL Americas	PMSL Americas 2024 4th place	(Brazil) Twisted Minds

== Qualified Roster ==
=== Group Stage ===
Team name	Short Name	Region	Players					Coach
(Thailand) Vampire Esports	VPE	SEA	(Thailand) TonyK (Nattawut Muensa)	(Thailand) Stoned (Purin Rongkhankaew)	(Thailand) SchwepXz (Supachai Singkaew)	(Thailand) nOOzy (Sikarin Nopparat)	(Thailand) Fluketh (Natchaphon Somtus)	(Thailand) SIRTANNY (Chanatip Rinla)
(Indonesia) BOOM Esports	BOOM	SEA	(Indonesia) Reizy (Rendy Dwi Krisna Putra)	(Indonesia) Ponbit (Teuku Muhammad Kausar)	(Indonesia) Yummy (Fazriel Haikal Aditya)	(Indonesia) Frentzy (Excel Tio Ananta)	(Indonesia) Flyboy (Dhika Fadiano)	-
(Vietnam) D'Xavier	DX	SEA	(Vietnam) Lamborghini (Vũ Hoàng Hưng)	(Vietnam) ParaJin (Nguyễn Đình Chiến)	(Vietnam) ShaDows (Phan Văn Đông)	(Vietnam) NadeTii (Phạm Phước Trường)	(Vietnam) ChuaCoong (Ngô Đình Quang Anh)	-
(Malaysia) Yoodo Alliance	YALL	SEA	(Malaysia) kLuq (Luqman Hakim Hasan)	(Malaysia) Jimmy (Muhd Hazim Irfan Kamarudin)	(Malaysia) Oliyo (Mohamad Azli Amran)	(Malaysia) Flax (Muhammad Farish Husaini)	(Indonesia) LeonDZ (Leon Dzuliansyah)	-
(Indonesia) Talon Esports	TLN	SEA	(Indonesia) Misery (Alvin Sahri Ramadhan)	(Indonesia) RedFace (Eksa Rachman Jayanto)	(Indonesia) Linixx (Marchellino Rivael Rarobong)	(Indonesia) Axel (Nicholas Axel Teja)	(Indonesia) Yoru (Gilang Muhamad)	-
(Philippines) Harame Bro	BRO	SEA	(Philippines) Range (Francis Carl Fusingan)	(Philippines) Federales (Francis Carl Fusingan)	(Philippines) Emas (Francis Carl Fusingan)	(Philippines) Jappy	(Philippines) Phew (Francis Carl Fusingan)	-
(Saudi Arabia) POWR Esports	POWR	EMEA	(Iraq) ALHAJE (Ahmed Mohamed Al Hasnawi)	(Saudi Arabia) EASY (Bander Alqahtani)	(Saudi Arabia) Kante (Mayzad Alhumaidi Almutairi)	(Saudi Arabia) Fhidan (Fahad Zarraq Almutairi)	(Syria) SaTaN (Hamza Alzoubi)	(Morocco) Joyboy (Issam Fadili)
(Bahrain) Brute Force	BF	EMEA	(Bahrain) PREPOD (Andrey Lagunov)	(Bahrain) NEOZ (Daniil Kolbyshev)	(Bahrain) 4YDO (Andrey Ilin)	(Bahrain) FR1Z3R (Ruslan Gasanov)	(Russia) NALSON (Roman Miasnikov)	(Iraq) HixYE (Maad Ali Ashkar)
(Turkey) IW NRX	IWNRX	EMEA	(Turkey) Swain (Fehmi Seniçeli)	(Turkey) Zwolf (Ali Berkan Alkılınç)	(Turkey) FrozeNNX (Ahmet Erdem Erdoğdu)	(Turkey) Kein (Burak Çoruk)	(Turkey) ASG (Askeri Gökçe)	(Turkey) Bluffist (Aral Karaoğlanyan)
(Turkey) Beşiktaş Black	BJK	EMEA	(Turkey) Tospik (Okan Gökgöz)	(Turkey) Lewis (Eser Çalışkan)	(Turkey) Poser (Anıl Yılmaz)	(Turkey) Kircali (Kadir Kırcalı)	(Turkey) 7Jusuf (Yusuf Karahasan)	
(European Union) Money Makers	MM	EMEA	(Ukraine) OldBoy (Dmytro Bui)	(Bulgaria) ICY (Daniel Nikolaev Ninov)	(Serbia) Coa77 (Aleksandar Cvijanović)	(Serbia) BISKE (Vladimir Biševac)	(Ukraine) Havlik (Denys Havlicek)	(Ukraine) Bamb1ni (Dima Kuzmenko)
(Mongolia) 4Merical Vibes	4MV	CSA	(Mongolia) DOK (Uuganbayar Dulguun)	(Mongolia) APEX (Bat-erdene Orgil-erdene)	(Mongolia) BARON (Davaajargal Naranbaatar)	(Mongolia) REFUS (Amgalan Ankhbileg)	(Mongolia) AERO (Bayart Bolormaa)	(Mongolia) Archer (Red Lmnto)
(Mongolia) Falcons Force	FLCN	CSA	(Mongolia) TOP (Burenbayar Altangerel)	(Mongolia) Action (Suhbat Galtsalam)	(Mongolia) N1RZED (Nur Zed)	(Mongolia) ICY (Tengis Batnasan)	(Mongolia) EAST (Batmunkh Munkhbold)	(Mongolia) Senator (Batkhurel Jargalsaihan)
(Commonwealth of Independent States) MadBulls	MAD	CSA	(Kyrgyzstan) TUL1KA (Andriy Tulika)	(Kyrgyzstan) ZERYCH (Baitur Kurmanbekov)	(Ukraine) FLYQE (Diyar Osmonov)	(Russia) INGUSH (Dzhambulat Ozdoev)	(Russia) GIRYA (Dmitriy Pismenskiy)	
(Mongolia) Al Ula x IHC Esports	ULA	CSA	(Mongolia) Zyol (Zolboot Bayartsengel)	(Mongolia) Godless (Bilguun Baatarkhuu)	(Mongolia) ROGUE	(Mongolia) DEMO (Batbagana Batkhuyag)	(Mongolia) Alex (Khuselbaatar Khatanbaatar)	(Mongolia) Abely (Dulaanjargal Nyamlkhagva)
(Brazil) Team Liquid	TL	AM	(Brazil) Cardozin (Davi Filipe Dórea Cardoso)	(Brazil) Mythic (Matheus Moitinho Arantes)	(Argentina) Ayala (Gonzalo Ayala)	(Brazil) Chieff (Anderson Rocha Nunes)	(Brazil) NighTT (Otávio Melo)	
(Brazil) Alpha7 Esports	A7	AM	(Brazil) Carrilho (Lucas Miguel da Silva Carrilho)	(Brazil) Revo (Roan Henrique Aléssio)	(Brazil) Mafioso (Daniel Henrique vaz)	(Brazil) Magrelin (Jean Carlos Gomes Filho)	(Brazil) Coruja (Erick de Alcantara)	
(Brazil) iNCO Gaming	iNCO	AM	(Brazil) NENEBETE (Derci Júnior de Cristo)	(Brazil) Vitali (João Felipe)	(Brazil) Nunes (José Leandro Bezerra de Melo)	(Brazil) Sev7n (Flavio Brito)	(Brazil) Garryx (Matheus Ribeiro Oliveira)	(Brazil) Fusi (Wagner Sousa)
(China) Tianba	Tian	China	(China) Lyu (Liu Jinshan)	(China) Qzz (Zhang Qingbo)	(China) GGBond (Zeng Jinxiang)	(China) Long	(China) Tianyu (Zhang Tianyu)	-
(China) TJB Esports	TJB	China	(China) Loongz (Xiao Haitao)	(China) FlowerH (Chen Yumeng)	(China) OnlyS (Liu Yang)	(China) GK1st (Wei Jiawang)	(China) SSS (Wu Changtao)	-
(Japan) Reject	RC	KRJP	(Japan) SaRa (Kento Suzuki)	(Japan) Reiji (Reiji Maeda)	(Japan) Duelo (Yuya Nishikawa)	(Japan) Devine (Kouki Sekigawa)	-	(Japan) MimoriN (Taiki Mochizuki)
(South Korea) DRX	DRX	KRJP	(South Korea) Qx (Lee Kyung-seok)	(South Korea) Cyxae (Choi Young-jae)	(South Korea) SOEZ (Song Ho-jin)	(South Korea) HYUNBIN (Jeon Hyun-bin)	(South Korea) MMING (Kim Sang-min)	
(Japan) CAG OSAKA	CAG	KRJP	(Japan) Apollo (Daisuke Ohashi)	(Japan) Garnet (Eigo Tagashira)	(Japan) Mattun (Riku Matsumoto)	(Japan) Naoto	-	-
(South Korea) Dplus KIA	DK	KRJP	(South Korea) OSAL (Go Han-bin)	(South Korea) Nolbu (Song Soo-an)	(South Korea) Kay (Lee Seul-woo)	(South Korea) chpz (Jung Yoo-chan)	(South Korea) Porico (Kim Si-hyun)	(South Korea) LLLL (Jung Eun-ho)
(South Korea) Dplus KIA	DK	KRJP	(South Korea) OSAL (Go Han-bin)	(South Korea) Nolbu (Song Soo-an)	(South Korea) Kay (Lee Seul-woo)	(South Korea) chpz (Jung Yoo-chan)	(South Korea) Porico (Kim Si-hyun)	(South Korea) FAVIAN (Park Sang-cheol)

=== Survival Stage ===
Team name	Short Name	Region	Players					Coach
(Indonesia) Team Pandum	PNDM	SEA	(Indonesia) Bilbot (Habibi Rizki Widodo)	(Indonesia) Acull (Sanju Yosua Sitinjak)	(Indonesia) Dimzy	(Indonesia) JooBrenky (Joshua Sepro)	(Indonesia) Tenn (Justen Kennith Filbert Setiawan)	(Indonesia) Dyns (Putra Anandyan)
(Russia) Team Spirit	TS	EMEA	(Russia) KITSUNÉ (Sergey Pomerantsev)	(Russia) KnowMe (Bulat Sharafutdinov)	(Russia) NAOMI (Anatoliy Ivanov)	(Kyrgyzstan) EFFECT (Bekniyaz Rysaliev)	-	-
(Commonwealth of Independent States) RUKH eSports	RUKH	CSA	(Russia) KippaBoss (George Kipper)	(Russia) YANKI (Kirill Pishchukhin)	(Ukraine) Slonik (Olexiy Totskiy)	(Russia) V1C (Ilya Artemyev)	-	-
(Brazil) Twisted Minds	TWIS	AM	(Brazil) Higor (Higor Melo Germendorff)	(Brazil) Obscure (Lucas Almeida Luis)	(Brazil) Ratoboy (Gabriel Almeida da Silva)	(Brazil) Guizão (Guilherme Costa Alves)	(Brazil) Trash (Caio Henrique Assunção)	(Brazil) Dadinho (Michael Barboza De Queiroz Francisco)
(Brazil) Twisted Minds	TWIS	AM	(Brazil) Higor (Higor Melo Germendorff)	(Brazil) Obscure (Lucas Almeida Luis)	(Brazil) Ratoboy (Gabriel Almeida da Silva)	(Brazil) Guizão (Guilherme Costa Alves)	(Brazil) Trash (Caio Henrique Assunção)	(Brazil) Lendinha

== Format ==
Here is the format of PUBG Mobile World Cup 2024:

In the group stage, the three groups, consisting of eight teams each (a total of 24 teams), will compete against each other. The top 12 teams from the group stage will advance to the main tournament. The remaining 12 teams will advance to the survival stage. In the survival stage, the bottom 12 teams from Group Stage, along with 4 wildcard teams (a total of 16 teams), will compete against each other. The top four teams from the survival stage will advance to the main tournament. The top 12 teams from the group stage, along with the top 4 teams from the survival stage (a total of 16 teams), will compete in the main tournament.

== Schedule ==
Here is the schedule of PUBG Mobile World Cup 2024:

Round	Date	Teams
Group Stage	19 July 2024	Group Red vs Yellow
Group Stage	20 July 2024	Group Red vs Green
Group Stage	21 July 2024	Group Green vs Yellow
Survival Stage	23 July 2024	Bottom 12 teams from Group Stage + 4 wildcard teams
Survival Stage	24 July 2024	Bottom 12 teams from Group Stage + 4 wildcard teams
Main Tournament	26 July 2024	Top 12 teams from Group Stage + Top 4 teams from Survival Stage
Main Tournament	27 July 2024	Top 12 teams from Group Stage + Top 4 teams from Survival Stage
Main Tournament	28 July 2024	Top 12 teams from Group Stage + Top 4 teams from Survival Stage

== Group Stage ==
=== Group Draw ===
Here are the group draw of PUBG Mobile World Cup 2024:

Group Red	Group Green	Group Yellow
Brute Force	Team Liquid	BOOM Esports
Tianba	Harame Bro	CAG OSAKA
4Merical Vibes	Vampire Esports	DRX
Reject	TJB Esports	IW NRX
Dplus KIA	Falcons Force	Alpha7 Esports
D'Xavier	MadBulls	iNCO Gaming
Beşiktaş Black	Al Ula x IHC Esports	Money Makers
Yoodo Alliance	Talon Esports	POWR Esports

=== Group Stage standings ===
Here are the standings of the Group Stage of PUBG Mobile World Cup 2024:

Rank	Team	WWCD	Placement	Elims	Total points	Qualification
1	(Malaysia) Yoodo Alliance	3	43	79	122	Advance to the Main Tournament
2	(China) Tianba	0	29	77	106	Advance to the Main Tournament
3	(Mongolia) 4Merical Vibes	2	29	65	94	Advance to the Main Tournament
4	(Brazil) Team Liquid	2	37	54	91	Advance to the Main Tournament
5	(Brazil) Alpha7 Esports	1	34	57	91	Advance to the Main Tournament
6	(Mongolia) Al Ula x IHC Esports	1	30	54	84	Advance to the Main Tournament
7	(Vietnam) D'Xavier	1	39	43	82	Advance to the Main Tournament
8	(Indonesia) Talon Esports	0	21	59	80	Advance to the Main Tournament
9	(Saudi Arabia) POWR Esports	2	33	46	79	Advance to the Main Tournament
10	(Indonesia) BOOM Esports	1	25	51	76	Advance to the Main Tournament
11	(Thailand) Vampire Esports	0	28	42	70	Advance to the Main Tournament
12	(Japan) Reject	0	20	49	69	Advance to the Main Tournament
13	(Brazil) iNCO Gaming	1	28	38	66	Advance to the Survival Stage
14	(South Korea) Dplus KIA	1	14	49	63	Advance to the Survival Stage
15	(Commonwealth of Independent States) MadBulls	0	22	38	60	Advance to the Survival Stage
16	(Mongolia) Falcons Force	0	15	45	60	Advance to the Survival Stage
17	(China) TJB Esports	1	24	32	56	Advance to the Survival Stage
18	(Turkey) Beşiktaş Black	1	25	30	55	Advance to the Survival Stage
19	(Bahrain) Brute Force	0	21	32	53	Advance to the Survival Stage
20	(European Union) Money Makers	1	14	37	51	Advance to the Survival Stage
21	(Philippines) Harame Bro	0	13	29	42	Advance to the Survival Stage
22	(Turkey) IW NRX	0	13	29	42	Advance to the Survival Stage
23	(Japan) CAG OSAKA	0	12	19	31	Advance to the Survival Stage
24	(South Korea) DRX	0	5	18	23	Advance to the Survival Stage

== Survival Stage ==
=== Survival Stage standings ===
Here are the standings of the Survival Stage of PUBG Mobile World Cup 2024:

Rank	Team	WWCD	Placement	Elims	Total points	Qualification
1	(Turkey) IW NRX	2	48	74	122	Advance to the Main Tournament
2	(South Korea) DRX	3	41	52	93	Advance to the Main Tournament
3	(China) TJB Esports	1	33	48	81	Advance to the Main Tournament
4	(Brazil) Twisted Minds	1	32	48	80	Advance to the Main Tournament
5	(Mongolia) Falcons Force	1	21	56	77	Eliminated from the tournament
6	(South Korea) Dplus KIA	0	21	55	76	Eliminated from the tournament
7	(Bahrain) Brute Force	0	26	48	74	Eliminated from the tournament
8	(European Union) Money Makers	0	22	51	73	Eliminated from the tournament
9	(Indonesia) Team Pandum	1	19	53	72	Eliminated from the tournament
10	(Japan) CAG OSAKA	2	28	43	71	Eliminated from the tournament
11	(Commonwealth of Independent States) MadBulls	0	17	50	67	Eliminated from the tournament
12	(Philippines) Harame Bro	1	20	29	49	Eliminated from the tournament
13	(Turkey) Beşiktaş Black	0	20	25	45	Eliminated from the tournament
14	(Commonwealth of Independent States) RUKH eSports	0	9	33	42	Eliminated from the tournament
15	(Russia) Team Spirit	0	12	27	39	Eliminated from the tournament
16	(Brazil) iNCO Gaming	0	15	23	38	Eliminated from the tournament

== Main Tournament ==
=== Main Tournament standings ===
Here are the standings of the Main Tournament of PUBG Mobile World Cup 2024:

Rank	Team	WWCD	Placement	Elims	Total points
1	(Brazil) Alpha7 Esports	5	71	82	153
2	(Japan) Reject	2	40	84	124
3	(China) Tianba	0	27	97	124
4	(South Korea) DRX	1	48	63	111
5	(Indonesia) BOOM Esports	2	38	70	108
6	(Indonesia) Talon Esports	1	33	73	106
7	(Thailand) Vampire Esports	1	45	59	104
8	(Brazil) Team Liquid	1	35	66	101
9	(Vietnam) D'Xavier	1	38	59	97
10	(China) TJB Esports	1	41	53	94
11	(Mongolia) Al Ula x IHC Esports	1	35	58	93
12	(Mongolia) 4Merical Vibes	0	27	63	90
13	(Brazil) Twisted Minds	1	28	60	88
14	(Turkey) IW NRX	0	20	65	85
15	(Malaysia) Yoodo Alliance	1	32	50	82
16	(Saudi Arabia) POWR Esports	0	18	47	65

== Final standings ==
Like with the PUBG Mobile World Invitational at Gamers8, the PUBG Mobile World Cup's $3,000,000 USD prizepool (tied with Honor of Kings and MLBB Men) is divided into separate categories. Each team will earn prizemoney based on how well they did in the Group Stage, Survival Stage and Main Tournament. The tournament's MVP earns $50,000 USD. Additionally, all teams and players can earn an additional $120,000 USD via the Record-Breaker Awards if they break a previous PUBG Mobile World Invitational record at the tournament; if these records are not broken, the prize money is split evenly between the 16 teams in the Main Tournament. The maximum amount of money a team may earn is $550,000 USD (if they finish first in the Group Stage, win the Main Tournament and break all team records), while the maximum an individual player may earn is $90,000 USD (if they win MVP and break all player records).

Final standings, EWC Club Championship points distribution, and prizepool of $3,000,000 USD distribution are as seen as below:

Final Placement	Team Name	Short Name	Total Prize Pool	EWC Club Points	Group Stage		Survival Stage		Main Tournament	
Final Placement	Team Name	Short Name	Total Prize Pool	EWC Club Points	Placement	Prize Pool	Placement	Prize Pool	Placement	Prize Pool
Champion	(Brazil) Alpha7 Esports	A7	$492,312.50	1,000	5th	$62,500	-	-	1st	$400,000
Runner-up	(Japan) Reject	RC	$259,312.50	600	12th	$54,000	-	-	2nd	$200,000
3rd	(China) Tianba	Tian	$212,312.50	350	2nd	$67,000	-	-	3rd	$140,000
4th	(South Korea) DRX	DRX	$162,312.50	200	24th	$20,000	2nd	$27,000	4th	$110,000
5th	(Indonesia) BOOM Esports	BOOM	$151,312.50	110	10th	$56,000	-	-	5th	$90,000
6th	(Indonesia) Talon Esports	TLN	$143,312.50	70	8th	$58,000	-	-	6th	$80,000
7th	(Thailand) Vampire Esports	VPE	$151,312.50	40	11th	$55,000	-	-	7th	$75,000
8th	(Brazil) Team Liquid	TL	$143,312.50	20	4th	$63,500	-	-	8th	$65,000
9th	(Vietnam) D'Xavier	DX	$124,312.50	-	7th	$59,000	-	-	9th	$60,000
10th	(China) TJB Esports	TJB	$110,312.50	-	17th	$23,500	3rd	$26,500	10th	$55,000
11th	(Mongolia) Al Ula x IHC Esports	ULA	$115,812.50	-	6th	$60,500	-	-	11th	$50,000
12th	(Mongolia) 4Merical Vibes	4MV	$115,312.50	-	3rd	$65,000	-	-	12th	$45,000
13th	(Brazil) Twisted Minds	TWIS	$71,312.50	-	-	-	4th	$26,000	13th	$40,000
14th	(Turkey) IW NRX	IWNRX	$88,812.50	-	22nd	$21,000	1st	$27,500	14th	$35,000
15th	(Malaysia) Yoodo Alliance	YALL	$105,312.50	-	1st	$70,000	-	-	15th	$30,000
16th	(Saudi Arabia) POWR Esports	POWR	$87,312.50	-	9th	$57,000	-	-	16th	$25,000
17th	(Mongolia) Falcons Force	FLCN	$49,500	-	16th	$24,000	5th	$25,500	-	-
18th	(South Korea) Dplus KIA	DK	$50,000	-	14th	$25,000	6th	$25,000	-	-
19th	(Bahrain) Brute Force	BF	$47,000	-	19th	$22,500	7th	$24,500	-	-
20th	(European Union) Money Makers	MM	$46,000	-	20th	$22,000	8th	$24,000	-	-
21st	(Indonesia) Team Pandum	PNDM	$23,500	-	-	-	9th	$23,500	-	-
22nd	(Japan) CAG OSAKA	CAG	$43,500	-	23rd	$20,500	10th	$23,000	-	-
23rd	(Commonwealth of Independent States) MadBulls	MAD	$47,000	-	15th	$24,500	11th	$22,500	-	-
24th	(Philippines) Harame Bro	BRO	$43,500	-	21st	$21,500	12th	$22,000	-	-
25th	(Turkey) Beşiktaş Black	BJK	$44,500	-	18th	$23,000	13th	$21,500	-	-
26th	(Commonwealth of Independent States) RUKH eSports	RUKH	$21,500	-	-	-	14th	$21,000	-	-
27th	(Russia) Team Spirit	TS	$20,500	-	-	-	15th	$20,500	-	-
28th	(Brazil) iNCO Gaming	iNCO	$45,500	-	13th	$25,000	16th	$20,000	-	-

*Each team participating in the Main Tournament received an additional $5,312.50 USD from the unbroken records.

=== Base Prize Distribution ===
Here are the Base Prize Distribution of PUBG Mobile World Cup 2024:

Group Stage Total: $1,000,000 USD
Place	Prize (in USD)	Place	Prize (in USD)	Place	Prize (in USD)
1st	$70,000	9th	$57,000	17th	$23,500
2nd	$67,000	10th	$56,000	18th	$23,000
3rd	$65,000	11th	$55,000	19th	$22,500
4th	$63,500	12th	$54,000	20th	$22,000
5th	$62,500	13th	$25,500	21st	$21,500
6th	$60,500	14th	$25,000	22nd	$21,000
7th	$59,000	15th	$24,500	23rd	$20,500
8th	$58,000	16th	$24,000	24th	$20,000

Survival Stage Total: $380,000 USD
Place	Prize (in USD)	Place	Prize (in USD)
1st	$27,500	9th	$23,500
2nd	$27,000	10th	$23,000
3rd	$26,500	11th	$22,500
4th	$26,000	12th	$22,000
5th	$25,500	13th	$21,500
6th	$25,000	14th	$21,000
7th	$24,500	15th	$20,500
8th	$24,000	16th	$20,000

Main Tournament Total: $1,500,000 USD
Place	Prize (in USD)	Place	Prize (in USD)
1st	$400,000	9th	$60,000
2nd	$200,000	10th	$55,000
3rd	$140,000	11th	$50,000
4th	$110,000	12th	$45,000
5th	$90,000	13th	$40,000
6th	$80,000	14th	$35,000
7th	$75,000	15th	$30,000
8th	$65,000	16th	$25,000

=== Awards ===
Award name	Prize (in USD)	Participant
MVP	$50,000	(Japan) Reiji (RC)
Gunslinger	-	(Brazil) Mafioso (A7)
Grenade Master	-	(Brazil) Revo (A7)
Field Medic	-	(Indonesia) Frentzy (BOOM)

Award name	Participant
Infinix Dream Squad	(Japan) Reiji (RC)
Infinix Dream Squad	(China) Qzz (Tian)
Infinix Dream Squad	(Brazil) Mafioso (A7)
Infinix Dream Squad	(Brazil) Revo (A7)

Record-Breaker Awards
Award name	Prize (in USD)	Previous Record Holder		2024 Record Breaker	
(Team) Total WWCDs	$25,000	(Thailand) Vampire Esports (2023)	4	(Brazil) Alpha7 Esports	5
(Team) Most WWCDs in a Day	$25,000	(Thailand) Vampire Esports (2022, 2023) (China) Tianba (2023) (China) Regans Gaming (2022)	2	Not broken. $1,562.50 are awarded to each Main Tournament team.	
(Team) Most Top 3 Finishes	$15,000	(Thailand) Vampire Esports (2023)	10	Not broken. $937.50 are awarded to each Main Tournament team.	
(Team) Most Match Eliminations	$15,000	(Thailand) Vampire Esports (2022)	24	Not broken. $937.50 are awarded to each Main Tournament team.	
(Player) Most Match Eliminations	$10,000	(China) YuYang (SZ STE, 2023)	9	Not broken. $625 are awarded to each Main Tournament team.	
(Player) Total Eliminations	$10,000	(Thailand) TonyK (VPE, 2023)	53	Not broken. $625 are awarded to each Main Tournament team.	
(Player) Total Rescues	$10,000	(Thailand) SchwepXz (VPE, 2023)	18	Not broken. $625 are awarded to each Main Tournament team.	
(Player) Longest Distance Elimination	$10,000	(Vietnam) TDuc (BOX, 2023)	398m	(Mongolia) REFUS (4MV)	420m
