= Zer0 =

Australian professional Apex Legends player

Personal information
- Name: Rhys Perry
- Born: 29 June
- Nationality: Australian

Current team
- Team: Team Liquid
- Game: Apex Legends

Career information
- Playing career: 2019–present

Team history
- 2020: EXO Clan
- 2021–2022: Reignite South / Reignite (Note: In 2021, Reignite South was renamed Reignite after Reignite North was disbanded.)
- 2022–2024: DarkZero Esports
- 2024–2025: Team Falcons
- 2025–present: Team Liquid

Career highlights and awards
- ALGS Champion (2022); 2× ALGS Split Playoffs winner (2022 Split 2, 2023 Split 2); 2× Monster MVP (2022 Split 2, 2023 Split 2); 2× ALGS Pro League – APAC South region winner (2021 Split 1, 2022 Split 2); 2× ALGS Pro League – NA region winner (2024 Split 1, 2024 Split 2)

Twitch information
- Channel: zer0
- Followers: 108K
- Last updated: 29 August 2024

Rhys Perry, better known by his online alias and gaming handle Zer0, is an Australian professional Apex Legends player currently playing for Team Liquid.

From Brisbane, Zer0 played professional Apex for DarkZero from 2022 to 2024 as their In-Game Leader (IGL), before moving to Team Falcons. Competing in the Apex Legends Global Series (ALGS), Zer0 is a three-time LAN winner, including winning the 2022 ALGS Championship.

== Apex Legends career ==
=== Early career and Reignite ===
In 2020, Zer0 played for EXO Clan, a British esports organization. With EXO, he won the Oceanic qualifier in 2021. After some time as a free agent, Zer0 was signed to the Reignite South, a Japanese organization, on 11 January 2021. The team would eventually be renamed Reignite after the org's Reignite North team disbanded. Under the Reignite banner, Zer0 played alongside fellow Australians Rick "Sharky" Wirth and Noyan "Genburten" Ozkose. The trio played in the APAC South region and would win the region's 2022 ALGS Pro League.

Zer0's Reignite also won the 2022 ALGS Split 2 Playoffs LAN, which was held in Stockholm. Playing without Genburten due to him testing positive for COVID-19, and instead with British loan player "jmw", their win was considered a surprise. Zer0 and jmw had never spoken to each other prior to the championship game. Zer0 was named the Monster MVP of the LAN. On 4 July 2022, the Zer0/Genburten/Sharky trio left Reignite.

=== DarkZero ===
After speaking for some time about eventually signing to an organization based in the North American region, Zer0 signed to Las Vegas-based DarkZero Esports. Sharky and Genburten also signed with DarkZero. The team won the 2022 ALGS Championship LAN, held in Raleigh, North Carolina.

Sharky would then leave the team, with Rody "Xynew" Geissle filling the roster spot. With Xynew, Zer0 and Genburten would win the 2023 ALGS Split 2 Playoffs. Upon winning their third LAN, Zer0 and Genburten became the only 3-time LAN championships in ALGS history. With the win, Zer0 was also awarded his second Monster MVP.

=== Team Falcons ===
DarkZero would finish the 2024 Split 1 Playoffs LAN as runner-ups to Reject Winnity of the APAC North region. Following this, it was announced that Zer0 and Genburten would be leaving DarkZero, and joining with Phillip "ImperialHal" Dosen, to form a "superteam" for the Split 2 season. Initially unclear if this would be under the DZ banner, it was announced on 28 May that the trio signed under the Saudi organization Team Falcons, which is believed to have connections to the Al-Saud royal family. Though ImperialHal served as an IGL for his previous team, he relinquished the role to Zer0 when they joined the Falcons roster. Zer0 and Falcons won the Split 2 NA Regional Pro League. The three played together at the 2024 Esports World Cup's Apex Legends tournament, placing second and winning the silver medal.

== Player profile ==
Zer0 served as the captain and IGL for DarkZero and Team Falcons during his time with the respective organizations. In his role, he makes call-outs for his teammates, with his calls being seen as particularly "aggressive" by spectators. Hannah Marie ZT of Dot Esports wrote that Zer0 is "famously detail-orientated and vocal". She also wrote that his "intense attention to detail and strict team control" are reasons why many followers of the esport consider him as the best IGL. He is also often noted for his high damage outputs and kill counts. Also writing for the publication, Justin-Ivan Labilles and Adam Snavely commended Zer0, stating he "stands as the prime example of how textbook Apex should be played, from ring rotations to identifying vulnerable targets and knowing when to fully commit to a fight."

Prior to his win at the Stockholm LAN, Zer0 stated that he had a reputation as a "match point choker", having never won in the APAC South region. Following his LAN success in 2022, Zer0 garnered a reputation for his Apex prowess, particularly as an IGL. Ben Sledge of TheGamer wrote that "adapting to losing star fragger Genburten and teaching your tactics to a newcomer during the competition shows a level of leadership that many Apex IGLs will never be able to match". Indeed, Zer0's reputation as an elite IGL has maintained and heading into the 2024 ALGS Split 1 Playoffs, he was considered one of the best IGLs in competitive Apex.

Sledge wrote that out of match contexts, Zer0 is "incredibly laid back [...] coming across as casual, confident, and a little cocksure." He is also one of the highest-earning Apex players, at one point being the highest-earning of all-time; he ranked fourth all-time after the 2023 ALGS Championship.

== Further viewing ==
- Zer0 is the new CEO? (ALGS Champs Interview). esports.gg. 7 September 2023 – via YouTube.
