= TWT =

TWT may refer to:

- Sanga-Sanga Airport (IATA code: TWT), an airport serving the general area of Bongao, the capital of the province of Tawi-Tawi in the Philippines
- Ted Williams Tunnel, the third highway tunnel under Boston Harbor in Boston
- Tekken World Tour, an esports circuit for the video game series Tekken
- Traveling-wave tube, a specialized vacuum tube that is used in electronics to amplify radio frequency signals in the microwave range
- The World Tonight, a Philippine late-night English-language newscast
- The World Tomorrow (magazine), a defunct American political magazine
- Tunisia World Television, a Tunisian television channel
- TwT, a variant of the emoticon UwU
- A shortening of Twitter or tweet.
