= Hanamichi (disambiguation) =

Hanamichi (花道) is a stage section used in Japanese kabuki theater.

Hanamichi may also refer to:

- Hanamichi (sumo), the two main east and west paths in sumo wrestling leading from the preparation rooms to the dohyō (ring)
- "Hanamichi", a 2025 song by @onefive from More Than Kawaii
- Hanamichi Sakuragi, the main protagonist of the sports manga Slam Dunk by Takehiko Inoue
