= Selkoe =

Selkoe is a surname. Notable people with the surname include:

- Dennis J. Selkoe (born 1943), American neurologist
- Greg Selkoe (fl. 1990s–2020s), American entrepreneur
