= More Than Kawaii =

2025 extended play by @onefive

EP by @onefive
- Released: March 26, 2025
- Genres: J-pop; hip-hop
- Length: 21:50
- Label: Avex Trax

@onefive chronology
Classy Crush (2024)	More Than Kawaii (2025)	Doh Yoh (2026)

Singles from More Than Kawaii
- 1. "Liar Liar" Released: January 15, 2025; 2. "Kawaii Kaiwai" Released: February 14, 2025

More Than Kawaii (stylized in lowercase) is the first extended play (EP) by the Japanese girl group @onefive. It was released on March 26, 2025, by the record label Avex Trax.

== Background and development ==
The members of @onefive would sometimes have conversations among themselves about how the word "kawaii", which means "cute" in Japanese, is prevalently used in Japanese society without much thought. They would often receive the compliment and wonder why Japanese people tend to only say "kawaii" when that singular expression cannot express the full extent of their charm as people. They questioned if people really meant it from their hearts when they used that word, and if they had forgotten the original excitement that the expression conveyed. Through such conversations, the members of @onefive came up with the theme for their first EP, which, as expressed in its title, is that they are more than kawaii.

The development of the EP began through meetings between the four members of @onefive and their staff about the meaning of the phrase "more than kawaii". The members were deeply involved in the production of the songs from scratch, which made them feel that More Than Kawaii particularly reflected their own thoughts and feelings more than any previous release. In addition to concepts and lyrics for the EP, member Kano Fujihira was involved as an assistant in the process of choreographing "Sit Down Please".

== Music and lyrics ==
=== Music ===
"Liar Liar" is musically described as an upbeat tune with a Japanese melody and heavy bass sound. "Kawaii Kaiwai" is a cute J-pop song reminiscent of Vocaloid music, in sharp contrast to its critical lyrics. "Sit Down Please" leans very heavily into hip-hop, more than previous releases by @onefive, and contains multiple beat switches. "Kāixīn Ressha 080" (開心列車080) is described as a party anthem song, while "Hanamichi" is a ballad song. "Tap!Tap!Tap!", a live-only song from 2022, was remixed by DJ Takeru John Otoguro (TJO), through changes such as increasing the beats per minute, and was released for the first time as "Tap!Tap!Tap! (TJO Remix)".

=== Lyrics ===
"Liar Liar", with lyrics such as "I'm more than kawaii", is intended to draw the attention of listeners towards the various sides of @onefive that are not only kawaii, i.e., not only cute. The song "Kawaii Kaiwai" declares that, contrary to the prevalent overuse of the word "kawaii" in Japanese society, "kawaii" alone cannot express the one-of-a-kind existence of the members of @onefive. The title of the song, which means "cute community", is the name that the members gave to those who are guilty of treating the word "kawaii" without care, and the song is aimed at them. The title of "Sit Down Please" uses wordplay as it sounds similar to "shiranpuri" (知らんぷり; 'feigning ignorance'), and its lyrics revolve around pushing ahead without worrying about negative opinions, especially from anti-fans. "Kāixīn Ressha 080" includes Chinese words in its title and lyrics to reflect how the members of @onefive had studied Chinese for their first international performance in Taiwan on December 31, 2024. The lyrics for "Hanamichi" were devised by the four members, and were then put into their final form by Yui Mugino.

== Promotion and release ==
On December 31, 2024, @onefive performed an unreleased song titled "Liar Liar" at the 2025 Tainan Hao Young New Year's Eve Party in Tainan City, Taiwan, in front of an audience with over 100,000 spectators. On January 1, 2025, New Year's Day, the group announced that it would be releasing music based on the theme of "more than kawaii" for three consecutive months, ending with the release of an EP titled More Than Kawaii in March 2025. The first release was the digital single "Liar Liar" on January 15, and the second was the digital single "Kawaii Kaiwai" on February 14. Throughout February and March, @onefive held several performances and partnered with various stores as one-day store managers to promote the upcoming EP and the More Than Kawaii spring tour. In March, each member of the group released a personal playlist on Spotify and Line Music with the theme of songs that are "more than kawaii" to promote the EP. More Than Kawaii was released digitally and as physical music download cards on March 26, 2025.

"Tap!Tap!Tap! (TJO Remix)" was featured in a commercial for the Japanese jewelry brand The Kiss on August 8, 2025, in which the four members also appeared. A Chinese language version of "Kawaii Kaiwai", titled "Miāo Miāo Xīntiào" (喵喵心跳, Meow Meow Heartbeat), was featured as the theme song for the mobile game Strinova on October 23, 2025, for which @onefive had been appointed as official ambassadors. The song would later appear on @onefive's second EP, Doh Yoh. In January 2026, Japanese rapper Tokyo Sekai made reference to "Kawaii Kaiwai" and @onefive in his song "Kōgeki" (口撃).

== Track listing ==
More Than Kawaii
No.	Title	Lyrics	Music	Length
1.	"Liar Liar" (らいあーらいあー)	Mayu Wakisaka	Koshin; Mayu Wakisaka	3:31
2.	"Kawaii Kaiwai"	Nanako Ashida	Nanako Ashida; Ryotaro Koga	3:17
3.	"Sit Down Please"	Nanako Ashida	Nanako Ashida; Ryotaro Koga; ShinQ	3:33
4.	"Kāixīn Ressha 080" (開心列車080)	J-Dash; Kayoko Matsudate; Zeyun	Zeyun	4:05
5.	"Hanamichi"	@onefive; Yui Mugino	Lee Dong Heon; Zeyun	4:22
6.	"Tap!Tap!Tap! (TJO Remix)"	Uni (Anddy Mule)	TJO; Zeyun	3:02
Total length:				21:50

== Personnel ==
- Kano Fujihira as Kano – vocals (all tracks), lyrics (track 5)
- Soyoka Yoshida as Soyo – vocals (all tracks), lyrics (track 5)
- Tsugumi Aritomo as Gumi – vocals (all tracks), lyrics (track 5)
- Momoe Mori as Momo – vocals (all tracks), lyrics (track 5)
- J-Dash – lyrics (track 4)
- Kayoko Matsudate – lyrics (track 4)
- Koshin – music (track 1)
- Lee Dong Heon – music (track 5)
- Mayu Wakisaka – lyrics (track 1), music (track 1)
- Nanako Ashida – lyrics (tracks 2, 3), music (tracks 2, 3)
- Ryotaro Koga – music (tracks 2, 3)
- ShinQ – music (track 3)
- TJO – music (track 6)
- Uni (Anddy Mule) – lyrics (track 6)
- Yui Mugino – lyrics (track 5)
- Zeyun – lyrics (track 4), music (tracks 4, 5, 6)
