= Atif Butt (gamer) =

Pakistani professional esports player

ATIF

Personal information
- Name: Atif Ijaz
- Nationality: Pakistani

Current team
- Team: Team Falcons

Career information
- Games: Tekken 7, Tekken 8
- Playing career: 2019–present

Career highlights and awards
- CEO 2025 Tekken 8 champion; Tekken World Tour Finals 2022 champion; Tokyo Tekken Masters 2019 winner

Atif Ijaz, known professionally as ATIF (Previously known as Atif Butt), is a Pakistani professional esports player who competes in the Tekken series representing Team Falcons. He won the CEO 2025 and placed first at Tekken World Tour Finals 2022 in the Tekken 8 and Tekken 7 divisions respectively.

== Career ==
Atif began competing professionally in 2019 and won the Tokyo Tekken Masters 2019 tournament using the character Akuma.

In 2022, he won the Tekken World Tour Finals, defeating South Korea's JeonDDing in the grand final.

At Combo Breaker 2025, held in Schaumburg, Illinois, Butt placed second, losing in the final to South Korea's Mulgold.

In June 2025, he won the CEO 2025 tournament in the Tekken 8 division, defeating South Korea's Ulsan 3–1 in the grand final.

In July 2024, Butt represented Pakistan alongside Arslan Ash and Khan at the Gamers8 Tekken Nations Cup, where the team won the event by defeating South Korea in the final.

== Playstyle ==
Atif has used a variety of characters in competitive play, including Dragunov, Akuma, and Anna Williams. His character selection has varied based on matchup considerations and tournament formats.

== Tournament results ==
=== Tekken 8 ===
- 1st – CEO 2025
- 2nd – Combo Breaker 2025
- 1st – FV Major 2024
- 2nd – EVO 2024

=== Tekken 7 ===
- 1st – World Esports Championship 2023
- 1st – Tekken World Tour Finals 2022
- 1st – Tokyo Tekken Masters 2019
