= Doh Yoh =

2026 extended play by @onefive

EP by @onefive
- Released: January 15, 2026
- Genres: J-pop; hip-hop
- Length: 20:30
- Label: Avex Trax

@onefive chronology
More Than Kawaii (2025)	Doh Yoh (2026)

Singles from Doh Yoh
- 1. "Alps Vibes" Released: August 1, 2025; 2. "Kibidango" Released: October 22, 2025; 3. "Magical Irony" Released: December 17, 2025

Doh Yoh (stylized in all caps) is the second extended play (EP) by the Japanese girl group @onefive. It was released on January 15, 2026, by the record label Avex Trax.

== Background and development ==
The title Doh Yoh is a stylized romanization of dōyō (童謡), which refers to Japanese children's songs that are well known across Japan. It describes the concept of the extended play, with half of the songs being reinterpretations of dōyō in the style of @onefive.

The members of @onefive were collaboratively involved in the development of the EP. They brainstormed and actively discussed their ideas and opinions with their creative personnel on matters such as cover art, music, and lyrics, in order for the songs to better represent their vision. For example, when they heard the initial demo track for "Magical Irony", they sent it back to producer Taku Takahashi, because it had too much noise and the lyrics were too negative. They also took lessons in Mandarin to sing the Chinese version of "Kawaii Kaiwai".

== Music and lyrics ==
=== Music ===
"Alps Vibes" reimagines the dōyō "Alps Ichiman Jaku" as an Afrobeat song. "Kibidango" reinterprets "Momotarō" in the style of kawaii hip-hop with a double bass riff. "Magical Irony" is a hyperpop song based on "Mori no Kuma-san" that features production by Taku Takahashi from the Japanese hip-hop group M-Flo. "Netsukikyū" (熱気球) is described as having a cute sound. "Urunemu" (うるねむ) is a party song intended for rhythmic towel spinning at live shows. "Kawaii Kaiwai" is a J-pop song reminiscent of Vocaloid music.

=== Lyrics ===
"Alps Vibes" represents the determination of @onefive to overcome challenges in pursuit of goals as high as the Alps. The lyrics of "Kibidango" are inspired by the Japanese folktale Momotarō and revolve around the motif of kneading kibi dango confections. "Magical Irony" depicts the irony between the magical joy of falling in love and the negative emotions that may result from it, such as anxiety and loneliness. It is written from the perspective of a mentally unstable girl who is driven by uncontrollable emotions after the person she loves, and contains gyaru-moji. "Netsukikyū" is about feelings of love that continue to rise higher and higher like a hot air balloon. "Urunemu" is named after @onefive's weekly radio show of the same name on FM Yokohama. The Chinese version of "Kawaii Kaiwai" is written in Mandarin and features lyrics that reflect the world of the Chinese video game Strinova as part of a collaboration. The original version of the song in Japanese was previously released on @onefive's first EP, More Than Kawaii.

== Promotion and release ==
The first single from Doh Yoh, "Alps Vibes", was released on August 1, 2025. It received significant attention from listeners in South America. The second single, "Kibidango", was released on October 22, 2025. The members of @onefive handed out a thousand pieces of kibi dango confections at an event to promote the song. On October 23, 2025, it was announced that @onefive had become ambassadors for the Chinese mobile game Strinova, and that a new Chinese language version of "Kawaii Kaiwai", titled "Miāo Miāo Xīntiào" (喵喵心跳, Meow Meow Heartbeat), had been recorded to be its official theme song. A music video was also released in which the members cosplay as characters from the game. The third single, "Magical Irony", was released on December 17, 2025. It entered the Billboard Japan Heatseekers Songs chart. Doh Yoh was released digitally and as physical music download cards on January 15, 2026. The Mexican music news website Revulsión gave the EP an 8/10, stating it is "a well-rounded EP from beginning to end" and "sonically optimal for the international ear". On January 30, 2026, a micro-drama was released for "Netsukikyū", featuring actor Robin Furuya and the members of @onefive.

== Track listing ==
Doh Yoh
No.	Title	Lyrics	Music	Length
1.	"Alps Vibes" (アルプス・バイブス)	Mayu Wakisaka	Koshin; Mayu Wakisaka	3:57
2.	"Kibidango"	Nanako Ashida	Nanako Ashida; Ryotaro Koga	3:09
3.	"Magical Irony" (マジカルアイロニー)	Kanata Okajima; Hayato Yamamoto	Taku Takahashi; Kanata Okajima; Hayato Yamamoto	3:30
4.	"Netsukikyū" (熱気球)	J-Dash; Lee Dong Heon; Zeyun	Lee Dong Heon; Zeyun	3:09
5.	"Urunemu" (うるねむ)	J-Dash; Zeyun	Zeyun	3:26
6.	"Kawaii Kaiwai Chinese Ver. 'Miāo Miāo Xīntiào'" (喵喵心跳)	J-Dash; Ju!ie	Nanako Ashida; Ryotaro Koga	3:19
Total length:				20:30

== Personnel ==
- Kano Fujihira as Kano – vocals (all tracks)
- Soyoka Yoshida as Soyo – vocals (all tracks)
- Tsugumi Aritomo as Gumi – vocals (all tracks)
- Momoe Mori as Momo – vocals (all tracks)
- Hayato Yamamoto – lyrics (track 3), music (track 3)
- J-Dash – lyrics (tracks 4, 5, 6)
- Ju!ie – lyrics (track 6)
- Kanata Okajima – lyrics (track 3), music (track 3)
- Koshin – music (track 1)
- Lee Dong Heon – lyrics (track 4), music (track 4)
- Mayu Wakisaka – lyrics (track 1), music (track 1)
- Nanako Ashida – lyrics (track 2), music (tracks 2, 6)
- Ryotaro Koga – music (tracks 2, 6)
- Taku Takahashi – music (track 3)
- Zeyun – lyrics (tracks 4, 5), music (tracks 4, 5)
