= 2024 Esports World Cup – Featuring Fortnite =

Fortnite tournament at the 2024 Esports World Cup

2024 Esports World Cup: Featuring Fortnite
Tournament information
- Sport: Fortnite (ESL Featuring Fortnite UEFN mode)
- Location: Saudi Arabia
- Dates: August 8–August 11
- Administrator: Esports World Cup Foundation; Supervised by ESL
- Tournament format(s): 16-team GSL-style group stage 8-team single elimination bracket
- Venue: 1 (in 1 host city)
- Teams: 16

Final positions
- Champion: XSET
- Runner-up: Exceed
- MVP: Ritual (XSET)

Fortnite had a tournament at the 2024 Esports World Cup, held in Riyadh, Saudi Arabia, between August 8 and 11, 2024. Sixteen teams took part in this tournament, six having qualified from a LAN tournament at DreamHack Dallas and ten qualifying from online qualifiers. Due to the tournament not being sponsored or sanctioned by Epic Games, the game's developer, the tournament is known as Esports World Cup: Featuring Fortnite. XSET won the tournament, beating Exceed in the Final.

This tournament utilized ESL Featuring Fortnite, a separate game made using Unreal Editor for Fortnite (UEFN) which operates like a team shooter in a manner similar to Call of Duty or Halo as opposed to Fortnite Battle Royale, which is used for the game's official esports circuit, the Fortnite Championship Series (FNCS).

== Background ==
Fortnite was officially announced as one of the games at the 2024 Esports World Cup on March 11, 2024. Epic Games, the game's developer, opted not to associate itself with the game's tournament, as they sanction the Fortnite Championship Series (FNCS), which is officially run by Blast ApS. As such, the tournament was to be known as Esports World Cup: Featuring Fortnite.

On April 11, 2024, ESL, which supervises the Esports World Cup tournament series and by extension the Esports World Cup: Featuring Fortnite tournament, announced ESL Featuring Fortnite, a separate game developed by 404 Creative using Unreal Editor for Fortnite (UEFN), an editor used to make custom games using the Fortnite engine. ESL Featuring Fortnite operates as a 4-on-4 team shooter, not unlike Call of Duty or Halo, and features familiar team shooter modes like Capture the Flag and Hardpoint. This contrasts to the FNCS, which is played on the Fortnite Battle Royale video game and utilizes two-player teams, known as Duos, who are often are paired from different organizations. On the same day, ESL announced that esports organizations Dignitas, Team Heretics, Karmine Corp and ZETA DIVISION had committed to fielding teams to compete in ESL Featuring Fortnite tournaments, which would also include qualifiers for Esports World Cup: Featuring Fortnite and the tournament itself, with a then-unnamed Brazilian organization later revealed to be LOUD. Additional teams that would participate in ESL Featuring Fortnite tournaments were announced in May 2024.

Fortnite was one of the games at the Gamers8 festival, which was the predecessor to the Esports World Cup, for both 2022 and 2023. The Gamers8 tournaments for both years used Fortnite Battle Royale Duos like the FNCS, albeit with 88-player (or 44-Duo) fields.

== Format ==
The 16 teams who qualified for the tournament were placed into 4 GSL-style groups of 4 teams, with each match being a best-of-5 map series. The winners and runners-up of each group advanced to a single elimination playoff bracket; all matches in the playoffs were best-of-7 maps.

The top 8 teams at the tournament (those who qualified for the playoffs) gained Esports World Cup Club Championship points. Each organization had the possibility to qualify for the Club Championship itself if they placed in the top 8 in another EWC event, with the winning team's organization able to win the Club Championship as well if they also placed in the top 8 of another event.

== Qualified teams ==
Sixteen teams qualified for the Esports World Cup: Featuring Fortnite tournament: 6 teams qualified via an offline LAN tournament held at DreamHack Dallas in the United States, while 10 additional teams qualified via online qualifiers held on the FACEIT platform.

=== DreamHack Dallas qualifiers ===
- BIG CLAN
- Exceed (Note: Team qualified as Agent Gaming, but their spot was bought by Exceed on July 26.)
- Fnatic
- Heroic
- Karmine Corp
- Team Falcons

=== Online qualifiers ===
Europe

- Gaimin Gladiators
- R8 Esports (Note: Team qualified as VBBX.)

North America

- Dignitas
- XSET

Latin America

- Dragons eSports (Note: Team qualified as Team RomeroPDF before changing their name to Team Randu; they were signed by Dragons eSports on July 27.)
- w7m esports (Note: Team qualified as Team Frostykz7 before changing their name to Team Frosty; they were signed by w7m esports on July 26.)

Middle East and Africa

- Al-Ula FC (Note: Team qualified as BEST TEAM.)
- KS7 (Note: BMNF (later renamed to LND Esports) initially qualified as the 2nd place team in the MENA qualifier, but a permanent ban for cheating by one of their players meant their spot was vacated; this spot went to Team Kalgamer710 (later renamed to KS7), the 3rd place team in the qualifier.)

Asia-Pacific

- ZETA DIVISION

Oceania

- PWR

== Group stage ==
This stage was held on August 8 and 9, 2024. All start times are listed in Arabia Standard Time (AST, UTC+03:00).

Group A

Opening Matches
August 8, 3:00 p.m.
Team Falcons	3
ZETA DIVISION	0
August 8, 3:00 p.m.
Dragons eSports	0
XSET	3
Elimination Match
August 9, 6:00 p.m.
ZETA DIVISION	0
Dragons eSports	3

Winner's Match
August 8, 6:00 p.m.
Team Falcons	0
XSET	3
Decider Match
August 9, 9:00 p.m.
Team Falcons	3
Dragons eSports	2

Advance to Knockout stage
A1	XSET
A2	Team Falcons

Group B

Opening Matches
August 8, 4:30 p.m.
Exceed	3
PWR	0
August 8, 4:30 p.m.
Al-Ula FC	0
Gaimin Gladiators	3
Elimination Match
August 9, 6:00 p.m.
PWR	3
Al-Ula FC	0

Winner's Match
August 8, 6:00 p.m.
Exceed	3
Gamin Gladiators	2
Decider Match
August 9, 9:00 p.m.
Gaimin Gladiators	3
PWR	0

Advance to Knockout stage
B1	Exceed
B2	Gaimin Gladiators

Group C

Opening Matches
August 8, 7:30 p.m.
Fnatic	0
R8 Esports	3
August 8, 7:30 p.m.
Karmine Corp	3
KS7	0
Elimination Match
August 9, 7:30 p.m.
Fnatic	1
KS7	3

Winner's Match
August 8, 10:30 p.m.
R8 Esports	1
Karmine Corp	3
Decider Match
August 9, 10:30 p.m.
R8 Esports	3
KS7	2

Advance to Knockout stage
C1	Karmine Corp
C2	R8 Esports

Group D

Opening Matches
August 8, 9:00 p.m.
BIG CLAN	3
Dignitas	2
August 8, 9:00 p.m.
Heroic	3
w7m esports	1
Elimination Match
August 9, 7:30 p.m.
Dignitas	3
w7m esports	1

Winner's Match
August 8, 10:30 p.m.
BIG CLAN	1
Heroic	3
Decider Match
August 9, 10:30 p.m.
BIG CLAN	0
Dignitas	3

Advance to Knockout stage
D1	Heroic
D2	Dignitas

Source: esports.gg

== Playoffs ==
All start times are listed in Arabia Standard Time (AST, UTC+03:00).

Quarterfinals
August 10, 10:30 p.m.
A1	XSET	4
B2	Gaimin Gladiators	0
August 10, 6:00 p.m.
D1	Heroic	4
C2	R8 Esports	2
August 10, 7:30 p.m.
B1	Exceed	4
A2	Team Falcons	1
August 10, 9:00 p.m.
C1	Karmine Corp	4
D2	Dignitas	1

Semifinals
August 11, 7:30 p.m.
XSET	4
Heroic	1
August 11, 6:00 p.m.
Exceed	4
Karmine Corp	2

Finals
August 11, 10:30 p.m.
XSET	4
Exceed	2

Source: esports.gg

== Ranking ==
Place	Team	GS	QF	SF	Finals	Prize (%)	Prize (USD)	EWC Points
1st	XSET	2-0	4-0	4-1	4-2	40%	$400,000	1000
2nd	Exceed	2-0	4-1	4-2	2-4	16%	$160,000	600
3rd–4th	Heroic	2-0	4-2	1-4		8%	$80,000	275
3rd–4th	Karmine Corp	2-0	4-1	2-4		8%	$80,000	275
5th–8th	Gaimin Gladiators	2-1	0-4			4%	$40,000	60
5th–8th	R8 Esports	2-1	2-4			4%	$40,000	60
5th–8th	Team Falcons	2-1	1-4			4%	$40,000	60
5th–8th	Dignitas	2-1	1-4			4%	$40,000	60
9th-12th	Dragons eSports	1-2				2%	$20,000	0
9th-12th	PWR	1-2				2%	$20,000	0
9th-12th	KS7	1-2				2%	$20,000	0
9th-12th	BIG CLAN	1-2				2%	$20,000	0
13th-16th	ZETA DIVISION	0-2				1%	$10,000	0
13th-16th	Al-Ula FC	0-2				1%	$10,000	0
13th-16th	Fnatic	0-2				1%	$10,000	0
13th-16th	w7m esports	0-2				1%	$10,000	0
