= Greg Selkoe =

US entrepreneur

- Education: Rollins College (BA); Harvard Kennedy School (M.P.P.)
- Occupation: CEO of XSET
- Years active: 2000-present

Greg Selkoe is an American businessman. He is the founder of XSET. He previously founded the streetwear e-commerce company Karmaloop and served as the president and co-head of FaZe Clan.

== Early life and education ==
Selkoe was born in Boston, Massachusetts, on June 6, 1975, and grew up in the Jamaica Plain neighborhood. He was expelled from The Park School and graduated from The Winchendon School, a boarding school in Winchendon, Massachusetts.

Selkoe received a Bachelor of Arts from Rollins College in Winter Park, Florida in 1996. After graduating from Rollins, he worked for the City of Boston for three years at the Boston Redevelopment Authority. He then went on to earn a master's degree in Public Policy from Harvard University in 2005. Selkoe is also an alumnus of Y Combinator.

== Career ==
=== Karmaloop ===
In 2000, at the age of 25, Selkoe founded Karmaloop from his parents' basement in Jamaica Plain while working as an urban planner with the Boston Redevelopment Authority. Karmaloop began as a streetwear e-commerce company and expanded into a brick-and-mortar store that opened in Boston in 2005.

Under Selkoe's leadership, Karmaloop became a lifestyle network and global hub for "Verge Culture," with over 8 million monthly visitors and 940 million engaged social media followers. For his work with Karmaloop, Selkoe received the Ernst & Young Entrepreneur Of The Year 2012 Award in the e-commerce category in New England.

In 2011, Karmaloop reported approximately $130 million in sales.

A 2024 Complex retrospective described Karmaloop as an important online outlet for streetwear outside established fashion centers and cited industry figures who credited the site with helping introduce streetwear brands to a broader audience. Karmaloop also expanded into digital media through KarmaloopTV, which covered music, fashion and art. In 2011, musician and producer Pharrell Williams joined the venture as creative director as Karmaloop explored expanding its web-based programming into a television network. Selkoe also served on the board of the Kanye West Foundation. Karmaloop was acquired by footwear retailer Shiekh Shoes in 2016. A 2024 Complex retrospective reported that the site continued to operate under subsequent ownership.

=== Streetwear ===
In June 2015, Greg partnered with Paul Judge and Cedric Rogers to create Curateurs, a website devoted to exclusive men’s fashion items. Curateurs then evolved into Looklive, a startup that sold the apparel seen on TV shows. In 2016, Looklive announced an investment from Y Combinator and the launch of the Looklive app.

=== FaZe Clan ===
In 2018, Selkoe became president of FaZe Clan, while Lee Trink served as chief executive officer. During his tenure, FaZe completed a Series A financing round in December 2019 that included investment from Jimmy Iovine and NTWRK. In July 2020, Selkoe left FaZe Clan and co-founded XSET with Clinton Sparks, Wil Eddins and Marco Mereu.

=== XSET ===
In 2020, Selkoe founded the lifestyle brand XSET with Marco Mereu, Clinton Sparks, and Wil Eddins. As CEO of XSET, Selkoe aimed to create a more inclusive and diverse gaming organization that reflected the racial and gender diversity of the gaming world.

Under Selkoe's leadership, XSET expanded into multiple esports titles, including Fortnite, Rocket League, Call of Duty, and Apex Legends.

In February 2021, Quality Control Music invested in XSET as part of financing that brought the company's reported funding to $10 million. In July 2022, XSET raised a further $15 million Series A round led by LightWork Worldwide.

Some of XSET's notable moves include acquiring Queens Gaming Collective in 2023, signing professional Fortnite player and Twitch streamer with over 7.5+ million subscribers as of May 2024, Cody "Clix" Conrod, popular content creators like Kris London and CashNasty, and securing investments from entities like Quality Control Music and several NFL players.

Cody "Clix" Conrod joined XSET under a multiyear agreement that made him a co-owner. A 2025 Los Angeles Business Journal profile described XSET as a gaming media company with an increasing emphasis on content, merchandise and live fan experiences.

=== Philanthropy ===
Selkoe founded the Future Boston Alliance in 2011 to improve cultural life in Boston and retain local creative talent.

The organization advocated for Boston's creative economy and successfully pushed for late-night MBTA service and expanded access to liquor licenses. Selkoe also donated $300,000 toward the restoration of the Brewer Fountain on Boston Common.

=== Personal life ===
Selkoe currently lives in Boston, Massachusetts with his wife, Dina Selkoe, and their two children.
