= Reignite =

Japanese esports organization

- Divisions: Apex Legends; Fortnite; Valorant
- Founded: 2018
- Location: Japan
- Website: reignite.jp

Reignite (stylized in all caps) is a Japanese esports organization. The organization fields divisions in Apex Legends, Fortnite, and Valorant competitions, while also sponsoring content streamers. The organization is operated by Reignite Entertainment Co., Ltd.

== History ==
Reignite was officially established on 4 January 2021.

The org fielded Apex rosters in both the APAC North and APAC South regions, with the two teams competing as "Reignite North" and "Reignite South". The South team's roster was originally made up of "Zer0", "Genburten", and "Tempplex". The North team's existence was short-lived, as no org was allowed to operate teams in multiple regions for Apex Legends Global Series (ALGS) play. In September 2021, Reignite became jointly-operated by ITI Co., Ltd., and the Reignite North team became fully affiliated under the latter, rebranding as "RIG North". Reignite South was rebranded simply as Reignite.

In January 2022, Reignite lost the APAC South regional playoffs; despite being considerably ahead of other teams after reaching the Match Point threshold, they were unable to secure a match win after this. Later in March, Tempplex moved to Reignite's streamer division, and their Apex team became an All-Australian squad as Zer0 and Genburten were joined by Rick "Sharky" Wirth". In April, they won the regional SteelSeries Prime Invitational. The trio then competed in the 2022 ALGS Split 2 Playoffs LAN tournament, held in Stockholm. They had to play without their player "Genburten", considered the team's star player by esports media writers. Having to miss the championship after testing positive for COVID-19, he was substituted by loan player "jmw". Considered unexpected by media outlets, the team emerged as winners of the tournament, with Zer0 being named the tournament's MVP due to his in-game leadership.

Shortly thereafter, on 4 July, Reignite's players departed and were signed by DarkZero Esports. Reignite continues to field an Apex roster. In May 2024, they signed "Ftyan".

In July 2022, Reignite announced a Valorant team, dubbed "Reignite Lily" and made up of an all-female roster.
