= DarkZero Esports =

American esports organization

- Short name: DarkZero
- Divisions: Rainbow Six Siege
- Founded: 2018
- Based in: Las Vegas, Nevada
- Colors: Midnight purple, dusk purple, power blue, white, black/dark grey (Note: DarkZero's official brand guidelines, found via their press kit, list "black/dark grey" with a CMYK code of 90–100, as opposed to hex codes as with their other colors.)
- CEO: Don Kim
- Championships: Apex Legends – 1 (ALGS championship: 2022)
- Partners: Raven; Resorts World Las Vegas
- Website: darkzero.gg

DarkZero Esports, or simply DarkZero (DZ), is an American esports organization. Founded in 2018, DarkZero participates in competitive Rainbow Six Siege. They also own NRG Esports.

== Founding and structure ==
An American organization, DarkZero Esports was founded in 2018 by Zachary Matula. A private equity investor, Matula previously worked as a trader. Matula was the CEO of DarkZero until September 2021, when Don Kim filled the role; Kim previously served as the CEO of TSM (then known as Team SoloMid), another American esports organization. DarkZero is based in a facility in Las Vegas.

In April 2021, DarkZero announced a partnership with Respawn Products, specifically a one-year deal for the latter to become DarkZero's exclusive gaming furniture provider. DZ also entered a partnership with Aim Lab, which began in October 2020. Raven, a UK-based merchandise company, handles the team's apparel design and production. DZ also has an ownership stake in Raven. In August 2021, they announced a partnership with Resorts World Las Vegas.

On December 19, 2025, DarkZero Esports announced a full acquisition of NRG Esports. DarkZero opted to keep NRG's branding and rosters as they were, with Don Kim becoming CEO of NRG Esports and former CEO Andy Miller staying on as an advisor. All of DarkZero's existing rosters sans their Rainbow Six Siege roster would move to represent NRG from 2026.

== History in Tom Clancy's Rainbow Six Siege ==
The organization first participated in competitive Tom Clancy's Rainbow Six Siege (R6), joining the scene in November 2018, after acquiring SK Gaming's roster. In competitive R6 play, the team won the tenth season of the North American Rainbow Six Siege Pro League in 2019. They also won the North American League's 2020 August Major. In 2022, DZ won the Charlotte Major, defeating Astralis. DarkZero's roster for the Charlotte Major title featured Hyper, Ecl9pse, njr, Panbazou, and Canadian.

In October 2024, DarkZero earned a spot at the BLAST R6 Major Montreal tournament after defeating M80 in the North America League 2024 Stage 2 semifinals. They took the series 2–1, with a strong showing on Border, followed by a narrow loss on Chalet, and a decisive comeback on Clubhouse. (Note: Border, Chalet, and Clubhouse are all maps in Tom Clancy's Rainbow Six Siege.) This victory secured DarkZero's seventh international tournament berth since early 2023. They will face Soniqs in the grand final to determine the region's first seed and gain additional Six Invitational Points.

On March 5, 2025, Jason "Beaulo" Doty, announced his second retirement from the pro scene. Meanwhile, DarkZero dropped Elian "kobelax" Rodriguez due to his subpar performance. DZ replaced the two players with Canadian flex player Zachary "SpiriTz" Dionne and British fragger/flex, Ben "CTZN" McMillan. On May 14, 2025, after a 6-8 loss to G2 Esports on the map Bank, DZ failed to qualify for the playoffs of 2025 Rio RE:L0:AD, the game's first international event since rebranding to Tom Clancy's Rainbow Six Siege X (or simply Siege X).

== History in Valorant ==
In June 2021, DZ signed the Kooky Koalas roster for the org's foray into Valorant. This initial roster included Kyle "ScrewFace" Jensen, Yannick "KOLER" Blanchette, Nick "Harmon" Harmon, Adam "Ange" Milian, and Andy "Andersin" Collins, with Zack "huuaw" Solomon serving as the team's coach. They introduced a new roster lineup in April 2022, which included ScrewFace, Ange, Trick, drone, and ZexRow, as well as neilzinho serving as head coach. Despite this, DarkZero announced that July, they would be exiting the Valorant scene. Performance wise, DarkZero found little success in Valorant play. The org stated it hoped its departure from Valorant would be temporary.

On June 20, 2024, DarkZero re-entered the competitive Valorant scene, signing the Turtle Troop roster. The roster consists of Brenden "Stellar" McGrath, Corey "Corey" Nigra, Brandon "Bdog" Sanders, Matthew "Wedid" Suchan and Jack "Add3r" Hayashi.

== History in Apex Legends ==
=== Apex Legends Global Series (ALGS) Year 2 ===
In July 2022, the Japanese esports organization Reignite dissolved its Apex Legends roster, which consisted of Rhys "Zer0" Perry, Noyan "Genburten" Ozkose, and Rick "Sharky" Wirth. Zer0 plays as the team's In-Game Leader (IGL). The trio were fresh off their win of the ALGS Split 2 playoffs in Stockholm during the 2021–22 (ALGS Year 2) season. After taking multiple tests for COVID-19, Genburten was unable to play during these playoffs due a positive test on the first day of the tournament. British loan player Jake "Jmw" Walters substituted as the third player.

DarkZero then signed the trio as part of their entry into the ALGS scene, formally announcing their signing in July. The All-Australian trio would shortly thereafter go on to win the 2022 ALGS Championship, winning $500,000. With TSM and OpTic engaging in a "chaotic endgame", DZ won out against Spacestation and GMT in the final circle of the championship match. The win marked the second consecutive title for Zer0, Genburten, and Sharky, due to their ALGS Split 2 victory. Their ALGS Championship victory came so soon after their official signing with DarkZero, that the organization had not yet updated their website to include bios for the players.

=== ALGS Year 3 ===
During ALGS Year 3, DarkZero was considered by esports media writers and fans as one of the favorites of the competition alongside TSM. In November 2022, the team acquired Jaimson "PVPX" Moore as their head coach. In April 2023, during the middle of the 2022–23 (ALGS Year 3) season, Sharky left the team, expressing he lost passion for Apex; Beau "RamBeau" Sheid would fill-in for DarkZero's vacant roster spot. This was met with controversy, with other professional players criticizing this situation. Following the end of the ALGS Pro League regular season, RemBeau was left off the DZ roster and the organization instead picked up Rody "Xynew" Geissler as their third player. Zer0 and Genburten cited Xynew's "communication skills and game brain" as reasons they greenlit his acquisition; they also expressed that these strengths were unusual for a controller player such as Xynew. Now with Xynew, DarkZero won the 2023 ALGS North American (NA) Regional Finals.

Just shortly prior to the ALGS Year 3 Split 2 Playoffs, the team dropped PVPX and picked up coach "zz". DZ were challenged by the Aurora Gaming org during the group stage of the ALGS Split 2 playoffs. DarkZero ultimately went on to win the ALGS Split 2 Playoffs. Going into the Year 3 Championship, DarkZero were ranked second in the Apex Global Power Rankings – the rankings are determined by panelists from within the Apex Legends community.

=== ALGS Year 4 ===
Ahead of the 2023–24 ALGS season (or ALGS Year 4), Apex Legends publisher Electronic Arts (EA) announced DarkZero as one of the 12 ALGS partner teams; these teams receive "a variety of support programs and contributions" from EA and the game's developer, Respawn Entertainment. DZ's coach, "zz", quelled rumors that team would be returning to the APAC region for Year 4.

In January 2024, DarkZero signed Nicholas "Sikezz" Odom. He was previously signed to XSET, but left in November 2023, stating he had another roster spot lined up. Shortly thereafter, Xynew was announced to have joined Spacestation Gaming, effectively ending his tenure with DZ. In February, DarkZero assembled an all-women's Apex roster. Dubbed "DZ Eve", the roster includes players "Renee", "Scarlita", and "Samuraisky".

DZ finished in first-place in the 2024 ALGS Split 1 Pro League standings for the North American region. Heading into the 2024 ALGS Split 1 Playoffs, TSM's ImperialHal referenced DarkZero as their rivals. DarkZero would be one of the first two teams to reach match point in the Split 1 Playoffs, but ultimately lost to Reject Winnity.

On May 14, it was announced that Zer0 and Genburten would join with ImperialHal to form a "superteam" for Year 4 Split 2, though it was initially unclear if this was to be under DarkZero or as part of a different organization. On May 28, it was announced that the Saudi organization Team Falcons had signed the trio, ending both Zer0 and Genburten's tenure with DarkZero. In light of this move, DarkZero opted to release Sikezz, as well as zz, and their analyst "Privacy", as the org re-evaluated its Apex position.

== Other games ==
DarkZero also fields rosters in League of Legends and Marvel Rivals.

== Rosters ==
Tom Clancy's Rainbow Six Siege

DarkZero Esports Rainbow Six Siege roster
Players
Coaches

Handle	Name	Nationality
Nuers	James, Ethan	United States
NJR	Rapier, Nick	United States
J90	Burkard, Jack	United States
Fultz	Fultz, Alec	United States
Kyno	Figueiredo, Leonardo	Brazil

Head coach

Seth "Callout" Mik

Assistant coach(es)

Arthur "TchubZ" Figueira

Legend:
- (I) Inactive
- (S) Suspended
- Substitute
- (injured) Injury / Illness

Latest roster transaction: September 9, 2026 (Note: DarkZero's timeline and roster listings on Rainbow Six Siege's publisher Ubisoft's website state the most recent transaction was Koshi joining the team.).

== Team accomplishments and honors ==
- Apex Legends Global Series (ALGS):
  - ALGS Championship (2021–22)
  - Split Playoffs winners (2022–23 Split 2)
  - Pro League – North America 1st-place finishes (2023–24 Split 1)
- Tom Clancy's Rainbow Six Siege major wins:
  - BLAST R6 Major Salt Lake City 2026
  - Charlotte 2022 major
  - North American regional August 2020 major
