= Tekken World Tour =

Esports circuit for the Tekken series

- Game: Tekken series Tekken 7 (2017–2023); Tekken 8 (since 2024)
- Founded: 2017
- Owner: Bandai Namco Entertainment
- Country: Global
- Most recent champion: LowHigh (2025)
- Most titles: Rangchu (2 titles)
- Website: Tekken World Tour

The Tekken World Tour (TWT) is an esports tournament circuit for the video game series Tekken organized by series developer Bandai Namco Entertainment. Each TWT season sees players earn points by participating in Tekken tournaments held worldwide, culminating with the Tekken World Tour Finals, featuring the highest-scoring players of the season. Since 2024, the tournament is played on Tekken 8, with prior seasons having Tekken 7 as the game played.

Aside from the global circuit, Tekken World Tour also includes a regional circuit known as the "Dojo", which allows for smaller, local tournaments to be part of the TWT circuit.

== History ==
On 26 May 2017, Bandai Namco Entertainment, the developer and publisher of the Tekken series, announced the creation of the Tekken World Tour ahead of the home console and PC release of Tekken 7. The circuit was part of a partnership with the streaming platform Twitch, in which the service would have exclusive streaming rights to all TWT tournaments.

In 2019, Bandai Namco added the Dojo system, which allows local tournament organizers to have their events become part of the overall circuit. Points earned from Dojo are dependent on player participation and count towards both the global leaderboard and a separate regional leaderboard, acting as an additional pathway to the Finals.

In early 2026, ahead of the Finals for the 2025 season, the Dojo system became the subject of controversy after it was alleged that some players who qualified for Finals artificially inflated player counts in some tournaments to earn the maximum points possible from Dojo events (Dojo events with at least 96 players have the most points awarded to top-ranked players). Following the aforementioned backlash, Bandai Namco have stated that the Dojo system would have increased moderation beginning with the 2026 season.

== Format ==
The Tekken World Tour is divided into two main pathways: the global leaderboard and the regional leaderboard. Players earn points in the global leaderboard by competing in a selection of events held around the world. The events are divided into four tiers, Master+, Master, Challenger, and Dojo, in which only a number of the player's top finishes at each tier will have their points tallied for the leaderboard. At the culmination of the circuit, the highest-scoring players qualify for the season Finals. Dojo events also count towards a separate regional leaderboard, which qualifies the highest-scoring player per region to the Finals.

The Finals is divided into three phases: group stage, Last Chance Qualifier (LCQ), and the final bracket. The Last Chance Qualifier is an open competition for the final few slots of the final bracket. The final bracket is a double-elimination tournament to determine the season champion.

Starting in 2026, on top of the global and regional leaderboards, players can also qualify directly to the Finals by winning a "Master+" event, the highest classification an event could get, or the Esports World Cup, an event separate that is separate from the Tekken World Tour.

== List of seasons ==
Season	Finals location	Champion	Runner-up	Third place	Ref.
Tekken 7 era
2017	(United States) San Francisco	(South Korea) Qudans	(South Korea) Saint	(South Korea) JDCR	
2018	(Netherlands) Amsterdam	(South Korea) Rangchu	(South Korea) Saint	(South Korea) Knee	
2019	(Thailand) Bangkok	(Japan) Chikurin	(South Korea) Ulsan	(South Korea) Knee	
2020	Cancelled due to COVID-19 pandemic				
2022	(Netherlands) Amsterdam	(Pakistan) Atif Butt	(South Korea) JeonDDing	(Japan) Chikurin	
2023	(United States) New Orleans	(Pakistan) Arslan Ash	(South Korea) CBM	(South Korea) Ulsan	
Tekken 8 era
2024	(Japan) Tokyo	(South Korea) Rangchu	(Pakistan) Atif Butt	(Saudi Arabia) Raef	
2025	(Sweden) Malmö	(South Korea) LowHigh	(South Korea) Mangja	(Pakistan) Atif Butt	
2026	Singapore				
