= Ulsan (gamer) =

South Korean esports player (born 2000)

Personal information
- Name: Lim Soo-hoon (임수훈)
- Born: 9 February 2000 (age 26)
- Nationality: South Korean

Current team
- Team: DN Freecs
- Role: Professional player
- Game: Tekken

Career information
- Playing career: 2018–present

Career highlights and awards
- 2× Esports World Cup champion (2024, 2025)

Lim Soo-hoon (Korean: 임수훈; born February 9, 2000), handle Ulsan, is a South Korean professional Tekken player. He is currently playing for DN Freecs and is best known for his accomplishments in Tekken 7 and Tekken 8, winning two-time Esports World Cup in 2024 and 2025.

== Career ==
Ulsan entered the international competitive scene in 2018, gaining recognition for his strong performances with characters such as Kazumi and Lili in Tekken 7. By 2019, he was competing at major global tournaments, including a second-place finish at the Tekken World Tour Finals that year.

During the Tekken 8 competitive cycle, Ulsan won the 2024 Esports World Cup, defeating Arslan Ash in the grand finals. He repeated this feat at the 2025 edition of the event, securing back-to-back championships by overcoming LowHigh in the finals.

In addition to his EWC titles, Ulsan have victories at CEO 2025, Red Bull Golden Letters 2024, SOOP TEKKEN League 2024: Champions, and REV Major 2023.

== Achievements ==
- 1st – 2025 Esports World Cup (Tekken 8)
- 1st – 2024 Esports World Cup (Tekken 8)
- 1st – REV Major 2023 (Tekken 7)
