= Strinova =

2024 video game by iDreamSky

- Cover art featuring some of the playable characters, left to right: Bai Mo, Michele, Lawine (front row), Flavia, Meredith, Nobunaga, and Fuchsia (back row)
- Developer: iDreamSky
- Publisher: iDreamSky
- Engine: Unreal Engine 4
- Platform: Windows
- Release: CN: February 1, 2024; WW: November 21, 2024; SEA: October 23, 2026
- Genres: Hero shooter; Tactical shooter
- Mode: Multiplayer

Strinova (Note: Chinese: 卡拉彼丘) (formerly CalabiYau) is a third-person tactical hero shooter developed and published by iDreamSky. It introduces "stringification", a mechanic which allows players to switch between a 3D and a paper-like 2D form of their character. The game started development in 2019 and was released in China on February 1, 2024. It was released globally on November 21, 2024.

== Gameplay ==
Strinova is an anime-themed hero shooter, having the players play as characters called "Superstrings". It introduces a unique mechanic called "stringification", where the player can switch between 2D and 3D forms of their character. While in the 2D form, the player becomes paper-like, can stick to walls, and can glide from higher places. This allows the player access to narrow pathways and avoid getting shot, even while reloading. Each character has their own primary weapon and ability set, with configurable secondary weapons. Modes are divided into 3 categories: Challenge, Ranked, and Custom. There are 8 modes available in the Challenge mode: Team Arena, Demolition, Escort, Sword Clash, Outbreak, Gunslinger Showdown, Arcade Mode (a rotation of Conquest or Bobblehead Brawl), and Team Deathmatch. Only Demolition is available in Ranked. An additional Crystal Clash mode is available, separate from the other categories. In custom matches, players can choose any mode and change their characters' abilities. There are 24 characters and 29 maps in the game.

In Demolition, an attacking team of five players rush to plant a bomb in set places around the map while a defending team tries to stop them. Points are awarded to each player based on their performance from the previous round, which allows them to purchase improvements to the agent or their weapon and unlock "Awakening Skills"—abilities specific to that agent.

In Escort, an attacking team must escort a payload across the map to its final goal, while a defending team attempts to stop them. In Team Deathmatch, 3 teams of five players compete to reach a certain number of kills for their team first. In Team Arena, two teams of seven are placed on opposing sides of the map, with the goal of reaching a certain number of kills of the opposing team.

Superstrings are placed into one of five categories: Controller, Duelist, Initiator, Sentinel, and Support. In addition, they are split into three factions: The Painting Utopia Society (P.U.S.), The Scissors, and Urbino. On the Demolition mode, players on the defensive team can only choose between P.U.S. and Urbino characters, while players on the attacking team can only choose between The Scissors and Urbino characters.

Players have the option to customize the characters they have unlocked. The player can also increase their bond level with select characters, unlocking special items, skins, or cutscenes for that character. These cosmetics, particularly limited-time ones, can also be acquired through the game's gacha system, or bought for free and paid currencies.

== Development ==
iDreamSky, Strinova's developer and publisher, is a video game publisher primarily known for Chinese releases of mobile games such as Subway Surfers. The company received investments from Sony and Tencent for the development of Strinova. The game is the company's first in-house game targeted for Western audiences. Strinova began development in 2019, with the goal of creating an anime-themed third-person shooter. Stringification and character skills were designed to take focus away from aim and gun control—aspects of shooting games which the developers saw as unpleasant for players.

A closed beta of the game was released in June 2024, with a second beta test in October 2024. Its second beta test coincided with the release of a demo for the Steam Next Fest. The game went on early access for Windows in China on August 3, 2023. It was released in China on February 1, 2024. iDreamSky released the game for Windows globally on November 21, 2024. iDreamSky had planned on releasing the game on Android, iOS, PlayStation 5, and Xbox Series in 2025. The open beta of the mobile version was launched in China in October 2025, partnering with the Japanese girl group @onefive as ambassadors, who produced the collaboration theme song "Meow Meow Heartbeat" (喵喵心跳, Miāo Miāo Xīntiào).

Strinova was officially released in Vietnam on October 23, 2026. The game was brought to the Vietnamese market by publisher Gzone in collaboration with the original developer, iDreamSky. Ahead of the official launch, pre-registrations opened on October 13, followed by an early access phase on October 20.

== Reception ==
Strinova has received generally positive critical reviews during its beta tests, most of which praise the game's "stringification" mechanic. Jeremy Gan of Engadget called the mechanic "incredibly entertaining", while Shuan Cichacki of Vice called it "one of the wackiest gimmicks I've ever seen."

The game has been compared to other shooter games such as Valorant and Overwatch, owing to its similar gameplay mechanics. It has also been likened to Paper Mario, due to each superstring's ability to turn into paper.
