= XSET =

American esports organization

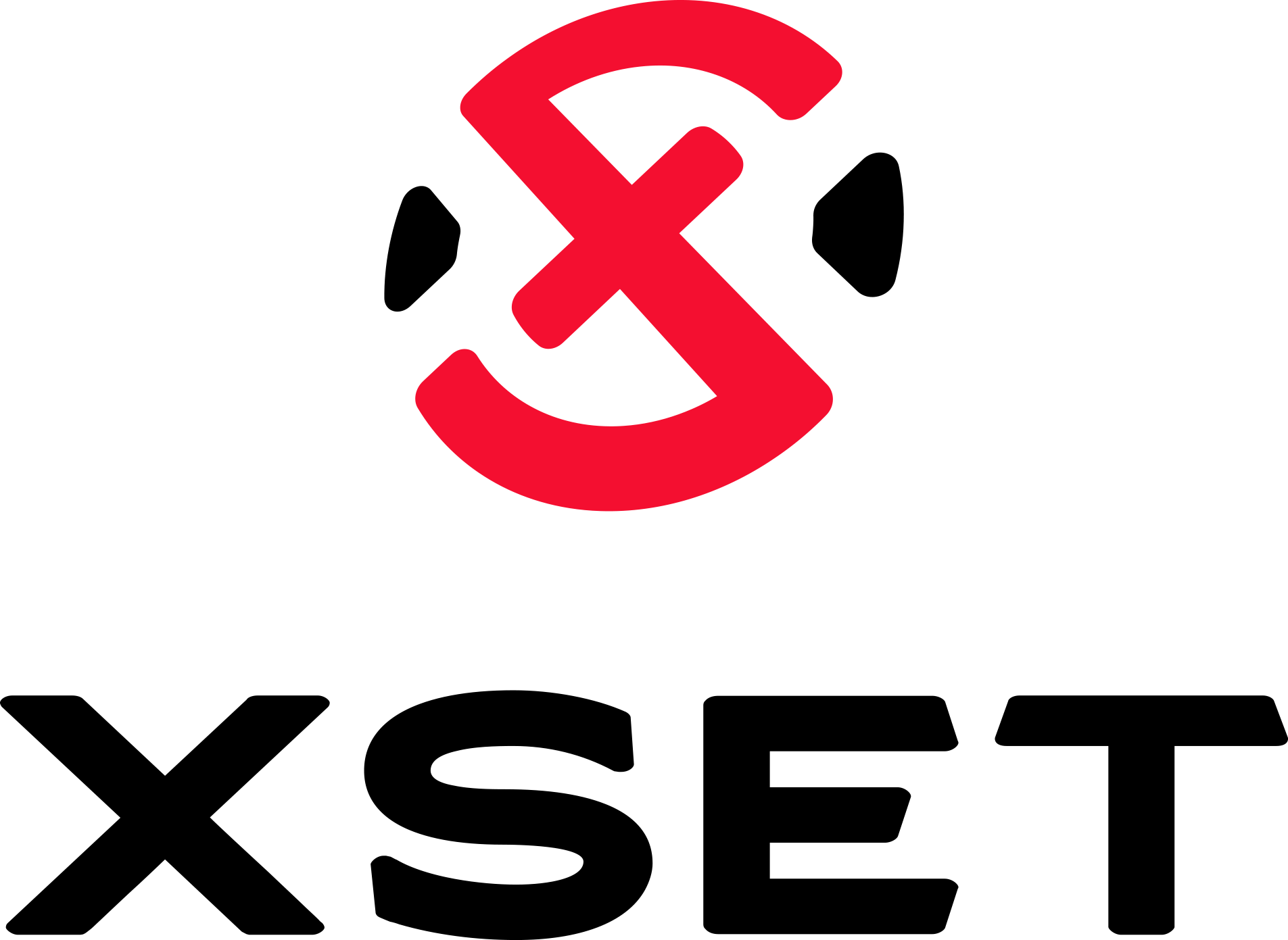
- Full name: XSET Gaming
- Games: Call of Duty: Warzone; Call of Duty: Mobile; Fortnite; Apex Legends; PUBG Mobile; Tom Clancy's Rainbow Six Siege; Rocket League; Madden NFL; Halo Infinite; iRacing
- Founded: July 16, 2020; 6 years ago
- Location: Boston, Massachusetts, U.S.
- CEO: Greg Selkoe
- Partners: Scuf Gaming; GHOST; Respawn Products; HyperX; Interscope; Mavix
- Website: Official website

XSET is an North American professional gaming and lifestyle media brand based in Boston, Massachusetts. It was founded in 2020 by Greg Selkoe, Marco Mereu, Clinton Sparks, and Wil Eddins.

== History ==
XSET was launched on July 16, 2020, by a group of former executives from FaZe Clan. Selkoe, who previously founded Karmaloop, wanted to create a more inclusive and diverse gaming organization that reflected the racial and gender diversity in the gaming world.

XSET has professional teams competing in various esports titles such as Fortnite, Rocket League, Call of Duty: Warzone, Call of Duty: Mobile, PUBG Mobile, Madden NFL, Apex Legends, Tom Clancy's Rainbow Six Siege, Halo Infinite, and iRacing.

In October 2020, Ozuna and Swae Lee joined XSET as investors. In February 2021, hip-hop record label Quality Control invested in XSET during a $10 million funding round.

On October 10, 2023, Cody "Clix" Conrod joined XSET as a co-owner and ambassador in a multi-year partnership deal. Clix released a limited-edition merchandise collection with XSET and in-game activations and content while supporting up-and-coming Fortnite players.

== Brand and culture ==
In addition to its competitive esports teams, XSET has a roster of content creators and brand ambassadors. Notable names include Swae Lee, Ozuna, Lil Wayne, Tee Grizzley, Brycent, Ezekiel Elliott, Kris London, and CashNasty.

In 2022, XSET unveiled the first-ever gaming cabanas in partnership with Drai's Beachclub in Las Vegas.

== Acquisitions and expansions ==
In April 2023, XSET acquired Queens Gaming Collective.

In July 2023, XSET signed Kris London and CashNasty to create exclusive collaborations, content, and merchandise drops. That same year, XSET signed the robot Sophia, the first humanoid signed by a gaming organization.

== Merchandise and collaborations ==
Notable collaborations include:

- Apparel drops with Ganga, featuring his signature "nomad" and Salvador Dalí-inspired designs.
- Merchandise capsules with Kris London and CashNasty.
- A partnership and limited-edition merchandise collection with Cody 'Clix' Conrod.
- SCUF Gaming, HyperX, GHOST Lifestyle
- Fashion and apparel: Roots Canada, Lids
- Quality Control Music, Roland (for the Drop The Bass apparel collection celebrating the TR-808 drum machine)
- Boston Red Sox, Drai's Las Vegas
- Fanshark, Wahlburgers

== Content and activations ==
XSET has a presence in various cultural spaces, including:

- A gaming residency at Drai's Beachclub and Nightclub.
- An activation at Ozuna Fest in Cancun in December 2021.
- Participation in the Breakaway Music Festival 2023.
- A takeover of Boston's Fenway Park for an "XSET Day."

In 2022, XSET also launched the Black Xcellence program.

== Offices ==
The company has offices in Boston and Los Angeles.
