= Reject (esports) =

Japanese esports organization

- Divisions: Apex Legends; Brawl Stars; Identity V; League of Legends; PUBG Mobile; Street Fighter; Super Smash Bros.; Valorant
- Founded: 2018
- Location: Japan
- Owners: REJECT Corporation
- Website: reject.jp

Reject (stylized in all caps) is a Japanese esports organization. Founded in 2018, the org fields rosters in Apex Legends, Brawl Stars, Identity V, League of Legends, PUBG Mobile and Valorant competitions. Reject also sponsors players in Street Fighter and Super Smash Bros. competitions.

== History ==
Reject was founded in 2018. The organization is owned by the Reject Corporation. Z Venture Capital Corporation is Reject's lead investor, whereas Jafco Group Inc. and East Ventures are managing partners.

In September 2020, Reject absorbed and rebranded Nora Rengo (NRG), a team competing in Tom Clancy's Rainbow Six Siege (R6). In 2021, Reject opened a Tokyo-based building that functions as a training facility and office for the org's esports athletes. In November 2022, Reject announced it would be leaving the R6 scene, disbanding its team and allowing the contracts of their players and staff to lapse. In March 2023, the org entered a sponsorship agreement with Sony's "INZONE" gaming gear monitor series.

In January 2024, the organization signed VTubers to create content under the Reject brand. In April, the org's PUBG Mobile team won the PUBG Mobile Global Open (PMGO) 2024 Brazil tournament. In May, Reject signed a sponsorship deal with Visa Worldwide Japan K.K.

=== In Apex Legends ===
Reject originally fielded an Apex roster in 2020. In August 2022, the org left Apex play.

In January 2024, Reject partnered with Winnity, an Apex Legends communication platform and re-entered the competitive Apex scene. The org's Apex team competes under the name Reject Winnity (stylized in all caps). Upon the org's return to Apex, they signed the all-Korean trio of Lim "Obly" Jung-hyun, Lee "KaronPe" Min-hyuk, and Han "SangJoon" Sang-jun. Kim "ahn2e" Gun-ho was also brought on, serving as the team's coach. The team won the 2024 Apex Legends Global Series (ALGS) APAC North regional finals. The trio went on to win the 2024 ALGS Split 1 Playoffs LAN, becoming the first team from the APAC North region to win an ALGS LAN tournament. By winning, Reject upset runners-up DarkZero Esports, one of the favorites to win the tournament.
