= List of Map Men episodes =

Map Men logo since Series 3.

Map Men is a British edutainment mini-series created, written, and presented by Jay Foreman and Mark Cooper-Jones.

== Overview ==
Series	Episodes	Originally released	
Series	Episodes	First released	Last released
1	6	4 May 2016	7 August 2016
2	5	15 April 2019	2 September 2019
3	11	16 November 2020	13 September 2021
4	7	10 July 2023	31 August 2024
Specials	3 (Note: Includes the sponsored episode "Map Men vs. Geoguessr", as well as two sponsored shorts about the Ordnance Survey, all of which were released between series 4 and 5 and were produced outside of the standard episode production cycle.)	13 October 2024	30 June 2025
5	7	15 September 2025	21 September 2026
Special	1 (Note: Includes the single episode "Map Men vs Geoguessr 2: Mark's Revenge?".)	9 March 2026	

== Episodes ==
The average episode of Map Men features Jay Foreman and Mark Cooper-Jones as they answer a short geographical question, often involving maps and frequently mix in comedic elements. According to Foreman, a series is loosely defined when the hosts change their primary outfits, as they typically record a series of episodes in same-day batches.

=== Series 1 (2016) ===
Episodes of Series 1 of Map Men
No. overall	No. in series	Title	Original release date
1	1	"Bir Tawil – the land that nobody wants"	4 May 2016
Jay and Mark discuss the disputed territory of Bir Tawil which sits between Egypt and Sudan, although neither country claims it.
2	2	"Mappa Mundi – the worst world map?"	24 May 2016
Jay and Mark examine the 13th century Hereford Mappa Mundi and discuss its unique Christian depiction of the world over a geographically accurate one.
3	3	"Where is the north–south divide?"	10 June 2016
North England and South England have cultural, economic, and historical differences. Jay and Mark try to figure out where the dividing line is.
4	4	"India–Bangladesh – the world's worst border"	8 July 2016
Jay and Mark discuss the enclave and exclaves of the Bangladesh–India border.
5	5	"Why is there a blank space in this map of East Berlin?"	4 August 2016
Jay and Mark examine a map of East Berlin which contains a notable blank space where West Berlin should be.
6	6	"Who owns the South China Sea?"	7 August 2016
Jay and Mark discuss the geopolitical ownership of the South China Sea.

=== Series 2 (2019) ===
Episodes of Series 2 of Map Men
No. overall	No. in series	Title	Original release date
7	1	"The world's oldest border?"	15 April 2019
Jay and Mark discuss the border between England and Scotland and its potential origins in the Caledonian orogeny. They mention the town of Berwick-upon-Tweed which has swapped hands between the two nations roughly 14 times, the last time to England in 1482.
8	2	"Why do maps show places that don't exist?"	13 May 2019
Jay and Mark discuss maps with purposefully inaccurate details that catch cartography companies from copying each other.
9	3	"Why every world map is wrong"	20 June 2019
Jay and Mark discuss the problems with projecting the Earth onto a two-dimensional map. They notably talk about the Mercator projection, widely used up to the 21st century.
10	4	"How did triangles shrink France?"	7 August 2019
Jay and Mark examine the Cassini map of France and how the four generations of the Cassini family used triangulation to complete it.
11	5	"The world's silliest time zones"	2 September 2019
Jay and Mark discuss time zones and how some anomalies have risen due to border arrangements.

=== Series 3 (2020–2021) ===
Episodes of Series 3 of Map Men
No. overall	No. in series	Title	Original release date
12	1	"The map that saved the most lives"	16 November 2020
Jay and Mark examine how Dr. John Snow used map data to identify the source of a deadly cholera outbreak in 1854. This episode was written during and took inspiration from the COVID-19 lockdowns.
13	2	"Why are British place names so hard to pronounce?"	14 December 2020
Jay and Mark explore the history behind various British towns and villages that have difficult names to pronounce.
14	3	"Why does Russia have the best maps of Britain?"	11 January 2021
Jay and Mark examine how Soviet cartographers during the Cold War produced incredibly detailed maps of Britain and the world.
15	4	"What will the world look like in 250 million years?"	15 February 2021
Jay and Mark explain the scientific theory of continental drift as proposed by Alfred Wegener and how the continents have shifted and will shift over millions of years due to the supercontinent cycle.
16	5	"Who owns Antarctica?"	15 March 2021
Jay and Mark discuss the geopolitics surrounding Antarctica.
17	6	"The mystery of the squarest country"	12 April 2021
Jay and Mark figure out which country is the most square-shaped. They deduce that Egypt is the squarest country. Note: This episode is in song form.
18	7	"Where is America?"	26 April 2021
Jay and Mark discuss the ambiguity of the term "America" and how it does not solely refer to the United States of America.
19	8	"How do you start a new country?"	30 May 2021
Jay and Mark discuss how countries become countries and various failed attempts for statehood.
20	9	"How many continents are there?"	28 June 2021
Jay and Mark examine how many continents are on Earth and how various groups define continents.
21	10	"The longitude problem: history's deadliest riddle"	28 July 2021
Jay and Mark explore the history of longitude and how figuring it out was vital to exploration and travel around the world.
22	11	"English counties explained"	13 September 2021
Jay and Mark explain the history and types of counties in England, including historical, administrative, postal, ceremonial, metropolitan and non-metropolitan.

=== Series 4 (2023–2024) ===
Episodes of Series 4 of Map Men
No. overall	No. in series	Title	Original release date
23	1	"Why is North up?"	10 July 2023
Jay and Mark explore why north is at the top of most world maps.
24	2	"Why British cities make no sense"	28 August 2023
Jay and Mark examine why settlements in the United Kingdom seemingly are inconsistently categorized as "cities" or not "cities".
25	3	"Internet vs ocean: the essential wires we never think about"	29 September 2023
Jay and Mark explore the history of communication from letters, telegraphy, morse code, and eventually to the Internet. They also discuss the importance of maintaining the security of undersea internet cables in the 21st century.
26	4	"You'll never guess the most popular internet country code"	6 December 2023
Jay and Mark discuss country code internet domains and how they were established. Prior to November 2023, when the free domain model was discontinued for scam and phishing purposes, Tokelau had the most sites registered under the .tk domain.
27	5	"The phantom island of Google Maps"	24 April 2024
Jay and Mark examine the history of phantom islands and how they have been falsely added to sites like Google Maps.
28	6	"There are not 195 countries"	23 June 2024
Jay and Mark attempt to figure out a final answer to how many countries there are in the world. They use various methods to figure out the answer, although find various contradictions. The United Nations states there are 193 recognized countries (plus 2 observer states), if limited recognition states are included, the total is 208. If only non-disputed nations are recognized, the total is 188. If non-sovereign, but still "act like" countries are included, 282. Recognizing micronations, 368. Due to global politics and inconsistencies, Jay and Mark's final answer is: "It depends who you ask." and estimate "around 200" total countries.
29	7	"Weird maps win elections – gerrymandering explained"	31 August 2024
Jay and Mark discuss the history and present-day consequences of Gerrymandering in the United States.

=== Specials (2024–2025) ===
Episodes of Specials (2024-2025) of Map Men
No. overall	No. in series	Title	Original release date
30	1	"Map Men vs Geoguessr"	13 October 2024
Jay and Mark play against each other in 2 games (each of 5 rounds) of Geoguessr. The person with the least amount of points by the end of the 5 rounds would be sent to the destination farthest from where they guessed in-game for that particular game. Results: Jay won both games. (Game 1: 22,202 points; Game 2: 16,901 points).; Mark lost both games. (Game 1: 18,618 points; Game 2: 16,706 points).; Mark was sent to Bermuda and Dakar, Senegal.
31	2	"We met Britain's best map makers"	23 June 2025
Jay and Mark visit the Ordnance Survey in Southampton, England to show how vital their mapping data is to everyday life in the United Kingdom. Note: This episode is in Short form.
32	3	"Ordnance Survey let us change the map of Britain"	30 June 2025
Jay and Mark team up with Callum, a worker for the Ordnance Survey, to map out a local neighbourhood that has yet to be mapped. They go into further detail on how the OS surveys the country, notably aerial photography and street view. Note: This episode is in Short form.

=== Series 5 (2025–2026) ===
Episodes of Series 5 of Map Men
No. overall	No. in series	Title	Original release date
33	1	"Twin towns: what went wrong?"	15 September 2025
Jay and Mark discuss twin towns between the United Kingdom and other countries.
34	2	"This country is 17% fake"	16 October 2025
Jay and Mark examine how the Netherlands is 17% artificial through its land reclamation processes.
35	3	"The English divide nobody talks about"	8 December 2025
Jay and Mark discuss the rarely discussed "east-west divide" of England as opposed to the north-south divide.
37	4	"The world's most annoying road"	20 March 2026
Jay and Mark examine the Pan-American highway concept and the Darien Gap which harshly divides the highway in two. The highway is not a singular, continuous road, but rather a collection of various highways spanning 14 countries.
38	5	"The first two voyages around the world"	15 June 2026
Jay and Mark discuss whether Ferdinand Magellan (portrayed by Jay) or Francis Drake (portrayed by Mark) suffered a worse voyage around the world than the other. This video is presented in a stylized video game format. Results: Magellan won the "pota-trophy" (Note: A portmanteau of potato and trophy.) for the "most historically disastrous voyage" and first person to circumnavigate to the Earth, although he died years before his ship returned to Spain. His trip took 1,081 days.; Drake managed to circumnavigate the Earth many years after Magellan. He successfully completed his own trip in 1,045 days, 36 days quicker than Magellan.
39	6	"Where do hills come from?"	29 June 2026
Jay and Mark examine how Britain's hills were formed by ancient tectonic collisions and the erosion of massive mountain ranges over millions of years, highlighting the pioneering geological mapping work of William Smith.
40	7	"Why a Language Map of the World is Impossible"	21 September 2026
Jay and Mark discuss the intricacies of mapping the world's languages and why it proves virtually impossible.

=== Special (2026) ===
Episode of Special (2026) of Map Men
No. overall	No. in series	Title	Original release date
36	1	"Map Men vs Geoguessr 2: Mark's revenge?"	9 March 2026
Jay and Mark play against each other in 2 games (each of 5 rounds) of Geoguessr. The person with the least amount of points by the end of the 5 rounds would be sent to the destination farthest from where they guessed in-game for that particular round. Results: Jay won the first game and lost the second game. (Game 1: 17,859 points; Game 2: 1,483 points).; Mark lost the first game and won the second game. (Game 1: 16,401 points; Game 2: 13,021 points).; Mark was sent to Réunion, France. Jay was sent to Manchester, United Kingdom. (Note: Jay was supposed to be sent to Ulaanbaatar, Mongolia, due to his distance being the farthest in round 4 of game 2. (5,331 miles off-target). Due to an in-game technicality during round 5 of game 2, Jay, knowing the proper location was either in the United Kingdom or Ireland, purposefully selected a point in the South Pacific Ocean to be the "farthest" away, so his destination would be physically closer than Ulaanbaatar. (11,897 miles off-target).)
