= Infrastructure in London =

The utility infrastructure of London, England comprises a range of services and facilities that support and enable the functioning of London as a world city. Infrastructure includes facilities associated with products and materials that are consumed such as electricity, gas, water, heating and liquid fuels; materials that are produced such as sewage and solid waste; and facilities that enable communication and connectivity – telecommunications.

The historical background of the infrastructure provides the context of how these facilities are structured and currently operate.

== Electricity ==
=== History ===
Early electricity supplies in London were for public, commercial and domestic lighting. The generation and supply of electricity required authorisation from the Board of Trade. Such authorisation generally limited an electricity undertaking (a company, local authority or person) to a municipal authority area. The first sustainable long-term undertaking in London was the London Electricity Supply Corporation which supplied parts of Westminster from 1885. By 1900 there were 13 company and 8 local authority undertakings in London. Electricity supply and demand increased rapidly as new uses such as electric motors and domestic appliances e.g. kettles, cookers and irons became available. The growth of electricity supply and consumption in London is shown in the table.

Growth of electricity supply in London
Year	Electricity sold, GWh		
Year	Metropolitan Boroughs	Companies	Total
1903	27.96	85.94	113.9
1913	109.99	176.56	286.55
1921	167.89	243.84	411.73
1923	257.14	362.46	619.60
1933	710.79	1857.63	2568.42
1936	900.27	2344.88	3245.15
Nationalisation (1948) – London Electricity Board
1949	–	–	3655.19
1954	–	–	5067.32
1959	–	–	7110.43
1964	–	–	10,655.30
1971	–	–	13,150.0
1976	–	–	14,225.0
1981	–	–	14,541.0
1987	–	–	17,058.0
1989	–	–	17,784.0

The most visible aspects of electricity supply were the power stations around London. The table below shows those on the River Thames in London (from west to east).

River Thames power stations in London
Power station	Commissioned	Decommissioned	Status
Barnes	1901	1959	Commercial use
Hammersmith	1897	1965	Demolished
Fulham	1901	1978	Demolished
Wandsworth	1897	1964	Demolished
Lombard Road	1901	1972	Demolished
Lots Road	1905	2002	Residential and commercial use
Battersea	1933	1983	Residential and commercial use
Bankside	1891/1952	1959/1981	Now Tate Modern
Deptford	1891	1983	Demolished
Greenwich	1906		Operational
Blackwall Point	1900/1947	1947/1984	Demolished
Brunswick Wharf	1952	1984	Demolished
Woolwich	1893	1978	Demolished
Barking	1925/1933/1952/1995	1969/1976/1981/2018	Demolished
Belvedere	1960	1986	Demolished

Other power stations in London were at Barnes, Bow, East Ham, Finchley, Grove Road, Hackney, Hammersmith, Hornsey, Islington, Poplar, St. Marylebone, St. Pancras, Stepney, Walthamstow, Wandsworth, West Ham, Willesden, and Wimbledon.

The electricity supply industry was nationalised in 1948, under the provisions of the Electricity Act 1947 the electricity undertakings were bought by the government. The electricity generating and transmission functions were taken over by the British Electricity Authority (BEA) and their electricity distribution and sales functions by twelve area boards. In London this was the London Electricity Board (LEB). The LEB became the public face of the electricity industry in London. The BEA later became the Central Electricity Authority (1955–57) and then the Central Electricity Generating Board (CEGB) from 1958.

The electricity industry was privatised in 1990 by the Electricity Act 1989. The CEGB was split into three new companies: PowerGen, National Power and National Grid Company. The functions of twelve area electricity boards were vested in independent regional electricity companies (RECs). In London the London Electricity Board was vested in London Electricity plc. The RECs were floated on the London Stock Exchange on 11 December 1990. Several were subsequently acquired by other utility companies.

=== Current infrastructure ===
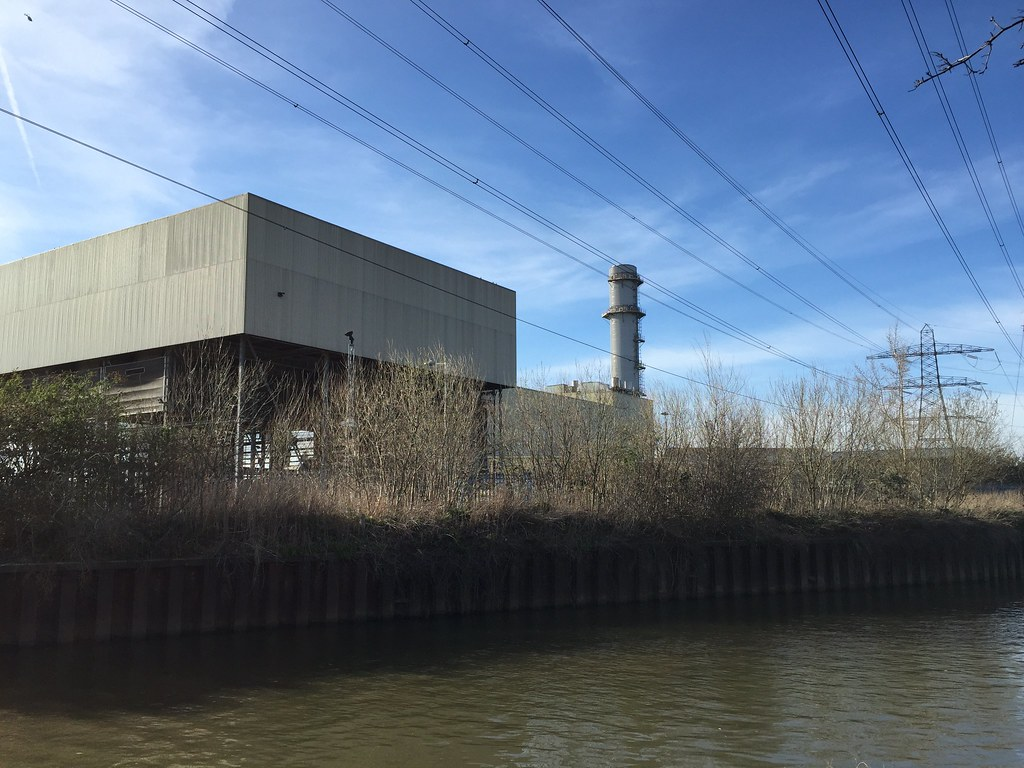
Enfield Power Station in the North London Borough of Enfield

The only main operational power station in London is the gas-fired 408 MW Enfield power station. Apart from the few redundant but extant power station buildings, the physical infrastructure of the electricity industry in London is largely hidden. Tate Modern still houses an electricity transformer substation. The power lines of the National Grid and local distributors are generally routed underground, see for example Tunnels underneath the River Thames. The economic infrastructure includes the 'big six' energy companies: British Gas, Scottish Power, Npower, E. ON, EDF Energy, and SSE, and several smaller companies.

== Gas ==
=== History ===
Gas companies such as the Gas Light and Coke Company were established in London from as early 1812. Gas was principally used for domestic, commercial and street lighting; usage for cooking and heating were developed throughout the nineteenth century. Gas was made by roasting or carbonising coal which drove off a mixture of flammable gases, principally methane, hydrogen and carbon monoxide. The 'town gas' as it was called was stored in large gas holders and distributed to consumers in iron pipes. The carbonisation process also produced valuable by-products such as coke, coal tar and ammoniacal liquor.

Throughout the nineteenth century gas undertakings were established either as municipal undertakings owned and run by local authorities supplying gas to their residents or by authorised companies which supplied gas over a wider geographical area. Some undertakings amalgamated, generally smaller undertakings were taken over by larger companies. Large gas works were built: in 1867 the Gas Light and Coke Company acquired a large site at East Ham where they built Beckton which became the largest gasworks in the world. By 1900 London was mainly supplied by the three 'metropolitan gas companies' these were the Gas Light and Coke Company, the South Metropolitan Company, and the Commercial Company. Three other companies supplied gas to the outer areas of the County of London, namely the Brentford; South Suburban; and the Wandsworth, Wimbledon and Epsom District.

The gas supply industry was nationalised in 1949, under the terms of the Gas Act 1948. The gas undertakings were bought by the government and autonomous area gas boards were established. The County of London was supplied by the North Thames Gas Board (NTGB) and the South Eastern Gas Board (SEGAS). There were gasworks at Beckton, Bow Common, Brentford, Bromley, East Greenwich, Fulham, Harrow, Kensal Green, Nine Elms, Shoreditch, Southall, and Stratford.

The discovery of North Sea gas in 1965 radically changed the industry: London was converted from town gas to natural gas over the period 1973–77. The old gas works were decommissioned and demolished, although large gas holders were still operational into the 2010s, and some have been retained as 'listed' structures.

The gas industry was privatised by the Gas Act 1986 and British Gas plc was floated on the London Stock Exchange in December 1986. The liberalisation of the gas market in the 1990s ended the British Gas supply monopoly and opened the market to energy companies.

=== Current infrastructure ===
Gas is supplied to London from the high pressure National Transmission System (NTS) via four gas offtake stations around London. At the offtake stations the gas pressure is reduced for distribution.

Gas offtake station	Size of feeder pipeline, diameter	Local Distribution Zone
Peters Green, near Luton, Hertfordshire	600 mm	North Thames
Luxborough Lane, Chigwell, Essex	600 mm	North Thames
Tatsfield, near Oxted, Surrey	750 mm	South East
Winkfield, Bracknell Forest	750 mm	North Thames

Gas is distributed by two statutory gas distribution networks (GDNs): Cadent Gas Ltd in North London and SGN in South London. Today gas (and electricity) is available from the 'big six' energy companies: British Gas, Scottish Power, Npower, E. ON, EDF Energy, and SSE, and several smaller companies.

== Water ==
=== History ===
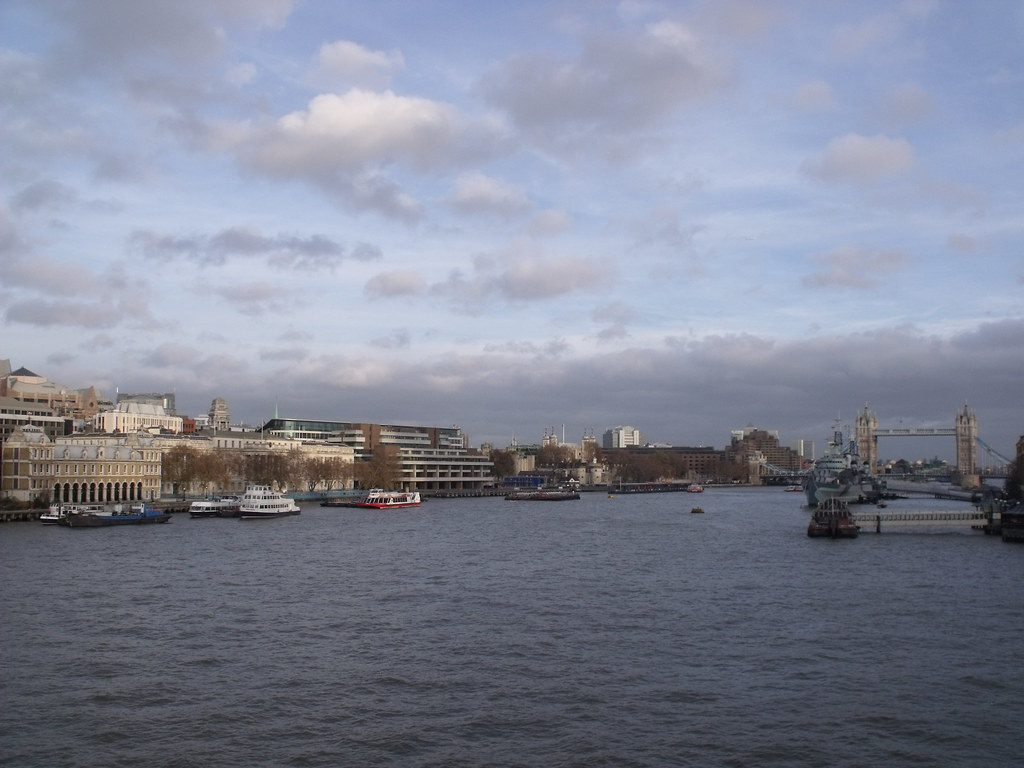
River Thames in southern England

London's water supplies were drawn from the River Thames, the River Lea, the River Brent, the River Colne and springs and wells in the Greater London area. Before 1902 a number of private water companies abstracted, treated and supplied water to their statutory areas. For example, the West Middlesex Waterworks Company supplied the districts of Marylebone and Paddington. From the mid-nineteenth century concerns were raised about the quality of the water supply. Sewage effluent was discharged directly into the tidal river, contaminating the fresh water supply. The Metropolis Water Act 1852 prohibited the abstraction of water for domestic use from the tidal reach of the River Thames, that is from below Teddington Weir. The water companies built water treatment works upriver such as at Hampton.

By the end of the nineteenth century there were eight water companies supplying water to London. The Metropolitan Water Board was established in 1903 to purchase and operate the water facilities of these companies. Water supply was now coordinated by a single authority. The Metropolitan Water Board constructed large raw water storage reservoirs and treatment works in the Lea Valley and to the west of London abstracting water from the Lea and the Thames respectively. These supplies were connected in the 1950s by a 2.6 m diameter tunnel which carried water from the Thames at Hampton to Chingford. Water treatment works were upgraded as new treatment processes were developed. Treatment at water works included rapid gravity filtration, flocculation, sedimentation, dissolved air flotation, slow sand filtration and chlorine and ozone dosing. The Metropolitan Water Board was abolished in 1974 (Water Act 1973) and replaced by the Thames Water Authority. The water industry was privatised in 1989 (Water Act 1989) and the Thames Water Authority became Thames Water, a state regulated private company.

=== Current infrastructure ===
Water usage in London is currently on average about 2.0 Gigalitres per day (2.0 million cubic metres per day). This is supported by infrastructure such as the Thames Water Ring Main (initially built 1988–93 plus extensions) which transfers potable water from six water treatment works and 11 pumping stations for distribution within London. Thames Water currently supplies 76 percent of the population of Greater London, the remainder supplied by Affinity Water, Essex and Suffolk Water, and Sutton and East Surrey Water. The most visible elements of the physical infrastructure are the storage reservoirs in the Lea Valley and along the River Thames west of London.

== Sewage ==
=== History ===
Sewage disposal was historically a problem, causing major pollution of the River Thames and contaminating potable water supplies. London suffered from major outbreaks of cholera and typhus well into the mid-19th century. Indeed, the problem was so severe that Parliament was suspended on occasion due to the stench from the river. These problems were mostly solved when Sir Joseph Bazalgette completed his system of intercepting mains to divert sewage from the Thames to outfalls east of London. Here the sewage would be stored in tanks during the flood tide and discharged untreated into the Thames on the ebb tide to be sweep out to sea. Sewage treatment processes were introduced over time to produce a higher quality discharge. Sewage sludge was dumped at sea until the practice was banned in 1998, sludge is now treated at the sewage works.

=== Current infrastructure ===
The Thames Tideway Tunnel is currently (2020) being constructed to prevent overflow from the intercepting sewers discharging into the Thames during heavy rain.

There are 7 major sewage treatment works serving London:

- Beckton Sewage Treatment Works, Newham, treated waste water discharged into the River Thames
- Beddington Lane Sewage Treatment Works, Croydon, discharge into the Wandle, then the Thames
- Crossness Sewage Treatment Works, Bexley, discharge into the Thames
- Deephams Sewage Treatment Works, Edmonton, discharge into Salmons Brook, then Pymmes Brook, then the Lea
- Deptford Sewage Treatment Works, Deptford, discharge into Deptford Creek then the Thames
- Mogden Sewage Treatment Works, Hounslow, discharge into the Thames
- Riverside Sewage Treatment Works, Havering, discharge into the Thames.

The works provide a range of primary, secondary and tertiary sewage treatment processes. Residual sludge is incinerated at some sites to generate electricity for use in the treatment works.

== Telecommunications ==
There are 188 telephone exchanges in London and all offer ADSL internet services. Most of London, and some adjacent places, are covered by the 020 area code. Some parts of outer London are covered by the 01322, 01689, 01708, 01895, 01923 and 01959 zip codes. There is extensive wireless LAN coverage, especially in central London such as the City of London Corporation, who are developing blanket coverage for the financial district. There is wide coverage from five mobile phone networks of which four are GSM/UMTS and one is UMTS-only.

Most analogue and digital television and radio channels are received throughout the London area from either the Crystal Palace Transmitter or Croydon Transmitter in south London. As of 2012, cable television is widespread with service provided by Virgin Media; however, coverage was not universal at the time. TalkTalk TV provide an expanding video on demand cable television service over ADSL to the London area. Broadband internet and telephone services are also provided by the cable television networks.

With computers and technology playing a key part in the economy, tech and telecommunications companies have created a large number of datacentres within Greater London, many of which are in the Docklands area. As a result, London now hosts key parts of the Internet, including LINX (London INternet eXchange), the largest Internet Exchange Point in the world, carrying over 846 Gbit/s of Internet traffic (as of July 2012).

== Combined Heat and Power and District Heating ==
=== History ===
The first major district heating scheme in London was commissioned by Westminster City Council in 1951 and used heat from Battersea power station to heat 3,200 homes in Pimlico. This system is still operational and uses gas-fired engines and gas-fired boilers to supply electricity and heat.

=== Current Infrastructure ===
Combined heat and power (CHP) and district heating (DH) schemes are encouraged by Greater London Authority policies: there is an expectation that 25 per cent of the heat and power used in London should be generated by localised decentralised energy systems by 2025.

There are many schemes in London ranging from the 35 MW SELCHP and other energy from waste plants (see section on Solid Waste), to local schemes such as:

- Camden Lock Energy Centre & District Heating Network, Camden, provides heating and cooling for 195 residential dwellings, a cinema and commercial premises.
- Rouel Road District Heating Network, Southwark, was originally installed when the estate was being constructed in 1977. It was replaced by a modern system in 2015.
- London Cittigen District Heating Scheme is a 'tri-generation' CHP plant at Smithfield, Islington, it supplies heat and cooling to ten properties including Guildhall, Smithfield Market and the Barbican Centre, as well as private customers. Chilled water is generated by absorption chillers, electricity is sold to the local distribution grid.

== Solid waste ==
Solid waste was historically sent to landfill sites which were often quarries, worked-out sand and gravel pits or low-value marshland. The European Union Landfill Directive (Council Directive 1999/31/EC of 26 April 1999) regulates waste management of landfill sites. This was a significant influence on the development of Material Recovery Facilities to recover material from solid waste that could be recycled and reused. Unrecoverable material is sent to landfill or to Energy from Waste, or Waste to Energy, facilities.

There are four Energy from Waste incinerator plants that serve London:

- Lakeside EfW, Colnbrook Slough
- London EcoPark, Edmonton
- Riverside 1, Belvedere
- South East London Combined Heat and Power (SELCHP) plant, South Bermondsey.

The following landfill sites are, or have recently been, used to dispose of solid waste material from London. The mode of transfer to the site, if not by road, is as shown.

- Appleford, Oxfordshire, railway
- Arlesey, Central Bedfordshire
- Brogborough, Central Bedfordshire
- Brookhurstwood, Warnham, West Sussex
- Calvert, Buckinghamshire, railway
- Mucking, Thurrock, barge
- Pitsea, Essex, barge
- Rainham, London Borough of Havering, barge
- Stewartby, Central Bedfordshire

There are several sites in London for the transfer and treatment of construction, demolition and excavation materials.

== Liquid fuels ==
Liquid fuels – petrol, diesel, liquefied petroleum gas (LPG), aviation kerosene, and heating oil – are produced at UK refineries and imported from abroad. A number of terminals on the River Thames east of London transfer liquid fuels from ships into storage tanks. Road tankers are filled from storage for delivery to petrol stations and industrial users. Liquid fuels are also transported in pipelines.

There are 8 liquid fuel terminals on the River Thames, from West to East these are:

- Dagenham, Stolthaven Dagenham Ltd. London Borough of Barking and Dagenham
- Purfleet, ExxonMobil, Thurrock, Essex
- West Thurrock, Navigator Terminals UK Ltd, Thurrock, Essex
- Grays, InterTerminals, Thurrock, Essex
- Shell Haven, Shell Haven Terminal, Shell Oil, Stanford-le-Hope, Thurrock, Essex
- Coryton, Thames Oilport, Greenergy & Shell, Stanford-le-Hope, Thurrock, Essex
- Canvey, Oikos Storage Ltd., Canvey Island, Essex
- Canvey, Calor Gas Terminal, Canvey Island, Essex

The Esso West London Oil Terminal (also known as Staines terminal) is in the London Borough of Hounslow. It has storage facilities for aviation fuel delivered from Fawley Refinery near Southampton by a 105 km underground pipeline. Aviation fuel is transferred to Heathrow Airport.

Heathrow is also served by the Colnbrook Rail Terminal a rail offloading facility for freight trains from oil refineries and terminals. Aviation fuel is fed to the Northern Fuel Receipt Facility at the Airport via a 1.9 km 12-inch diameter pipeline.

London is also served by fuel depots at Buncefield Hertfordshire and Theale West Berkshire.
