= Map Men =

Geography edutainment series

- Logo since Series 3
- Genre: Geography; Comedy
- Created by: Jay Foreman; Mark Cooper-Jones
- Written by: Jay Foreman; Mark Cooper-Jones
- Presented by: Jay Foreman; Mark Cooper-Jones
- Country of origin: United Kingdom
- Original language: English
- No. of series: 5
- No. of episodes: 38 (list of episodes)

Production
- Running time: 2–14 minutes

Original release
- Network: YouTube
- Release: 4 May 2016 – present

Map Men is a British edutainment YouTube series, created, written, and presented by Jay Foreman and Mark Cooper-Jones. A mix of comedy and geography, its videos regularly attract 1 to 5 million views on YouTube.

== Premise ==
The series is created, written, and presented by Jay Foreman and Mark Cooper-Jones. Mark Cooper-Jones is a former geography teacher, and the pair met at the Edinburgh Festival Fringe, where both were performing in 2009 or 2010. The series started in 2016, and has aired on the Map Men (formerly Jay Foreman, then Jay and Mark) YouTube channel for five series, alongside a series of specials relating to Geoguessr and Ordnance Survey. The episodes are a mix of comedy and geography, with each episode answering a short geographical question, often involving maps. The style has been compared to Horrible Histories and the pair cite their inspiration as Monty Python. The videos feature deadpan, split-second visual gags, and comic sketches. The title for the series, "Map Men", was coined by Cooper-Jones as a pun name based on the American drama series, "Mad Men".

The pair have attributed the show's success to the growing redundancy of maps as an everyday item, making them a more "geeky" topic. They attribute the channel's success to its unique mix of comedy and geography. In 2021, the series was nominated under the "learning and education" category for the 11th Streamy Awards, losing to Veritasium. In 2024, an edited version of the video about why some British place-names are hard to pronounce won 'Video of the Year' in the inaugural UK and Ireland TikTok Awards.

In October 2025, the duo released the book This Way Up: When Maps Go Wrong (And Why It Matters) (ISBN 978-0-3697-7503-0).

== Episodes ==
Series	Episodes	Originally released	
Series	Episodes	First released	Last released
1	6	4 May 2016	7 August 2016
2	5	15 April 2019	2 September 2019
3	11	16 November 2020	13 September 2021
4	7	10 July 2023	31 August 2024
Specials	3 (Note: Includes the sponsored episode "Map Men vs. Geoguessr", as well as two sponsored shorts about the Ordnance Survey, all of which were released between series 4 and 5 and were produced outside of the standard episode production cycle.)	13 October 2024	30 June 2025
5	7	15 September 2025	21 September 2026
Special	1 (Note: Includes the single episode "Map Men vs Geoguessr 2: Mark's Revenge?".)	9 March 2026	

== Awards and nominations ==
Year	Award	Category	Result	Ref.
2021	11th Streamy Awards	Learning and Education	Nominated	
2024	1st UK and Ireland TikTok awards	Video of the Year	Won	
