= D. J. James =

American football player (born 2001)

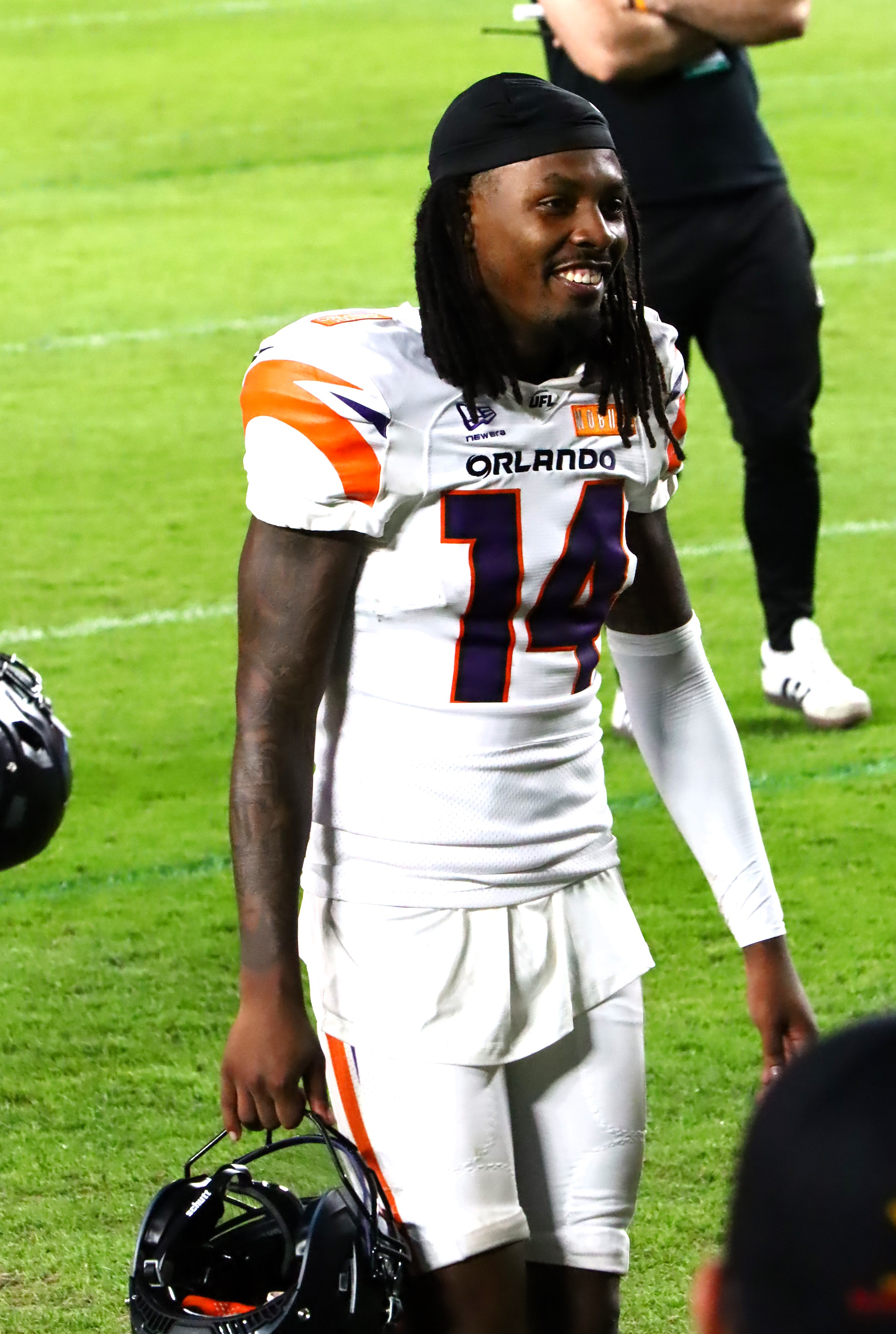
- James with the Orlando Storm in 2026

Profile
- Position: Cornerback

Personal information
- Born: March 5, 2001 (age 25); Mobile, Alabama, U.S.
- Listed height: 6 ft 0 in (1.83 m)
- Listed weight: 175 lb (79 kg)

Career information
- High school: Spanish Fort (Spanish Fort, Alabama)
- College: Oregon (2019–2021); Auburn (2022–2023)
- NFL draft: 2024: 6th round, 192nd overall pick

Career history
- Seattle Seahawks (2024)*; New England Patriots (2024–2025); Orlando Storm (2026); New York Giants (2026)*
- * Offseason or practice squad member only

Awards and highlights
- Second-team All-SEC (2022)
- Stats at Pro Football Reference

Desmond "D. J." James (born March 5, 2001) is an American professional football cornerback. He played college football for the Oregon Ducks and Auburn Tigers.

== Early life ==
James grew up in Mobile, Alabama and attended Spanish Fort High School. He was rated a three-star recruit and initially committed to play college football at Mississippi State. James later flipped his commitment to Oregon.

== College career ==
James began his college career at Oregon. He had 46 tackles, two interceptions, and four passes broken up as a junior. Following the season, James entered the NCAA transfer portal.

James ultimately chose to transfer to Auburn. He was named second-team All-Southeastern Conference (SEC) in his first season with the Tigers after making 37 tackles with one interception and eight passes broken up.

James had his signature moment when playing against the Western Kentucky Hilltoppers, when he got his first interception for the Tigers and returned it 27 yards for a touchdown, cutting in front of the quarterback, Austin Reed. James ran through the middle and followed his blockers to flip into the end zone for a pick-six.

== Professional career ==
Pre-draft measurables
| Height | Weight | Arm length | Hand span | Wingspan | 40-yard dash | 10-yard split | 20-yard split | 20-yard shuttle | Three-cone drill | Broad jump |
|---|---|---|---|---|---|---|---|---|---|---|
| 5 ft 11 5/8 in (1.82 m) | 175 lb (79 kg) | 31 in (0.79 m) | 8 3/8 in (0.21 m) | 6 ft 0 3/8 in (1.84 m) | 4.42 s | 1.50 s | 2.58 s | 4.41 s | 7.28 s | 10 ft 6 in (3.20 m) |
All values from NFL Combine/Pro Day

=== Seattle Seahawks ===
James was selected by the Seattle Seahawks with the 192nd overall pick in the sixth round in the 2024 NFL draft.

On July 18, 2024, James was placed on the active/NFI list. He was waived on August 27 as part of final roster cuts.

=== New England Patriots ===
On September 16, 2024, James was signed to the New England Patriots' practice squad. He signed a reserve/future contract with New England on January 6, 2025. James made the Patriots initial 53-man roster in 2025, but was waived on September 9.

=== Orlando Storm ===
On May 8, 2026, James signed with the Orlando Storm of the United Football League (UFL).

=== New York Giants ===
On August 4, 2026, James signed with the New York Giants after a successful workout. He was put on injured reserve on August 15. On September 1, James was released from injured reserve with an injury settlement.
