= Spanish Fort High School =

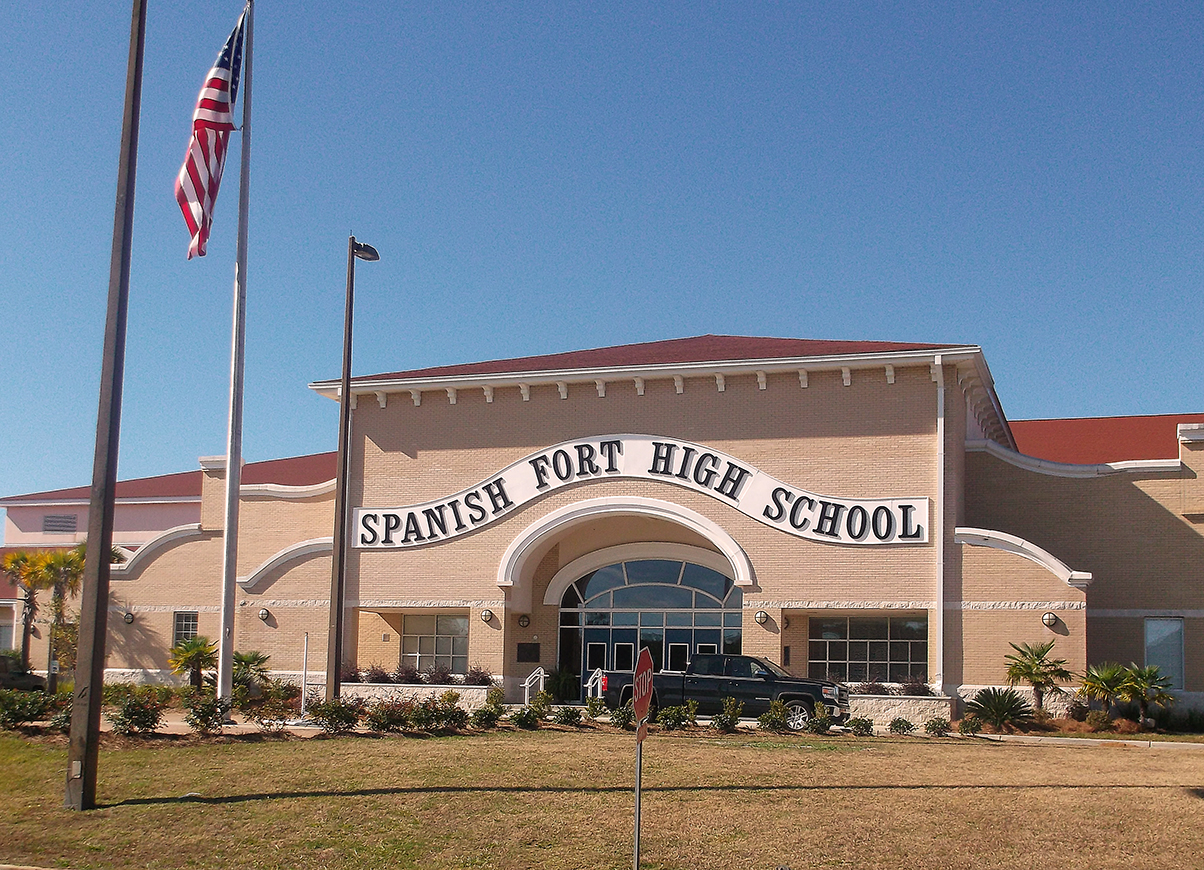
- Spanish Fort High School's main building

Location
- 1 Plaza de Toros; Spanish Fort, Alabama 36527; United States; 30°41′20″N 87°51′14″W

Information
- School type: Public
- Opened: 2005 (21 years ago)
- School district: Baldwin County Public Schools
- CEEB code: 012518
- NCES School ID: 0100270
- Principal: Shannon Smith
- Teaching staff: 65.89 (on a FTE basis)
- Grades: 9-12
- Enrollment: 1,202 (2023-2024)
- Student to teacher ratio: 18.24
- Campus type: Suburban
- Colors: Red and black
- Athletics conference: AHSAA 6A
- Nickname: Toros
- Website: www.spanishforttoros.org

Spanish Fort High School is a high school in Spanish Fort, Alabama, United States that was founded in 2005 and graduated its first class in 2008. The school serves grades 9-12 and is part of the Baldwin County Public Schools.

== Campus ==
The campus includes a main building with library, cafeteria, art, band, and choral rooms. The school was approved and funded in 2005. An athletic complex includes a football stadium, baseball field, softball field, track and field facilities, and a band practice field.

== Demographics ==
The demographic breakdown of the 1,202 students enrolled for 2023–2024 school year was:

- Male - 52.66%
- Female - 47.33%
- Native American or Alaskan Native - 0.17%
- Asian American- 1.41%
- Pacific Islanders - 0.00%
- Black - 5.91%
- Hispanic - 6.66%
- White - 78.96%
- Multiracial - 6.91%

24.12% of the students were eligible for free or reduced lunch.

== Athletics ==
Spanish Fort High School is classified as a 6A school by the Alabama High School Athletic Association. The school's nickname is the Toros and the school colors are red and black. The following sanctioned sports are offered:

- Baseball (boys)
- Basketball (boys and girls)
- Bowling (boys and girls)
- Cheerleading (girls)
- Competitive cheer (girls)
- Cross country (boys and girls)
- Football (boys)
- Golf (boys and girls)
- Soccer (boys and girls)
- Softball (girls)
- Swimming and diving (boys and girls)
- Tennis (boys and girls)
- Track and field (boys and girls)
- Volleyball (girls)
- Wrestling (boys)

The school won the state football championship in 2010, 2012, 2013, and 2015. Spanish Fort won the state 5A baseball playoffs in 2010, 2011, 2012, and 2014. In 2009 the school took top state honors in Track and Field competition. In 2012, the Spanish Fort girls were the 5A state champions in Soccer

In 2017, the University of South Florida sent a letter alleging that the SFHS fighting bull logo was identical to the USF logo but with different colors. SFHS agreed to change the logo starting with the 2017–2018 school year.

== Notable alumni ==
- D. J. James, professional football cornerback for the New England Patriots
- Kris Abrams-Draine, professional football cornerback for the Denver Broncos
- Jalen Wayne, professional football wide receiver for the Montreal Alouettes
- Trevor Rainbolt, social media personality
