= Trevor Rainbolt =

American YouTuber and streamer (born 1998)

- Born: November 7, 1998 (age 28)
- Education: Spanish Fort High School; University of Colorado Colorado Springs (dropped out)
- Occupations: Live streamer; YouTuber; TikToker; GeoGuessr

TikTok information
- Page: georainbolt
- Followers: 3.2 million

YouTube information
- Channels: Rainbolt; Rainbolt Two
- Years active: 2020–present
- Subscribers: 1.2 million (Rainbolt); 1.92 million (Rainbolt Two)
- Views: 122.3 million (Rainbolt); 867.71 million (Rainbolt Two)
- Last updated: November 20, 2026
- Website: georainbolt.com

Trevor Rainbolt (born November 7, 1998), known mononymously as Rainbolt, is an American social media personality and player of GeoGuessr, an online geography game. He initially gained popularity through posting GeoGuessr gameplay videos on TikTok, which often involved difficult challenges or self-imposed limitations, and often showed him making highly accurate guesses at high speeds. He posts videos on YouTube about the game and other geography-related topics.

== Early and personal life ==
Trevor Rainbolt was born on November 7, 1998. He went to school in Flippin, Arkansas and moved to Alabama for twelfth grade, graduating from Spanish Fort High School. He enrolled in university for one year at the University of Colorado Colorado Springs before dropping out to work in Los Angeles as a social media strategist. His first employer ran sports entertainment accounts on Instagram, TikTok, and Snapchat.

He had only left the United States once briefly until November 2022, when he announced that he would be living in a different country each month, starting in Ratingen, Germany, followed by Spain and Portugal. As of March 2025, he is living in Bangkok, Thailand.

== Career ==
Rainbolt started honing his GeoGuessr skills during the COVID-19 pandemic by playing for four to five hours every day, studying landmarks like signs and telephone poles, and watching others livestream. At some points, he was playing up to 12-hour days, stating in an interview that he dreamt in Street View. Rainbolt posts on TikTok under the username "georainbolt", an account he started in October 2021. He has also hosted pro GeoGuessr tournament live streams on Twitch. He gained prominence for his self-imposed challenges added to the GeoGuessr structure, including seeing the image for only a tenth of a second, with half the image blurred, with two photos at once, among others. In some videos, he identifies the location while blindfolded or with someone else describing the scene to him. He has identified countries based only on viewing the dirt or the sky.

"Once you see the countries and their soil colors [...] it's just human intuition [...] can I describe to you why I think that it looked like it was Nigerian soil? Probably not, but it does. It's just part of that sixth sense you pick up on when you play the game so much."

— Rainbolt to The Washington Post

He revealed the 2023 New York Jets schedule using street view to determine the home cities of the Jets' opponents, in collaboration with the Jets' social media. In June 2023, after seeing a TikTok video of an egg sandwich, Rainbolt spent nearly 100 hours tracking down the bagel shop. The restaurant, Bagel Market in Manhattan, then named the sandwich after Rainbolt. In April 2023, Rainbolt privately rented a billboard in Boston, Massachusetts, with his logo and face. Local news stories began reporting after several social media accounts shared images of the billboard, which read "This is Boston. Nice."

In October 2023, Rainbolt served as a commentator for the inaugural GeoGuessr World Cup, which drew over 70,000 viewers. He also commentated for the 2024 edition. In 2025, Rainbolt was inducted in the Games section of the Forbes 30 Under 30.
