= GeoGuessr World Championship =

Esports tournament series

- Most recent season or competition: GeoGuessr World Championship 2026
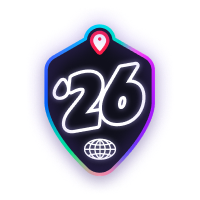
- Game: GeoGuessr
- Founded: 2023; 3 years ago
- First season: 2023
- Owner: GeoGuessr AB
- Country: Global
- Most recent champion: (Hungary) Debre (1st title)
- Website: www.geoguessr.com/world-championship

The GeoGuessr World Championship is the top level of professional GeoGuessr competition worldwide. The single-player in-person esports event is organized by GeoGuessr. The first two editions, held in Stockholm in 2023 and 2024, were branded as the GeoGuessr World Cup. In 2025, GeoGuessr AB restructured the competitive ecosystem and officially rebranded the event as the GeoGuessr World Championship, reflecting the introduction of a broader seasonal format and professional circuit.

== History ==
After co-sponsoring the GeoGuessr Team World Cup in October 2022 to great success, the company launched their own official edition of the event for individual competitors. World Championships and other official events, such as regional qualifiers and finals, have been hosted annually since 2023 and broadcast to sites like Twitch.

== Format ==
The format of the World Cup (2023, 2024) was divided into several stages. All participants took part in the group phase. The best player from each group advanced directly to the quarter-finals, while the second and third-placed players competed in an intermediate stage for a chance to qualify as well. The tournament continued with the semi-finals and the final, which determined the overall winner. All matches were duels played over 10 rounds of 60 seconds each.

In the year 2025, the GeoGuessr World Championship adopted a single-elimination tournament format. Players competed in best-of-five duels, with the winner advancing to the next stage. The tournament progressed through the quarter-finals, semi-finals, a third-place match, and concluded with the Grand Final. A third-place match determined the third and fourth positions.

In 2026, the group stage was reintroduced. In this format, 24 players are divided into 4 groups, playing a best-of-three duel against every other player in their group. The top four players from each group advance to the knockout round. The tournament then proceeds in best-of-five duels through the round of 16, the quarterfinals, the semifinals, the third-place match, and the final.

Matches are played on standard and specialized formats that are integrated into the browser game GeoGuessr and are typical of it: Move (Players can move around the map in the Street View Image, pan, and zoom) No Move (Players cannot move, but can pan and zoom), and NMPZ (No Move, Pan, or Zoom). In a best-of-three match, the games are played in the order Move, No Move, and NMPZ, while in a best-of-five match, the games are played in the order Move, No Move, Move, No Move, and NMPZ. The players start each game with 5,000 health points. Depending on how close they are to the exact location (the “5k”) in each round, they are awarded points ranging from 0 to 5,000. The player with the higher score subtracts the difference between their score and their opponent’s score from the opponent’s health bar. Starting in the 2026 season, the player who wins a round also receives a 0.5x multiplier, which increases the damage they deal in subsequent rounds of the same game. The player who is the first to reduce their opponent’s health to 0 wins the game and, consequently, a point in a best-of-three or best-of-five format.

Logo of the GeoGuessr World League, the primary qualifying competition.

The event features regional representation, with players from the Americas, Asia-Pacific, Europe, the Middle East, and Africa qualifying through preliminary stages. Starting in 2025, qualification has been determined primarily through the GeoGuessr World League. In the 2026 season, the World League was divided into three regional competitions: the Americas, APAC, and EMEA. Throughout the World League season, players competed in matchdays organized according to a Swiss system to secure qualifying spots for the World Championship Finals. In Europe, 20 players participated in the league, eight of whom qualified directly, while in APAC and the Americas, four out of twelve qualified in each region. Additional players were able to qualify through play-in and wildcard tournaments, which provided extra opportunities for players who had not qualified directly through the World League.

== Events ==
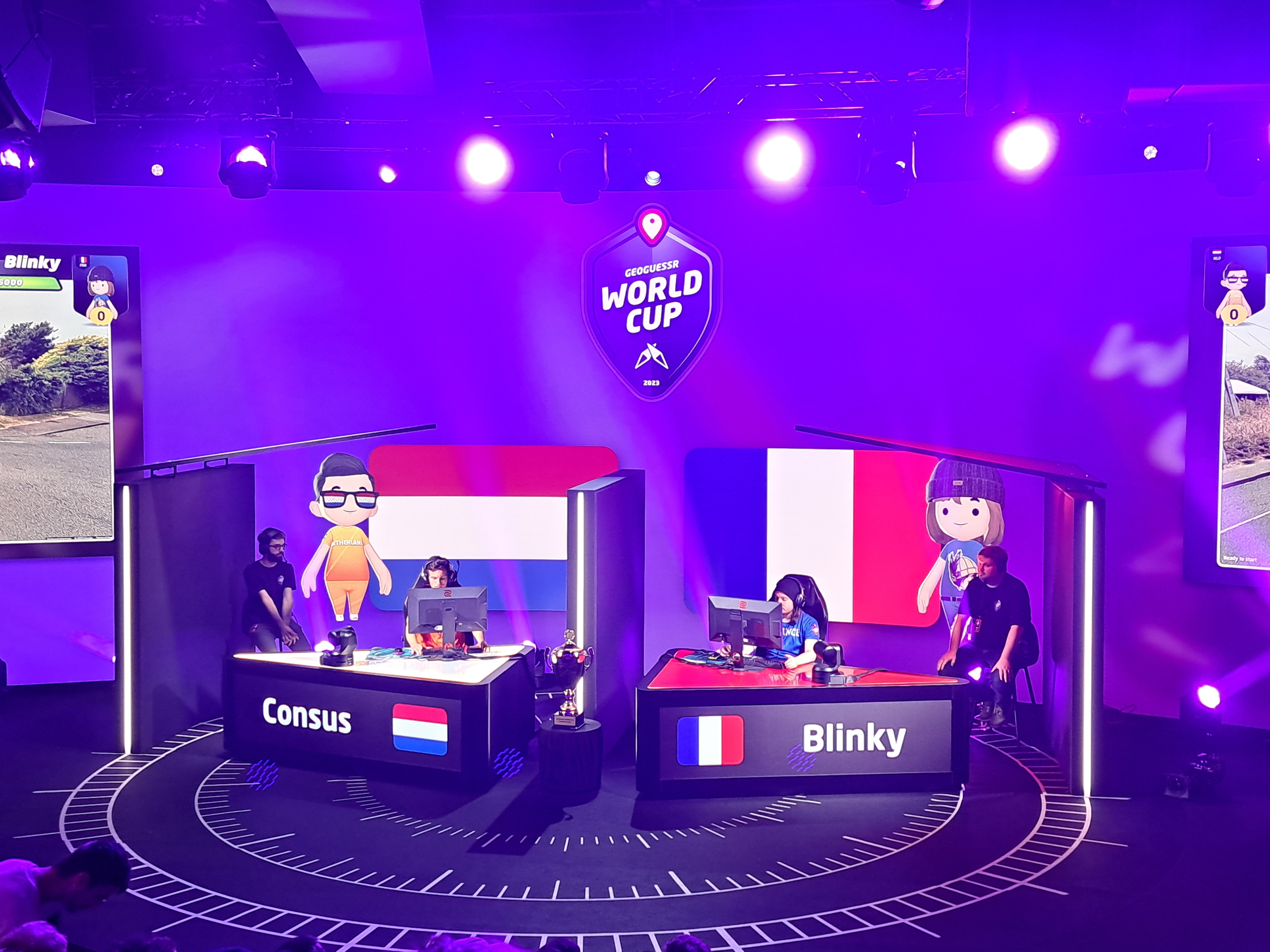
Consus (NL) and Blinky (FR) on the finals stage of the GeoGuessr World Cup 2023

=== GeoGuessr World Cup 2023 ===
On 13–14 October 2023, GeoGuessr hosted the inaugural GeoGuessr World Cup at SPACE Arena in Stockholm. The tournament featured 24 participants representing 21 countries, with a US $50,000 prize pool. The event was broadcast on Twitch, with commentary from streamers such as Trevor Rainbolt, Mohan Govindasamy, and Pala Gilroy Sen. The tournament was eventually won by Dutch player Patrick "Consus" Noordijk, who defeated French player Mathieu "Blinky" Huet in the finals.

=== GeoGuessr World Cup 2024 ===
The second World Cup took place from 11–14 September 2024, beginning with a group knock-out stage. The final was held at the Blue Hall at Stockholm City Hall, internationally known as the venue of the Nobel Banquet. It concluded with 2023 runner-up Blinky winning 3–2 over US player Robert "MK" Falconio, taking home $27,555 as a first-place prize.

=== GeoGuessr World Championship 2025 ===
The third event, rebranded as World Championship, took place from 29–30 August 2025, with a prize pool of US$109,433. The tournament featured 16 participants with a single-elimination tournament format. The final was held at the K.B. Hallen in Copenhagen. The tournament concluded with US player Radu "Radu C" Casapu (Note: Player Radu C "RC" has played under both the Romanian and US flag.) defeating Attila "Debre" Szabolcs 3–2 in the final, thereby winning the US $49,433 prize for first place. Defending champion Mathieu "Blinky" Huet, for whom the 2025 final remains the only one he has not participated in to date, was eliminated in the quarterfinals by the Australian player Joseph "Leero" Gansemer. The 2025 edition marked a turning point for GeoGuessr esports, with significantly larger production value, expanded sponsorship presence, and increased mainstream media coverage.

=== GeoGuessr World Championship 2026 ===
2023 champion Consus was crowned as the inaugural world champion.

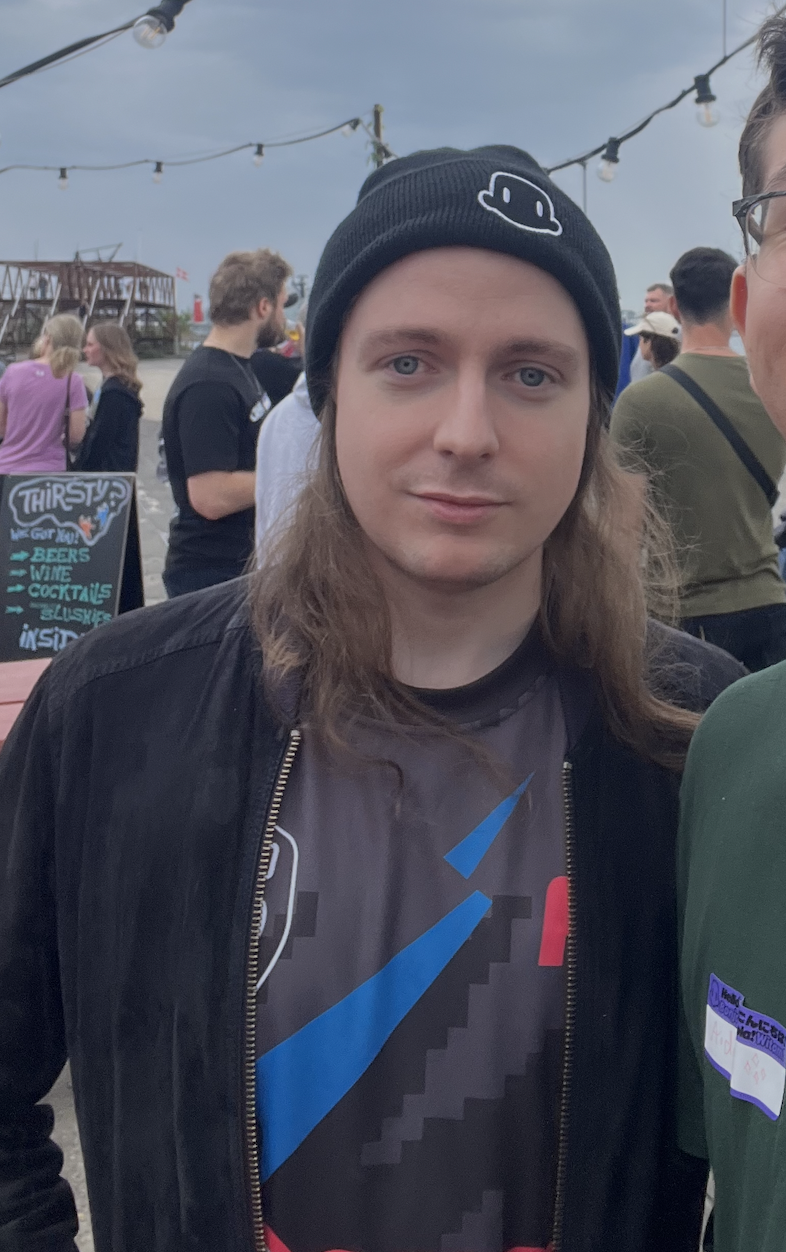
2024 champion Blinky holds the record for most grand finals appearances at three.

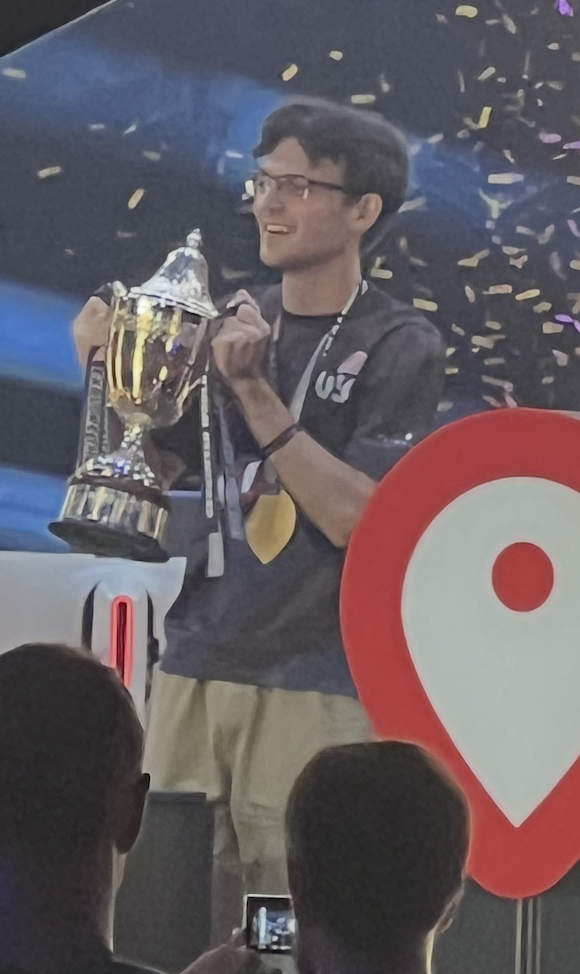
2025 champion Radu C is the only non-European champion.

2026 champion Debre is the reigning world champion.

The fourth edition of the World Championship took place from 2–5 September 2026 at the Tempodrom in Berlin, Germany. The total prize pool was $105,427 and the championship featured 24 players competing for the world title. The first two days consisted of group-stage matches held in the fan zone surrounding the Tempodrom, followed by a single-elimination playoff stage during the final two days. The playoffs included a bronze-medal match and culminated in the grand final on 5 September. The tournament concluded with Hungarian player Debre taking first place after pulling off the reverse sweep from 0–2 down to defeat French player Blinky 3–2 in the finals. As a result, Debre received $30,000 as a winner's prize. The 2026 championship was held as part of a four-day GeoGuessr community festival, featuring a fan zone, gaming area, partner expo and other activities. Reigning world champion Radu C was among the 24 players competing to defend his title. He reached the playoffs after finishing first in his group, but was eliminated in the round of 16 by 2023 champion Consus.

== Seasons ==
Ed.	Year	Venue	Final			Semi-finalists		Participants
Ed.	Year	Venue	Winner	Score	Runner-up	Third place	Fourth place	Participants
1	2023	(Sweden) Space Arena, Stockholm	(Netherlands) Consus	3–1	(France) Blinky	(Canada) Fau (Romania) Radu C		24
2	2024	(Sweden) Stockholm City Hall, Stockholm	(France) Blinky	3–2	(United States) MK	(Canada) Fau (Brazil) Orlando		24
3	2025	(Denmark) K.B. Hallen, Copenhagen	(United States) Radu C	3–2	(Hungary) Debre	(Poland) Strefan	(Australia) Leero	16
4	2026	(Germany) Tempodrom, Berlin	(Hungary) Debre	3–2	(France) Blinky	(France) Kratsooo	(United States) MK	24
5	2027	(France) / (Netherlands) TBA	TBD					

== All-time medal table ==
The table below shows the all-time medal standings at the GeoGuessr World Championship by country. It includes results from all editions of the championship.

No.	Nation	Gold	Silver	Bronze	Hist. 3rd places (Note: Losing semifinalists at the first two editions, where no bronze-medal match was held. These placements are not counted as bronze medals.)	Total
1	France	1	2	1	0	4
2	United States	1	1	0	0	2
2	Hungary	1	1	0	0	2
4	Netherlands	1	0	0	0	1
5	Poland	0	0	1	0	1
6	Canada	0	0	0	2	2
7	Brazil	0	0	0	1	1
7	Romania	0	0	0	1	1
