= Jay Foreman =

English comedian, YouTuber and musician (born 1984)

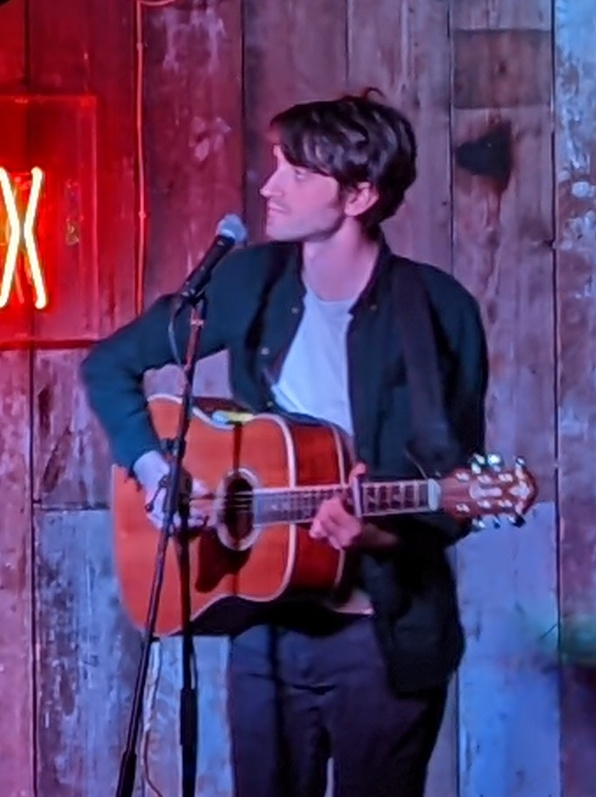
- Foreman headline performing at the Musical Comedy Awards 2022
- Born: 4 October 1984 (age 42); Stanmore, London, England
- Education: University of York
- Spouse: Jade Nagi (m. 2021)
- Children: 2
- Relatives: Beardyman (brother)
- Musical career
- Genre: Musical comedy
- Instruments: Vocals; guitar
- Years active: 2005–present
- Website: www.jayforeman.co.uk

YouTube information
- Channel: Map Men
- Years active: 2006–present
- Subscribers: 1.83 million
- Views: 290 million
- Last updated: 10 November 2026

Jay Foreman (born 4 October 1984) is an English comedian, educator, documentarian, YouTuber, and singer-songwriter.

== Early life ==
Foreman was born on 4 October 1984. He was raised in a Jewish household in Stanmore, in the London Borough of Harrow, with his brother and sister. His brother Darren is a beatboxer and musician going under the pseudonym Beardyman, with whom he sometimes collaborates onstage.

From 1996 to 2003, Foreman was educated at Queen Elizabeth's School, a state grammar school for boys in Barnet, north London, followed by the University of York, where he began performing comedy songs on acoustic guitar in 2005.

== Career ==
=== Comedy ===
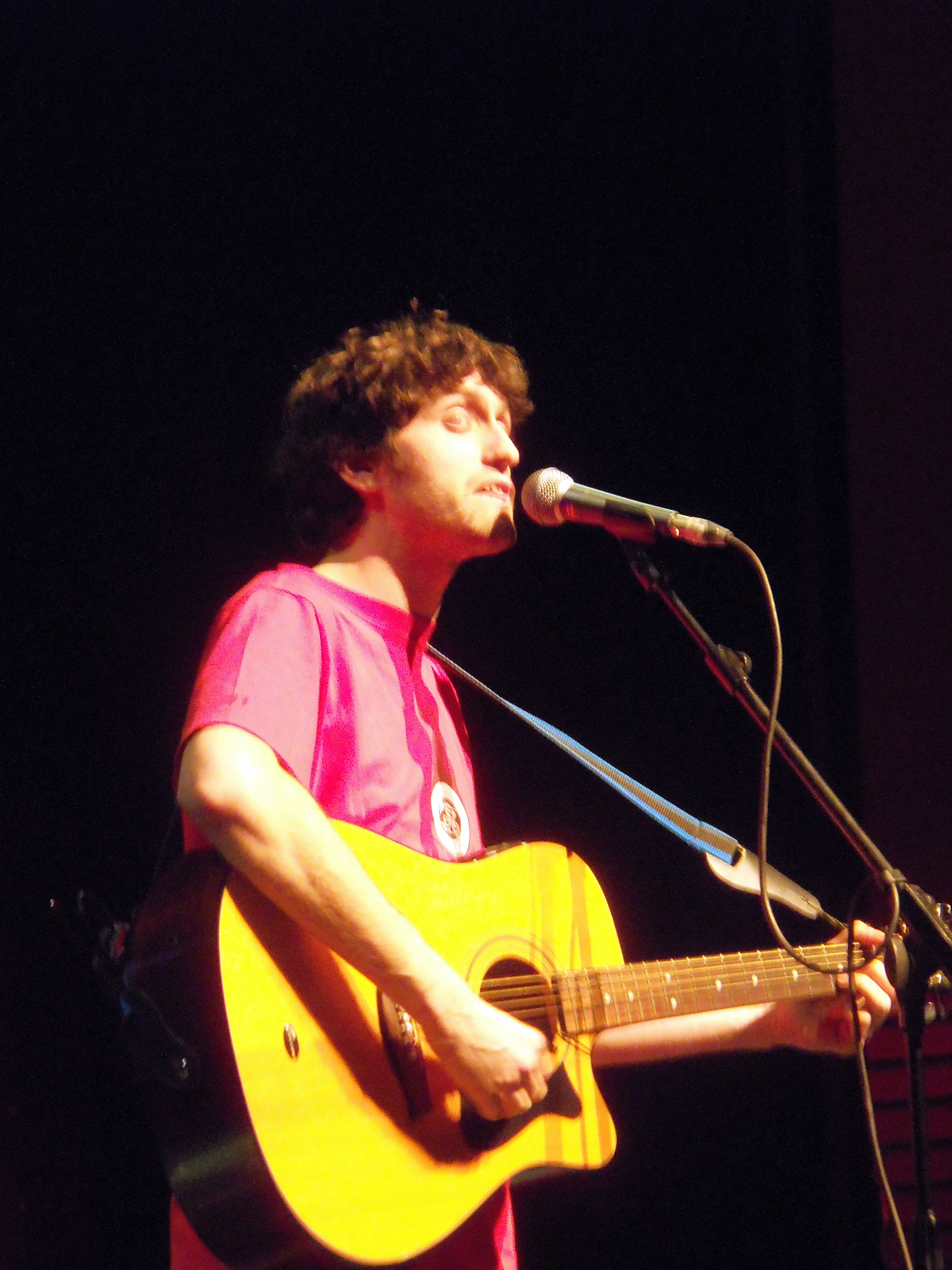
Foreman performing in 2011

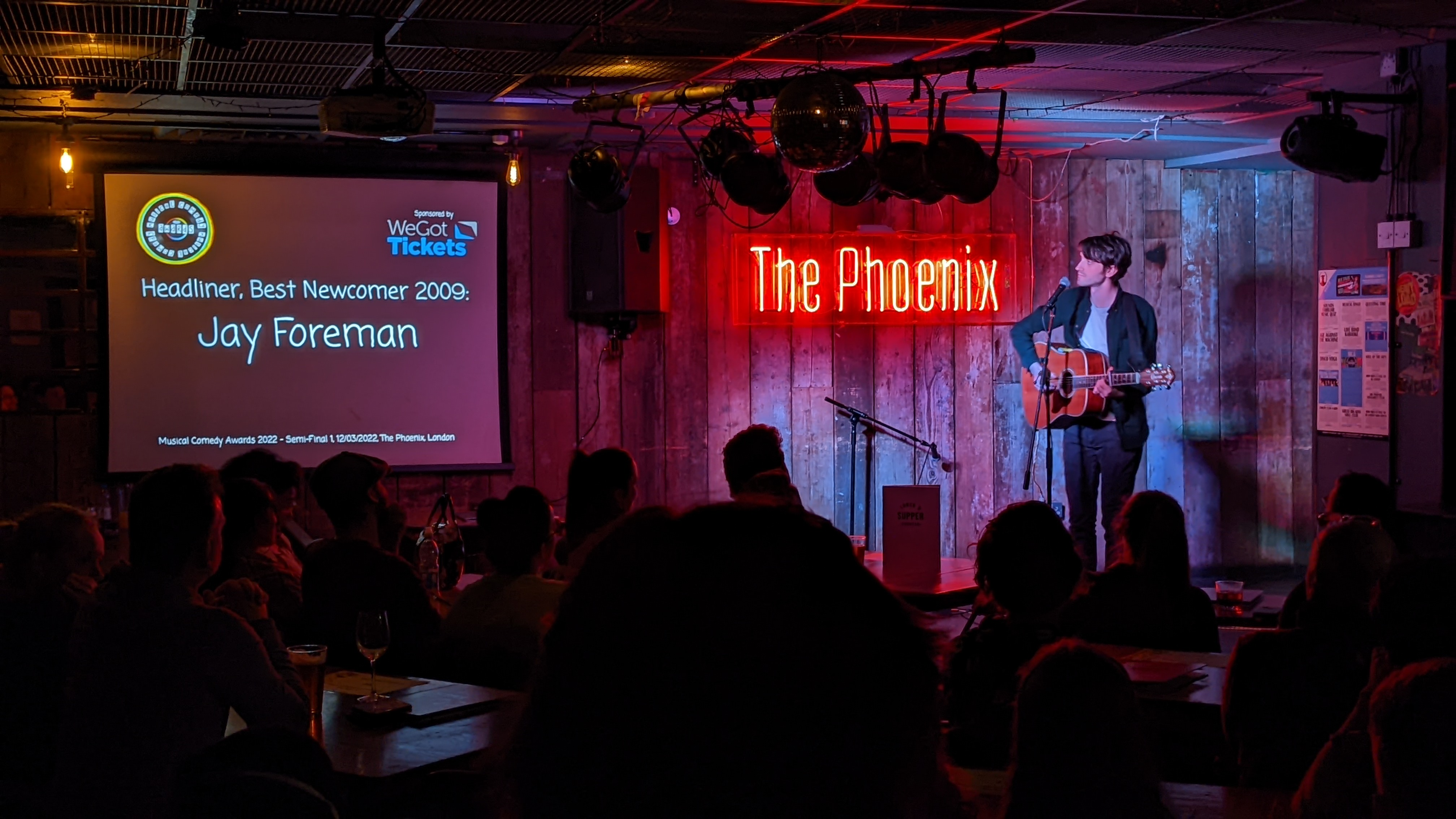
Foreman performing at the Musical Comedy Awards 2022

Foreman was featured as the BBC New Talent Pick of the Fringe 2007, won Best Newcomer at the Tuborg Musical Comedy awards 2009, and came third at the Musical Comedy Awards 2010. In 2009, Foreman contributed jingles to the weekly comedy podcast Answer Me This!, and in 2011 and 2012, supported comedian Dave Gorman on Dave Gorman's PowerPoint Presentation tour.

Foreman presented The General Election Xplained, a series of educational videos to explain the election process for schoolchildren in Key Stages 3 to 5.

For several years, he has also performed shows at the Edinburgh Festival Fringe, which include Disgusting Songs For Revolting Children (And Other Funny Stories), No More Colours and Mixtape.

Jay Foreman's songs have featured on BBC Radio 4, Radio 4 Extra, The One Show, and London Live. In Spring 2027, he will appear in the ninth series of the BBC show Pilgrimage.

=== YouTube ===
Foreman created his YouTube channel in April 2006. Its content focuses on a variety of comic educational series such as Unfinished London, Politics Unboringed, and Map Men (presented with Mark Cooper-Jones), as well as music videos for his songs and clips from his comedy shows. In September 2025, the name of the channel was changed from "Jay Foreman" to "Jay and Mark", and later to "Map Men", to represent Mark Cooper-Jones's involvement, particularly in the web series 'Map Men'.

==== Unfinished London ====
Unfinished London is an educational mini-series which premiered in 2009. Foreman created and co-writes the series with Paul Kendler, who often features within the episodes themselves. As of May 2026, there are 15 episodes, with the most recent being released in 2022. The series premiered on YouTube with each episode or set of handling a specific area of the evolution of London's infrastructure, urban planning, and local government. The series was initially only meant to exist as a single episode to function as a skills showcase but the reception convinced Foreman to continue making them.

==== Politics Unboringed ====
Politics Unboringed was a series of educational YouTube videos that ran between 2015 and 2017. Each episode is roughly five minutes long and handles various topics relating to British politics. Foreman has no plans to bring the series back, stating that "with everything that's going on, I now find it impossible, irresponsible even, to maintain the cheery, neutral tone that the series used to have."

==== Map Men ====
Map Men is an edutainment mini-series which premiered in 2016. Foreman writes and presents the show with its co-creator Mark Cooper-Jones. A mix of comedy and geography, its videos regularly attract 1–5 million views on YouTube. In October 2025, the duo released the book This Way Up: When Maps Go Wrong (And Why It Matters).

== Personal life ==
Foreman married Jade Nagi in 2021. They have two sons, born in July 2022 and November 2023. He also has two siblings; a brother, musician Darren Foreman aka Beardyman, and a sister. Foreman's family is Jewish, and in a statement written for the London Jewish News in 2018, he described his fondness for his family's Jewish traditions, even though Foreman himself is an atheist.

== Filmography ==
Year	Title	Role	Notes
2009–2022	Unfinished London	Presenter	Co-writer and creator alongside Paul Kendler
2015–2017	Politics Unboringed	Presenter	Writer and creator of the series
2016	Go For It	Contestant	Series: 1, Episode: 5
2016–present	Map Men	Co-presenter	Co-writer and creator alongside Mark Cooper-Jones
2018	BBC Earth Science	Presenter	Presented episode: "Are Cities Smart or Stupid?"
2023	Geography Now	Guest presenter	Guest presenter from the United Kingdom
2024	David Bennett (YouTube channel)	Guest	Video: "Ultimate Beatles Quiz"

== Awards and nominations ==
Year	Award	Category	Work	Result	Ref.
2009	Musical Comedy Awards	Best Newcomer		Won	
2010	Musical Comedy Awards	Main Award		Third place	
2021	11th Streamy Awards	Learning and Education	Map Men	Nominated	
2024	2024 UK and Ireland TikTok Awards	Video of the Year	Map Men	Won	
