= Kris Abrams-Draine =

American football player (born 2001)

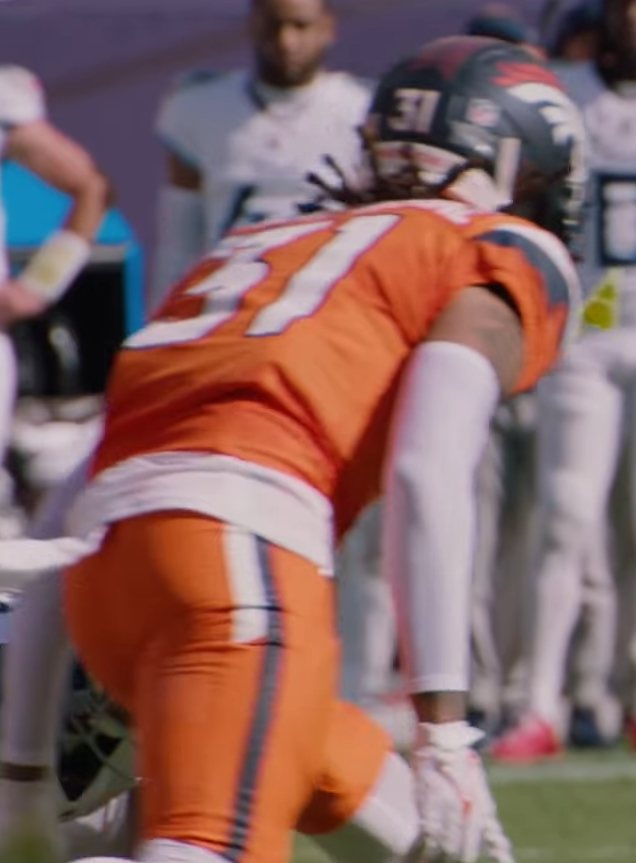
- Abrams-Draine with the Denver Broncos in 2025

No. 31 – Denver Broncos
- Position: Cornerback
- Roster status: Active

Personal information
- Born: October 4, 2001 (age 25); Mobile, Alabama, U.S.
- Listed height: 5 ft 11 in (1.80 m)
- Listed weight: 178 lb (81 kg)

Career information
- High school: Spanish Fort (Spanish Fort, Alabama)
- College: Missouri (2020–2023)
- NFL draft: 2024: 5th round, 145th overall pick

Career history
- Denver Broncos (2024–present)

Awards and highlights
- First-team All-SEC (2023)

Career NFL statistics as of Week 18, 2025
- Total tackles: 39
- Pass deflections: 3
- Interceptions: 1
- Stats at Pro Football Reference

Kris Abrams-Draine (born October 4, 2001) is an American professional football cornerback for the Denver Broncos of the National Football League (NFL). He played college football for the Missouri Tigers.

== Early life ==
Abrams-Draine was bon on October 4, 2001 in Mobile, Alabama. Abrams-Draine attended Spanish Fort High School in Spanish Fort, Alabama where he played wide receiver before switching to quarterback his senior year. As a senior, he passed for 723 yards, rushed for 1,745, and scored 30 total touchdowns. Abrams-Draine was originally committed to play college football at Louisiana State University (LSU) and the University of Mississippi before deciding on the University of Missouri.

== College career ==
After playing in five games as a wide receiver his true freshman year at Missouri in 2020, Abrams-Draine switched to cornerback in 2021. That year he played in all 13 games with 10 starts and had 37 tackles and three interceptions. He returned to Missouri as a starter in 2022.

== Professional career ==
Pre-draft measurables
Height	Weight	Arm length	Hand span	Wingspan	40-yard dash	10-yard split	20-yard split	20-yard shuttle	Three-cone drill	Vertical jump	Broad jump
5 ft 11 3/8 in (1.81 m)	179 lb (81 kg)	31 in (0.79 m)	8 5/8 in (0.22 m)	6 ft 2 5/8 in (1.90 m)	4.44 s	1.53 s	2.58 s	4.41 s	7.15 s	33.5 in (0.85 m)	9 ft 7 in (2.92 m)
All values from NFL Combine/Pro Day

Abrams-Draine was selected in the fifth round with the 145th overall pick by the Denver Broncos in the 2024 NFL draft.

He made his NFL debut during Week 13 against the Cleveland Browns. When veteran cornerback Levi Wallace was benched in the 4th quarter after struggling significantly against former Broncos receiver Jerry Jeudy, Abrams-Draine filled in as the outside corner opposite Patrick Surtain II for the remainder of the game. The Broncos would eventually achieve a 41–32 victory. Two weeks later, he recorded his first career interception against the Los Angeles Chargers.

On October 15, 2026, Abrams-Draine recorded his second career interception against the Seattle Seahawks, as well as defending three passes.

== NFL career statistics ==
Legend
**Bold**	Career high

=== Regular season ===
Year	Team	Games		Tackles					Interceptions						Fumbles				
Year	Team	GP	GS	Cmb	Solo	Ast	Sck	TFL	Int	Yds	Avg	Lng	TD	PD	FF	Fmb	FR	Yds	TD
2024	DEN	5	1	9	5	4	0.0	0	**1**	**17**	**17.0**	**17**	0	**2**	0	0	0	0	0
2025	DEN	17	2	**30**	**21**	**9**	0.0	**1**	0	0	0.0	0	0	1	0	0	0	0	0
Career		22	3	39	26	13	0.0	1	1	17	17.0	17	0	3	0	0	0	0	0

=== Postseason ===
Year	Team	Games		Tackles					Interceptions						Fumbles				
Year	Team	GP	GS	Cmb	Solo	Ast	Sck	TFL	Int	Yds	Avg	Lng	TD	PD	FF	Fmb	FR	Yds	TD
2024	DEN	1	0	**1**	**1**	0	0.0	0	0	0	0.0	0	0	0	0	0	0	0	0
2025	DEN	2	0	**1**	**1**	0	0.0	0	0	0	0.0	0	0	0	0	0	0	0	0
Career		3	0	2	2	0	0.0	0	0	0	0.0	0	0	0	0	0	0	0	0
