= Lombard Road power station =

Former power station in England

- Country: United Kingdom
- Location: Battersea London
- Coordinates: 51°28′16″N 00°10′37″W
- Status: Decommissioned and demolished
- Construction began: 1897
- Commission date: 1901
- Decommission date: 1972
- Owners: Borough of Battersea (1901–1948); British Electricity Authority (1948–1955); Central Electricity Authority (1955–1957); Central Electricity Generating Board (1958–1972)
- Operator: As owner

Thermal power station
- Primary fuel: Coal
- Turbine technology: Steam reciprocating engines and steam turbines
- Cooling towers: None
- Cooling source: River water

Power generation
- Units operational: 2 x 5 MW, 1 x 10 MW, 1 x 30 MW
- Make and model: Fraser & Chalmers-GEC and Westinghouse
- Nameplate capacity: 50 MW
- Annual net output: 62.9 GWh (1946)

Lombard Road power station supplied electricity to the Battersea area of South-East London from 1901 to 1972. It was owned and operated by the Borough of Battersea until the nationalisation of the electricity supply industry in 1948. The power station was redeveloped several times: including the incorporation of new plant in the 1910s and the 1930s. The station was decommissioned in 1972.

== History ==
In 1896 the vestry of Battersea applied for a provisional order under the Electric Lighting Acts to generate and supply electricity to the parish. The Battersea Electric Lighting Order 1896 was granted by the Board of Trade and was confirmed by Parliament through the Electric Lighting Orders Confirmation (No. 5) Act 1896 (59 & 60 Vict. c. cxix). The power station was built between Lombard Road and Harroway Road in Battersea (51°28′16″N 0°10′37″W).

== Equipment specification ==
The power station opened in 1901 with a max demand of 664kW. It compromised a number of generators

- 2x Willans & Robins steam engines driving Mather & Platt 192 kW generators.
- 1x Willans & Robins steam engine driving a Mather & Platt 324 kW generator.

In 1923 the generating plant comprised:

Coal-fired boilers generating up to 207,000 lb/h (26.1 kg/s) of steam, the boilers fed steam to:

- Generators:
  - 1 × 850 kW reciprocating engine driving a DC generator,
  - 1 × 1,500 kW steam turbine driving a DC generator,
  - 2 × 5,000 kW steam turbo-alternators (AC).

The total generating capacity was 12,350 kW.

A variety of electricity current was available to consumers:

- Direct current at 230 and 460 volts,
- 3-phase, 50 Hz AC at 400 volts,
- 3-phase, 50 Hz AC at 6,000 volts for industrial users.

In 1928 a new 10MW Fraser and Chalmers 3000rpm turbo alternator powered from 2x Babcock and Wilcox marine boilers with integral superheaters designed to evaporate 65,000 Ib. to 95,000 lb. of water per hour from feed water at a temperature of 175 deg. Fah. into steam at a pressure of 325 lb. per square inch. The turbo alternator drove a General Electric Company (Witton) three-phase, 6.6 kV, 50 Hz alternator. The normal rating is 12,500 kVA but capable of developing an overload of 25 per cent. for two hours.

=== New plant 1930s ===
A new generator and switch house were added to the power station in 1931.

By 1954 the plant at Lombard Road was in its final configuration and comprised:

- Boilers:
  - 4 × Babcock and Wilcox boilers with chain grate stokers, each 65,000 lb/h (8.2 kg/s), steam conditions 315 psi and 750 °F (21.7 bar, 400 °C),
  - 2 × Babcock and Wilcox boilers with chain grate stokers, each 125,000 lb/h (15.75 kg/s), steam conditions 315 psi and 750 °F (21.7 bar, 400 °C),

The boilers had a total evaporative capacity of 510,000 lb/h (64.3 kg/s).

Coal was delivered by road and by barge to Grove Wharf on the Thames. From the wharf it was delivered to the power station by an inclined conveyor across Lombard Road.

The boilers supplied steam to:

- Turbo-alternators:
  - 1 × Westinghouse 5 MW turbo-alternator, low pressure set, generating at 6.6 kV. Steam at 190 psi and 520 °F (13.1 bar and 271 °C) via a reducing valve.
  - 1 × Fraser & Chalmers-GEC 5 MW turbo-alternator, low pressure set, generating at 6.6 kV. Steam at 190 psi and 520 °F (13.1 bar and 271 °C) via a reducing valve.
  - 1 × Fraser & Chalmers-GEC 30 MW turbo-alternator, high pressure set, generating at 6.6 kV,
  - 1 × Fraser & Chalmers-GEC 10 MW turbo-alternator, high pressure set, generating at 6.6 kV,

The completed total installed generating capacity was 50 MW, with an output capacity of 42 MW.

Condenser cooling water was drawn from the River Thames.

== Operations ==
=== Operating data 1904–20 ===
The operating data for the period 1904–20 is shown in the table.

Year	Electricity sold GWh	Income from sales of current £
1904	1.357	
1908	3.076	
1913	6.214	46,077
1914	6.640	
1919	14.191	97,022
1920	9.817	

=== Operating data 1921–24 ===
A breakdown of the operating data for the period 1921–24 is shown in the table:

Lombard Road power station operating data 1921–24
Electricity Use	Units	Year			
Electricity Use	Units	1921	1922	1923	1924
Lighting and domestic use	MWh	2,605	2,741	3,150	15,252 (including power)
Public lighting use	MWh	592	636	753	755
Power use	MWh	8,376	6,877	8,541	
Bulk supply	MWh	1,646	2,069	2,187	1,503
Total use	MWh	13,219	12,324	14,632	17,511
Load and connected load
Maximum load	kW	6,000	6,007	7,950	7,800
Total connections	kW	15,875	17,297	18,143	20,079
Load factor	Per cent	30.1	28.1	25.4	25.6
Financial
Revenue from sales of current	£	–	130,178	123,777	122,223
Surplus of revenue over expenses	£	–	47,530	61,589	

The growth of demand and use of electricity is evident.

Under the terms of the Electricity (Supply) Act 1926 (16 & 17 Geo. 5. c. 51) the Central Electricity Board (CEB) was established in 1926. The CEB identified high efficiency 'selected' power stations that would supply electricity most effectively; Lombard Road was designated a selected station. The CEB also constructed the National Grid (1927–33) to connect power stations within a region.

=== Operating data 1934–46 ===
Lombard Road power station operating data for 1934–46 is given below.

Lombard Road power station operating data, 1934–46
Year	Load factor per cent	Max output load MW	Electricity supplied GWh	Thermal efficiency per cent
1934			55.695	
1935			40.207	
1936			47.143	
1937	39.7	16,720	52.342	
1946	21.3	33,700	62.906	16.10

The larger amount of electricity supplied reflects the capacity of the new generating plant installed in the early 1930s.

The British electricity supply industry was nationalised in 1948 under the provisions of the Electricity Act 1947 (10 & 11 Geo. 6. c. 54). The Borough of Battersea electricity undertaking was abolished, ownership of Lombard Road power station was vested in the British Electricity Authority, and subsequently the Central Electricity Authority and the Central Electricity Generating Board (CEGB). At the same time the electricity distribution and sales responsibilities of the Battersea electricity undertaking were transferred to the London Electricity Board (LEB).

=== Operating data 1954–71 ===
Operating data for the period 1954–71 is shown in the table:

Lombard Road power station operating data, 1954–71
Year	Running hours or load factor (per cent)	Max output capacity MW	Electricity supplied GWh	Thermal efficiency per cent
1954	1190	42	14.914	13.17
1955	3488	42	42.502	14.93
1956	848	42	11.22	12.20
1957	1261	42	17.258	12.91
1958	1006	42	14.236	13.45
1961	6.9%	42	25.24	15.26
1962	7.0%	42	25.841	14.84
1963	10.42%	42	10.42	15.10
1966	9.8%	42	36.091	13.62
1967	9.8%	42	36.016	14.16
1968	12.1%	42	44.555	14.31
1969	5.1%	42	18.613	10.37
1970	4.5%	38	16.714	13.67
1971	6.3%	28	21.015	11.92

The declining use of the station at lower thermal efficiencies is evident.

Electricity (in GWh) supplied by Lombard Road power station

== Closure ==
Lombard Road power station was decommissioned in 1972. The buildings were subsequently demolished and the area has been redeveloped with housing and commercial units.

== See also ==
- Timeline of the UK electricity supply industry
- List of power stations in England
