= Woolwich Power Station =

Former coal-fired power station

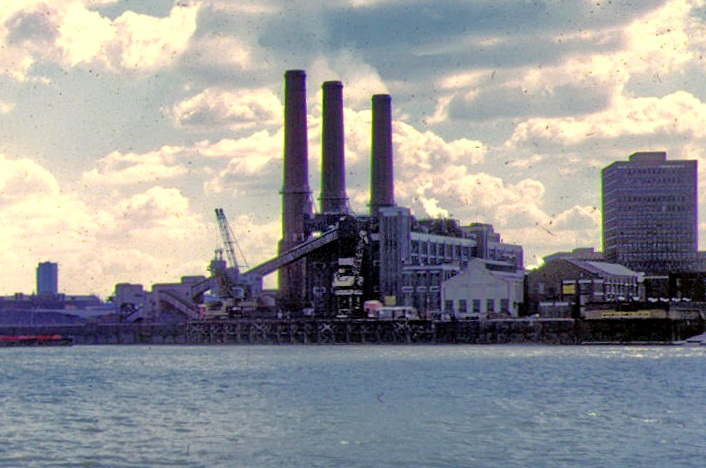
- Woolwich Power Station from the ferry in 1973
- Country: England
- Location: Greenwich, London
- Coordinates: 51.494400°N 0.065700°E
- Status: Decommissioned and demolished
- Construction began: 1891
- Commission date: 1893
- Decommission date: 1978
- Owner: As operator
- Operators: Woolwich District Electric Lighting Company (1893–1903); Woolwich Borough Council (1903–1948); British Electricity Authority (1948–1955); Central Electricity Authority (1955–1957); Central Electricity Generating Board (1958–1978)

Thermal power station
- Primary fuel: Coal
- Site area: 7.5 acres
- Chimneys: 3
- Cooling towers: None
- Cooling source: River water

Power generation
- Units operational: 1 × 12.5 MW, 3 × 34.5 MW, 2 × 30 MW (in 1957)
- Make and model: Fraser & Chalmers/GEC
- Units decommissioned: All
- Nameplate capacity: See table in text
- Annual net output: See graph in text

External links
- Commons: Related media on Commons

Woolwich Power Station was a coal-fired power station on the south bank of the Thames at Woolwich.

== History ==
The first station was opened at the site in 1893 by the Woolwich District Electric Lighting Company adapted from boat repair shops, and subsequently taken over by the Metropolitan Borough of Woolwich. During later construction work in 1912 the timbers of a Tudor warship believed to be Henry VII's 1488 ship Sovereign were uncovered on the site.

The station was redeveloped in the 1920s and again in the 1940s and 1950s, ultimately having three fluted brick chimneys on the east side of the station. It occupied a site of just over seven and a half acres.

In 1906 alternating current and direct current was being supplied generated by a 2.5 MW machine supplied by C.A. Parsons Ltd. Between 1912 and 1917 additional plant was installed ranging from 1.5 MW to 6 MW capacity. The generating capacity, maximum load, and electricity generated and sold was as follows:

Woolwich power station generating capacity, load and electricity produced and sold, 1903–36
Year	Generating capacity, MW	Maximum load, MW	Electricity generated, GWh	Electricity sold, GWh
1903/4	1.458	0.733	0.763	0.695
1912/3	1.750	1.610	3.504	2.939
1918/9	12.51	8.615	28.142	25.416
1919/20	12.51	6.979	14.574	12.537
1923/4	20.25	10.550	29.107	23.600
1936/7	40.00	40.74	90.261 (134.0 purchased)	125.024

The coal used by the station was usually shipped from the Yorkshire and Northumberland areas and offloaded by crane onto a deep trough conveyor. At its peak the station was burning over 1000 tons of coal a day.

=== Redevelopment ===
The earliest buildings on the site were replaced in 1924–28. The 1924–28 station known as the low-pressure section had four Babcock & Wilcox boilers (decommissioned 1963) and 1 × 12.5 MW Fraser & Chalmers/GEC turbo-alternator which generated at 6.6 kV. The 1940–48 intermediate-pressure section had six Babcock & Wilcox boilers and 3 × 34.5 MW Fraser & Chalmers/GEC turbo-alternators generating at 22 kV. The final 1952–57 high-pressure section had four John Thompson ‘La Mont’ boilers and 2 × 30 MW Fraser & Chalmers/GEC turbo-alternators generating at 22 kV.

The steam conditions at the turbine stop-valves of the various steam systems were:

Operating conditions of steam systems
	Pressure	Temperature
Low pressure	190 psi (13 bar)	316 °C
Intermediate pressure	400 psi (27.6 bar)	427 °C
High pressure	600 psi (41.4 bar)	454 °C

The total steam generating capacity from 1966 to 1974 was 1,710,000 lb/hr (215.4 kg/s); then 92.0 kg/s during 1975–78.

One of the high-pressure 30 MW machines was decommissioned in 1971. The three intermediate pressure 34.5 MW machines were decommissioned in 1973, together with the intermediate-pressure boilers. The final 30 MW generator was decommissioned in 1978.

The gross generating capability was:

Electricity Generating Capability
Year(s)	1954/5	1955-6	1966-70	1971-72	1973-4	1975-78
Generating capability MW	140	167	178.75	176.75	164.25	60.0

=== Electricity output ===
Electricity output from Woolwich power station was as follows.

Woolwich power station annual electricity output GWh

=== Closure ===
The station closed on 30 October 1978 with a generating capacity of 57 megawatts. One chimney was demolished by hand in 1978, and the remaining two by explosives in 1979. The site of the main power station building then became the Waterfront Leisure Centre car park; part of the coaling jetty remains. Around 2020 the car park was sold to Berkeley homes and it became part of the Royal Arsenal development. Ultimately the whole leisure centre will be relocated to General Gordon square.

== See also ==
- Old Woolwich
- Woolwich Ferry
- Greenwich Power Station
