= GeoGuessr =

2013 geographic discovery video game

- Publisher: GeoGuessr AB
- Designer: Anton Wallén
- Platforms: Web browser Android iOS; Windows
- Release: 9 May 2013; 13 years ago
- Modes: Single-player, multiplayer

GeoGuessr is a geography video game created by Swedish developer Anton Wallén and released in 2013. Players attempt to identify locations from Google Street View imagery using visual clues. The game includes single-player and multiplayer modes, as well as competitive duels and tournaments.

Players can use clues such as writing systems, architecture, driving direction, vehicle registration plates, landscapes and vegetation to determine their location. GeoGuessr has been used as an educational tool for geography and has developed a competitive scene, including the annual GeoGuessr World Championship, first held in 2023.

== History ==
The game was designed by Swedish IT consultant Anton Wallén in 2013. Wallén loved to visit faraway locations on Google Street View, and initially designed a program to generate a random location in Street View before deciding to add a competitive element.

The game's development took approximately two weeks' work, using Backbone.js and the Google Maps API.

In April 2013, according to The New Yorker, Wallén posted on Reddit and said that he "was fiddling around with Backbone and Google Maps API v3 and decided to make a small application" and asked for feedback. Wallén posted the completed game to Google Chrome Experiments on 10 May 2013. Initially released as a browser game, mobile apps for GeoGuessr were later developed for Android and iOS.

GeoGuessr AB is located in Stockholm. In September 2026, the company published You Are Here: The Official Guidebook, a guide to identifying geographic clues in the game.

== Gameplay ==
The GeoGuessr "classic" view

=== Modes ===
The "classic" GeoGuessr game mode consists of five rounds, each displaying a different street view location for the player to guess on a map. The player then receives a score of up to 5,000 points depending on how accurate their guess was, up to 25,000 points for a perfect game. Games may be user-generated or randomly generated from a pool of locations.

Other game modes have included:

- Battle Royale, a multiplayer last-one-standing game.
- Duels, a two-player head-to-head competition.
- Streaks, where players identify countries or U.S. states until they guess incorrectly.
- Explorer Mode, a single-player game where medals are awarded for accuracy in individual countries.
- Team Duels, a variation of Duels played between two teams of two players.
- Campaign, a former mode in which players travelled the world and its various cities while collecting tips to help them determine where they were. The mode was discontinued in August 2026.
- Tournaments, an elimination-bracket mode introduced in October 2026.

In 2022, GeoGuessr acquired the geography quiz site Seterra, and implemented a quiz mode combining standard street view gameplay with trivia questions.

=== Difficulties ===
GeoGuessr has three movement settings:

1. Moving: Players can move, pan, and zoom within the Google Street View imagery.
2. No Move: Players can pan and zoom but cannot move.
3. No Move, Pan, or Zoom (NMPZ): Players are given a static image.

=== Interface ===
The game's HUD primarily features the Google Street View imagery, as well as a compass. Users can control the movement, panning, and zooming of the image, although GeoGuessr allows any of these features to be disabled for harder gameplay. An inset map, using Google Maps's standard overlay, allows players to place a pin to make their guess.

=== Strategy ===
Users may interpret their location from the photographs by reading road signage, memorizing utility poles, analyzing architecture, finding the relative position of the Sun, identifying flora and soil types, studying what various landscapes of the world look like, observing license plates and learning diacritics specific to particular writing systems among many other more advanced categories of clues. Players can also make use of Street View metadata to ascertain their location – for example, the Street View vehicle that captured imagery in Ghana contained a roof rack with distinct black tape on one end. As the competitive scene expanded and the game's strategies became increasingly sophisticated, community-created educational resources emerged to document recurring geographic clues and Street View characteristics.

== Subscription ==
GeoGuessr offers free play with limited functionality, while paid Pro subscriptions provide access to additional game modes and features. Pro Unlimited includes unlimited play, and Pro Elite adds cosmetic features, including avatar customisation and emotes. The separate GeoGuessr Steam Edition provides some free multiplayer modes and a daily challenge, with additional modes available through a subscription or Steam Pass.

== Reception ==
The launch of the game in May 2013 was described as successful, with the game instantly going viral. Upon its release, the game was described as "insanely addictive". The start of the COVID-19 pandemic triggered a renewed interest in the game. It also had a second peak in March 2021. By July 2022, the game had 40 million player accounts. Interest in the game has been propagated on platforms such as Reddit, YouTube, TikTok, and Twitch, where notable users such as Ludwig, the Sidemen, GeoWizard, LazarBeam and Rainbolt have recorded or streamed themselves playing the game.

The 2025 Steam release of the game received an "overwhelmingly negative" (Note: Review scores on Steam are considered "overwhelmingly negative" when the percentage of positive reviews is 20% or less. As of 9 May 2025, 15% of GeoGuessr's reviews were positive.) aggregated review score. The main complaint of players was paid subscription required to play the game after several hours of free gameplay and lack of features presented compared to the web version. The Steam subscription was originally unconnected to the browser version's subscription, and despite an attempt of the developers of giving free access to those with the Unlimited Yearly subscription from the web version, the reviews still stayed mostly negative. The game received generally negative user reviews, with reports at the time describing it as the second-worst-rated game on the platform. By early 2026, recent reviews on Steam were "mostly positive".

The game has been cited as an educational tool by helping users to "develop critical skills to analyze geographical and cultural landscapes", and it has been suggested that the game could enhance geographical education within the classroom.

GeoGuessr players have criticized some of the photographic coverage used in the game. Imagery provided by parties outside of Google have been described by players as grainy, blurry, and over- or under-exposed. World Travel in 360, the organization that led the program to supply coverage of Zanzibar, stated that "[their] mapping is better than nothing". Similar complaints have also been made against coverage photographed by Google using lower-quality cameras, colloquially known as "shitcam".

The game has been the inspiration for several fan-made versions, which use video-game environments, such as the worlds of Grand Theft Auto V, Fortnite, World of Warcraft, Genshin Impact, and The Legend of Zelda: Breath of the Wild.

=== AI research ===
In July 2023, researchers at Stanford University developed a machine learning tool that was able to locate 40% of GeoGuessr locations with an accuracy of 25 km (16 mi) or better. After three attempts, the model was able to beat Trevor Rainbolt, a top-ranked player. In a preprint, the authors noted that such models could positively impact climate research, as successful geolocation of an image often requires a correct climate classification of the locale: if artificial intelligence can detect that several images come from the same region, feeding the tool with pictures could provide inexpensive data on how climate change affects that region. The study stated that quick recognition of outdoor locations could also have privacy and security implications.

== Events ==
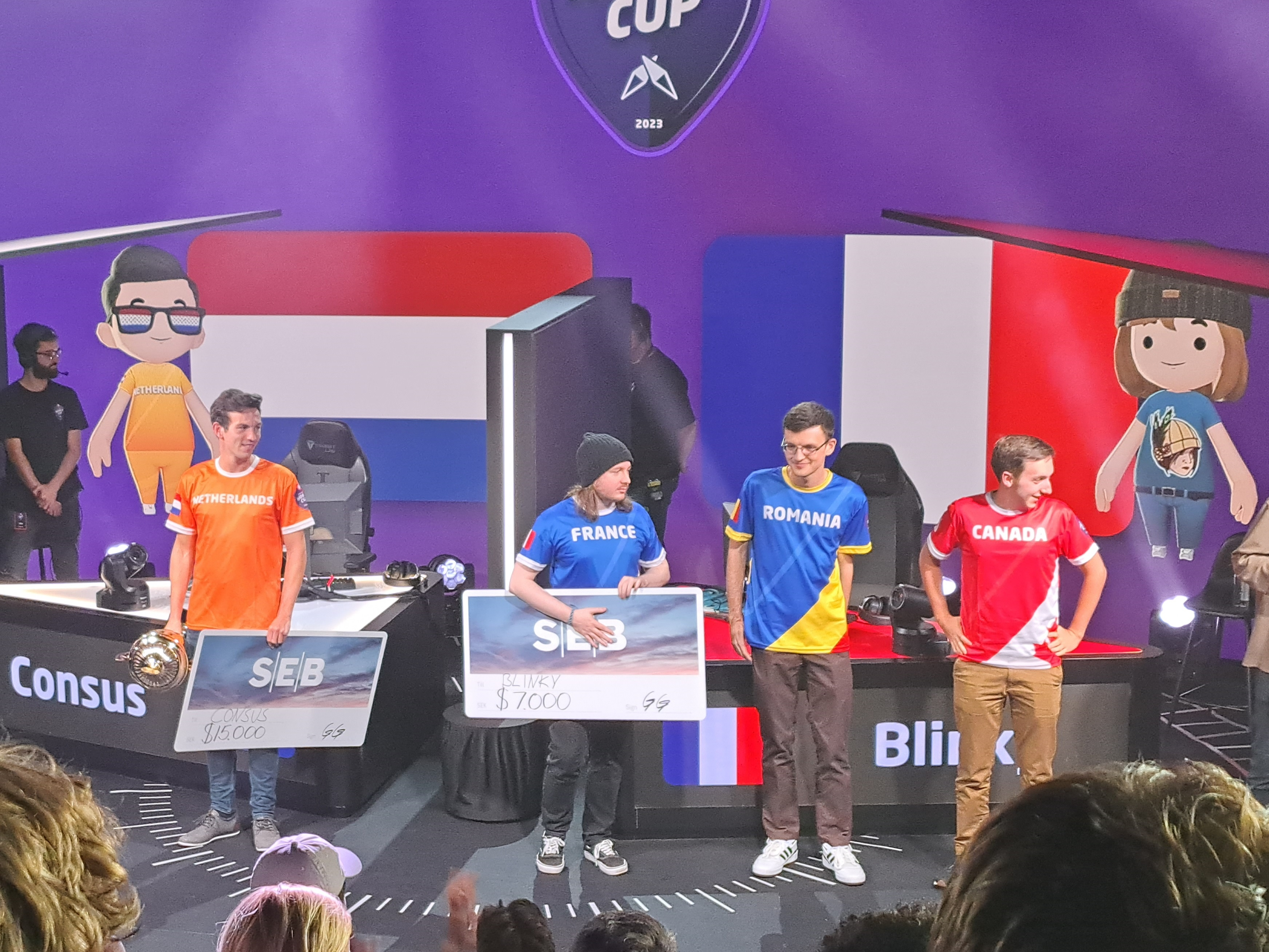
GeoGuessr World Cup 2023 top 4 players: Consus, Blinky, Radu, (Note: Player Radu C "RC" has played in WC tournaments under both the Romanian and US flag.) and Fau

On 22 October 2022, the independently organised "GeoGuessr Team World Cup" was held in Paris as a live tournament streamed on Twitch. It was commentated by streamers including Antoine Daniel and Etoiles. The competition was won by the team "Speed Plonkers", which featured the players Blinky (France), Kodiak (Germany), and Maccem (Sweden). They defeated the team "A Community Team" featuring Radu C (USA), Toro (USA) and Mate Potato (India).

Four GeoGuessr World Championships tournaments have been held. In the inaugural iteration in October 2023, Dutch player Consus defeated French player Blinky in the final. The second World Cup was held in September 2024, with Blinky winning 3–2 over US player MK. In 2025, the event was renamed to the GeoGuessr World Championship, as it was announced that the third event would be the first to take place outside Sweden. In August 2025, US player Radu C defeated Hungarian player Debre 3–2 at K.B. Hallen in Copenhagen. The fourth edition was held at the Tempodrom in Berlin from 2 to 5 September 2026 and concluded with the 2025 runner-up Debre defeating French player Blinky 3–2 in the final.

On 15 May 2025, GeoGuessr announced its participation in the 2025 Esports World Cup in Riyadh, Saudi Arabia. The decision faced backlash from the game's community, with players citing concerns over Saudi Arabia's human rights record. On 21 May, creators of major world maps made their content unplayable in protest. Following sustained community opposition, GeoGuessr withdrew from the event the next day, with CEO Daniel Antell stating the company had "got it wrong". The withdrawal made GeoGuessr the first game to leave the Esports World Cup due to community pressure.

== See also ==
- Google Street View
- Coverage of Google Street View
- Impact of the COVID-19 pandemic on the video game industry
