= Mongraal =

British Fortnite gamer (born 2004)

Personal information
- Name: Kyle Jackson
- Born: 13 August 2004 (age 22); United Kingdom

Current team
- Team: Red Bull Gaming
- Game: Fortnite

Career information
- Playing career: 2018–present

Team history
- 2018–2019: Team Secret
- 2019–2023: FaZe Clan
- 2025–present: Red Bull Gaming

Career highlights and awards
- FNCS champion (2020 – C2S4); FNCS 2nd place (2019 – C2S1); FNCS 8th place (2025 – C6S1); FNCS 10th place (2019 – C1SX); Fortnite World Cup duos 6th place; Fortnite World Cup solos 13th place

Twitch information
- Channel: Mongraal
- Followers: 7 million

YouTube information
- Channel: Mongraal
- Subscribers: 5.71 million
- Views: 840 million
- Last updated: September 6, 2025

Kyle Jackson (born 13 August 2004), better known as Mongraal is a British streamer and professional gamer. Playing Fortnite Battle Royale competitively since 2018, he has earned over $700,000. Streaming on Twitch, he has gained over 7 million followers.

== Early life ==
Jackson is from Sidcup, London, where he started gaming at the age of eight.

== Professional Fortnite career ==
Jackson started playing video games at the age of eight, and realised three years later that he was "better than the average player", topping scoreboards and often besting semi-professional players.

=== 2018–2019: Team Secret and Friday Fortnite success ===
On April 25, 2018, at the age of 13, Jackson signed for esports organisation Team Secret, attaining greater notability through an interview with the BBC four days later.

With Epic Games not hosting any official tournaments at the time, Jackson won one of the weekly Friday Fortnite tournaments with Secret teammate Domeniks "Domentos" Bunts, earning them $10,000 each.

Jackson competed in Epic Games' Winter Royale qualifying tournament in November 2018; he would have qualified, had it not been for the competitive age limit being 16 at the time. Fortnite lowered the age limit to 13 ahead of the Fortnite World Cup, allowing Jackson, then aged 14, to compete. In tournaments ahead of the World Cup qualifiers, Jackson played successfully with eventual World Cup duo Dmitri "Mitr0" van de Vrie.

=== 2019: Fortnite World Cup and FaZe Clan ===
The Fortnite World Cup consisted of one solo and one duo tournament, to which players had to qualify through high placements in weekly qualifiers. Jackson, playing together with van de Vrie, qualified for the duos tournament in week two, although it took Jackson until the final week to qualify for the solos tournament. This made him one of only 18 players to qualify for both solos and duos.

On July 7, 2019, Jackson signed for FaZe Clan, leaving Team Secret.

At the World Cup, Jackson was among the most consistent players, placing 13th in solos and 6th in duos with van de Vrie. In total, Jackson earned $375,000 from both tournaments.

=== 2019–2020: Early FNCS tournaments and win ===
Following the Fortnite World Cup, Fortnite's biggest tournaments were the Fortnite Championship Series, usually abbreviated as FNCS. For the first season, Season X, the gamemode was trios, and Jackson entered a dominant run together with teammates Benjy "Benjyfishy" Fish and Dmitri "Mitr0" van de Vrie, collectively known as MMB. In the six qualifiers, MMB finished 1st three times and 2nd three times, earning them $134,400 each from the qualifiers alone. In the Grand Finals, however, MMB were targeted at their landing spot, finishing in 10th place, earning $3,200 each.

Jackson finished 2nd in the next season, Chapter 2, Season 1's FNCS, earning him and his three teammates $30,000 each.

In Chapter 2, Season 4, after failing to contend for the FNCS three times in a row, Jackson won FNCS with van de Vrie and Tai 'TaySon' Starčič, earning $37,000 each.

=== 2021–2023: Failure to qualify for FNCS and brief retirement ===
Following his FNCS win, Jackson started playing Fortnite less. Although he would return to playing with Dmitri "Mitr0" van de Vrie and Benjy "Benjyfishy" Fish, the trio failed to perform well. After again splitting with MMB, Jackson failed to qualify for FNCS in Chapter 2, Seasons 5 through 8. Jackson effectively retired from Fortnite competitive in 2021. Nevertheless, Jackson again played competitively with van de Vrie ahead of Chapter 3 Season 1's duo FNCS, but the duo failed to qualify for its Grand Finals.

Feeling burnt out from Fortnite, Jackson spent his retirement travelling. He also began working out in the gym.

On 27 February, 2023, after achieving the highest score in Yuga Labs' Dookey Dash competition, Jackson sold his winning NFT for 1,000 ETH, at the time roughly $1.63 million.

=== 2023–2025: Return with MrSavage ===
With the return of the Chapter 1 map on November 3, 2023, Jackson started playing Fortnite again. Ahead of Chapter 5, Season 1's FNCS – known as FNCS Major 1 – Jackson started playing competitively with fellow World Cup player Martin "MrSavage" Foss Andersen. The duo went on to qualify for the Grand Finals. This was the first grands that Jackson qualified to since winning FNCS over three years prior.

After failing to qualify for FNCS Major 2 with Foss Andersen, the duo moved to Dallas to play the FNCS Major 3 on the North American region. The tournament featured ten qualification spots to the 2024 FNCS Global Championship, with up to a top 14 finish possibly enough to qualify depending on the placement of already-qualified teams. Initially contested off-spawn by Death and Ben "Edgey" Petersen, Jackson and Foss Andersen outperformed them during qualifying rounds, subsequently enjoying an uncontested drop spot in the Grand Finals, for which they qualified. One day before grands, Epic Games updated the "slurp cacti", upon which Jackson and Foss Andersen had been relying, to no longer respawn after being used to regain HP once. The duo went on to place 28th, failing to qualify for Globals.

Following the 2024 Global Championship, the competitive game mode switched back to trios. After playing with a few different trio mates, Jackson and Foss Andersen placed 8th in Chapter 6, Season 1's FNCS together with Panzer, winning one of the 12 games and earning $11,600 each.

=== 2025–present: Split with MrSavage and sporadic teammates ===
After the 8th place in FNCS, Jackson stopped playing with Andersen.

On April 4, 2025, Jackson signed for Red Bull Gaming, in a deal lasting through 2025.

On May 10, 2025, Jackson played in the FNCS Pro-Am with content creator Alastair 'Ali-A' Aiken. The duo finished last out of 20 teams.

In January, 2026, Jackson once again announced his partnership with Martin 'MrSavage' Foss Andersen in a 40-second video, ahead of the 2026 FNCS played in duos. Their partnership, however, was short-lived, as Jackson announced their split on February 12, 2026, claiming it would be better for both of them.

== Style of play ==
In 2018, Jackson pioneered the use of building and editing to win fights in Fortnite. He would develop a sequence of moves known as the "Mongraal classic", attacking opponents protected by their own box. In his prime, he was regarded as being one of the best at reflexes and aiming. Prior to his first retirement, Jackson was known for his temperament.

== FNCS results ==
Career FNCS results
Tournament					Result					
Official name	Start date	End date	Season	Team size	Team mate(s)	Region	Made Grand Finals	Placement	Earnings	Source(s)
FNCS: Season X	August 16, 2019	September 22, 2019	C1SX	Trios	(Netherlands) Mitr0 & (United Kingdom) Benjyfishy	EU	Yes	10th	$137,600	
FNCS: Chapter 2 – Season 1	November 2, 2019	December 8, 2019	C2S1	Squads	(United Kingdom) Wolfiez, (United Kingdom) Benjyfishy & (France) Nayte	EU	Yes	2nd	$37,000	
FNCS: Chapter 2 Season 2	March 20, 2020	April 19, 2020	C2S2	Duos	(United Kingdom) Benjyfishy	EU	Eliminated in heats	—	$3,350	
FNCS – Invitational	May 1, 2020	May 24, 2020	C2S2	Solos	N/A	EU	Yes	26th	$2,150	
FNCS: Chapter 2 Season 3	July 31, 2020	August 16, 2020	C2S3	Solos	N/A	EU	Yes	16th	$4,350	
FNCS: Chapter 2 Season 4	October 8, 2020	November 1, 2020	C2S4	Trios	(Netherlands) Mitr0 & (Slovenia) TaySon	EU	Yes	1st	$45,875	
FNCS: Chapter 2 Season 5	February 11, 2021	March 14, 2021	C2S5	Trios	Multiple trios	EU	Eliminated in opens	—		
FNCS: Chapter 2 Season 6	April 22, 2021	May 30, 2021	C2S6	Trios	(Netherlands) Mitr0 & (Netherlands) Milan	EU	Eliminated in opens	—		
FNCS All-Star Showdown	June 17, 2021	June 26, 2021	C2S7	Solos	N/A	EU	Eliminated in play-ins	—		
FNCS: Chapter 2 Season 7	July 29, 2021	September 5, 2021	C2S7	Trios	(Portugal) Kikoo & (Portugal) Slender	EU	Eliminated in semi-finals	—		
FNCS: Chapter 2 Season 8	October 14, 2021	October 31, 2021	C2S8	Trios	(United Kingdom) Veno & (United Kingdom) JoeFN	EU	Eliminated in semi-finals	—		
2021 FNCS Grand Royale	November 12, 2021	November 20, 2021	C2S8	Trios	Multiple trios	EU	Eliminated in victory path	—		
FNCS: Chapter 3 Season 1	February 17, 2022	March 6, 2022	C3S1	Duos	(Netherlands) Mitr0	EU	Eliminated in opens	—		
Didn't participate in 7 FNCS tournaments
FNCS Major 1 – 2024	January 26, 2024	February 25, 2024	C5S1	Duos	(Norway) MrSavage	EU	Yes	39th	$1,500	
FNCS Major 2 – 2024	April 12, 2024	May 12, 2024	C5S2	Duos	(Norway) MrSavage	EU	Eliminated in semi-finals	—		
FNCS Major 3 – 2024	June 14, 2024	July 28, 2024	C5S3	Duos	(Norway) MrSavage	NAC	Yes	28th	$1,500	
2024 FNCS Global Championship	September 7, 2024	September 8, 2024	C5S4	Duos	Failed to qualify through either Major					
FNCS Major 1 – 2025	January 29, 2025	February 16, 2025	C6S1	Trios	(Norway) MrSavage & (Russia) panzer	EU	Yes	8th	$11,600	
FNCS Major 2 – 2025	April 9, 2025	April 27, 2025	C6S2	Trios	Multiple trios	EU	Eliminated in opens	—		
FNCS Major 3 – 2025	July 16, 2025	August 3, 2025	C6S3	Trios	(Germany) Kyto & (Germany) Hijoe	EU	Eliminated in group stage	—		
2025 FNCS Global Championship	September 6, 2025	September 7, 2025	C6S4	Trios	Failed to qualify through either Major					

Career FNCS statistics
Chapter	Out of	Played	Placements						LAN appearances	Most frequent team mate(s)	Earnings
Chapter	Out of	Played	Wins	Top 2	Top 3	Top 5	Top 10	Grand Finals	LAN appearances	Most frequent team mate(s)	Earnings
1	1	1	0	0	0	0	1	1	—	(Netherlands) Mitr0 & (United Kingdom) Benjyfishy (1 each)	$137,600
2	11	11	1	2	2	2	2	4	—	(Netherlands) Mitr0 & (United Kingdom) Benjyfishy (2 each)	$55,725
3	4	1	0	0	0	0	0	0	0/1	(Netherlands) Mitr0 (1)	$0
4	4	0	—								
5	4	3	0	0	0	0	0	2	0/1	(Norway) MrSavage (3)	$3,000
6	4	3	0	0	0	0	1	1	0/1	4 different team mates (1 each)	$11,600
Total	28	19	1	2	2	2	4	8	0/4	(Netherlands) Mitr0 & (Norway) MrSavage (4 each)	$207,925

== Streaming and content creation ==
Having streamed his Fortnite gameplay since 2018, Jackson has gained 7.2 million followers on Twitch, and over 10 million hours watched. He is thus widely regarded as one of the most influential Fortnite content creators. Jackson has also gained over 5.7 million subscribers on YouTube. Besides his in-game skill, Jackson gained fame for his highly energetic and humorous personality.

"Why is that in the game? Shing, shing, shing!"

— Kyle Jackson after being eliminated by the Infinity Blade in 2018

After having been eliminated in a tournament game to the controversial Infinity Blade in December 2018, Jackson made an angry impression of the item in a popular clip.

On June 26, 2026, Mongraal was announced as a playable character (Icon Skin) in Fortnite. Released to the Item Shop on June 27, several other cosmetics accompany the character, such as the "Shing Shing Shing" emote, in reference to his 2018 Infinity Blade impression. Being a part of his brand for much of his career, four-leaf clovers feature heavily across many of the items. The character itself features a necklace with the initials MMB, referencing his dominant partnership with Dmitri "Mitr0" van de Vrie and Benjy "Benjyfishy" Fish in 2019. Van de Vrie is also referenced as Jackson's long-time duo partner, much like Martin "MrSavage" Foss Andersen, the former with a Dynamo mask, and the latter with a Shadow Bomb (a former in-game consumable), which Foss Andersen used to qualify for the solo Fortnite World Cup. The character also has a style wearing an alien onesie, which Jackson often did early in his career. The set was also available for free as the prize of the Mongraal Icon Cup, a duo Reload tournament.
