= Clix (gamer) =

American streamer and gamer (born 2005)

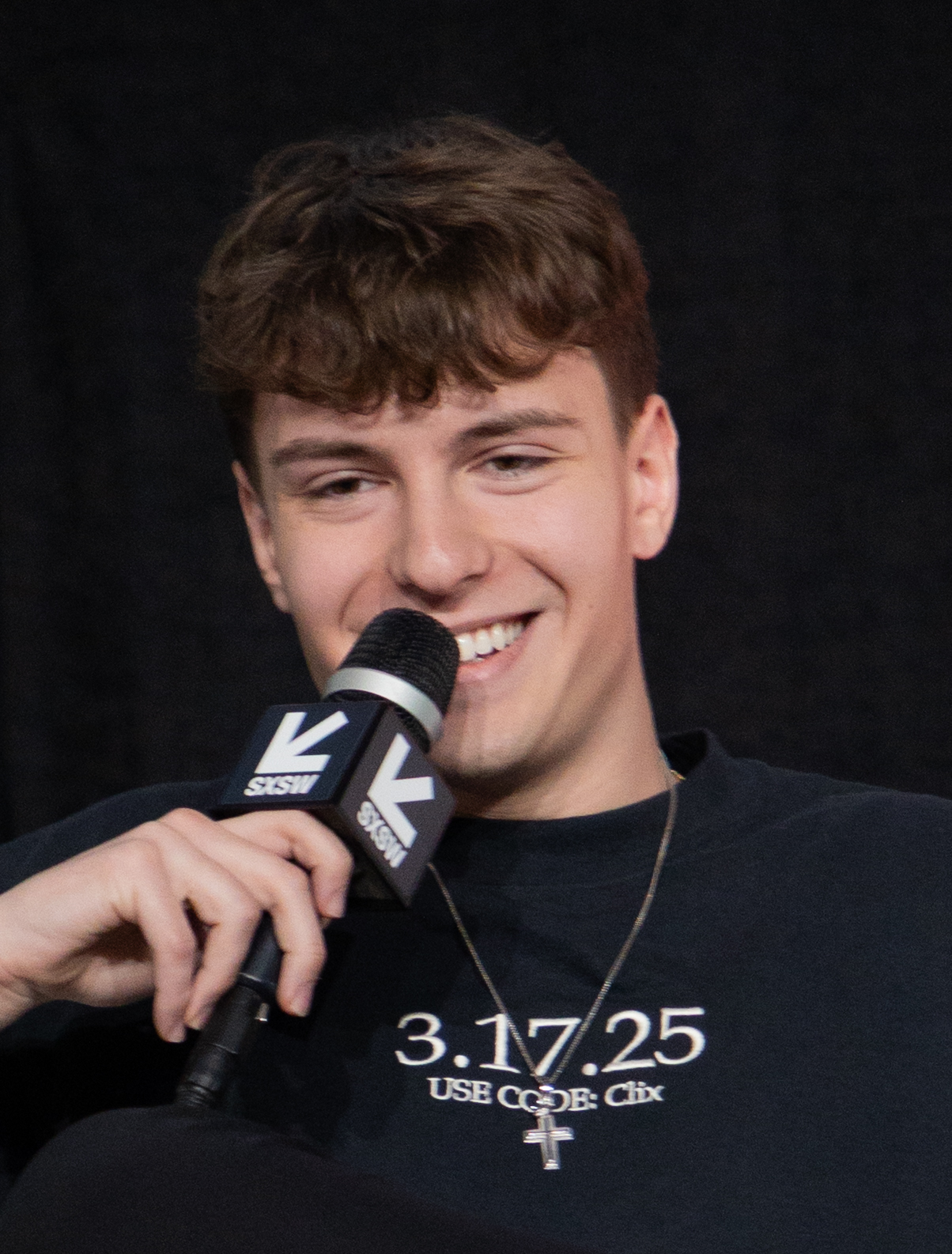
- Clix at SXSW in 2025

Personal information
- Name: Cody Conrod
- Born: January 7, 2005 (age 21); Connecticut, U.S.

Current team
- Team: XSET
- Game: Fortnite

Career information
- Playing career: 2019–present

Team history
- 2019–2020: Misfits
- 2020–2022: NRG
- 2022–2023: NRG
- 2023–present: XSET

Career highlights and awards
- FNCS 3rd place (2025 – C6S1); FNCS 2nd place (2025 – C6S2); FNCS 1st place (2026 – C7S3)

Twitch information
- Channel: Clix
- Followers: 8.5 million

YouTube information
- Channel: Clix
- Subscribers: 3.82 million
- Views: 785 million
- Last updated: April 9, 2026
- Website: clixmerch.com

Cody Conrod (born January 7, 2005), better known online as Clix, is an American live streamer and professional gamer. Playing Fortnite Battle Royale professionally since 2019, he has earned over $600,000 in prize money, making him one of the highest-earning Fortnite players. Streaming on Twitch, he has gained 8.6 million followers, as of 2026

== Fortnite career ==
At age 14, Conrod persuaded his father to purchase him a $1,000 gaming computer, signing a contract that he would repay his father.

=== 2019–2020: Misfits and Fortnite World Cup ===
Representing Misfits Gaming, Conrod was among the 18 players to qualify for both the solo and duo Fortnite World Cup tournaments, playing the duo tournament with Griffin "Sceptic" Spikoski. Finishing 35th in duos, and 18th in solos, Conrod earned $175,000 in total from the Fortnite World Cup. Following the tournament, Conrod and Spikoski publicly argued and separated.

=== 2020–2023: NRG ===
On July 1, 2020, Conrod's signature with esports organization NRG was announced in a video featuring fellow NRG Fortnite player Benjy "Benjyfishy" Fish and Shaquille O'Neal, marking Conrod's departure from Misfits.

Playing alongside Kyle "Bugha" Giersdorf and Timothy "Bizzle" Miller, Conrod achieved 5th place in the Chapter 2 Season 5 FNCS, his highest FNCS placement at the time, in March 2021, earning $18,000. The trio, however, failed to qualify for the next FNCS in Chapter 2 Season 6, after placing 32nd out of 33 teams in their semi final heat.

Conrod had often wagered money in 1v1s against fellow professional players and subscribers, a practice which had been common among Fortnite streamers during breaks between official tournaments. On March 25, 2021, Conrod stated on Twitter that he would stop playing these wagers, as Epic Games had told him to, with failure to comply resulting in a ban.

When his contract expired on February 22, 2022, Conrod left NRG, before re-signing two days later.

In Chapter 3 Season 3, Conrod placed fourth in FNCS alongside Lucas "Dukez" Cardenas, earning $28,000 each. Conrod and Cardenas were invited to play in the 2022 FNCS Invitational LAN tournament, in which they placed 15th, earning another $4,000 each.

=== 2023: Free agency and controversial ban ===
Amidst NRG stepping away from Fortnite, Conrod left NRG on January 25, 2023, becoming a free agent.

Ahead of Chapter 4 Season 2, Epic Games introduced the North America Central server, located in Dallas, which would replace the North America East and West servers in competitive events. As a result, Conrod, who had previously played from Connecticut on the North America East region, moved to Dallas for lower ping.

In a solo tournament on April 22, 2023, Conrod encountered a stream sniper who gave him items. Because Conrod accepted these items, he was banned from competitive for 14 days and disqualified from competing in the Chapter 4 Seasons 2 and 3 FNCS tournaments, which made it impossible for him to qualify for the 2023 Global Championship, although he was later allowed to play the Chapter 4 Season 3 FNCS. Conrod argued that he was trying to prove that the player was, in fact, stream sniping, hoping to get them banned. "#FreeClix" trended as a result of the ban, and the ban was widely criticized by fellow Fortnite players.

Conrod ended up qualifying for the 2023 Global Championship with Shane "EpikWhale" Cotton through the FNCS Last Chance Major.

=== 2023–present: XSET part-ownership and high FNCS placements ===
On October 10, 2023, ahead of the 2023 Global Championship, Conrod was announced as a new player and part-owner of XSET. At the Global Championship, Conrod and Cotton placed 52nd out of 73 teams, earning $2,000 each.

Conrod and Cotton kept playing together in 2024, earning Conrod another 4th place in the Chapter 5 Season 1 FNCS, and $30,000 in prize money.

After placing poorly in the Chapter 5 Season 2 FNCS, Conrod split with Cotton, instead teaming up with European player Harry "Veno" Pearson, who moved to North America as a result, with the goal to qualify for the 2024 Global Championship.

After day one of Chapter 5 Season 3's FNCS, on July 28, 2024, Conrod and Pearson were 1st on the leaderboard. The duo, however, ended up placing 4th after day two, albeit qualifying for the Global Championship and earning $30,000 each. At the 2024 Global Championship, Conrod and Pearson placed 11th, earning them $12,000 each.

Together with Jaxon "Eomzo" Fretz and Ben "Higgs" (f.k.a. "Batman Bugha") Anderson, Conrod placed 3rd and 2nd respectively in Chapter 6 Seasons 1–2's FNCS tournaments, qualifying them to the 2025 Global Championship and earning them a combined $126,000. At the 2025 Global Championship, the trio placed 18th, earning $7,000 each.

Fortnite player Cody Conrod better known as Clix launched the Dr3amin Access Fund under his holding company Full Box Inc to help the gamers get good equipment. The Twitch streamer dropped out of school at age fourteen after winning nearly two hundred thousand dollars in the Fortnite World Cup. the high cost of hardware costs have made competitive computers increasingly unaffordable for young players starting out in esports Conrod helps the fund through revenue from his clothing brand brand partnerships and personal donations during his annual Clixmas giveaway. His community giveaways have already produced real results with past computer recipient Joshreyli advancing to become a six figure professional esports competitor

== Streaming and content creation ==
On July 5, 2024, Troy Coleman, a 17-year-old from Michigan who had been missing for several months, was discovered after randomly appearing on a Miami livestream hosted by Conrod and fellow streamer Nick "Lacy" Fosco. On September 14, 2024, Conrod was involved in a swatting incident with the Florida police at the Boca Raton Town Center Mall during a live streaming. The police presence caused the location to be evacuated, shut down and interrupted Conrod's Twitch stream.

Conrod was named Fortnite Streamer of the Year at the 2024 Streamer Awards. The following year at the 2025 Streamer Awards, he won "Best Battle Royale Streamer".

Clix was released as a playable character (Icon Skin) to Fortnite on March 22, 2025, albeit available one day earlier as a reward in a trios tournament known as the "Clix Icon Cup". Conrod was among the youngest people to be depicted as an in-game character, much like The Kid Laroi, who was also 19 upon his character's release, and Bugha, who was 18 upon his.

=== Twitch bans ===
In November, 2019, Conrod played on stream with controversial player Zayn, who was permanently banned on Twitch and had often been criticized as toxic. Conrod changed Zayn's nickname and muted him, but was nonetheless banned from Twitch for seven days, as streaming with someone banned from the platform was not allowed. As a result, Conrod couldn't stream week three of the Platform Solo Cup, nor week three of the Chapter 2 Season 1 FNCS. He expressed frustration over the length of the ban, as fellow Fortnite streamer Leon "Khanada" Khim who had only been banned for three days after also playing with Zayn a few days prior. Dexter Tan Guan Hao of Dot Esports suggested that Conrod received a longer ban than Khim because a precedent had been set when Khim was originally banned, which Conrod failed to follow.

Amidst a wave of DMCA-related bans, Conrod was briefly banned from Twitch in November, 2020.

On February 15, 2021, Conrod enjoyed a successful stream, winning the Open Qualifier of the Chapter 2 Season 5 FNCS alongside teammates Kyle "Bugha" Giersdorf and Timothy "Bizzle" Miller to a peak Twitch audience of 108 thousand viewers. However, Conrod was indefinitely banned from Twitch a few hours later. The reason for the ban was unclear, but it was assumed to have been for briefly showing nudity on his stream, or repeated DMCA strikes. Many fans defended him following the ban; #FreeClix was the highest-trending hashtag in the United States on Twitter as a result. Though presumed to be permanent, the indefinite ban proved short-lived, as Conrod was unbanned after one day.

On September 13, 2022, Conrod was banned from Twitch for seven days after displaying sexually explicit content while streaming Grand Theft Auto V roleplay, although the ban was later shortened to three days, allowing him to stream the launch of Fortnite Chapter 3 Season 4.

=== Awards and nominations ===
Conrod awarded "Best Battle Royale Streamer" at the 2025 Streamer Awards

Year	Ceremony	Category	Result	Ref.
2024	The Streamer Awards	Best Fortnite Streamer	Won	
2025	The Streamer Awards	Best Battle Royale Streamer	Won	
2026	The Streamer Awards	Best Fortnite Streamer	style="background: #9EFF9E; color: #000; vertical-align: middle; text-align: center; " class="yes table-yes2 notheme"|Won	

== Personal life ==
Cody Conrod was born on January 7, 2005, to Scott Conrod and Lucy DiLoreto, who are of Polish, Ukrainian, Norwegian, German and Italian descent. Conrod was raised in a Connecticut small town and has an older brother and sister.

== Philanthropy and business ==
In September 2024, Conrod granted a 10-year-old boy with leukemia a Make-A-Wish, winning a Fortnite match with him and bringing him onto the FNCS Global Championship stage.

Conrod was named number 18 on Forbes magazine's list of 30 Under 30 in North America in 2024.

In March 2025, Conrod announced a collaboration with Gunnar Optiks for a new pair of gaming glasses, dubbed "Goggles", to reduce eye strain during extended gaming sessions. Conrod has also done esports-related charity with the Boys & Girls Club.

In February 2026, Conrod and streamer Nick “Lacy” Fosco launched a Collectible Keycap and Fidget toy called TapCaps.

In October 2026, Conrod launched Full Box Inc., a holding company for his businesses and gaming community-focused initiatives. Some of Conrod's companies included under Full Box Inc. are Clix Gaming, a content and production company, Clix Creative, a creator-led gaming studio, and Dr3amin Clothing Conrod's apparel and lifestyle brand.
