= Fortnite World Cup =

Esports competition based on the video game Fortnite

- Most recent season or competition: 2019
- Game: Fortnite
- Founded: 2019
- Owner: Epic Games
- Venue: Arthur Ashe Stadium
- Most recent champion: Kyle "Bugha" Giersdorf (2019)

The Fortnite World Cup was an esports competition based on the video game Fortnite. It took place between July 26–28, 2019 at Arthur Ashe Stadium in New York City, United States. A total US$30 million prize pool was available across the various competitions.

== Overview ==
The Fortnite World Cup used two of the game modes available to the video game, Fortnite. Both the main World Cup event and the Fortnite Pro-Am tournament used Fortnite Battle Royale, a battle royale game where up to 100 players airdrop onto an island without any weapons or armor, save for a pickaxe. Players can use gathered resources to build structures to use as cover from attacks. The last player or team left alive wins.

The Fortnite World Cup had online events over 10 weeks from April to June 2019 for people to place. The weeks alternated between solo players and duos teams. During the Saturday of each week, any player or duo could compete with others by geographic region, playing up to 10 matches to earn points through eliminations and victories. The top three thousand players/teams from each region then competed on the Sunday event, again playing up to ten matches to earn points. The top point-scorers in each region from the Sunday event then proceed through to the World Cup, a total of about twenty players/teams each week.

An estimated 40 million players vied for spots in the solo and duos World Cup. In the World Cup finals, the competitors played a total of six matches, with points earned for the highest finishers. The solo player or duo with the highest point total after six matches won the grand prize, with other players getting part of the prize pool available. All solo players received a minimum of US$50,000 for reaching the finals, with the top prize being US$3 million. Similarly, each duo team in the final received a minimum of US$100,000 with the top team winning US$3 million.

The Fortnite Creative Cup had a similar online process to select the players for the finals, taking place over five two-week periods from April to June 2019. Each active week, a new Creative challenge is available. Players, once completed with their Creative island, must submit a video of that challenge to Epic in that period. For each period, Epic selected three of the best entries by a panel of judges. Each selected entry earns a cash prize of US$5,000 and a guaranteed spot in the Creative Cup finals. From the fifteen winning entries, five were selected by Epic to be used in the Creative Cup finales.

In the finales, eight teams of four, consisting of those that had their Creative island selected and other notable Fortnite players, complete in these five events to earn the best overall score. The winners in the finale split a US$3 million prize pool.

The teams for the Fortnite Pro-Am are selected by Epic Games, with each team made up of a Fortnite streamer and a celebrity. The teams each played five matches, with a scoring system for the winning teams. The team with the highest overall score after five matches won the Pro-Am. Each team received a minimum of US$20,000 with the winning team receiving US$2 million.

== History ==
Epic Games had launched Fortnite in its original planned form, now known as Fortnite Save the World, as an early access title in July 2017, around the same time that the first influential battle royale game, PlayerUnknown's Battlegrounds (PUBG) was released. Inspired by this, Epic created a variation of Fortnite and released it as Fortnite Battle Royale in September 2017. While free-to-play, the game was supported by microtransactions. Fortnite Battle Royale rapidly became popular, and by June 2018, with the game ported to computer, consoles, and mobile devices, had reached 125 million players. Total 2018 revenue for Fortnite Battle Royale was estimated at $2.4 billion by analysis firm SuperData Research. Epic designated US$100 million of these revenues to position Fortnite Battle Royale as an esport.

The inaugural Fortnite World Cup was first announced in February 2019. While Epic planned to run the event in 2020, the COVID-19 pandemic led Epic to cancel the event for the year, though will still hold other Fortnite seasonal championship events known as Fortnite Champion Series. The event would later also not return in 2021 also due to the COVID-19 pandemic, and in subsequent years since 2022 despite the effects of the COVID-19 pandemic having receded.

== 2019 events ==
=== Format ===
The Fortnite World Cup was split into two different events, one for solo players, and a separate for two-player teams, or duos.

Both the solos and duos formats consisted of six matches.

World Cup solo and duo final standings:

=== Solos ===
The 2019 solo event finals were held on July 28, 2019, and was won by 16-year-old American Kyle "Bugha" Giersdorf, who took home the US$3 million grand prize.

The scoring format in solos provided points for eliminations and for placement. Competitors received one point for each elimination and non-cumulative placement points. For solos the placement points were as follows:

- 16th-25th, 3 points
- 15th-6th, 5 points
- 5th-2nd, 7 points
- Victory Royale (1st), 10 points

| Place | Player | Points | Prize Money |
|---|---|---|---|
| 1st | Bugha | 59 | $3,000,000 |
| 2nd | psalm | 33 | $1,800,000 |
| 3rd | EpikWhale | 32 | $1,200,000 |
| 4th | Kreo | 30 | $1,050,000 |
| 5th | k1nG | 30 | $900,000 |
| 6th | crue | 27 | $600,000 |
| 7th | Skite | 26 | $525,000 |
| 8th | nayte | 26 | $375,000 |
| 9th | Riversan | 24 | $300,000 |
| 10th | Fatch | 24 | $225,000 |
| 11th | Rhux | 23 | $150,000 |
| 12th | Tchub | 23 | $150,000 |
| 13th | Mongraal | 23 | $150,000 |
| 14th | Stompy | 22 | $150,000 |
| 15th | Dubs | 21 | $150,000 |
| 16th | Pika | 21 | $112,500 |
| 17th | BELAEU | 21 | $112,500 |
| 18th | Clix | 20 | $112,500 |
| 19th | Peterpan | 20 | $112,500 |
| 20th | Commandment | 20 | $112,500 |
| 21st | Domentos | 20 | $50,000 |
| 22nd | Skailer | 19 | $50,000 |
| 23rd | Bizzle | 19 | $50,000 |
| 24th | Endretta | 19 | $50,000 |
| 25th | benjyfishy | 19 | $50,000 |

| Place | Player | Points | Prize Money |
|---|---|---|---|
| 26th | Kinstaar | 18 | $50,000 |
| 27th | kurtz | 18 | $50,000 |
| 28th | Klass | 17 | $50,000 |
| 29th | MrSavage | 17 | $50,000 |
| 30th | K1nzell | 17 | $50,000 |
| 31st | fwexY | 16 | $50,000 |
| 32nd | LeTsHe | 16 | $50,000 |
| 33rd | TAKAMURA | 16 | $50,000 |
| 34th | Pzuhs | 16 | $50,000 |
| 35th | RogueShark | 16 | $50,000 |
| 36th | Zayt | 16 | $50,000 |
| 37th | Issa | 16 | $50,000 |
| 38th | Vivid | 16 | $50,000 |
| 39th | 4DRStorm | 15 | $50,000 |
| 40th | DiegoGB | 14 | $50,000 |
| 41st | LeftEye | 14 | $50,000 |
| 42nd | kolorful | 14 | $50,000 |
| 43rd | teeq | 14 | $50,000 |
| 44th | smeef | 14 | $50,000 |
| 45th | DRG | 14 | $50,000 |
| 46th | Prisi0n3r0 | 13 | $50,000 |
| 47th | Klusia | 13 | $50,000 |
| 48th | wakie | 13 | $50,000 |
| 49th | Core | 13 | $50,000 |
| 50th | Chenkinz | 13 | $50,000 |

| Place | Player | Points | Prize Money |
|---|---|---|---|
| 51st | Nicks | 12 | $50,000 |
| 52nd | JarkoS | 12 | $50,000 |
| 53rd | Arkhram | 12 | $50,000 |
| 54th | Evilmare | 12 | $50,000 |
| 55th | Hood.J | 12 | $50,000 |
| 56th | clarityG | 12 | $50,000 |
| 57th | leleo | 12 | $50,000 |
| 58th | lolb0om | 12 | $50,000 |
| 59th | letw1k3 | 11 | $50,000 |
| 60th | Ceice | 11 | $50,000 |
| 61st | Aspect | 11 | $50,000 |
| 62nd | Megga | 11 | $50,000 |
| 63rd | Fledermoys | 11 | $50,000 |
| 64th | Bucke | 11 | $50,000 |
| 65th | Banny | 10 | $50,000 |
| 66th | Emqu | 10 | $50,000 |
| 67th | Tfue | 7 | $50,000 |
| 68th | sozmann | 6 | $50,000 |
| 69th | UnknownxArmy | 6 | $50,000 |
| 70th | Kawzmik | 6 | $50,000 |
| 71st | Lasers | 6 | $50,000 |
| 72nd | Erouce | 5 | $50,000 |
| 73rd | FaxFox | 5 | $50,000 |
| 74th | snow | 5 | $50,000 |
| 75th | drakoNz | 5 | $50,000 |

| Place | Player | Points | Prize Money |
|---|---|---|---|
| 76th | Touzii | 4 | $50,000 |
| 77th | Luneze | 4 | $50,000 |
| 78th | slaya | 4 | $50,000 |
| 79th | Blax | 4 | $50,000 |
| 80th | LYGHT | 4 | $50,000 |
| 81st | BlastR | 3 | $50,000 |
| 82nd | luki | 3 | $50,000 |
| 83rd | Link | 3 | $50,000 |
| 84th | marteen | 3 | $50,000 |
| 85th | karhu | 2 | $50,000 |
| 86th | Robabz | 2 | $50,000 |
| 87th | Astonish | 2 | $50,000 |
| 88th | Snayzy | 2 | $50,000 |
| 89th | Legedien | 2 | $50,000 |
| 90th | Reverse2k | 1 | $50,000 |
| 91st | Maufin | 1 | $50,000 |
| 92nd | Nittle | 1 | $50,000 |
| 93rd | Hornet | 1 | $50,000 |
| 94th | aqua | 1 | $50,000 |
| 95th | Cat | 1 | $50,000 |
| 96th | twins | 1 | $50,000 |
| 97th | Herrions | 0 | $50,000 |
| 98th | Clipnode | 0 | $50,000 |
| 99th | Funk | 0 | $50,000 |
| 100th | Arius | 0 | $50,000 |

=== Duos ===
The duo event finals were held on July 27, 2019, with Emil Bergquist Pedersen ("Nyhrox") and David Wang ("Aqua") sharing its US$3 million grand prize.

The scoring format in duos provided points for eliminations and for placement. Competitors received one point for each elimination and non-cumulative placement points. For duos the placement points were as follows:

- 15th-11th, 3 points
- 10th-6th, 5 points
- 5th-2nd, 7 points
- Victory Royale (1st), 10 points

| Place | Team | Points | Prize money |
|---|---|---|---|
| 1st | Nyhrox + Aqua | 51 | $3,000,000 |
| 2nd | Rojo + Wolfiez | 47 | $2,250,000 |
| 3rd | Elevate + Ceice | 45 | $1,800,000 |
| 4th | Saf + Zayt | 44 | $1,500,000 |
| 5th | Arkhram1x + Falconer | 44 | $900,000 |
| 6th | Mongraal + Mitr0 | 40 | $450,000 |
| 7th | Megga + Dubs | 38 | $375,000 |
| 8th | Derox + itemm | 36 | $375,000 |
| 9th | Zexrow + Vinny1x | 35 | $225,000 |
| 10th | Vato + Skite | 31 | $225,000 |
| 11th | Deadra + M11Z | 30 | $100,000 |
| 12th | EpikWhale + storm | 29 | $100,000 |
| 13th | Noward + 4zr | 27 | $100,000 |
| 14th | benjyfishy + MrSavage | 27 | $100,000 |
| 15th | Keys + Slackes | 27 | $100,000 |
| 16th | MackWood + Calculator | 26 | $100,000 |
| 17th | Spades + Crimz | 26 | $100,000 |
| 18th | hype + Serpennt | 26 | $100,000 |
| 19th | BadSniper + Oslo | 24 | $100,000 |
| 20th | Scarlet + bell | 24 | $100,000 |
| 21st | Th0masHD + Klusia | 24 | $100,000 |
| 22nd | Chapix + Crue | 24 | $100,000 |
| 23rd | Kinstaar + Hunter | 23 | $100,000 |
| 24th | znappy + RedRush | 23 | $100,000 |
| 25th | Tschinken + stompy | 22 | $100,000 |

| Place | Team | Points | Prize money |
|---|---|---|---|
| 26th | Tuckz + Vorwenn | 22 | $100,000 |
| 27th | KBB + YuWang | 18 | $100,000 |
| 28th | ronaldo + XXiF | 17 | $100,000 |
| 29th | Nikof + Airwaks | 15 | $100,000 |
| 30th | Lanjok + Punisher | 15 | $100,000 |
| 31st | Nate Hill + Funk | 14 | $100,000 |
| 32nd | letw1k3 + fwexY | 12 | $100,000 |
| 33rd | JAMSIDE + 7ssk7 | 11 | $100,000 |
| 34th | Tetchra + Eclipsae | 11 | $100,000 |
| 35th | Sceptic + Clix | 11 | $100,000 |
| 36th | CizLucky + Brush | 11 | $100,000 |
| 37th | Aydan + Sean | 10 | $100,000 |
| 38th | little + jay | 9 | $100,000 |
| 39th | KING + xown | 9 | $100,000 |
| 40th | parpy + volx | 9 | $100,000 |
| 41st | Leno + Barl | 9 | $100,000 |
| 42nd | Ming + Puzz | 8 | $100,000 |
| 43rd | LeNain + Tyler15 | 8 | $100,000 |
| 44th | Quinten + Lnuef | 6 | $100,000 |
| 45th | Skram + Mexe | 5 | $100,000 |
| 46th | RoAtDW + BlooTea | 4 | $100,000 |
| 47th | pfzin + Nicks | 4 | $100,000 |
| 48th | wisheydp + GusTavox8 | 3 | $100,000 |
| 49th | xMende + XXM | 2 | $100,000 |
| 50th | CoverH + Twizz | 2 | $100,000 |

=== Creative Cup ===
The creative cup involved 8 teams, each led by a popular Fortnite icon. The team leaders held qualifiers, in which they had those attempting to qualify participate in a challenge in creative mode. The top 3 performers on each challenge were recruited to their respective leader's team. The cup included three different creative game maps: a king of the hill map, a prop hunt map, and a death run map. Each map had one round with three matches dedicated to it, and the final round had one match on each map. In the end, the “Fish Fam” led by FaZe Clan's Cizzorz won the event.

Creative Cup final standings:

| Place | Team | Prize money |
|---|---|---|
| 1st | Fish Fam | $1,345,000 |
| 2nd | Funky Fighters | $345,000 |
| 3rd | Ravens' Revenge | $315,000 |
| 4th | Lil Whip Warriors | $295,000 |
| 5th | Chicken Champions | $270,000 |
| 6th | Llama Record Co. | $250,000 |
| 7th | Sunshine Soldiers | $235,000 |
| 8th | Cuddle Crew | $195,000 |

=== Pro-Am ===
The 2019 Fortnite Pro-Am matched 50 popular Fortnite streamers with various celebrities, and was held on July 26, 2019, at The Forum In Los Angeles, CA, for a US$1 million prize to be split between the winning pair to go to charities of their choice. Streamer Airwaks and music producer RL Grime won the event, their second win after a similar Pro-Am event at E3 2019, with their selected charities being the World Wildlife Fund and the American Civil Liberties Union, respectively. Other teams split the remaining US$3 million prize pool for charity, with each team assured a minimum of US$20,000.

Pro-Am final standings:

| Place | Team | Points | Prize money |
|---|---|---|---|
| 1st | Airwaks + RL GRIME | 52 | $1,000,000 |
| 2nd | SinOoh + Oking | 40 | $500,000 |
| 3rd | Jelty + Gaborever | 39 | $250,000 |
| 4th | Jacob + Clare Grant | 35 | $100,000 |
| 5th | Tfue + Nav | 35 | $85,000 |
| 6th | JT Brown + Marksman | 33 | $75,000 |
| 7th | Vinnie Pergola + Symfuhny | 31 | $65,000 |
| 8th | Sean O'Malley + CouRageJD | 30 | $55,000 |
| 9th | Witt Lowry + Cloak | 31 | $40,000 |
| 10th | Nickmercs + Mario Hezonja | 25 | $30,000 |
| 11th | Ninja + Marshmello | 24 | $20,000 |
| 12th | Michael Drayer + Myth | 24 | $20,000 |
| 13th | Robert Abisi + Aydan | 23 | $20,000 |
| 14th | Robleis + Chigua | 23 | $20,000 |
| 15th | MrFreshAsian + Desmond Chiam | 22 | $20,000 |
| 16th | David Williams + WILDCAT | 19 | $20,000 |
| 17th | Nick Shanholtz + Sean | 18 | $20,000 |
| 18th | Liam McIntyre + Lachlan | 17 | $20,000 |
| 19th | FearItSelf + MacKenzie Bourg | 16 | $20,000 |
| 20th | DJ Van + iFaris | 13 | $20,000 |
| 21st | Calango + Caue Moura | 13 | $20,000 |
| 22nd | Sev7n + PC Siqueira | 13 | $20,000 |
| 23rd | Jawn Ha + Wade | 12 | $20,000 |
| 24th | Nick Eh 30 + Max Carver | 11 | $20,000 |
| 25th | Jordan Fisher + Ewok | 10 | $20,000 |

| Place | Team | Points | Prize money |
|---|---|---|---|
| 26th | Cody Walker + Doigby | 8 | $20,000 |
| 27th | Neckokun + ELLY | 8 | $20,000 |
| 28th | Dante + TimTheTatman | 8 | $20,000 |
| 29th | Wax Motif + Muselk | 8 | $20,000 |
| 30th | Aaron Gordon + Ali-A | 7 | $20,000 |
| 31st | Oscurlod + Dedreviil | 7 | $20,000 |
| 32nd | DrLupo + Sigala | 6 | $20,000 |
| 33rd | ONE_Shot_Gurl + Chandler Riggs | 5 | $20,000 |
| 34th | ALEXANDER + VODKA | 4 | $20,000 |
| 35th | Theslayer360 + Greer Grammer | 3 | $20,000 |
| 36th | Kyle Kaplan + Kay | 3 | $20,000 |
| 37th | Friz + Bizness Boi | 3 | $20,000 |
| 38th | Slogoman + Jeremy Ray Taylor | 3 | $20,000 |
| 39th | EduKof + Flakes Power | 3 | $20,000 |
| 40th | Loserfruit + Alison Wonderland | 2 | $20,000 |
| 41st | Alexia Raye + Jordyn Jones | 1 | $20,000 |
| 42nd | Pai Tamben Joga + Detonator | 1 | $20,000 |
| 43rd | Ashley Rickards + Exile | 1 | $20,000 |
| 44th | Jared Abrahamson + Zorman | 1 | $20,000 |
| 45th | Freddie Stroma + Yoshi | 1 | $20,000 |
| 46th | DenkOps + Xavier Woods | 0 | $20,000 |
| 47th | Joey Fatone + XpertThief | 0 | $20,000 |
| 48th | Edwin Hodge + FRAPZZ | 0 | $20,000 |
| 49th | RJ Mitte + Moyorz87 | 0 | $20,000 |
| 50th | ActionJaxon + Sarunas Jackson | 0 | $20,000 |

=== Other activities ===
In addition to the games in the stadium, the area around the stadium in Flushing Meadows–Corona Park was set up for a number of fan events, such as contests and games, and a concert by Marshmello.

== Viewership ==
Epic reported that tickets for the 23,700-capacity stadium venue were sold out. An estimated 2.3 concurrent million viewers on Twitch and YouTube streaming services watched the World Cup finales; additional viewers included those watching the final events from within Fortnite, and China viewership.

== Later developments ==
Shortly after his win in the World Cup, Kyle “Bugha” Giersdorf had been swatted while streaming from his home. However, one of the officers responding to the call had recognized Giersdorf from his win, and quickly calmed the situation down to determine that they were responding to a false call.

There were not subsequent editions of the World Cup in 2020 and 2021 due to the COVID-19 pandemic and since 2022 despite the effects of the COVID-19 pandemic having receded. Since then, the highest level of Fortnite competitive matches were played in the Fortnite Championship Series (FNCS), which expanded into an LAN format in the years following the World Cup, starting with the FNCS Invitational in 2022 and followed by FNCS Majors and Global Championships from 2023 onwards.
