= Orange Justice =

Dance move

- Orange Justice dance
- Genre: Video game dance
- Inventor: "Orange Shirt Kid"
- Year: 2018
- Origin: Fortnite Battle Royale

Orange Justice is a dance move that gained popularity as part of the video game Fortnite Battle Royale. It is characterized by its energetic, exaggerated arm and leg movements, and it became a cultural phenomenon within the gaming and social media communities.

== Origins ==
The origin of Orange Justice can be traced back to a dance submission by a young boy known as "Orange Shirt Kid" during the Fortnite BoogieDown Contest in early 2018. The contest, held by Epic Games, the developer of Fortnite, invited players to submit videos of their dance moves for a chance to have them included in the game as emotes. In the submission video, he called it "The Random". Despite not winning the contest and getting 23rd place, Orange Shirt Kid's dance gained widespread popularity due to its unique and humorous movements. It led to a community campaign that started on a Reddit Fortnite page that promoted "Justice for Orange Shirt Kid". On Twitter, the hashtag #JusticeForOrangeShirtKid trended. A Change.org petition was created to convince Epic to add the dance.

== Adoption in Fortnite ==
Following a strong community push and the viral nature of the dance, Epic Games added Orange Justice to Fortnite Battle Royale as a reward for players who reached tier 26 of the Season 4 Battle Pass. The inclusion of the dance was largely seen as a response to the support from the Fortnite community, who felt that Orange Shirt Kid's dance deserved a spot in the game.

== Dance description ==
The dance involves a series of rapid, exaggerated movements starting with the dancer bending their knees and pumping their arms in a criss-cross pattern. This is followed by a shrug and a clap above the head.

== Reception and legacy ==
Orange Justice became one of the most recognizable dances in Fortnite, contributing to the game's cultural footprint. It has demonstrated the influence of player-driven content in modern video games and how community engagement can shape the development and content of a game. It has inspired memes, parodies, and dance challenges. It has even been used to promote fitness among youth. Michelle Obama performed the dance in one notable instance.

== Lawsuit ==
In 2019, Rachel McCumbers, the mother of Orange Shirt Kid, filed a lawsuit against Epic Games for "unauthorized misappropriation", essentially claiming that the company was monetizing the emotes without adequate credit or consent. This follows other suits from Alfonso Ribeiro, rapper 2 Milly, and Backpack Kid who all filed similar suits. The plaintiff pointed out the dance was named "Orange Justice" rather than the original name "The Random". Notably, the plaintiff’s case did not mention that the dance move was submitted as part of a contest which granted Epic Games use of it. Furthermore, in the United States, simple, unchoreographed dance moves are not protected under copyright law, though the attorney for the plaintiff did attempt to obtain copyright registration for Orange Shirt Kid's dance.
