= Fortnite Championship Series =

Fortnite Battle Royale tournament

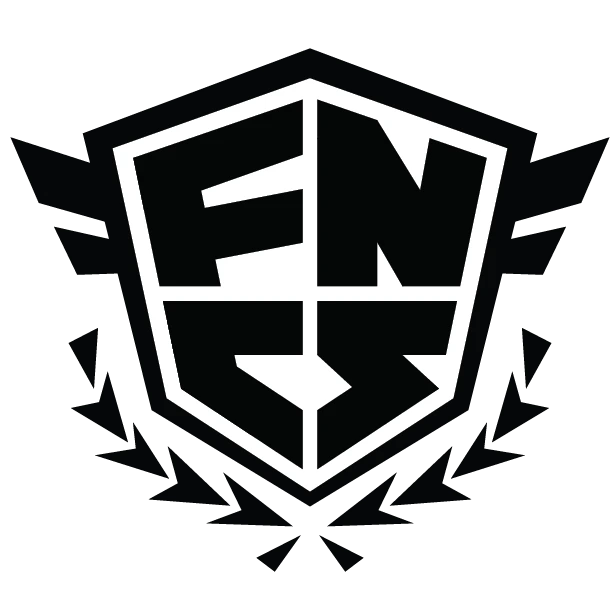
- Founded: 2019
- First season: Season X

The Fortnite Championship Series (FNCS), previously formally and still informally referred to as the Fortnite Champion Series, is the premier seasonal Fortnite Battle Royale tournament since 2019. FNCS is divided across seven regions, and generally takes place once every full length in-game season. From 2023 to 2025, the first three FNCS tournaments of each Chapter – known as "Majors" – have taken place during Seasons 1–3. These have served as qualifiers for the fourth season's FNCS Global Championship, an annual LAN tournament. This year's FNCS saw the addition of a mid-year FNCS LAN, and the absence of an FNCS during the first season.

Players earn FNCS leaderboard points through outlasting other players, or eliminating them. Although formats, squad sizes and points systems have changed over the years, the tournaments have always consisted of a set of qualification rounds and Grand Finals, whose victors are crowned "FNCS winners". Since 2025, Epic Games have also hosted annual in-person FNCS Pro-Am tournaments. Besides large prize money, winners are awarded an in-game harvesting tool known as the "Blade of Champions".

Not counting the FNCS Pro-Am, 31 FNCS events have been held—26 online and 5 global LAN tournaments.

== Regions ==
FNCS was initially contested across seven server regions: Europe, North America East, North America West, Brazil, Asia, Middle East, and Oceania. This lasted until 2023, when North America East and West were combined into North America Central. Ahead of the 2025 FNCS, North America West was reinstated a competitive region with North America Central remaining. On September 22, 2026, Epic Games announced the December 2026 reinstatement of North America East as a competitive region in a video featuring multiple-time FNCS winners Kyle "Bugha" Giersdorf, Leon "Khanada" Khim and Miguel "Pollo" Moreno, as well as Cody "Clix" Conrod. With proximity to a server providing an in-game advantage, the physical server locations are kept secret, but reverse-engineering gives the following locations, according to an article by ESTNN from 2024:

Server locations
Europe	North America (Note: Including North America East, West and Central)	Brazil	Asia	Middle East	Oceania
London; Paris; Ireland; Frankfurt; Milan; Helsinki	Portland; Columbus; San Francisco; Los Angeles; Kansas City; Washington, D.C.; Dallas	São Paulo	Mumbai; Singapore; Taiwan; Seoul; Tokyo	Bahrain	Sydney

Europe is often considered the hardest and most competitive region, with North America Central second in that regard. The two regions are the most-watched and feature the most prize money and FNCS Global Championship qualification spots.

== History ==
=== 2017–2019: Pre-FNCS ===
Epic Games didn't host any major regular Fortnite tournaments before FNCS. Instead, one-off tournaments such as the Fortnite Pro-Am, Summer Skirmish, Fall Skirmish and Winter Royale – each featuring $1,000,000 or more in prize money – were held in 2018. Notably, the Fall Skirmish series experienced server issues due to large amounts of players surviving into the closing stages of matches. This prompted Epic Games to introduce a game mechanic known as "storm surge", dealing damage to the players who have dealt the least amount of damage in case the player count exceeds a given threshold at a given stage of the match. This mechanic effectively motivates players to engage in combat, and plays an important role in FNCS tournaments to this day.

The Fortnite World Cup was announced in February 2019. Initially intended as an annual event, the COVID-19 pandemic rendered it a one-off tournament; Fortnite world champions are crowned at Global Championships nowadays.

=== 2019–2021: Early tournaments with changing team sizes ===
FNCS was first announced by Epic Games at the Fortnite World Cup. To compete in the first FNCS tournament, Season X, players had to achieve an in-game rank of "Champion", hence the name Fortnite Champion Series. Players in teams of three competed in five weekly tournaments, each awarding cumulative series points to qualify trios for the "Heats", these being set groups qualifying the highest-performing trios to the "Grand Finals". An age limit of 13 was set for FNCS participation, which persists to this day.

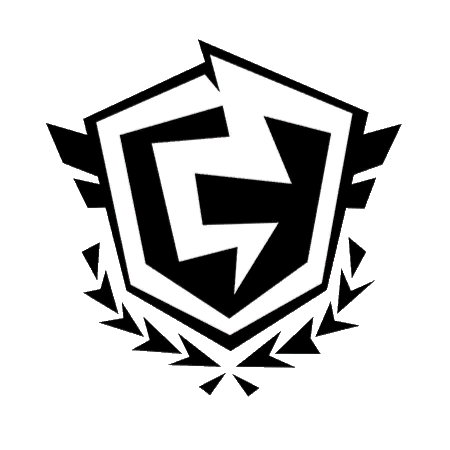
The logo used for FNCS in Chapter 2 (colors varied)

The system of weekly tournaments with cumulative series points, heats and Grand Finals remained into Chapter 2, but the team size changed to four players in Season 1, and two in Season 2. Starting in Chapter 2 Season 2, FNCS winners were awarded the Axe of Champions – an in-game harvesting tool with the FNCS logo – to use for the season following their victory.

During Week 1 of the North America East Chapter 2 Season 2 FNCS, duos Slackes and Keys; and Logan "Bucke" Eschenburg and Nate "Kreo" Kou, both of which were landing at the Slurpy Swamp location, were accused of colluding to circumvent the storm surge mechanic, trading shots and healing continuously without engaging in a serious fight. The duos finished the tournament first and second, respectively. Eschenburg argued on Twitter that they had trading similarly with other teams, and Keys argued that the practice was common in the competitive community. Nevertheless, Epic Games had explicitly disallowed collusion in any sense; thus, the four players – all of whom had previously qualified for the World Cup – were banned from competitive Fortnite for 60 days on March 23, 2020.

A recurring complaint during the early FNCS tournaments of Chapter 2 was the overpowered nature of "aim assist" – an in-game setting compensating for the supposed disadvantage of controller as opposed to keyboard and mouse. Then highest-followed Twitch streamer in the world and FNCS player Tyler "Ninja" Blevins was among those critical of aim assist. This was supported by clips of controller players "beaming" their enemies, i.e. hitting abnormally many shots in a row, notably from Chapter 2 Season 1 FNCS winner Domnick "UnknownxArmy" Green. Although FNCS was split between PC and console/mobile from Seasons 2–4 of Chapter 2, Epic Games weakened aim assist several times in 2020.

On April 24, 2020, Epic Games announced the FNCS Invitational; a solo tournament across all regions. The tournament – taking place in May, 2020 – featured the Grand Finalists from all previous FNCS tournaments, along with 100 players having qualified from an open qualifier, and up to 100 players invited by Epic Games.

The Chapter 2 Season 3 FNCS was also played in solos, but the game mode switched back to trios for the rest of Chapter 2's regular FNCS tournaments, starting in Season 4, with the series points and heats system remaining.

In June, 2021, Epic Games hosted the FNCS All-Star Showdown, which was contested in several events; its Battle Royale tournament was played in solos. It featured one qualifying round and one Grand Finals across all regions. Then, in Chapter 2 Season 8, Epic Games hosted the 2021 FNCS Grand Royale; a trio FNCS featuring qualification rounds on November 11–14 and Grand Finals on November 19–21. These events were played apart from the regular seasonal FNCS tournaments.

=== 2022–2024: Seasonal duos tournaments and annual global LANs ===
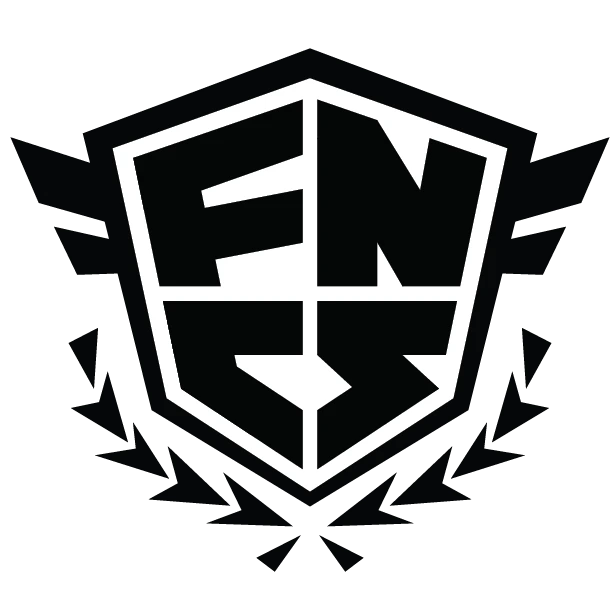
The logo used for FNCS in Chapter 3 and onwards (colors vary)

In 2022, following the launch of Chapter 3, the competitive game mode switched to duos. The chapter featured three seasonal FNCS tournaments from which the 50 best-performing duos selected by Epic Games qualified to the FNCS Invitational 2022, taking place in Chapter 3 Season 4. Similar to previous FNCS tournaments, Chapter 3 FNCS tournaments consisted of a qualification stage awarding series points, semi-finals and Grand Finals. The original Axe of Champions was replaced by the "Axe of Champions 2.0", featuring the updated FNCS logo in Chapter 3 Season 2.

The FNCS Invitational 2022 was held in-person in Raleigh on November 11–12, 2022.

Chapters 4 and 5 featured similar FNCS formats as Chapter 3, with the same team size and strictly seasonal tournaments. Epic Games did however lower the rank requirement to participate from "Champion" to "Contender", as well as naming the tournaments Major 1, 2, and 3 respectively, each Major taking place in the corresponding season. Additionally, the fourth season's Invitational LAN was replaced with a Global Championship, for which 50 qualification spots were awarded by high FNCS Grand Finals placements.

Upon a ranked system overhaul in May 2023, the barrier to entering FNCS tournaments was set to "Platinum" rank or above, starting in Chapter 4 Season 3. Additionally, "siphon", a gameplay mechanic giving giving Health and Shield to players upon eliminating an enemy player, was removed from the new ranked mode, as well as tournaments including FNCS, after having been a part of competitive Fortnite Battle Royale since the introduction of Arena Mode in 2019. The removal was poorly received among the community; streamer and professional player Cody "Clix" Conrod responded to its announcement on Twitter, writing "this gotta be a joke", with then five-time FNCS winner Matthew "Mero" Faitel responding by calling the removal a "crazy change".

In addition to Majors 1, 2, and 3, a "Last Chance Major" tournament was held in August, 2023, qualifying a further 25 duos to the 2023 FNCS Global Championship.

The 2023 FNCS Major 3 winners Egor "SwizzY" Luciko and Daniil "Putrick" Abdrakhmanov, and Last Chance Major qualifying duo NeFrizi and Vladislav "Howly" Korobkin; all Russian players, were disqualified for the 2023 FNCS Global Championship due to sanctions by Epic Games.

The 2023 FNCS Global Championship was held in Copenhagen on October 13–15, 2023. On the first day, the 49 qualified duos through Majors 1, 2 and 3 competed in the Upper Bracket for 25 spots in the third day's Grand Finals. On the second day, the bottom 24 duos in the Upper Bracket competed in the Lower Bracket against the 24 qualified duos from the Last Chance Major for the remaining 25 spots in the Grand Finals.

The Fortnite Champion Series was renamed to the "Fortnite Championship Series" ahead of Chapter 5. Much like Chapter 4, Chapter 5 featured three FNCS Majors and one FNCS Global Championship, the latter taking place in Fort Worth on September 7–8, 2024. There was no Last Chance Major in 2024, and the 2024 FNCS Global Championship featured 50 duos. Chapter 5's FNCS Majors each featured two open qualifiers each awarding series points, leading to semi finals consisting of a lower and upper bracket, in turn leading to the FNCS Grand Finals.

"woke up to the biggest change in meta before grands in fortnite history"

— FNCS player Martin "MrSavage" Foss Andersen on X

One day before the 2024 FNCS Major 3 Grand Finals, Epic Games updated the "slurp cacti", which gave players 30 effective health when harvested, to no longer respawn. The update was heavily criticized for its proximity to the Grand Finals, as many players' strategies revolved around trading damage with opponents and healing continuously with the slurp cacti to accumulate storm surge damage.

=== 2025–present: Divisional system ===
2024 siphon trials
Dates	Details
September 24–30	40 Effective Health instantly
October 1–7	50 Effective Health instantly
October 8–14	25 Effective Health instantly
October 15-21	75 Health over time
October 22–28	50 Health instantly
October 29–November 4	25 Health and 25 Shield instantly

Following the 2024 Global Championship, Epic Games reintroduced siphon in the form of "siphon trials", which saw different variations of siphon introduced to the Ranked mode and tournaments on a weekly basis during a six-week period between September and November 2024. The mechanic has stayed in tournaments since then.

Ahead of Chapter 6, which launched in December 2024, the Axe of Champions 2.0 was replaced by a new harvesting tool known as the "Blade of Champions". Chapter 6 saw the competitive game mode switching to trios, as well as the introduction of Divisional Cups. To compete in the FNCS Play-Ins, in turn qualifying trios for the Grand Finals, players had to reach Division 1, the highest among 3. Last Chance Qualifiers were also held, in which players from all divisions could play. Albeit not part of the main competitive circuit, Epic Games hosted the 2025 FNCS Pro-Am in Los Angeles, on May 10, 2025. It featured 20 pairings of professional players and content creators and was played in the Reload game mode.

The 2025 FNCS Global Championship took place in Lyon on September 6–7, 2025. During the event, Epic Games unveiled the competitive roadmap for 2026, revealing the return of duos as the competitive game mode, a mid-season LAN, a Reload Elite Series LAN, a $1,000,000 Mobile Series, Ranked 2.0, the return of the FNCS Pro-Am, and the return of the FNCS Global Championship to Europe.

In October, 2025, Epic Games updated the problematic storm surge mechanic to take into account net damage, as opposed to total dealt damage. This change intended to combat the prevalent strategy known as "surge trading", in which teams would build towers and trade shots without fighting, a strategy that sometimes led to teaming allegations. The update received generally positive reactions from professional players.

Epic Games provided a calendar for FNCS 2026 in December, 2025, in which it was revealed that Chapter 7 Season 1 would be without an FNCS. This marked the first full-length season without an FNCS since its inception in 2019. However, the FNCS Trial, determining duos' division, took place on January 31, in Season 1. Much like in Chapter 6, players have to reach Division 1 – the highest among 5 on Europe and North America Central, and 3 on the other regions – to play in the FNCS Play-Ins ahead of each Major, with a Last Chance Qualifier also open for players from all divisions. A new harvesting tool for FNCS winners, the Axe of Champions 3.0, was introduced. The 2026 FNCS Major 1 qualified players to the FNCS Major 1 Summit, a $1,000,000 LAN tournament in Düsseldorf originally set to take place on May 30–31 and feature the 50 duos that qualified from Major 1. The controversial disqualification of several players – most notably Fortnite World Cup winner Kyle "Bugha" Giersdorf – ahead of the Major 1 Grand Finals caused Epic Games to add a "Second Chance Qualifier", 25 duos and another day of competing for the LAN. The top 15 duos at the Major 1 Summit qualified for the 2026 FNCS Global Championship. At the LAN, Epic Games announced an updated FNCS roadmap, removing FNCS Major 3 and adding a solo FNCS.

Though not part of FNCS, the Reload Elite Series played an important role in players' esports organization affiliations in 2026, with the tournament, played in Fortnite Reload, qualifying duos for the 2026 Esports World Cup. Notably, organization Gen.G returned to Fortnite after five years, signing former FNCS winners Aidan "Ajerss" Bernero and Maguire "Ritual" Morton.

On September 12, 2026, Epic Games announced that the team size of the upcoming FNCS 2027 would be decided by the community. In a vote lasting until the Global Championship on September 26–27, players can vote for either duos or trios on an official Fortnite Creative map known as "Legends Landing".

== Tournaments ==
Region key
Europe	North America			Brazil	Asia	Middle East	Oceania
Europe	East	Central	West	Brazil	Asia	Middle East	Oceania
EU	NAE	NAC	NAW	BR	ASIA	ME	OCE

Official name (Note: FNCS stands for: Fortnite Champion Series (until 2023); Fortnite Championship Series (since 2024))	Start date	End date	Chapter	Season	Game mode	LAN
FNCS: Season X	August 16, 2019	September 22, 2019	1	X (Note: 10 in Roman numerals)	Trios	No (Note: Contested on Europe, North America East, North America West, Brazil, Asia, Middle East, and Oceania servers)
FNCS: Chapter 2 – Season 1	November 2, 2019	December 8, 2019	2	1	Squads (Note: Squads consisting of four players)	No
FNCS: Chapter 2 Season 2 (Note: Tournament split into PC and console/mobile)	March 20, 2020	April 19, 2020	2	2	Duos	No
FNCS – Invitational	May 1, 2020	May 24, 2020	2	2	Solos	No
FNCS: Chapter 2 Season 3	July 31, 2020	August 16, 2020	2	3	Solos	No
FNCS: Chapter 2 Season 4	October 8, 2020	November 1, 2020	2	4	Trios	No
FNCS: Chapter 2 Season 5	February 11, 2021	March 14, 2021	2	5	Trios	No
FNCS: Chapter 2 Season 6	April 22, 2021	May 30, 2021	2	6	Trios	No
FNCS All-Star Showdown (Note: Tournament included several events besides Battle Royale)	June 17, 2021	June 26, 2021	2	7	Solos	No
FNCS: Chapter 2 Season 7	July 29, 2021	September 5, 2021	2	7	Trios	No
FNCS: Chapter 2 Season 8	October 14, 2021	October 31, 2021	2	8	Trios	No
2021 FNCS Grand Royale	November 12, 2021	November 20, 2021	2	8	Trios	No
FNCS: Chapter 3 Season 1	February 17, 2022	March 6, 2022	3	1	Duos	No
FNCS: Chapter 3 Season 2	May 2, 2022	May 29, 2022	3	2	Duos	No
FNCS: Chapter 3 Season 3	July 6, 2022	August 14, 2022	3	3	Duos	No
FNCS Invitational 2022	November 12, 2022	November 13, 2022	3	4	Duos	Yes
Fortnite Champion Series 2023
FNCS Major 1 – 2023	February 2, 2023	March 5, 2023	4	1	Duos	No
FNCS Major 2 – 2023	April 13, 2023	May 14, 2023	4	2	Duos	No (Note: Contested on Europe, North America Central, Brazil, Asia, Middle East, and Oceania servers)
FNCS Major 3 – 2023	July 20, 2023	August 13, 2023	4	3	Duos	No
2023 FNCS Global Championship	October 13, 2023	October 15, 2023	4	4	Duos	Yes
Fortnite Championship Series 2024
FNCS Major 1 – 2024	January 26, 2024	February 25, 2024	5	1	Duos	No
FNCS Major 2 – 2024	April 12, 2024	May 12, 2024	5	2	Duos	No
FNCS Major 3 – 2024	June 14, 2024	July 28, 2024	5	3	Duos	No
2024 FNCS Global Championship	September 7, 2024	September 8, 2024	5	4	Duos	Yes
Fortnite Championship Series 2025
FNCS Major 1 – 2025	January 29, 2025	February 16, 2025	6	1	Trios	No (Note: Contested on Europe, North America Central, North America West, Brazil, Asia, Middle East, and Oceania servers)
FNCS Major 2 – 2025	April 9, 2025	April 27, 2025	6	2	Trios	No
FNCS Major 3 – 2025	July 16, 2025	August 3, 2025	6	3	Trios	No
2025 FNCS Global Championship	September 6, 2025	September 7, 2025	6	4	Trios	Yes
Fortnite Championship Series 2026
FNCS Major 1 – 2026	April 6, 2026	April 26, 2026	7	2	Duos	No
FNCS Major 1 Summit – 2026	May 29, 2026	May 31, 2026	7	2	Duos	Yes
FNCS Major 2 – 2026	July 18, 2026	August 2, 2026	7	3	Duos	No
2026 FNCS Global Championship	September 26, 2026	September 27, 2026	7	4	Duos	Yes
FNCS Solos – 2026	September 28, 2026	October 27, 2026	7	4	Solos	No
FNCS Solos Reload – 2026	November 21, 2026	November 22, 2026	7	5	Solos	No

Source: Epic Games
