= Phantoms (duo) =

Phantoms are a Los Angeles–based electronic dance music duo. The group consists of former teenage actors Kyle Kaplan and Vinnie Pergola.

== Career ==
Their eponymous debut album was released in March 2017. Their song "Just a Feeling", which was downloaded over 5,000 times, charted on the Dance/Mix Show Airplay chart at number 40. The album's first and second singles "Pulling Me In" and "Been Here Before" were released.

Before Phantoms was formed, Kaplan and Pergola listened to classic rock bands such as Led Zeppelin and Pink Floyd. They also had garage band. In 2007, the duo learnt and began producing electronic music. In 2016, they collaborated with Skylar Astin to release the single "Call My Name".

In 2017, they collaborated with Giorgio Moroder to release the song "Champagne, Secrets, & Chanel".

In October 2018, Phantoms collaborated with Vanessa Hudgens to release the single "Lay with Me", which came out on October 3, 2018.

On February 22, 2019, Phantoms released the single "Are You Up" featuring Shaylen.

== Discography ==
=== Singles ===
Title	Year	Peak chart position	Album
Title	Year	US Dance/Mix Airplay	Album
"Just a Feeling" (featuring Vérité)	2017	40	Phantoms
"Lay with Me" (featuring Vanessa Hudgens)	2018	40	Non-album single
"Say It" (featuring Anna Clendening)	2019	—	Disconnect EP
"One in a Million"	2020	—	Moonlight EP
"Want to Know"	2020	—	Moonlight EP
"Do It Again"	2021	—	Non-album single
"Lay It All on Me" (featuring Jem Cooke)	2022	—	TBA
