= Bugha (gamer) =

American professional esports player

Personal information
- Name: Kyle Giersdorf
- Born: December 30, 2002 (age 23)
- Nationality: American

Career information
- Game: Fortnite
- Playing career: 2018–present

Team history
- 2018: No Clout
- 2019–2022: Sentinels
- 2023–2025: Dignitas

Career highlights and awards
- Fortnite World Cup Champion (2019); 3x FNCS Champion (2021, 2022)

Twitch information
- Channel: Bugha
- Years active: 2018–present
- Followers: 5.5 million

YouTube information
- Channel: Bugha
- Years active: 2018–present
- Subscribers: 4.6 million
- Views: 378.3 million
- Last updated: October 14, 2024

Kyle Giersdorf (born December 30, 2002), better known by his online streamer name Bugha (/ˈbuːɡə/), is an American streamer on Twitch and professional Fortnite Battle Royale player. He won the Fortnite World Cup 2019 and is often regarded as the best Fortnite player of all time. Holding the distinction as the highest-earning Fortnite Battle Royale player, his World Cup victory alone earned him more prize money than any other player has accumulated.

== Early life ==
Giersdorf's nickname comes from his grandfather who used to call him Bugha when he was younger. He was first introduced to Fortnite when his father, also a gamer, told him about the Save the World game mode.

== Professional career ==
After playing with team No Clout, Giersdorf signed with esports organization Sentinels on March 25, 2019, as a member of their Fortnite team. Giersdorf qualified and attended the 1st Annual Fortnite World Cup that took place on July 26–28, 2019. He competed for Solos that took place on the 28th. Giersdorf had the chance to play 6 matches against 99 other players who had also qualified. Giersdorf finished first with 59 points, nearly doubling the 33 points scored by second-place finisher Psalm. Giersdorf won $3,000,000 in prize money.

Epic Games gave Giersdorf a cosmetic outfit of his likeness in July 2021 as part of Fortnite's Icon Series.

=== Hack ===
Hours after winning the Fortnite World Cup, Giersdorf's X (Twitter) and Twitch accounts were hacked. The attacker used his Twitch account to gift 100 subscriptions to random streamers and posted vulgar messages from his Twitter account.

== Awards and nominations ==
Year	Ceremony	Category	Result	Ref.
2019	The Game Awards	Best Esports Athlete	Won	
2020	Shorty Award	Best in Gaming	Won	
2020	Forbes 30 Under 30	Games	Included	

== FNCS results ==
Career FNCS results
Tournament					Result					
Official name	Start date	End date	Season	Team size	Team mate(s)	Region	Made Grand Finals	Placement	Earnings	Source(s)
FNCS: Season X	August 16, 2019	September 22, 2019	C1SX	Trios	(United States) clarityG & (United States) Stretch	NAE	Yes	26th	$26,000	
FNCS: Chapter 2 – Season 1	November 2, 2019	December 8, 2019	C2S1	Squads	(United States) thwifo, (United States) clarityG & (United States) Stretch	NAE	Yes	21st	$4,000	
FNCS: Chapter 2 Season 2	March 20, 2020	April 19, 2020	C2S2	Duos	(United States) Stretch	NAE	Yes	5th	$13,450	
FNCS – Invitational	May 1, 2020	May 24, 2020	C2S2	Solos	N/A	NAE	Yes	40th	$900	
FNCS: Chapter 2 Season 3	July 31, 2020	August 16, 2020	C2S3	Solos	N/A	NAE	Yes	4th	$28,200	
FNCS: Chapter 2 Season 4	October 8, 2020	November 1, 2020	C2S4	Trios	(Canada) Avery & (United States) Jamper	NAE	Yes	3rd	$7,050	
FNCS: Chapter 2 Season 5	February 11, 2021	March 14, 2021	C2S5	Trios	(United States) Clix & (United States) Bizzle	NAE	Yes	5th	$18,000	
FNCS: Chapter 2 Season 6	April 22, 2021	May 30, 2021	C2S6	Trios	(United States) Clix & (United States) Bizzle	NAE	Eliminated in heats	—		
FNCS All-Star Showdown	June 17, 2021	June 26, 2021	C2S7	Solos	N/A	NAE	Yes	21st	$3,500	
FNCS: Chapter 2 Season 7	July 29, 2021	September 5, 2021	C2S7	Trios	(Canada) Avery & (Canada) Nosh	NAE	Yes	8th	$8,000	
FNCS: Chapter 2 Season 8	October 14, 2021	October 31, 2021	C2S8	Trios	(Canada) Mero & (Australia) Muz	NAE	Yes	1st	$45,000	
2021 FNCS Grand Royale	November 12, 2021	November 20, 2021	C2S8	Trios	(Canada) Mero & (Mexico) Dukez	NAE	Yes	1st	$95,000	
FNCS: Chapter 3 Season 1	February 17, 2022	March 6, 2022	C3S1	Duos	(Canada) Mero	NAE	Yes	1st	$65,000	
FNCS: Chapter 3 Season 2	May 2, 2022	May 29, 2022	C3S2	Duos	(Canada) Mero	NAE	Yes	3rd	$35,000	
FNCS: Chapter 3 Season 3	July 6, 2022	August 14, 2022	C3S3	Duos	(Canada) Mero	NAE	Yes	2nd	$50,000	
FNCS Invitational 2022	November 12, 2022	November 13, 2022	C3S4	Duos	(Canada) Mero	Global	N/A	36th	$1,000	
FNCS Major 1 – 2023	February 2, 2023	March 5, 2023	C4S1	Duos	(United States) Peterbot	NAE	Yes	16th	$2,000	
FNCS Major 2 – 2023	April 13, 2023	May 14, 2023	C4S2	Duos	(Cuba) Threats	NAC	Yes	5th	$20,000	
FNCS Major 3 – 2023	July 20, 2023	August 13, 2023	C4S3	Duos	(Cuba) Threats	NAC	Yes	2nd	$47,500	
2023 FNCS Global Championship	October 13, 2023	October 15, 2023	C4S4	Duos	(Cuba) Threats	Global	Yes	23rd	$10,000	
FNCS Major 1 – 2024	January 26, 2024	February 25, 2024	C5S1	Duos	(Canada) Avivv	NAC	Yes	3rd	$35,000	
FNCS Major 2 – 2024	April 12, 2024	May 12, 2024	C5S2	Duos	(United States) Ajerss	NAC	Yes	13th	$3,750	
FNCS Major 3 – 2024	June 14, 2024	July 28, 2024	C5S3	Duos	(Canada) Avivv	NAC	Yes	7th	$15,000	
2024 FNCS Global Championship	September 7, 2024	September 8, 2024	C5S4	Duos	(Canada) Avivv	Global	N/A	14th	$12,000	
FNCS Major 1 – 2025	January 29, 2025	February 16, 2025	C6S1	Trios	(Canada) Avivv & (Cuba) Threats	NAC	Yes	7th	$6,800	
FNCS Major 2 – 2025	April 9, 2025	April 27, 2025	C6S2	Trios	(Canada) Rapid & (Cuba) Threats	NAC	Yes	6th	$6,800	
FNCS Major 3 – 2025	July 16, 2025	August 3, 2025	C6S3	Trios	(United States) Kraez & (Cuba) Threats	NAC	Yes	7th	$6,800	
2025 FNCS Global Championship	September 6, 2025	September 7, 2025	C6S4	Trios	Failed to qualify through either Major					

Career FNCS statistics
Chapter	Out of	Played	Placements						LAN appearances	Most frequent team mate(s)	Earnings
Chapter	Out of	Played	Wins	Top 2	Top 3	Top 5	Top 10	Grand Finals	LAN appearances	Most frequent team mate(s)	Earnings
1	1	1	0	0	0	0	0	1	—	(United States) clarityG & (United States) Stretch (1 each)	$26,000
2	11	11	2	3	3	6	7	10	—	5 different team mates (2 each)	$223,100
3	4	4	1	2	3	3	3	4	1/1	(Canada) Mero (4)	$151,000
4	4	4	0	1	1	2	2	4	1/1	(Cuba) Threats (3)	$79,500
5	4	4	0	0	1	0	2	4	1/1	(Canada) Avivv (3)	$65,750
6	4	3	0	0	0	0	3	3	0/1	(Cuba) Threats (3)	$24,000
Total	28	27	3	6	8	11	17	26	3/4	(Canada) Mero & (Cuba) Threats (6 each)	$569,350

== See also ==
- List of most-followed Twitch channels
