= Gunnar Optiks =

Company specializing in treated eyewear

GUNNAR Optiks LLC
- Industry: Fashion, manufacturing, retail
- Founded: 2007
- Founder: Joe Croft; Jennifer Michelsen
- Headquarters: Carlsbad, California, U.S.
- Area served: United States
- Products: Specialty eyewear
- Website: gunnar.com

GUNNAR Optiks is a company founded in 2007 that specializes in treated eyewear, marketed as safety glasses that protect eyes from computer vision syndrome. Gunnar eyewear has received considerable attention in technical media reviews, including PCWorld, Lifehacker, Huffington Post, and Gizmodo.

The company makes marketing claims that the eyewear improves contrast and comfort while reducing eye fatigue and visual stress, especially for people who spend many hours staring at digital displays.

A Pacific University research study of 36 participants in 2007 found significant differences in irritation or burning of the eyes, tearing or watery eyes, dry eyes, and tired eyes, which were each improved by Gunnar lenses versus placebo lenses. Still in a follow-up study in 2008, the same team was not able to reproduce the results of the first study, finding no difference in burning of the eyes, tearing or watery eyes with Gunnar Optiks compared to placebo glasses. This study found "[no] scientific evidence for a change in accommodation (focusing), tear volume, or electromyography of the eyelid (squinting and blinking)".

On February 11, 2018, Gunnar Optiks appeared on an episode of the ABC television program Shark Tank.

In March 2025, Gunnar Optiks announced a collaboration with Cody “Clix” Conrod for a new pair of gaming glasses, dubbed “Goggles,” to reduce eye strain during extended Fortnite gaming sessions.
