= Benjyfishy =

British professional esports player (born 2004)

- Fish's YouTube icon

Personal information
- Name: Benjamin David Fish
- Born: 2 April 2004 (age 22); United Kingdom

Current team
- Team: Team Heretics
- Game: Valorant

Career information
- Games: Fortnite Battle Royale; Valorant
- Playing career: 2018–present

Team history
- 2018–2019: Clairvoyance
- 2019–2022: NRG Esports
- 2022–present: Team Heretics

Twitch information
- Channel: benjyfishy
- Years active: 2014–present
- Followers: 4.1 million

YouTube information
- Channel: benjyfishy
- Years active: 2014–present
- Subscribers: 1.7 million
- Views: 209.0 million
- Last updated: 1 September 2026

Benjamin David Fish (born 2 April 2004), known professionally as Benjyfishy, (Note: Some sources shorten his first name to "Benjy", and his username is sometimes stylised as "benjyfishy" or "BenjyFishy") is a British live streamer, YouTuber and professional gamer, formerly playing Fortnite Battle Royale and currently playing Valorant for Team Heretics. Born in the United Kingdom, Fish attended school in Middlesex, England, and was known to be shy around others. At 15, his mother took him out of school in support of his career path.

Fish qualified for the Fortnite World Cup in both solos and duos, where he'd place 25th and 14th, respectively, the latter together with Martin 'MrSavage' Foss Andersen. His Fortnite career lasted between 2018 and 2022, during which he earned over $600,000 in prize money, and was often regarded among the best players in the world, albeit never achieving a Fortnite Champion Series victory.

== Early life ==
Benjamin David Fish was born in the United Kingdom on 2 April 2004 to Anne Fish. Raising Fish, his mother worked three jobs. He attended school in Middlesex, England, and was often shy around others when attending. Fish was into games like Guitar Hero, and his older brother introduced him to video games. He also played outdoor sports, including rugby, cricket, football and tenpin bowling, which came to an end when he was diagnosed with Osgood-Schlatter and Sever's disease, leading him to play more games on his computer.

== Career ==
=== Fortnite Battle Royale: 2018–2022 ===
Fish started his career in March 2018 under the name "benjyfishy" playing the 2017 video game Fortnite Battle Royale. Behind the scenes, his mother managed his career since he started. He has signed to several esports companies over the years, first signing to Clairvoyance in 2018, then NRG Esports in 2019 and finally Loaded in 2020. In 2019, he finished 14th place in the duos division alongside his teammate MrSavage and 25th place in the solos division in the 2019 Fortnite World Cup, leaving with 19 points and $50,000 in the solos division.

During the Fortnite World Cup, Fish, alongside Martin "MrSavage" Foss Andersen, Aydan "Aydan" Conrad, Nate Hill, and Sam "Twizz" Pearson were featured at a press conference where they were interviewed. Fish said in the interview that he started Fortnite as a hobby, slowly got better, and then realised he could go pro when he qualified for the Winter Royale. In December 2019, Fish got a dedicated "Stories from the Battle Bus" on Fortnite's YouTube channel. At 15, his mother, Anne Fish, took him out of school so he could focus on becoming a professional gamer, showing her support for Fish's career choice.

He was also having struggles with sleeping and was falling behind in studies. In September 2021, it was revealed that Fish's mother also plays video games under the name "mamabenjyfishy" and she signed to Galaxy Racer on September 8, 2021. In November 2021, Fish's parents, along with MrSavage's parents, launched Fortnite esports guide and biography books titled "Let’s Go! benjyfishy’s Fortnite Journey" and "Build It Like benjyfishy & MrSavage". When MrSavage got his icon skin in September 2025, Fish was featured on one of his cosmetics as a fish keyring.

=== Valorant: 2022–present ===
In June 2022, he retired from Fortnite to switch to Valorant and stated that he "fell out of love" for the game in its third chapter. He signed to Team Heretics in July 2023 and went on to win the VCT EMEA 2026. In May 2024, he competed in the Valorant Masters Madrid 2024; his team, Team Heretics, went up against Sentinels but lost, and his team ended up placing 8th and won $10,000. Fish, alongside his team, was invited by Red Bull to compete in the Red Bull Home Ground tournament in November 2024; his team finished in 6th place during the main event. In 2026, Fish announced he extended his contract with Team Heretics until the end of 2026.

== Other ventures ==
Fish competed in the 2021 PogChamps chess tournament hosted by Chess.com; he made it to the PogChamps 3 Group Stage, although he was beaten out by actor Rainn Wilson and finished with three total points.

== Personal life ==
In 2019, Fish revealed he was homeschooled, although due to his age, he no longer is.

== Awards and nominations ==
| Year | Ceremony | Award | Result | Ref |
|---|---|---|---|---|
| 2020 | Esports Awards | Esports PC Player Of The Year | Nominated | |
| 2023 | VALORANT EMEA Awards | Challengers Rising Stars | Won | |

== See also ==
- List of esports players
