= Kyle Kaplan =

American actor (born 1990)

- Born: Kyle Joseph Kaplan; 16 July 1990 (age 36)
- Occupation: Actor
- Years active: 2005–present

Kyle Joseph Kaplan (born 16 July 1990) is an American actor.

== Life and career ==
At the age of 13, Kaplan toured with Jim Henson's Bear in the Big Blue House Live! across the U.S. and United Kingdom for ten months. He also performed at the Los Angeles Stage Ovation Awards in 2004. He is a member of a comedy improvisation troupe in Los Angeles. Early in his career, he was the subject of a German filmmaker's documentary called "Hollywood Kids".

He has appeared in several national commercials, including Wendy's restaurants, Yahoo!, Cingular Wireless, Simon Malls, Dairy Queen, and most recently, Honda. He can be seen in a recurring role as Chad the Chomper in Disney's Hannah Montana. In 2006, he also appeared in The Bernie Mac Show, CSI: Miami, and Zoey 101.

Kaplan recurred on the Fox sitcom The War at Home, and made guest appearances on the Fox sitcom The Winner, The Riches for the FX network. He appeared in the Owen Wilson comedy Drillbit Taylor, and was cast in a leading role in Just Peck, a feature film which premiered at the Cannes Film Festival in 2009, in which he plays the best friend of the title character, played by Keir Gilchrist.

Kaplan appears as Michael in the ABC Family sitcom 10 Things I Hate About You, based loosely on the 1999 film of the same name, which premiered July 7, 2009.

== Music career ==
Since 2013, Kaplan has been a part of the music duo Phantoms alongside Vinnie Pergola. Their eponymous debut album was released in March 2017.

== Filmography ==
- The Problem Solverz (2011) (TV series) as voice of Horace
- 10 Things I Hate About You (2009) (TV series) as Michael Bernstein (2009, 8 episodes)
- Just Peck (2009) as Geiger
- The Oaks (TV series) as Brian (2008, 1 episode)
- Drillbit Taylor (2008) as Teen Blogger
- The Riches (TV series) as Jared (2008, 1 episode)
- The Final Season (2007) ADR
- The War at Home (TV series) as Monte (2006–2007, 3 episodes)
- The Winner (TV series) as Murray (2007, 1 episode)
- Tim Stack's Family Vacation (TV series) as Kyle (2006, 1 episode)
- You've Reached the Elliott's (TV series) as Brendan (2006, 1 episode)
- Hannah Montana (TV series) as Chad the Chomper (2006, 2 episodes)
- Zoey 101 (TV series) as Andrew (2006, 1 episode)
- CSI: Miami (TV series) as young Brett Flanders (2006, 1 episode)
- The Bernie Mac Show (TV series) as David (2006, 1 episode)
- Grand Union (TV series) as Wayne (2005, 1 episode)
