= Vinnie Pergola =

American actor (born 1989)

- Born: December 9, 1989 (age 36); Tarzana, California, U.S.
- Occupations: Actor, musician, DJ
- Years active: 2004–present

Vinnie Pergola (born December 9, 1989) is an American actor. Credits to date include That's So Raven, Huff, Complete Savages, The Bernie Mac Show, Still Standing, and Miss Behave.

== Music career ==
Since 2013, Pergola has been one half of the electronic music duo Phantoms, the other half being Kyle Kaplan. Their self titled debut album was released in March 2017.

Phantoms are best known for their collab with Vanessa Hudgens for the song Lay With Me released in 2018. Vinnie's band has also released songs such as, but not limited to, Just A Feeling, Broken Halo, Won't Be Here Forever, and Are You Up. Phantoms released their second album, Designs For You in the summer of 2019.
