= MrSavage =

Norwegian esports player (born 2004)

Martin Foss Andersen (born 2004), known as MrSavage, is a Norwegian esports player. He is a professional Fortnite player and qualified to both solos and duos with his teammate Benjyfishy at the 2019 Fortnite World Cup. Andersen has been associated with esports organisations 100 Thieves, NRG Esports, and Red Bull. His career earnings exceed $500,000.

== Career ==
In July 2018, Andersen won the EU Solo Showdown. He got the fourth most points globally.

Andersen finished 29th in solos and 14th in duos at the 2019 Fortnite World Cup, and earned $100,000 in total.

On February 23, 2020, Andersen won the Fortnite tournament at Dreamhack Anaheim in California.
