= Milly Rock =

2014 song by 2 Milly

Single by 2 Milly

from the album Welcome to Millyville
- Released: August 15, 2015
- Genre: Trap
- Length: 3:39
- Label: eOne
- Songwriter: 2 Milly
- Producer: JudoBeatz

2 Milly singles chronology
"Milly Rock" (2015)	"Sleepin" (2016)

External videos
- Original viral video released in 2014

"Milly Rock" is a song by American rapper 2 Milly. Originally published in a YouTube video on August 31, 2014, the song and its associated dance went viral, leading to its release as a single on August 15, 2015, through eOne. 2 Milly filed a lawsuit against Epic Games in 2018, after they added the dance to their video game Fortnite without his permission. He later dropped the lawsuit.

== Background ==
2 Milly (real name Terrence Ferguson), a native of Bed-Stuy in Brooklyn, had been rapping with his friends since he was 13, forming the Stack Paper collective with them. The group claims that their original name, Skull Gang, was stolen by Juelz Santana for his own collective in 2007. 2 Milly's own stage name is short for "Too Militant."

2 Milly created the dance in 2011, originally using it when dancing to other people's songs or his own songs. He decided that he needed a separate song for it after seeing its viral potential after performing it on top of a car at a neighborhood block party for the 25th anniversary of the film Do the Right Thing, which was recorded by many people and blew up on Facebook. He also wanted a way to get on the radio, so when creating the song, he intentionally swore less than he usually would. 2 Milly found the instrumental of the song, which was produced by JudoBeatz, after searching for it on YouTube.

== Composition ==
The song's instrumental is piano-based, with a heavy bass. 2 Milly repeats the lyrics "I Milly Rock on any block" throughout the song, with many of the verses being written about his daily life in New York City.

The Milly Rock dance is a two-step; its lyrics instruct, "First arms up, then left and right (ha) / Then MJ get out my sight (get out my sight)." Vice said that one of the reasons that the dance became so popular was that it allowed for much creativity and improvisation.

== Virality and legacy ==
In the summer of 2015, the song's dance began to go viral online, with celebrities such as Rihanna performing it. Many footballer players also utilized it in their celebrations. Travis Scott brought out 2 Milly and his Stack Paper collective at that year's Summer Jam. In January 2016, ASAP Ferg and Rick Ross released a remix of the song.

The dance gained a resurgence in popularity in 2017 after being mentioned in the song "Magnolia" by Playboi Carti. 2 Milly released a freestyle over the song and announced a forthcoming EP.

=== Lawsuit against Epic Games ===
In November 2018, the Milly Rock dance, renamed to "Swipe It," was added to the video game Fortnite as a purchasable emote, without 2 Milly's permission. In December, 2 Milly sued Epic Games, Fortnite's publisher because of this, with his attorneys claiming in court documents that Epic "should not be able to profit from Ferguson’s fame and hard work by its intentional misappropriation of Ferguson’s original content or likeness." The Verge noted that the lawsuit was "the first formal legal challenge against the widespread game industry practice of appropriating pop culture, like dance moves and memes, and turning it into virtual items for sale." Other artists such as Chance the Rapper have claimed that Epic is exploiting African-American culture by copying their dances for the sake of making a profit.

Dale Cendali, one of Epic's lawyers, responded with a motion to dismiss the lawsuit in February 2019, writing that the dance had too little steps to be claimed, further saying that the original lawsuit "attempts to impose liability, and thereby chill creative expression, by claiming rights that do not exist under the law. No one can own a dance step." The Supreme Court ruled that 2 Milly would have to copyright the dance with the United States Copyright Office before filing the lawsuit. He eventually dropped the suit after being denied by the USCO twice.

== Charts ==
Chart performance for "Milly Rock"
Chart (2016)	Peak position
US Hot R&B/Hip-Hop Songs (Billboard)	50
