= Fortnite Battle Royale =

2017 video game

- Developer: Epic Games
- Publisher: Epic Games (Note: Retail versions published by Warner Bros. Games)
- Directors: Chris Yu; Ted Timmins
- Composers: Rom Di Prisco; Pinar Toprak; Phill Boucher
- Series: Fortnite
- Engine: Unreal Engine 5
- Platforms: macOS; PlayStation 4; Windows; Xbox One; iOS; Nintendo Switch; Android; Xbox Series X/S; PlayStation 5; Nintendo Switch 2
- Release: September 26, 2017: macOS, PlayStation 4, Windows, Xbox One; September 26, 2017; iOS; April 2, 2018; Nintendo Switch; June 12, 2018; Android; August 9, 2018; Xbox Series X/S; November 10, 2020; PlayStation 5; November 12, 2020; Nintendo Switch 2; June 5, 2025
- Genres: Third-person shooter, battle royale
- Mode: Multiplayer

Fortnite Battle Royale is a 2017 battle royale video game produced by Epic Games. Part of the overall Fortnite platform, the game follows up to 100 players competing to be the last player or team remaining. Matches begin with players descending onto a large island, where they gather weapons, items, and resources from scattered locations while attempting to avoid damage from other players and a continuously shrinking safe zone. A building system allows players to use gathered resources—wood, stone, and metal—to create structures that can be used for movement, defense, or combat. The game is played from a third-person perspective, with the camera positioned behind the player character's shoulder.

The game features a live background narrative divided into chapters and seasons, each bringing changes to the island, gameplay, and cosmetic content. Players may purchase an in-game currency, V-Bucks, through the in-game Item Shop, to buy cosmetic items such as outfits and emotes. A seasonal "Battle Pass", also purchased with V-Bucks, features tiers—levels that players unlock by earning XP through gameplay, each rewarding their own cosmetic item. New modes have been introduced since launch, including Zero Build, which removes building mechanics, as well as ranked gameplay and other special formats with different rulesets. Some modes and updates are tied to promotional collaborations with film, television, and music properties.

Development began in mid-2017, following the popularity of PlayerUnknown's Battlegrounds. Built using assets from Fortnite: Save the World, the mode was originally planned as part of the paid version of Fortnite, but was released separately as a free title. Epic Games launched the mode after two months of development, later assigning a dedicated team to support its rapid growth. The game expanded to additional platforms, including consoles and mobile devices, and later introduced cross-platform play and moved to a newer version of Unreal Engine.

Fortnite Battle Royale has received widespread attention and commercial success, with hundreds of millions of registered players and significant revenue across multiple platforms. Critics praised the building mechanics, accessibility, frequent content updates, and cross-platform functionality, while having concerns about its monetization system and learning curve. The game has had a broad cultural reach, appearing in live events such as esports and licensed media, and has been involved in disputes related to copyright, platform policies, consumer protection, and digital privacy.

== Gameplay ==
A player wielding an Assault Rifle shooting into the distance toward a large lake

The core gameplay of Fortnite Battle Royale follows the standard structure of the battle royale genre, played from a third-person perspective. Matches typically consist of up to 100 players, either competing individually or in squads of two, three, or four. (Note: Originally, there was no option for a "trios" mode. However, it was added in December 2018. It was removed in May 2023, when the option for Ranked modes was added, but the mode added back two weeks later in non-Ranked games.) Each round begins with players skydiving from a flying "Battle Bus" and landing on the island map. The island features a fixed layout with various named landmarks and points of interest. These locations contain randomly scattered chests that hold weapons, shields, and other combat resources. Only five items at a time can be stored in the inventory. Weapons are divided into rarities that dictate how much damage they inflict: Common, Uncommon, Rare, Epic, Legendary, Mythic, and Exotic.

The primary objective is to be the last player or team remaining, achieved by either eliminating opponents or avoiding them. In solo play, players are immediately eliminated once their health is fully depleted, but in squad modes, they become incapacitated and may be revived by teammates. Originally, eliminated players were removed from the match entirely, but an update in April 2019 introduced "Reboot Vans" that allow teammates to revive a fallen player. These vans are scarce and typically placed in exposed locations, making the act of reviving a teammate a risk. Throughout the match, the playable area of the island, represented by the eye of a storm, gradually shrinks, and players outside the safe zone take increasing damage over time. This directs the surviving players into tighter spaces, forcing player encounters. Hostile non-player characters (NPCs), introduced in February 2020, can be defeated for additional or improved loot, while friendly NPCs, added in December 2020, offer services such as selling items, healing players, or temporarily joining the player as AI-controlled allies.

A player editing a wall structure. The three cells in the top row of the wall's 3×3 grid are deselected, meaning they would not appear in the final build.

Fortnite Battle Royale's main distinction from other battle royale games is the building system. Using the pickaxe, the only item given at the start of each game, nearly every object in the environment can be destroyed and harvested for materials—wood, stone, and metal—which players use to construct temporary structures like walls, ramps, floors, and roofs. These structures can serve to navigate the terrain, block incoming fire, or hinder enemy movement. Lighter materials allow for quick builds but are easily destroyed, while stronger materials are more durable but slower to place.

Fortnite Battle Royale is free-to-play and monetized via microtransactions, allowing players to purchase "V-Bucks," a shared currency also usable in another Fortnite gamemode, Save the World. Players can earn V-Bucks in Save the World by completing missions and daily objectives, then spend them in Battle Royale on cosmetic upgrades—such as outfits, gliders (items from which player characters hang when descending onto the island), emotes (discrete dance moves), backpacks, and pickaxes—in the Item Shop, which features a daily rotation of purchasable cosmetics. The game is structured into chapters, each containing several seasons that typically last ten weeks. Every season introduces a new set of cosmetic items available through a "Battle Pass", which players progress through by gaining experience via gameplay or completing different challenges. A selection of rewards is free, but purchasing the full Battle Pass with V-Bucks grants access to all tiered rewards, and players can also spend V-Bucks to skip tiers. In December 2020, Epic launched the "Fortnite Crew" subscription, providing members with the latest Battle Pass, a monthly V-Bucks stipend, and exclusive cosmetic content.

Epic Games has continuously added new features to Fortnite Battle Royale, including weapons, vehicles, and items. The company can deploy spontaneous software updates called hotfixes to quickly adjust gameplay elements such as weapon stats and item spawn rates. Items may also be cycled out of the game in a process known as "vaulting" if they are unbalanced or unpopular. In December 2018, Epic simultaneously launched Fortnite Creative, a mode allowing players to create anything they wanted, and "The Block", a rotating showcase of community-made creations added to the Battle Royale island. One year later, Epic released the "Battle Lab" mode, which allowed players to design custom battle royale experiences, but this was removed due to the expanded capabilities of Creative mode. In April 2020, Epic introduced "Party Royale," a separate, combat-free map designed for social interaction and live events, where players can use non-lethal items such as paint guns and vehicles. Before September 2019, matchmaking was primarily determined by platform and region, but an update introduced skill-based matchmaking, using internal metrics to evaluate player performance and match them with similarly skilled players. Epic also added AI-controlled bots into regular matches, allowing new or less experienced players to practice mechanics and strategies more comfortably.

=== Special modes ===
Epic Games has introduced several distinct game modes to Fortnite since 2022.

- "Zero Build" was introduced in March 2022. This mode removed the traditional building mechanics and added an "overshield" feature, giving an additional regenerating set of HP. Initially replacing standard Battle Royale during the first week of Chapter 3 Season 2, Zero Build became a permanent standalone option in April 2022. Epic later added the "Zero Builds Trials"—a series of objectives in the "Zero Build" mode that awarded cosmetics upon completion—in April 2022.
- A "Ranked" mode was introduced for both standard and Zero Build gameplay across all team sizes in May 2023, adjusting matchmaking based on player performance. Ranked mode was eventually extended to newer game types.
- "Fortnite Reload" launched in June 2024, featuring a map rotation of smaller islands, with 40-player matches, limited weapon selection, and automatic revival upon death (respawning) except in the final moments. It supports one to four-person, Zero Build, and Ranked gameplay.
- "Fortnite OG" debuted in December 2024, bringing back the original Chapter 1 map with rotating seasonal changes and mostly legacy mechanics and items.
- "Blitz Royale" was released in June 2025, where 32 players fight on a smaller map with the playable area shrinking rapidly. Every player starts with the same items and can often find more "mythic" and "exotic" tiered weapons as their rank increases.

Beyond permanent modes, Epic has experimented with limited-time modes (LTMs). One of the earliest was 50v50, which divided players into two large teams on opposite sides of the island, giving them time to gather resources and build defenses before the storm forced confrontation. In June 2018, Epic released the Playground LTM, a sandbox mode for up to four players, allowing them to freely manipulate the island and fight with the ability to respawn. Eventually, Epic declared it permanent, but it was replaced by Battle Lab in 2019 when Playground moved to Creative. A preliminary competitive mode, Solo Showdown, ran briefly starting in May 2018, ranking players by final placement and rewarding top competitors with V-Bucks. In 2025, Fortnite Delulu was introduced as an LTM featuring up to 80 players and a proximity chat system—where players can speak to each other through voice chat based on how close they are to each other—allowing solo-queued players to organically team up mid-match, though only four players could win. Crown Jam, a collaboration with Fall Guys featuring 3v3 basketball-inspired matches between players controlling Fall Guys avatars, was introduced on January 23, 2026, and concluded on February 9.

=== Narrative, seasonal changes and promotional events ===
When initially released and through the first few seasons, there was no arching narrative to Fortnite Battle Royale; the island map changed with seasons but without explanation. A firmer narrative started with the transition from third to fourth season in Chapter 1. Leading to the end of season three, players saw a number of shooting stars cross the skies, followed by a giant comet that neared the ground; upon the start of that season, the comet had hit one of the locations on the island, leaving a giant crater, among other changes. This coincided with the introduction of superhero- and supervillain-themed cosmetic items. More recent seasons have used custom created global events that occur across all Battle Royale series at the same, either as a story event, or season or chapter-ending event that explains significant map changes in the following season. The first such event involved a countdown culminating in the launch of a rocket in June 2018. The aftermath of this event created cracks in the sky, which eventually expanded into a "rift" that served as the narrative basis for Chapter 1, Season 5.

Since then, Epic has developed a narrative that an object called the Zero Point connects to many universes, allowing people and objects from these to fall through onto the battle royale island. The Zero Point also powers a 20-some minute time loop that resets the island and all those on it back to their original state on each loop, including those that may have died. A group called The Seven fight to protect the Zero Point and its time loop from attack by another group called the Imagined Order who seek to destroy the Zero Point, which the Seven fear will destroy all the connected universes. The Seven, through their agents Jones and Hope, instruct the combatants to fight the Imagined Order and their allies, with the promise that being the last one alive in each loop has the opportunity to allow them to escape the time loop.

The Zero Point narrative has allowed Epic to introduce other licensed intellectual property as canon elements within the game, often tied to real world promotions. Shortly after the release of the film Avengers: Infinity War (2018), Epic ran a Marvel Comics–sponsored event that featured the Infinity Gauntlet—a glove wielded by Thanos, the main villain in the Marvel Cinematic Universe—which randomly spawned on the island and which allowed any player who equipped it to become Thanos and wield specific abilities. A second Avengers-based mode was released upon the release of Avengers: Endgame (2019), where players are randomly split between Avenger and Chitauri armies, seeking out the Infinity Stones or the Infinity Gauntlet. Since then, Fortnite Battle Royale has periodically included limited-time promotional content from various entertainment properties, typically timed to coincide with media premieres. These properties have included John Wick, Stranger Things, Star Wars, and Family Guy, among others. In 2026, Epic also partnered with Focus Features to promote the historical drama The Uprising, starring Andrew Garfield, through a playable Fortnite experience based on the film's depiction of the Peasants' Revolt of 1381.

Fortnite Battle Royale has also hosted numerous non-gameplay-related promotional events, primarily in the form of virtual concerts, film previews, and branded media showcases. These events began with EDM artist Marshmello's in-game concert in February 2019, which attracted over 10 million players. Subsequent performances have included Metallica, Travis Scott, and Ariana Grande, often drawing millions of live viewers and offering themed cosmetic items. Several of these concerts debuted new songs or leveraged extended reality production, with events like Scott's show "Astronomical" using unique visual effects. These events are typically held within the "Party Royale" mode, with artists like Diplo, Steve Aoki, Deadmau5, and BTS, who premiered a special choreography video for "Dynamite", using the platform.

Additionally, Fortnite Battle Royale has served as a platform for broader media and brand partnerships. Star Wars content debuted in-game alongside a live preview of The Rise of Skywalker, hosted by Geoff Keighley and the movie's director J. J. Abrams, as did a trailer for Christopher Nolan's movie Tenet. Disney used a UEFN (Unreal Editor for Fortnite) experience in 2024 to livestream a segment of its D23 Entertainment Showcase, unveiling Marvel-themed game content and distributing free cosmetics to attendees. Other branded collaborations have included performances or features tied to Karol G, Snoop Dogg, Ice Spice, Eminem, and Juice Wrld. Epic also started a weekly Fortnite Spotlight in-game concert event series in September 2020 using "Party Royale", with concerts from various musicians planned for free for any player of Fortnite to watch. According to Nate Nanzer, Epic Games head of global partnerships, "[they are] creating this platform to work with artists — big artists and up-and-coming artists."

== Development ==
=== Pre-release ===
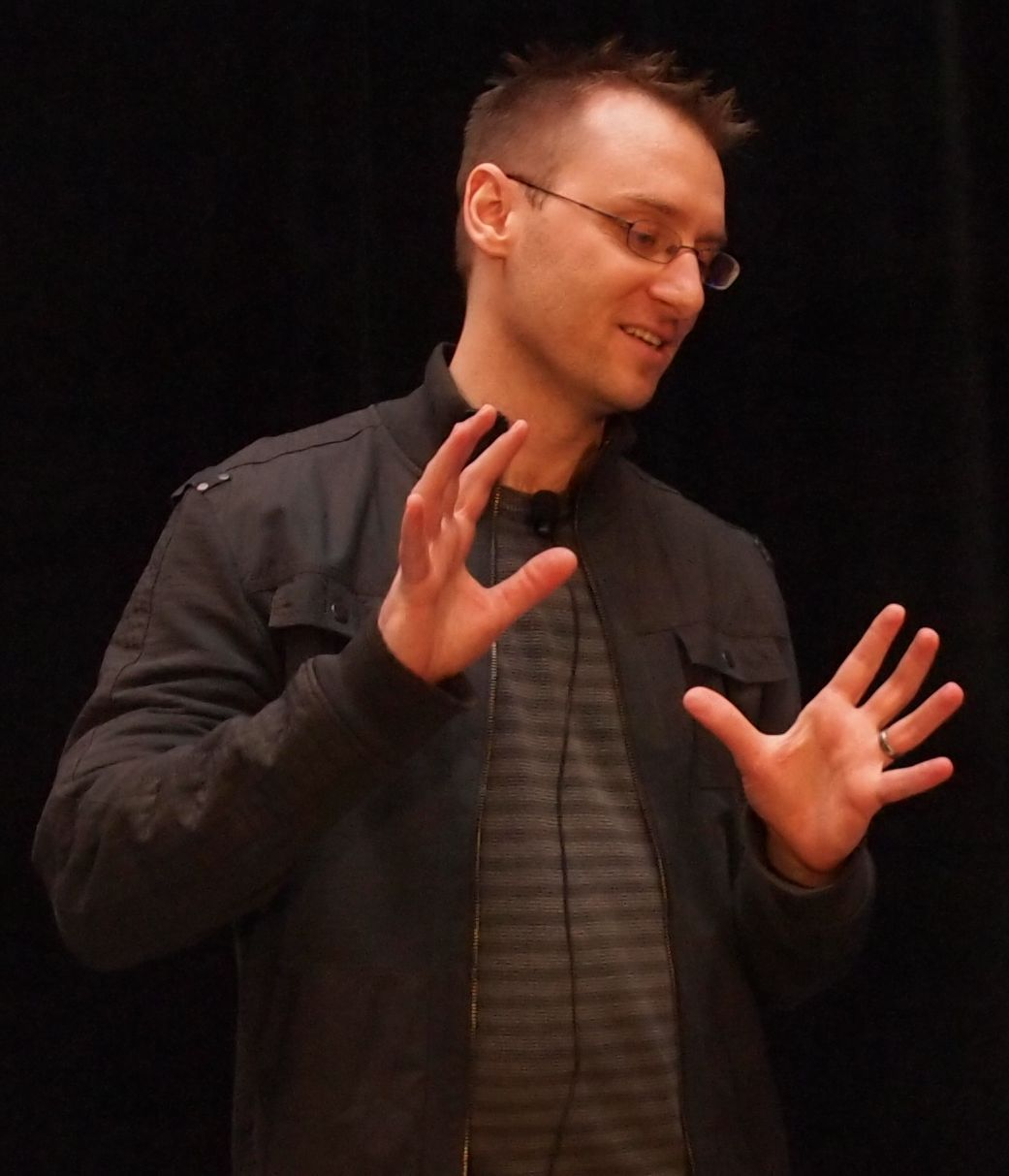
Donald Mustard (pictured in 2011) was one of the key figures at Epic during the development of Fortnite Battle Royale.

Fortnite had first been announced by Epic Games in 2011, considered to be a combination of Minecraft and Left 4 Dead, with four players cooperating to scavenge resources and build fortifications, traps, weapons, and other objects to survive attacks from monsters. The game experienced a prolonged development period due to external industry pressures, including a shift toward a games-as-a-service model, and internal changes within Epic, such as a shift in focus to their first free-to-play title, Paragon. During this time, Epic reached an agreement with Tencent, granting the company approximately 40% ownership in exchange for support in transitioning to a games-as-a-service model and access to the Chinese video game market. In June 2017, Epic confirmed that Fortnite was planned for release in 2018, with a paid early access period starting one month later. The game was otherwise intended to be a free-to-play title supported by microtransactions. Upon entering early access, the game featured its primary gameplay mode, "Save the World", in which teams of up to four players worked cooperatively to survive and complete objectives on procedurally generated maps.

During the later parts of Fortnite's development, PlayerUnknown's Battlegrounds was released in early access on personal computers in March 2017 and quickly became a popular and successful example of the battle royale genre. In mid-2017, Epic Games' CCO Donald Mustard, CEO Tim Sweeney, and two other executives were traveling by Uber to a meeting with Disney in California to discuss potential opportunities when they decided to create a battle royale mode for Fortnite. During the three-hour ride, Mustard wrote a one-page design document that they intended to present to Disney; the idea for the Battle Bus came from seeing a school bus during the ride. According to Mustard, the Epic team "loved Battle Royale games like [Battlegrounds]", and began exploring how a similar mode could be integrated into Fortnite's engine. Development of the mode was kept separate from the main player-versus-environment content to allow experimentation without affecting game balance.

The development of Fortnite Battle Royale was led by Eric Williamson, with Zack Estep serving as production lead. Their objective was to develop the new mode quickly based on the existing "Save the World" mode, putting off any complex features that weren't already in place as to launch the new mode as soon as possible; while they explored such potential ideas, they held off inclusion until after the main mode was launched. Development began in July 2017, after "Save the World" was released, and lasted about two months, with assistance from the Unreal Tournament team. Battle Royale's differences from "Save the World" included a more limited progression for weapons, a small subset of traps, and a smoother, more natural terrain for the maps. They aimed for matches lasting no longer than 25 minutes, which influenced decisions about which elements from "Save the World" would be excluded. They had included Fortnite Battle Royale's building mechanic for fortifications, unsure how players would use it since the safe zone would continue shrinking, but found quickly that the mechanic helped to distinguish the game from Battlegrounds and was used by expert players frequently to win matches. Epic later added features to help players build temporary bases more easily.

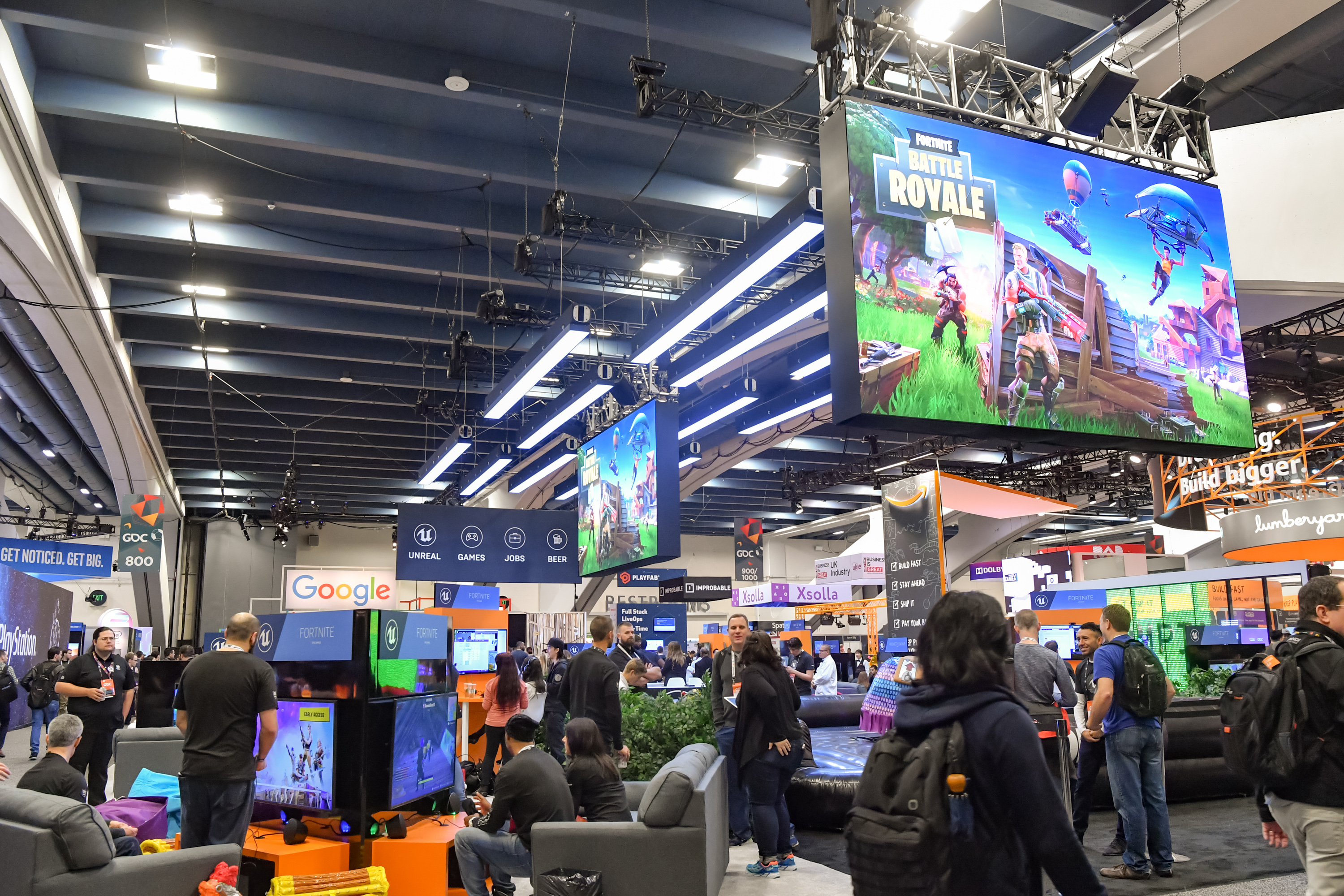
Fortnite Battle Royale at the 2018 Game Developers Conference

In those two months of development, Epic initially planned to include the Battle Royale mode within the paid version of Fortnite and announced this publicly in early September 2017. Two weeks before the mode's release, Epic chose to launch it as a separate free-to-play title, concerned that including it in the paid version would hinder its growth. Epic formally announced this decision about a week after the initial announcement of Battle Royale, offering refunds to those who had purchased early access in anticipation of the new mode. Fortnite Battle Royale was officially released on September 26, 2017 on PC (Windows & Mac), PlayStation 4, and Xbox One. This release, which beat out Battlegrounds to consoles, caused some concern with Battlegrounds developer Bluehole, as they had been working closely with Epic for Unreal Engine support in Battlegrounds, and were worried that Fortnite might be able to include planned features to their Battle Royale mode before they could release them in Battlegrounds.

=== Post-release ===
By early 2018, Fortnite Battle Royale had become popular, and Epic assigned a dedicated development team to focus on improvements for the mode. Due to the substantial player-base and the fact that Fortnite Battle Royale was marketed as a "game-as-a-service" product, the team experienced extensive working hours dedicated to patching, receiving over 3,000 tickets every day, up from 20–40 before the game's growth. Additionally, Epic acknowledged that its focus on Fortnite had resulted in decreased player activity in some of its other games, leading to reduced development for those titles, particularly Paragon. In January 2018, Epic announced that Paragon would be shut down by April of that year and that all players would receive refunds. Similarly, Epic announced it had halted development of the planned free-to-play Unreal Tournament game, transitioning its team to work on Fortnite, although the game would remain available, playable, and open to user modifications. Players on a Fortnite-dedicated Reddit forum had expressed concerns that a similar fate could befall the Save the World mode of Fortnite, as the mode had not received the same level of updates and improvements as Battle Royale since its release.

According to Mustard, from the outset of Fortnite Battle Royale's development, Epic intended to include a narrative, with a long-term story planned by Mustard. However, they recognized that most players were primarily focused on the core mechanics of the game. As a result, they chose to present players as observers of in-game events rather than central characters. The story would be conveyed through non-player characters and other media. The narrative was designed to be adaptable, allowing for responses to player feedback and integration of promotional collaborations, all of which were tied to a multiverse concept that was part of the overarching narrative. The inclusion of narrative elements led the team to develop new methods for storytelling, such as single-time global events and specialized single-player missions. On June 29, 2020, Epic announced that it no longer considered "Save the World" to be in early access and simultaneously removed the early access labels from both Battle Royale and Creative modes. With the launch of Chapter 3 on December 5, 2021, Epic transitioned the game to Unreal Engine 5, the latest iteration of Unreal Engine, a software program that facilitates the development of video games.

=== Localization ===
Tencent, who is a partial owner of Epic Games, brought Fortnite Battle Royale to China in 2018; the company was already involved in supporting Battlegrounds in China as well. Tencent planned to spend up to US$15 million to help promote the game in China, set up esports tournaments, and fight against copyright infringement and clones of Fortnite that have appeared in the country. Epic also worked with Neowiz Games to bring a version of Fortnite to South Korea, launched in November 2018. Tencent announced in October 2021 that the Chinese version of Fortnite, which had never left the beta phase and had a number of functional differences from international versions of the game, would be shutting down on November 15, 2021, disallowing new user registration. This move came after new regulations and restrictions made by the Chinese government towards online gaming.

=== Ports ===
Fortnite Battle Royale was released for the Nintendo Switch on June 12, 2018, following widespread rumors leading up to that year's iteration of E3, a video game trade show. Announced during a Nintendo Direct presentation, the game supported cross-platform play with all systems except PlayStation 4. Using their Epic Games account, players could transfer their inventory, Battle Pass progress, and in-game currency between compatible platforms. It was the first game on the Switch to offer direct voice chat, using software provided by Vivox. After the release, Vivox made its voice chat software development kit available to other developers creating Switch games. Additionally, in March 2018, Epic announced that Fortnite Battle Royale would be developed for Android and iOS mobile devices. The iOS beta version came first, becoming widely available on April 2, 2018, while the Android beta version released on August 9, initially exclusive to select Samsung devices. Invitations to other Android users began on August 13, and by October 11, the Android version became available to all users without an invite.

Initially, Epic did not distribute the Android version through the Google Play Store, instead offering it via a sideloaded installer on its website, or through Samsung's Galaxy Apps store. Epic cited a desire for its microtransactions not to be subject to the Google Play Store's 30% revenue share, which it considered disproportionate to the services provided by the store. Epic wanted an exemption from Google's revenue cut for in-app purchases, a request Google declined. Within a month of launch, at least 32 clones of Fortnite's installer appeared on the Google Play Store, with approximately half containing malware. Epic's installer included warnings to encourage users to re-enable device security settings and to avoid unofficial downloads. A vulnerability in the original installer, discovered by Google, was patched by Epic within 48 hours, and no exploitation was reported. In April 2020, Epic reversed its decision and released Fortnite on Google Play, stating that distributing the game outside the store placed third-party software at a disadvantage due to security warnings and limitations imposed by Google.

According to analysis firm Sensor Tower, the iOS version of Fortnite Battle Royale generated an estimated US$1 million in microtransaction revenue within the first three days after in-app purchases became available. Within one month, the mobile version had generated over US$25 million, surpassing the early performance of several other top-grossing mobile games. In May 2020, in conjunction with the unveiling of Unreal Engine 5, Epic announced that Fortnite would be ported to the PlayStation 5 and Xbox Series X consoles. These versions were planned to be available at the launch of the new consoles in late 2020. Initially, they would run on Unreal Engine 4, with a transition to Unreal Engine 5 expected by mid-2021, following the engine's release. These ports were released on November 10, 2020, and November 12, 2020, respectively. On June 5, 2025, Fortnite was released as a launch game on the Nintendo Switch 2.

==== Cross-platform play ====
For the first five seasons, all ports of Fortnite Battle Royale supported cross-platform play with other versions, but with limited interaction with the PlayStation 4. While Epic Games had expressed interest in having full cross-platform play across all available platforms, Sony's continued refusal to allow cross-play between the PlayStation 4 and other consoles rendered this impossible, according to Microsoft. While players could use a single Epic Games account to share progress in Fortnite Battle Royale on all other platforms, those who used their PlayStation Network credentials to establish their Epic account could not have used that account on other platforms. The account restriction was confirmed to be as a result of Sony's initial decision to prohibit cross-platform play between its PlayStation 4 and other consoles, rather than a choice Epic had made.

By September 2018, Sony announced it would permit cross-platform play on the PlayStation 4 for "select third-party titles," beginning with Fortnite. A beta version of the PlayStation 4 client that supported cross-platform functionality was released on September 26, 2018, the same day as Sony's announcement. Epic released tools in February 2019 to allow users to merge multiple Epic accounts and to unlink console accounts from an Epic account for use with another console. The first full patch adding in cross-platform play support across all consoles was released the next month. Solo mobile players, or squads made up entirely of mobile players, are by default matched only with other mobile players to maintain fairness; however, players can choose to join squads on other platforms using cross-platform play, and matchmaking will take all available matches into account. With the March 2019 update enabling cross-platform play, PlayStation 4 and Xbox One players were then matched with each other by default, to avoid placing them at a disadvantage against computer users.

== Promotion and cross-media expansion ==
=== Promotion and marketing ===
In May 2018, Epic announced a partnership with the sports apparel manufacturing company IMG to produce official Fortnite-themed clothing. A Hasbro-licensed Fortnite Battle Royale-themed version of Monopoly was announced for release by late 2018; the Fortnite Monopoly game includes elements from the video game, such as replacing money with players' lives and allowing properties to be protected using walls. As part of the same agreement, Hasbro also produced Fortnite-based Nerf blasters, toy guns that became available in retail stores in 2019. Funko released a series of Fortnite Battle Royale-themed Pop! figurines in late 2018. Fortnite Battle Royale has been included in special bundles for both the Xbox One and Nintendo Switch, with each version offering redeemable codes for V-Bucks and customization options exclusive to that platform. A retail release of Fortnite Battle Royale, called Fortnite: Deep Freeze Bundle, was distributed by Warner Bros. Interactive Entertainment for the PlayStation 4, Xbox One, and Nintendo Switch in late 2018. The package included a redeemable code for V-Bucks and unique in-game cosmetics.

In October 2018, Epic introduced the "Support a Creator" program for Fortnite. Players could choose one of several popular Fortnite livestreamers—players who broadcast their gameplay to an audience in real time—selected through an application process managed by Epic, to support via the in-game client. These creators earned money based on how many V-Bucks their supporters spent, at a rate of US$5 for every 10,000 V-Bucks spent (equivalent to approximately 5% of the total value). Though the initiative was initially planned as a limited-time event, by December 2018 Epic reported that millions of players had used the feature to support more than 10,000 creators. As a result, Epic made the program a permanent option for Fortnite, with the intention of helping some creators transition to full-time content creation, and plans to extend this program to other games offered via the Epic Games Store, including Tom Clancy's The Division 2. In November 2018, Epic partnered with the National Football League (NFL) to release character outfits for each of the league's 32 teams, along with original "Fortnite Team" outfits, which were available for a limited time. This collaboration was influenced by the popularity of Fortnite among NFL players, many of whom had performed Fortnite dance emotes as touchdown celebrations.

=== Esports ===
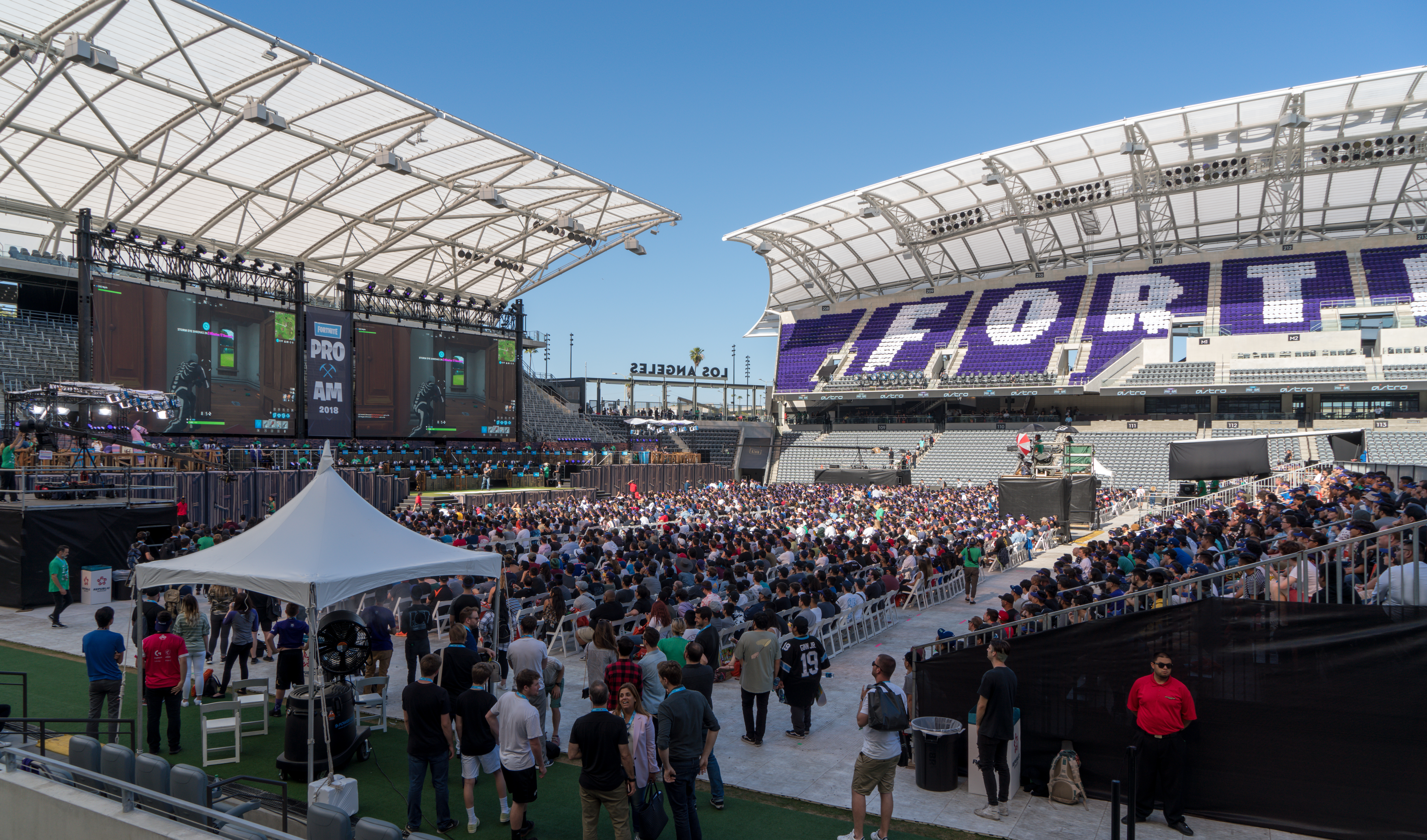
The Fortnite Pro-Am event at E3 2018

One of the first professional esports events for Fortnite was the Fortnite Pro-Am, held on June 12, 2018, during E3 2018, with 3,000 attendees. The tournament was announced following the success of the streamer Ninja's March 2018 stream featuring celebrities such as Drake. The event paired 50 celebrities with 50 top streamers to compete for a US$3 million, with winnings donated to the teams' chosen charities. Ninja and his celebrity teammate Marshmello won this event. Additional Pro-Am events were held at E3 2019 in June 2019 and the Galen Center at the University of Southern California in May 2025.

In May 2018, Epic announced it would allocate US$100 million to fund Fortnite Battle Royale tournaments throughout the year to support its development as an esport. The Fortnite World Cup was announced in February 2019, with qualifying rounds from April through June and finals held at Arthur Ashe Stadium in New York City from July 26–28, 2019. The total prize pool was US$30 million, including US$3 million each for the winners of the solo and duo competitions.

In mid-2018, Epic launched the Summer Skirmish series, an eight-week tournament with different formats each week and a total prize pool of US$8 million. The series experienced early issues; the first week was cut short due to server problems, and the second week ended amid accusations of cheating, which Epic later confirmed were unfounded. Epic followed with the Fall Skirmish series, starting on September 21, 2018, offering up to US$10 million in prizes. Beginning with Season X in August 2019, Epic introduced the Fortnite Champion Series, with various competitive formats, such as three-player squads in the first series, along with weekly qualifiers and final tournaments held across multiple geographic regions. Through PlayVS, Epic started sponsoring high school and college-level Fortnite tournaments in the United States in 2020.

=== Comics ===
Epic Games and DC Comics partnered on a six-issue crossover comic series, Batman/Fortnite: Zero Point, which began distribution in April 2021. Written by Christos Gage in collaboration with Epic's Donald Mustard, each issue included a code to unlock in-game items in Fortnite Battle Royale. Players who purchased all six issues or the collected hardcover edition received a code for a Batman outfit. The series received a sequel in October 2021, Batman/Fortnite: Foundation, a standalone comic that also included a redeemable code for a The Batman Who Laughs outfit.

== Reception and legacy ==
Reception

Aggregate score
Aggregator	Score
Metacritic	PC: 81/100; PS4: 78/100; XONE: 85/100 iOS: 81/100; NS: 83/100; NS2: 84/100

Review scores
Publication	Score
Digital Trends	4/5 (Note: Originally rated 3/5 in March 2018, but later re-rated 4/5 in April 2023.)
Game Informer	9.5/10
GameRevolution	3.5/5
GameSpot	8/10
GamesRadar+	4/5
IGN	9/10 (Note: Originally rated 9.6/10 in March 2018, but re-rated to 9/10 in September 2024.)
Jeuxvideo.com	16/20; 16/20 (iOS)
Nintendo Life	8/10 (NS); 8/10 (NS2)

=== Critical reception ===
Fortnite Battle Royale received generally positive reviews from critics. Daniel Tack of Game Informer called it "immediately understandable" and praised its replayability, stating that the unpredictable nature of each match gave the game a lasting appeal. Michael Higham of GameSpot observed that its lighthearted presentation and building tools made for a "uniquely chaotic" experience, though he noted the gameplay relied more on improvisation than precision. Austen Goslin of IGN described Fortnite Battle Royale as "a chaotic and fun system" and remarked that its speed and simplicity helped distinguish it from other battle royale games.

The building system drew both praise and criticism. Higham argued that it "always gives you the opportunity to improvise," enabling players to create cover or elevation mid-fight, and Goslin wrote that "Fortnite is more about building than it is about shooting." Dave Aubrey of Pocket Gamer pointed out that the constantly shrinking play area often made permanent structures impractical, saying "settling down and building a nice fort… isn't really practical." While Gavin Lane of Nintendo Life admired the flexibility of construction, he argued that the interface was difficult to grasp for new players, and the lack of tutorials could make early matches confusing.

Critics had differing views on map design and pacing. Higham described the island as lacking "sophistication in physical layouts," saying that loot placement could feel uneven between locations. Goslin appreciated the distinct visual identity of the named locations, and felt that even with a single map, variation emerged through player behavior. Ford James of GamesRadar+ emphasized how often Fortnite's structure and meta changed, pointing out that "nothing stays the same… weapons come and go, items are vaulted, and tactics shift month to month." Opinions were also mixed on the game's free-to-play model. While Goslin called the Battle Pass "a neat structure" that rewarded consistent play, James expressed concern about social pressure, especially among younger players, arguing that "if kids don't spend real money… they'll be ridiculed." daFrans of Jeuxvideo.com criticized the price of premium skins, stating that "for the most expensive outfits, we still exceed €20". Most reviewers agreed that monetization was cosmetic-only, but not all felt it was unobtrusive.

The technical performance across platforms was generally seen as stable, with caveats. On the Nintendo Switch, Aubrey and Tommaso Pugliese from Multiplayer.it found that the game "runs relatively well" at 30 frames per second, despite reduced graphical fidelity. Lane described the absence of motion-assisted aiming and found the handheld experience limited by resolution and input precision, but concluded that "performance is perfectly acceptable." Across platforms, critics emphasized that Fortnite's mechanics remained functional and recognizable, even when visual quality varied.

=== Player count and revenue ===
Fortnite Battle Royale attracted non-traditional video game players, drawing comparisons by analysts to World of Warcraft and Minecraft. It gained over 10 million players within two weeks of release. By March 2018, the player base exceeded 45 million, and three months later, in June 2018, Epic Games reported over 125 million players, with 40 million active monthly. By November, Fortnite Battle Royale had over 200 million registered accounts. At the 2019 Game Developers Conference, Tim Sweeney announced 250 million players, with 35% female, the highest known percentage for a shooter game. By May 2020, registered players exceeded 350 million. By the end of 2020, total revenue from Fortnite, including Battle Royale surpassed $9 billion.

Platform-specific launches generated immediate user increases, with the Nintendo Switch version receiving over 2 million downloads within one day. The Android version reached over 15 million downloads in three weeks. During the release of Season 5 in July 2018, Akamai Technologies recorded traffic nearing 37 terabytes per second, the highest for any video game they had observed. Nintendo reported in its quarterly earnings for September 30, 2018, that Fortnite had been downloaded on approximately half of all sold Switch consoles, totaling about 11.5 million downloads. In November 2018, Fortnite became available in South Korea's PC bangs (internet cafes). Shortly thereafter, Epic reported a peak concurrent player count of 8.3 million, surpassing the previous record of 3.4 million in February 2018. In February 2018, analysis firm SuperData estimated Fortnite Battle Royale earned over $126 million, exceeding Battlegrounds' $103 million. March revenues surpassed $223 million. By April 2018, Fortnite led Battlegrounds in both revenue and player count across all platforms.

Revenues reached $296 million in April and $318 million in May. By July 2018, cumulative revenue exceeded $1 billion. Sensor Tower estimated that Fortnite on mobile devices generated over $1.2 million daily prior to Season 5 in July 2018, increasing to $2 million daily afterward. SuperData reported Fortnite earned $2.4 billion in 2018, the highest annual revenue for a free-to-play title. In 2019, revenue declined 25% to $1.8 billion due to market stabilization but remained the highest for the year. Epic Games was valued at $825 million in 2012 at the time of Tencent's investment. By May 2018, due to Fortnite Battle Royale, the valuation rose to $4.5 billion. Bloomberg projected an $8.5 billion valuation by the end of 2018 if Fortnite reached $2 billion in annual revenue. Partially due to the influx of revenue from Fortnite Battle Royale, Epic reduced its portion of sales it collected from the Unreal Engine Marketplace from 30% to 12% in July 2018, applying that retroactively to past sales.

=== Impact ===
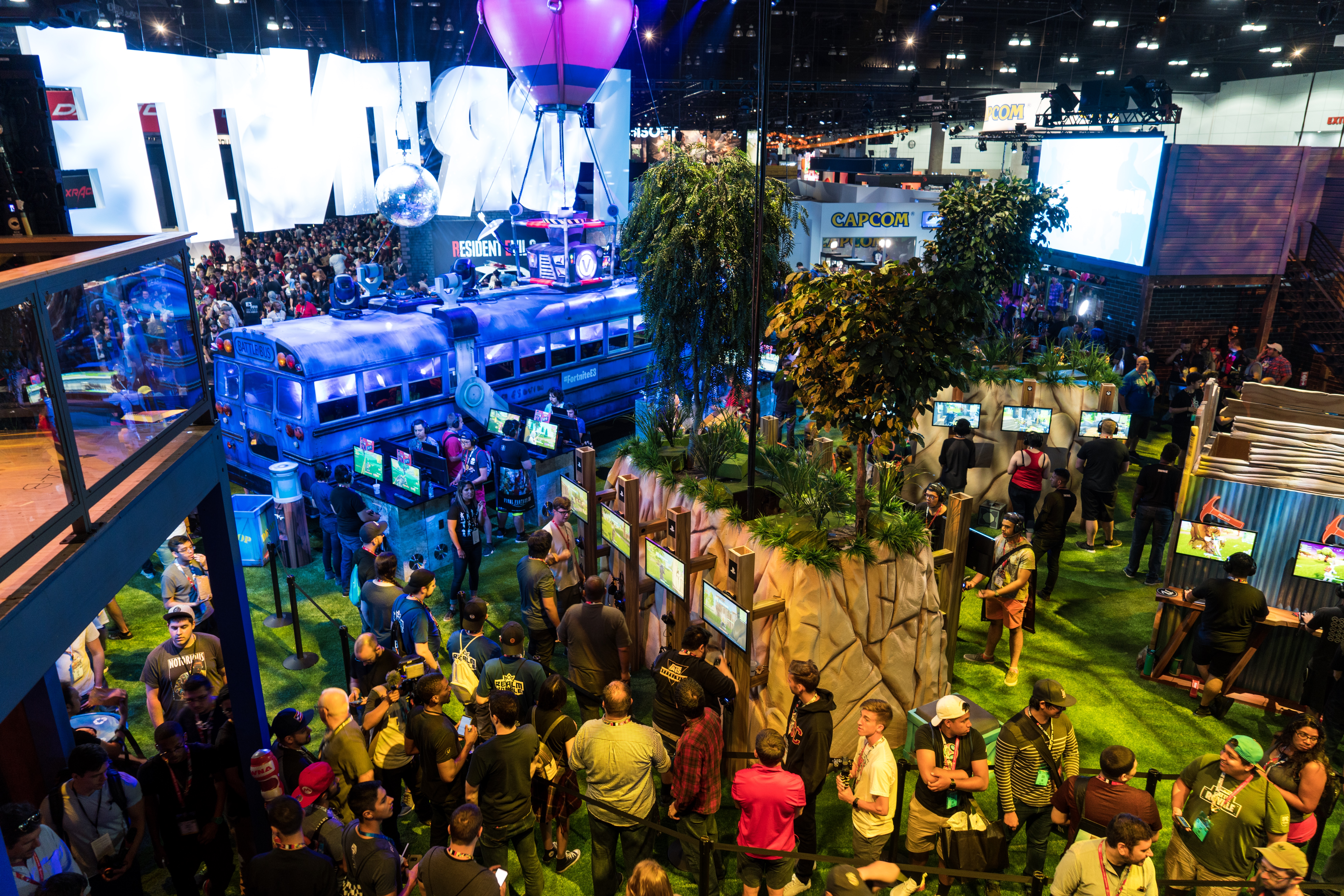
The Fortnite exhibition booth during the Electronic Entertainment Expo 2018

Journalists attributed Fortnite Battle Royale's success over PlayerUnknown's Battlegrounds to several factors. In addition to being free-to-play and available on consoles, Fortnite was released while Battlegrounds was experiencing issues with cheating and a toxic player community. Its less violent, cartoon-like style, similar to Minecraft, also helped attract a younger and more gender-diverse audience. The surge in Fortnite's popularity in March 2018, which drew larger audiences than multiplayer titles like Grand Theft Auto Online and Destiny 2, had financial effects on competitors.

Analysts from Morgan Stanley and KeyBanc Capital Markets reported stock declines for Take-Two Interactive and Activision Blizzard during this period. In May 2018, Activision CEO Bobby Kotick acknowledged Fortnite as significant competition and credited it with attracting new players to gaming, stating that the company was exploring its own battle royale game. Electronic Arts CEO Blake Jorgensen similarly pointed at Fortnite's market impact, saying it was bringing younger players into first-person shooters and benefiting the long-term health of the genre.

Fortnite Battle Royale's success has also been linked to its influence on social media. By March 2018, it became the most-viewed game on Twitch, surpassing League of Legends and Battlegrounds in average concurrent viewers. The streamer Tyler "Ninja" Blevins gained prominence as an early Fortnite figure, attracting a large subscriber base through his gameplay and Twitch promotions offering cosmetic items. By March 2018, he was estimated to be earning $500,000 per month, and by the end of the year had reportedly made nearly $10 million, with over 20 million followers across YouTube and Twitch. In 2019, Time included Blevins in its Time 100 list of the most influential people. To recognize public figures who helped promote Fortnite Battle Royale, Epic introduced the "Icon Series," featuring in-game cosmetics based on real individuals, including Blevins, the musicians Marshmello and Major Lazer, the streamer Loserfruit, and a planned release for David "Grefg" Martínez.

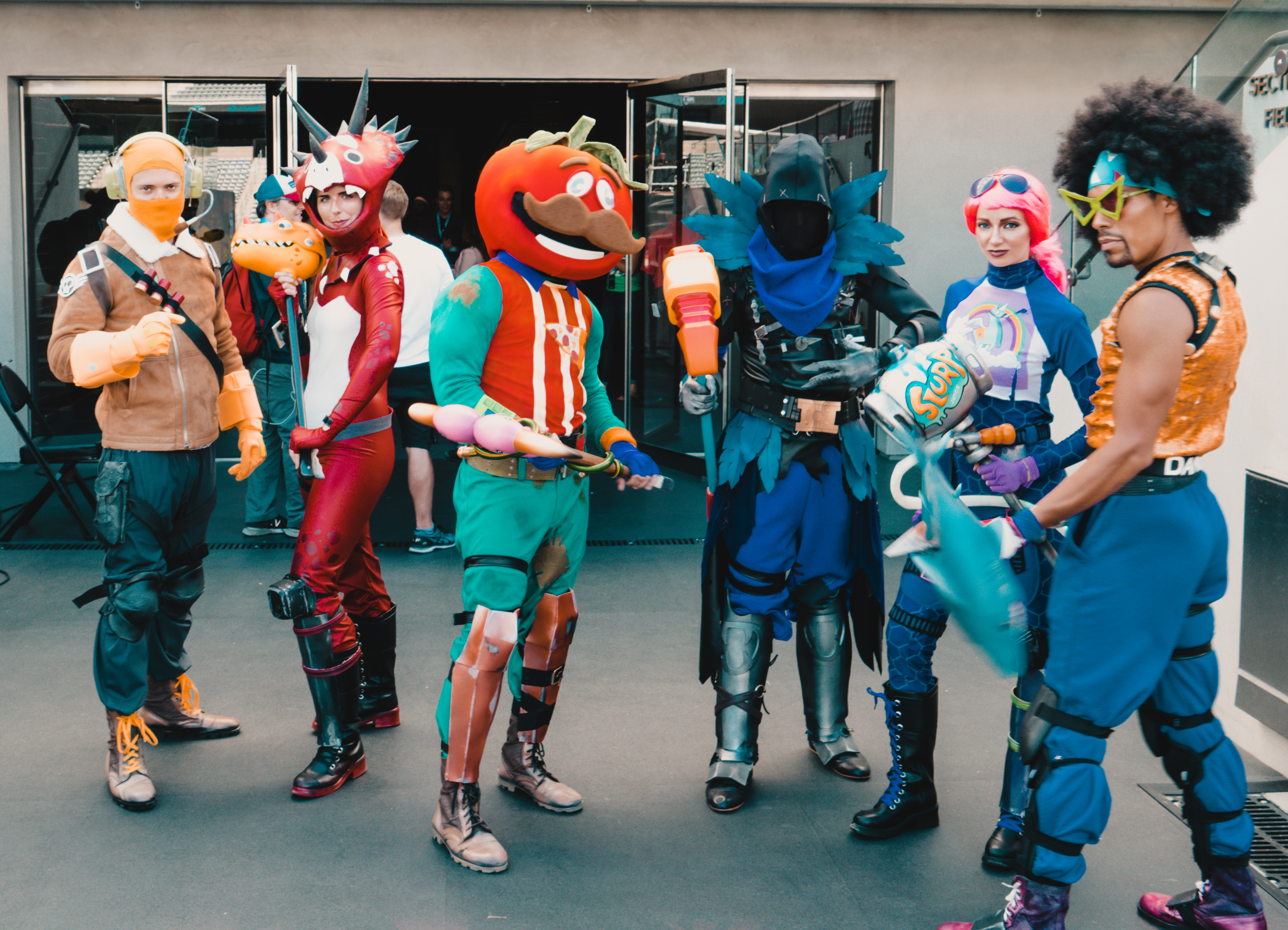
Fortnite cosplayers at E3 2018

A number of celebrities and athletes have publicly stated they play Fortnite, including Chance the Rapper, Joe Jonas, Finn Wolfhard, Roseanne Barr, and Norm Macdonald. The musician Drake played Fortnite Battle Royale with Ninja in 2018, reaching a peak viewership of 638,000 concurrent viewers. Some athletes have even incorporated Fortnite emotes into their on-field celebration dances. These gestures were prominently featured during the 2018 FIFA World Cup, including by Antoine Griezmann after scoring a penalty kick in the final match. Other notable fans include the Russo brothers, directors of Avengers: Infinity War, who played the game during production breaks. Their interest led to the creation of Fortnite's limited-time Thanos mode and their later involvement in directing the Chapter 2 Season 6 cinematic trailer. The visibility of Fortnite among high-profile figures has contributed to its continued popularity and player growth.

=== In popular culture ===
Fortnite Battle Royale has been jokingly referred to as "Fork Knife" on social media, believed to have originated with people, unfamiliar with the game, described their friends and family spending time playing the game. Epic added a harvestable, non-playable "Fork Knife" food truck to the game map as the term gained popularity. In September 2018, Fortnite was featured as a question on the game show Jeopardy!, and was spoofed in a skit on the September 29, 2018, episode of Saturday Night Live. The South Park episode "The Scoots" featured the cast wearing Fortnite-based Halloween costumes. In The Big Bang Theory episode "The Citation Negation", Bernadette attempts to learn how to play Fortnite Battle Royale to beat Howard. Fortnite also makes an easter egg appearance in the Disney animated film Ralph Breaks the Internet. The game was also a central focal point in the 2018 YouTube Rewind year retrospective, and included an appearance by the streamer Ninja.

=== Public reactions and legal disputes ===
Following Fortnite Battle Royale's release on mobile platforms, the game gained significant popularity among younger players due to its free-to-play model, cartoon-like visuals, and gameplay that promotes interaction between peers. Reports emerged of the game disrupting classroom environments and affecting students' ability to complete homework, prompting Epic to include loading screen messages discouraging play during school hours. In 2018, the UK's Secretary of State for Culture, Media and Sport raised concerns about excessive screen time associated with Fortnite Battle Royale and similar games. Organizations such as the U.S. Center on Media and Child Health and the UK's National Society for the Prevention of Cruelty to Children (NSPCC) warned that the game's violent content could influence children's behavior. A Canadian law firm later filed a class-action lawsuit against Epic, alleging the game was designed to be addictive without adequate warnings; courts allowed the case to proceed in December 2022.

Some parents and guardians have cited positive aspects of Fortnite Battle Royale, such as its capacity to facilitate socialization beyond regular peer groups and its comparatively low level of violence. Others used the game as a reward system, or viewed it as a potential avenue for children to develop competitive gaming skills, prompting the emergence of paid tutors. However, the game's role as a social space raised concerns about peer pressure and bullying, especially around cosmetic items. In-game purchases, particularly rare outfits, became status symbols among players, leading some children to spend money to avoid stigma associated with the generic character designs every player is given at the start of play. Additional concerns include children's vulnerability to security risks, including phishing schemes and data breaches, as well as the potential for contact with online predators, with at least one documented case. On November 16, 2023, Epic introduced an age-restriction system limiting the use of certain skins in user-generated content, but reversed the change five days later following widespread criticism.

Since March 2018, Fortnite Battle Royale has been targeted by hackers seeking to access and resell accounts with valuable cosmetic items. Authorities have identified the game as a conduit for credit card fraud, with criminals using stolen credit data to purchase in-game currency and then selling it at a discount through third-party platforms. Security firms, such as Check Point, identified vulnerabilities allowing unauthorized access to accounts, including voice chat interception and fraudulent purchases. Epic patched a major vulnerability by January 2019, but a class-action lawsuit was filed in August of that year over its failure to notify affected users. Epic has also taken enforcement action against players using cheating software, including aimbots, through legal complaints and in-game bans. Several people filed lawsuits over the use of popular dance emotes in the game, including 2 Milly, Donald Faison, Alfonso Ribeiro, Russell Horning ("Backpack Kid"), and the parent of the creator of the "Orange Justice" dance, among many others, claiming unauthorized use of choreography. (Note: Including: Rapper BlocBoy JB sued Epic in January 2019, asserting that the "Hype" emote was based on his "Shoot" dance.; Basketball players Jared Nickens and Jaylen Brantley sought $20 million in damages over Fortnite's use of the "Running Man" dance.; Saxophone player Leo Pellegrino filed a suit not over a specific dance move, but alleging misappropriation of his trademarked likeness through an in-game emote that featured a dancing saxophone player. A federal district judge ruled in March 2020 that Fortnite sufficiently transforms Pellegrino's move from his overall likeness to qualify for First Amendment protections, and summarily ruled against all but one of Pellegrino's other claims.; Choreographer Kyle Hanagami sued Epic, claiming that Fortnite emotes used his original choreography. It was initially dismissed by a federal district court, but was overruled by the Ninth Circuit in November 2023, who argued that while individual poses of a dance move cannot be copyrighted, the overall choreography of a full dance could be copyrightable, allowing the case against Epic to continue forward.) Epic sought dismissal on the grounds that simple dance moves are not copyrightable, though many of these lawsuits were withdrawn following a 2019 U.S. Supreme Court ruling requiring copyright registration before filing infringement claims.

In August 2020, Epic reduced V-Bucks prices by 20% on all platforms except the iOS App Store and Google Play, simultaneously introducing a direct payment option to bypass the standard 30% fee issued to host the game on their platforms. Apple and Google responded by removing Fortnite Battle Royale from their respective stores, prompting Epic to file lawsuits accusing both companies of anti-competitive behavior. Courts denied Epic's request to reinstate the game on iOS, and a 2021 ruling permanently barred Apple from prohibiting developers from directing users to alternative payment systems. Meanwhile, Epic worked with Nvidia and Microsoft to make Fortnite Battle Royale accessible via browser-based cloud gaming. Fortnite Battle Royale returned to the App Store in the E.U. in August 2024, and in the U.S. in May 2025.

Other legal disputes have included a copyright lawsuit by PUBG Corp., later dropped, and several cases involving breaches of non-disclosure agreements by testers who leaked unreleased content. A class-action lawsuit was filed against Epic for the Item Shop not changing at the specified time, creating deceptive timers. Epic also pursued legal action against individuals and YouTubers distributing cheat software and selling modified accounts. In 2025, Epic introduced a Darth Vader character using generative AI based on James Earl Jones' recordings, which led to the actors' union SAG-AFTRA filing a complaint, stating that although Jones had approved use of his voice for posthumous AI replication, Epic was still required to negotiate licensing terms with the union.
