= Fortnite seasonal events =

Fortnite's logo

Fortnite is a free-to-play video game platform developed by Epic Games. Fortnite originally was developed as the cooperative player-versus-environment survival game, Fortnite Save the World, released in July 2017. The game's development shifted significantly following the beta release of the Fortnite Battle Royale in September 2017, a battle royale game where 100 players compete to be the last player standing. After dropping from an airborne Battle Bus onto an island featuring several points of interest (POIs), players gather various weapons and gear. During a round of gameplay, a harmful storm front periodically shrinks while moving across the map, drawing players into smaller areas on the island.

This new mode proved exceptionally popular, drawing large numbers of players. With Fortnite Battle Royale's success, Epic expanded the Fortnite platform to include other games and user-created modes built atop Unreal Engine and the Unreal Editor for Fortnite (UEFN) system.

Since December 2017, Fortnite has included seasonal content purchasable via the battle pass, with various cosmetic rewards. Each season lasts for two to three months. Starting towards the end of the third season in April 2018, Epic began introducing a narrative structure to their seasons, to explain changes to the island and to introduce new licensed cosmetic items. Fortnite has conducted continuous collaborations, such as with Disney, Marvel, and Star Wars themed seasons.

By 2025, the Fortnite platform supported the Epic-developed games Fortnite Battle Royale, Fortnite: Save the World, Lego Fortnite, Fortnite Festival, Rocket Racing, and Fortnite Ballistic, along with user-created games in Fortnite Creative and Fall Guys.

== Background ==
To monetize the game, Epic Games had built an in-game storefront to offer cosmetics in the form of character skins, emotes, and other customization items for the player to use with their game avatar for Fortnite Battle Royale, using "V-Bucks" as the form of in-game currency to make these purchases. In December 2017, Epic Games introduced a purchasable battle pass that featured numerous customization items earnable through gameplay, along with V-Bucks. The battle passes are time-limited and can only be completed during the current Chapter, typically over three to four months, with Chapter 1 representing all content from September 2017 to the launch of the Chapter and battle pass system in December 2017.

Initially, each Chapter brought about changes to the layout of the island. With the launch of Season 4 in May 2018, Epic Games used a series of in-game events to tease a narrative structure that would be used for all future seasons, and used further in-game events to explain changes to the island's map. Chief creative officer Donald Mustard explained that the idea of including narrative had been part of the concept of Fornite Battle Royale from the start, but because the game is primarily a multiplayer game, determining how to introduce story element had been difficult. Epic found that driving toward large, end-of-chapter events would lead to changes in the island in the next season.

Prior to the start of Chapter 2 in October 2019, Epic also introduced character skins and cosmetics based on licensed characters. Since then, Epic has broken the storyline into Chapters grouping several seasons, with each season adding further crossover content from other licensed properties. Beginning with 2023, each Chapter can also contain "mini seasons" which are typically one month long.

A side-mode, Fortnite OG, began in December 2024 and progressed through the first chapter of Battle Royale, offering the original experience with some newer quality-of-life changes.

== Seasonal content ==
=== Chapter 1 ===
Season	Period	Description	Collaborations
Season 1 ("First Steps") (OG: "The OG OG Returns")	Battle Royale: September – December 2017; OG: December 2024 – January 2025	Retroactively considered the first season of the first chapter upon the start of the chapter's second season.	
Season 2 ("Fort Knights") (OG: "Go Full Tilt")	Battle Royale: December 2017 – February 2018; OG: January – March 2025	Medieval themed. The battle pass, which initially had 70 tiers, was introduced. A mid-season update added 5 new locations, including Tilted Towers.	
Season 3 ("Meteor Strike") (OG: "Brace for Impact")	Battle Royale: February – April 2018; OG: March – June 2025	Space exploration themed. The Battle Pass was increased from 70 tiers to 100. During the season, players had observed shooting stars crossing the Island, which later became small meteorites that struck the surface. A larger meteor also became visible, beginning a crash course towards the Island.	
Season 4 ("Brace for Impact") (OG: "Prepare for Launch")	Battle Royale: May – July 2018; OG: June – August 2025	Superhero themed. Superhero and villain bases appeared on the Island, later revealed to be part of a movie set. For a limited time, players could play as or fight against Thanos as part of a collaboration event with Marvel. (Note: To promote the release of Avengers: Infinity War (2018).) The large meteor wiped out Dusty Depot, leaving behind a large crater. Inside, a mysterious pod was found that contained a character known as "The Visitor", who then raided the villain base to steal a prop rocket. Using meteor remnants from the crater, the Visitor turned the prop into a real rocket, which launched and created a massive interdimensional rift above the Island. OG: An "alternate" version of the Visitor arrived on the island instead. Right before the rocket launched, a red rift butterfly appeared. The resulting rift above the Island ended up being colored red.	
Season 5 ("Worlds Collide")	Battle Royale: July – September 2018; OG: August – October 2025	The next few days following the rocket launch saw the rift growing increasingly larger, bringing in objects from other realities while also causing some native items to vanish. One of these items, a Durrr Burger head, ended up in the real world. The southeastern corner of the map was turned into a desert, and smaller rifts began to appear as a new gameplay feature, teleporting players into the sky. Near the end of the season, the massive rift closed, but not before transporting a large purple Cube to the Island. This Cube, nicknamed "Kevin" by the players, rolled around the Island before sinking into Loot Lake, leaving behind a trail of corruption and turning the lake purple. OG: Certain objects were rifted into other Fortnite game modes, such as the Durrr Burger head instead ending up in the Blitz reality. As the now-red rift closed, it instead transported a large red Cube, internally named "Revin," to the island. It followed the same path as Kevin had, before sinking into Loot Lake, turning it red.	
Season 6 ("Darkness Rises")	Battle Royale: September – December 2018; OG: October – November 2025	Corruption themed. The island at the center of Loot Lake rose into the sky due to the effects of the Cube, which traveled to multiple locations across the larger Island before returning to Loot Lake and opening a portal in the sky, allowing hostile "Cube Monsters" to appear on the Island. In a live event, the overloaded Cube exploded, transporting everyone to a realm known as the "In-Between". A rift-shaped Butterfly appeared, which returned the players back onto the Island. Loot Lake had been mostly restored to normal, with the exception of the appearance of tiny landmasses. Before the end of the season, a large iceberg was spotted on the southwestern corner of the Island. OG: The floating Loot Lake island's cube returned to being purple like it originally had. As portal was opening, red and purple corruption could be seen in the house in the floating island. During the live event, Revin could be spotted in the "In-Between."	
Season 7 ("You Better Watch Out")	Battle Royale: December 2018 – February 2019; OG: December 2025 – March 2026	Winter themed. The iceberg collided with the Island, blanketing a third of the map in snow. Fortnite Creative launched, and players could design their own square-shaped location to appear on the island located at The Block, replacing Risky Reels. The iceberg itself began to thaw as the season progressed, revealing a large castle inhabited by the Ice King, who then cast a spell that unleashed a winter storm across the entire Island. A virtual concert performed by Marshmello occurred in February. At the end of the season, the Ice King's prisoner escaped and created a large volcano on the northeast corner of the map, reclaiming his powers of the Fire King. The volcano's appearance caused earthquakes that rocked the Island, creating fissures in the ground. OG: The Block's inclusion was omitted in OG, so it simply fell off the north side of the island, sparing Risky Reels. The Ice King took on a new form later seen in Chapter 7: Season 2.	Marshmello
Season 8 ("X Marks the Spot")	Battle Royale: February – May 2019; OG: April – June 2026	Pirate themed. After the volcano had drastically altered the landscape of the Island in the northeast, launching The Block westwards and crashing into a motel, digging sites were established that would later uncover a Vault underneath Loot Lake. Over time, the Vault gained power through the use of five mysterious runes that acted on their own accord. In the meanwhile, Thanos returned for another limited-time Marvel event. (Note: To promote the release of Avengers: Endgame (2019).) In the "Unvaulting" live event, players entered the Vault to vote on one of six items to be reintroduced into the game. Inside, the Vault houses the Zero Point, an orb of pure energy created by the Big Bang, serving as the core of all of reality. After the Drum Gun won the vote, the volcano erupted, scattering debris in the air which would ultimately destroy Tilted Towers and Retail Row, and cause damage to the iceberg. OG: The Block was launched further west and crashed on a hill, sparing the motel. The Dark Harvester, a spaceship first seen in Chapter 7, briefly appeared and scanned Loot Lake, before leaving through a golden rift. During the event, players instead voted for the Infinity Blade previously only present in Season 7.	Black Widow and Star-Lord (Marvel)
Season 9 ("The Future Is Yours")	Battle Royale: May – July 2019 OG: June – September 2026	Futuristic themed. The locations that were destroyed by the volcanic eruption were reconstructed with futuristic technology through the use of the Zero Point's power, with Tilted Towers becoming Neo Tilted and Retail Row becoming Mega Mall. The damage to the iceberg caused a monster known as the Devourer to escape into the waters surrounding the Island. With the help of the Zero Point's guardian Singularity, drones inside the volcano's caldera constructed a giant mech called the "Mecha Team Leader". In a live event, Mecha activated and engaged the Devourer, but ended up getting overpowered. Severely damaged, Mecha was forced to pull the Zero Point out of the Vault to regain power before using a sword hidden in Neo Tilted to kill the Devourer. Mecha flew off into space, leaving the Devourer's corpse and a severely damaged Zero Point behind, which exploded at the end of the season.	John Wick and Sofia Al-Azwar (John Wick); Chief Hopper and a Demogorgon (Stranger Things)
Season X ("Out of Time")	Battle Royale: August – October 2019 OG: September – December 2026	Time travel themed. The Zero Point's explosion caused a shift in space-time on the Island, bringing the previously destroyed Dusty Depot to the present. As a result of Dusty Depot's return, the meteor that destroyed it was frozen in time in the present. A character named "The Scientist" emerged from the meteor, who was part of a group known as "the Seven" alongside the Visitor. To bring the remaining members of the Seven to the Island, the Scientist created rift zones across the Island, bringing in regions from other universes (like Borderlands' Pandora and DC's Gotham City). In "The End" finale event, the Scientist launched a rocket from Dusty Depot, with each rift zone opening to allow the remaining six rockets to travel through. The seven rockets unfroze the meteor and took it through another rift, positioning it directly above the Zero Point. The meteor descended and struck the Zero Point, creating a black hole that consumed the Island, leaving the entire game unplayable. Following the event, players could enter the Konami code to play a minigame. OG: The Block vanished, with the motel somehow being destroyed alongside it. The order of the rift zones were shuffled, with Pandora and Gotham City first.	Psycho Bandit (Borderlands); Batman and Catwoman (DC Comics); Major Lazer

=== Chapter 2 ===
Season	Period	Description	Collaborations
Season 1 ("New World")	October 2019 – February 2020 (Note: Chapter 2: Season 1 was originally set to conclude in December 2019, but was pushed back to February 2020.)	After 36 hours, the black hole collapsed and reorganized the Island's matter, creating a new Island with the Zero Point contained once more. New mechanics such as boats, fishing, swimming, and carrying downed players were introduced. AI-controlled players known as "bots" were added to matches as "filler" players. In a live event, Emperor Palpatine broadcast a message across the Island as the Millennium Falcon flew in the skies above, promising revenge for the Sith. (Note: These events tie into Star Wars: The Rise of Skywalker (2019), which had a premiere of an exclusive scene, hosted by Geoff Keighley.)	Rey, Finn, Kylo Ren, Zorii Bliss, a Stormtrooper, and a Sith Trooper (Star Wars); Ninja; Harley Quinn (DC Extended Universe)
Season 2 ("Top Secret")	February – June 2020 (Note: Chapter 2: Season 2 was originally supposed to conclude in late April 2020, but was pushed back to early June due to the COVID-19 Pandemic. The season's conclusion was delayed further to mid-June due to racial unrest in the United States.)	Secret agent themed. A mysterious group known as the Agency took control of the Island under two competing factions: SHADOW and GHOST. Boss battles were introduced at certain locations, with players being able to raid and loot them using various options such as adopting disguises and disabling the defense's power source. Defeated agents could also be shaken down to expose the locations of other enemies. A virtual concert performed by Travis Scott occurred in April. Under the Agency's headquarters at the center of the Island, their leader Midas had been constructing a device in an attempt to destroy the Storm and break the Loop. In a live event at the end of the season, this plan went awry, and instead a large wall of water surrounded the Island. As this was happening, players drifted in and out of a mysterious office setting and briefly interacted with a blonde-haired agent.	Deadpool, Psylocke, Domino, and Cable (Marvel); Loserfruit; Travis Scott
Season 3 (Note: Until May 2025, iOS and macOS clients for Fortnite were not updated past Chapter 2: Season 3 for users outside of the European Union due to Epic Games v. Apple and Epic Games v. Google. Fortnite was returned to the U.S. App Store in May 2025. Android players can continue playing Fortnite via the Epic Games Store, while macOS users and iOS users in other territories can play Fortnite through cloud streaming services.) ("Splashdown!")	June – August 2020	Aquatic themed. The wall of water broke, flooding the Island and leaving most locations submerged underwater. Throughout the season, the Storm was a wall of water that offered greater mobility compared to previous Storm circles. As the season progressed, the water levels started to subside, later revealing a location on the northwestern corner of the Island named Coral Castle, seemingly inspired by the city of Atlantis.	Aquaman and Black Manta (DC Extended Universe); Captain America (Marvel)
Season 4 ("Nexus War")	August – December 2020	Marvel themed. This season contained a Marvel themed battle pass and POIs. The comic prelude revealed that Thor and Galactus were transported to the Island by a rift once Galactus became tempted by the energy of the Zero Point, threatening all of reality. In order to stop Galactus from consuming the Zero Point, Thor summoned numerous superheroes and supervillains from the Marvel universe to confront him. In "The Devourer of Worlds" live event, Iron Man armed a fleet of Battle Buses with gamma bombs and had the players lure Galactus into inhaling them all, causing an explosion that sends him back to his home reality. However, the Zero Point had been pulled out of the center of the Island by Galactus and was severely damaged, leading to the events of the following season. (Note: Galactus' appearance in "The Devourer of Worlds" influenced his portrayal in the Marvel Cinematic Universe film The Fantastic Four: First Steps (2025).)	Thor, She-Hulk, Groot, Rocket Raccoon, Storm, Doctor Doom, Mystique, Iron Man, Wolverine, Venom, Silver Surfer, Blade, Daredevil, and Ghost Rider (Marvel); Joker and Poison Ivy (DC Comics); J Balvin; Lachlan
Season 5 ("Zero Point")	December 2020 – March 2021	Hunter themed. In-game currency known as "Bars" and the Fortnite Crew subscription were introduced. The unearthed Zero Point had created a massive desert in the center of the Island, and some locations from the past returned as a result. The blonde-haired agent– John "Jonesy" Jones– was tasked with recruiting various hunters from different realities on behalf of the Imagined Order (IO) in order to maintain every player within the Loop. Players that were trapped in the Loop by repeatedly engaging in the battle royale were known as "Loopers". As the IO aimed to establish "perfect order" across all realities, the Seven fought to break the Loop and set everyone free. Near the end of the season, the Zero Point started to gradually destabilize, becoming visibly unstable with pulsating effects appearing around it.	The Mandalorian and Grogu (Star Wars); Kratos (God of War); Master Chief (Halo); Ant-Man, Black Panther, Captain Marvel, and Taskmaster (Marvel); The Flash and Green Arrow (DC Comics); Michonne and Daryl Dixon (The Walking Dead); T-800 and Sarah Connor (Terminator); Snake Eyes (G.I. Joe); Ryu and Chun-Li (Street Fighter); Ellen Ripley and Xenomorph (Alien); Predator (Predator); LazarBeam; TheGrefg
Season 6 ("Primal")	March – June 2021	Wilderness themed. In the "Zero Crisis Finale", Jones defected from the IO to join the Seven. The Foundation, the leader of the Seven, agreed to help Jones and the Looper to stabilize the Zero Point in exchange for information on IO's leader Geno and the whereabouts of two members of the Seven. With no other options, Jones was forced to help seal The Foundation within the Zero Point, which also trapped him within the Loop. The Zero Point was contained in a Spire. A "reality wave" created by the Zero Point replaced the surrounding area's modern technology with primitive tools, forming a "Primal" biome and sending the Island to a primal age. Furthermore, wild animals were added, which roamed throughout the island. Near the end of the season, the Spire ended up attracting extraterrestrial attention, and UFOs began to appear on the Island. Aliens made contact with the Loopers in the form of puzzles, which revealed their identity: "The Last Reality".	Lara Croft (Tomb Raider); Deathstroke, Raven and Beast Boy (DC Comics); Aloy (Horizon Zero Dawn); Kelsier (Mistborn); Neymar Jr.
Season 7 ("Invasion!")	June – September 2021	Alien invasion themed. The Last Reality began its invasion, leading to the IO returning to the Island. The Last Reality's mothership destroyed the Spire, unintentionally releasing the Foundation and rifting him to a mysterious ocean in Gotham City. To gather information on the history of the Island, the Loop and the Loopers, the Last Reality created the Rift Tour, which was headlined by Ariana Grande . In the game, the Rift Butterfly manifested itself through Ariana, who freed the Loopers from The Last Reality. This concert took place in August 2021. In the "Operation: Sky Fire" live event, IO military leader Doctor Slone led the Loopers to plant bombs on the mothership in hopes of ending the invasion. However, the mothership had been carrying several Cubes (similar to Kevin in Chapter 1: Season 6), and they were controlled by the Last Reality. Slone abandoned the Loopers after the bombs were successfully armed and left them to die, but they survived by "rebooting" one of the Cubes. The mothership exploded, releasing the Cubes onto the Island.	Superman, Wonder Woman, and Bloodsport (DC Comics); Rick Sanchez and Morty Smith (Rick and Morty); Thanos, Gamora, Shang-Chi, and Loki (Marvel); Guile and Cammy (Street Fighter); Dude (Free Guy); Mike Lowrey (Bad Boys); LeBron James (Space Jam: A New Legacy); Ariana Grande; Harry Kane and Marco Reus; Bugha; Guggimon (Superplastic); Gildedguy
Season 8 ("Cubed")	September – December 2021	Cube themed. The Island descended into chaos as it became corrupted by the Cubes, which opened portals to a monster-populated reality known as the Sideways. A Golden Cube was among the other Cubes, and spent the season roaming the Island to reproduce with other Cubes, before settling at the former Spire site. The Cube Queen emerged from the Golden Cube and slowly built a Pyramid of Cubes as she prepared to annihilate all realities. In "The End" finale event, the Cube Queen opened a portal to the Last Reality, allowing numerous UFOs and motherships to rain destruction down on the Island. Jones, who was held captive by Slone following the Zero Crisis Finale, was freed by the Foundation (revealed to be portrayed by Dwayne Johnson), having escaped Gotham City. The Scientist and the Visitor evacuated the Loopers to an underground chamber, while the Foundation manipulated IO technology to rotate the Island, revealing another Island on the flipside. As the landmass was being flipped, the Last Reality's weakness to water forced them to retreat. The underground chamber flooded, washing the Loopers away into the ocean.	Carnage, Nick Fury, Eddie Brock, and Dark Phoenix (Marvel); The Batman Who Laughs (DC Comics); Paul Atreides and Chani (Dune); Chris Redfield and Jill Valentine (Resident Evil); Rick Grimes (The Walking Dead); Jinx (Arcane: League of Legends); Frankenstein's monster, Frankenstein's bride, and The Mummy (Universal Monsters); Naruto Uzumaki, Sasuke Uchiha, Sakura Haruno and Kakashi Hatake (Naruto); El Chapulín Colorado (Chespirito); Janky (Superplastic)

=== Chapter 3 ===
Season	Period	Description	Collaborations
Season 1 ("Flipped")	December 2021 – March 2022	The Loopers slowly drifted towards the new Island, and the Foundation revealed that the Fortnite world (or Reality Zero) was a two-sided, flat piece of hollow land encapsulating the Zero Point in its center, encased in an atmospheric orb floating in space. This new Island bore a striking resemblance to the Chapter 1 Island, with the returning Tilted Towers, Loot Lake, and volcano being in familiar positions. New features such as sliding and zip lines were introduced. Near the end of the season, the IO began drilling to the Flipside, causing earthquakes across the Island. They established a base in the mountains and expanded their drilling in preparation with war with the Seven.	Dwayne Johnson as The Foundation; Spider-Man, Michelle Jones, Green Goblin, Clint Barton, Kate Bishop, Rogue, and Gambit (Marvel); Marcus Fenix and Kait Diaz (Gears of War); Boba Fett, Fennec Shand, and Black Krrsantan (Star Wars); Vi (Arcane: League of Legends); Nathan Drake and Chloe Frazer (Uncharted); Ezio Auditore da Firenze (Assassin's Creed); Bruno Mars and Anderson .Paak (Silk Sonic); Naomi Osaka
Season 2 ("Resistance")	March – June 2022	War themed. The IO launched a large-scale invasion of the Island, clashing with the Seven to reclaim it and the Zero Point for themselves. At the start of the season, the IO disabled the building mechanic, but the Loopers and the Seven worked to restore it. A Zero Build game mode would later be added as a permanent variant for Battle Royale. After the Seven retook most of the Island, the IO drained Loot Lake and built the Collider in its place, aiming to destroy the Island and take the Zero Point. In response, the Seven located Mecha Team Leader on an icy moon, which had been piloted by the Paradigm. In tie-in comics, the Paradigm had conspired with the IO to build Mecha, and she explained that without the IO's involvement, they would have built the Collider to contain the Devourer. After defeating the Devourer, Mecha crashed into the moon, knocking the Paradigm out until the Seven located her. In the "Collision" live event, the Seven rebuilt Mecha to launch a final attack on the IO and the Collider. As Mecha prepared to destroy the Collider, it fell into a large underground pit, revealing it was powered by an overclocked Zero Point, which begins phasing between different realities. Slone ambushed Jones, the Foundation, and the Loopers in a tank, but a weakened Mecha destroyed it, presumably killing Slone. The Zero Point then honed in on Geno's new location, leading Jones and the Foundation to jump into it to pursue him. The Loopers succeeded in destroying the Collider, and were evacuated by Mecha. Tie-in comics set after Collision saw Jones and the Foundation finding Geno and a member of the Seven, The Imagined, disintegrating as a result of coming into contact with the unfocused Zero Point, causing their matter to be scattered across realities. Before disappearing, Geno warned them about the dangers the Island may face without the IO's control. Although thought to have died, Geno was able to reclaim his body in another reality.	Doctor Strange, Prowler, Scarlet Witch, Moon Knight/Mr. Knight, and Mary Jane Watson (Marvel); Obi-Wan Kenobi (Star Wars); Pac-Man; Sakura Kasugano and Blanka (Street Fighter); RoboCop (RoboCop); Female Eivor Varinsdottir (Assassin's Creed); Chloe Kim; Chica; Ali-A
Season 3 ("Vibin'")	June – September 2022	Party themed. The IO's defeat led the Loopers to celebrate and enjoy their freedom, even though the Loop had not yet been destroyed. The Zero Point caused a large tree known as the Reality Tree to blossom, covering the western side of the Island with large mushrooms and flora. Yet as they celebrated, a sinister entity watched over the Island. Throughout the season, the Zero Point began summoning artifacts to the Island, which served as distress signals as its newfound freedom exposed it to new threats. At the end of the season, the Foundation and the Imagined's sister, the Order, mysteriously went missing.	Darth Vader (Star Wars); Indiana Jones (Indiana Jones); Mighty Thor (Thor: Love and Thunder); Hinata Hyuga, Gaara, Itachi Uchiha, and Orochimaru (Naruto); Starfire and Dreamer (DC Comics); Commander Zavala, Ikora Rey, and Exo Stranger (Destiny); John Cena (WWE); Son Goku, Vegeta, Bulma, and Beerus (Dragon Ball); Patrick Mahomes; Crewmate (Among Us)
Season 4 ("Paradise")	September – December 2022	"Chrome" themed. The remaining members of the Seven were overtaken by a mysterious substance known as "Chrome", with the Paradigm being the only one of the group to escape. The Chrome infected and converted anything it touches into itself, and it was being controlled by the Herald, who was watching over the Island in the previous season. The Chrome was later revealed to be acting for the Last Reality, which was led by an entity known as The Nothing. The Chrome slowly infected the Island as the season progressed, overtaking numerous locations. In the "Fracture" finale event, the Herald fused with the Reality Tree, destroying all of Reality Zero but leaving the Zero Point intact. For 40 minutes, the Loopers assisted the Paradigm to initiate Zero Fusion, bringing in landmass from other realities to form a new one-sided Island around the Zero Point. The Paradigm seemingly sacrificed herself to complete the process.	Brie Larson as The Paradigm; Spider-Gwen and X-23 (Marvel); Black Adam (Black Adam); Luke Skywalker, Han Solo, and Leia Organa (Star Wars); Ash Williams (Evil Dead); Mr. Meeseeks and Queen Summer (Rick and Morty); Goat (Goat Simulator); SypherPK

=== Chapter 4 ===
Season	Period	Description	Collaborations
Season 1 ("A New Beginning")	December 2022 – March 2023	Medieval themed. An advanced medieval organization called the Oathbound had occupied one of three biomes on the Island. Their leader, the Ageless, was a younger clone of Geno who ordered his Rift Warden Stellan to build the Rift Gate under his Citadel. Accompanying Stellan was AMIE, an AI that served the Seven and was determined to locate them. A "Shapeless Man" (implied to be Geno) had been haunting Stellan, goading him to construct the Rift Gate to help him return to the Island and establish a world of "perfect order". Meanwhile, AMIE and the Looper decode a message seemingly from the Last Reality, suggesting that the Seven were held captive and are in grave danger. As a result, AMIE tampered with the Rift Gate by altering its coordinates to where the message came from, and traveled through it to find the Seven, in particular her creator The Scientist, whom she had romantic feelings for. This destabilized and destroyed the Rift Gate, and opened a red rift in the sky instead. Following this, the Shapeless Man stopped haunting Stellan.	Doom Slayer (DOOM); Geralt of Rivia (The Witcher); Hulk and Sam Wilson (Captain America) (Marvel); Izuku Midoriya, Katsuki Bakugo, Ochaco Uraraka, and All Might (My Hero Academia); Giannis Antetokounmpo; MrBeast; Isaac Clarke (Dead Space); Son Gohan and Piccolo (Dragon Ball Super); Adonis Creed (Rocky); The Kid Laroi; Flakes Power
Season 2 ("MEGAメガ")	March – June 2023	Cyberpunk/Neo-Japan themed. A large Japanese-styled biome crashed onto the southeastern corner of the Island from the red rift, which spawned the futuristic MEGA City and other Japanese-styled locations. Controlling the biome was the Peace Syndicate, which was gathering intel on the Last Reality. A saboteur had corrupted the Peace Syndicate's intel while also orchestrating tensions between it and other syndicates, nearly sparking a war between them. The Looper worked with the Peace Syndicate to cool tensions between the other syndicates and united them against the saboteur, who was later revealed to be working for the Last Reality. An inter-syndicate war was successfully averted, although fissures began to appear around the Island at the end of the season, with vines sprouting from them.	Eren Yeager, Mikasa Ackerman, and Levi Ackerman (Attack on Titan); Leon S. Kennedy and Claire Redfield (Resident Evil 2); Anakin Skywalker, Padmé Amidala, Darth Maul, and Clone troopers (Star Wars); Goku Black (Dragon Ball Super); Miles Morales and Spider-Man 2099 (Spider-Man: Across the Spider-Verse)
Season 3 ("Wilds")	June – August 2023	Jungle themed. The center of the island had collapsed, revealing an abandoned jungle full of ancient secrets. Slone, previously thought deceased, had distanced herself from the IO and was now studying the ancient ruins with Optimus Prime. Atop one of the temples sat a ruined telescope known as the Apparatus, which Slone and other explorers repaired. Slone's continued studies of the ruins led her to a prophecy called the "Eclipse", which although astrologically impossible, was fated to occur. The Zero Point could be found nearby the Apparatus, depleted of its energy and encased in stone. Optimus Prime made a radio announcement to warn the Island of the impending dangers they would face without the power of the Zero Point.	Optimus Prime and Optimus Primal (Transformers); Yennefer of Vengerberg and Ciri (The Witcher); Nord Warrior (The Elder Scrolls Online); Philip J. Fry, Bender, and Leela (Futurama); The Terminator (Terminator); Satoru Gojo, Yuji Itadori, Megumi Fushiguro, and Nobara Kugisaki (Jujutsu Kaisen); Becky Lynch and Bianca Belair (WWE)
Season 4 ("Last Resort")	August – November 2023	Heist themed. Time-traveling vampire Kado Thorne took up residence on the Island, bringing with him a trove of valuable items that he stole from Fortnite's past. Slone and her associate Nolan Chance, with the help of the Looper, assembled a team to steal Kado's time machine, which he had set to "July 12th, 2018". (Note: The beginning date for Chapter 1: Season 5.) The Eclipse began and Kado turned into a revenant vampire, but Slone, Nolan, the returning Jones, and their crew successfully completed their heist. While running tests on the time machine, objects from Chapter 1 were brought into the present, including the Durrr Burger head. Although Kado's fate was left ambiguous, Jones prepared to go back in time.	Khaby Lame; Ahsoka Tano (Star Wars); Shoto Todoroki, Eijiro Kirishima, and Mina Ashido (My Hero Academia); Bumblebee and Megatron (Transformers); Michael Myers (Halloween); Jack Skellington (The Nightmare Before Christmas); Alan Wake (Alan Wake)
Season OG	November – December 2023	Chapter 1 themed mini-season. The Battle Pass (called the "OG Pass") featured mashups of Chapter 1 skins, and was 50 tiers instead of 100. Metro Boomin created the season's lobby track. Jones traveled back in time to the Chapter 1 Island, which had a few differences as Jones' time jump had slightly altered history. Each week, the map updated to reflect the seasonal changes in Chapter 1, starting with Season 5 and then Season 6, 7/8, and 9/X. Some locations from Chapter 1 were however omitted for Season OG, such as Gotham City and Dusty Depot. Slone recorded multiple audio logs that she sent back in time to Jones, instructing him to perform an "extraction" that involved salvaging the Zero Point and all of reality, and she bade Jones goodbye, as his actions would change the future. The Zero Point emerged from Loot Lake, and the Time Machine was strapped to the rocket, which began to launch. In "The Big Bang" finale event, events played out like Chapter 1's "The End" event, although the rocket— and later the meteor— started to glitch out due to the effects of the Time Machine. The glitching meteor struck the Zero Point and the island collapsed in on itself, but instead of a black hole forming, the Big Bang occurred, resulting in old and new realities beginning to materialize. Among these new realities were Lego Fortnite, Rocket Racing, and Fortnite Festival, which were released in the opening dates of Chapter 5. Fall Guys x Fortnite and a fast-paced "Reload" mode were added in July 2024, while a standalone OG mode was added in December 2024, expanding on Season OG.	Eleven (Stranger Things); Lewis Hamilton; Invincible, Omni-Man, Atom Eve, and the Immortal (Invincible); Eminem

=== Chapter 5 ===
Season	Period	Description	Collaborations
Season 1 ("Underground")	December 2023 – March 2024	Due to the Big Bang, a new timeline was formed, and Jones traveled to a new reality. Peely, Jones' anthropomorphic banana friend, was taken hostage, plunging the Island into a battle between two factions known as The Underground - led by Jones and his new partner Hope - and The Society, the faction holding Peely hostage, led by Hope's sister Valeria. Valeria had planned to use Peely to interrogate Jones about an ancient chest, but as Jones was able to rescue Peely from the Society, she continued the search on her own, leading to a massive arm carrying the chest to emerge from the ground. The Loopers opened the chest, revealing a tornado of souls inside, leading Valeria to flee and leave the rest of the Society members behind.	Peter Griffin and Ernie the Giant Chicken (Family Guy); Solid Snake and Raiden (Metal Gear); Leonardo, Raphael, Donatello, Michelangelo, April O'Neil, Shredder, and Master Splinter (Teenage Mutant Ninja Turtles); Frieza and Cell (Dragon Ball); Fortnite Festival: The Weeknd, followed by Lady Gaga
Season 2 ("Myths & Mortals")	March – May 2024	Greek mythology themed. Fortnite-themed versions of Zeus, Hades, Aphrodite, Artemis, Poseidon, Cerberus, Medusa, Ares, Charon, Apollo, and Perseus are introduced. The northwestern and southeastern regions of the Island transformed into the Underworld and Olympus respectively as the Oracle foretold a prophecy in which Zeus would turn his wrath towards humanity; Zeus attacked and defeated the Society, and the Looper was enlisted to help defeat Zeus. Throughout the season, the player recruited Aphrodite, Artemis and Medusa to stand against Zeus, allowing Jones and Hope to defeat the weakened Zeus. The statue on Mount Olympus then came to life and fired a lightning bolt at the chest (revealed to be Pandora's box), producing a mysterious spark of energy that attracted a sandstorm that began to approach the Island.	Korra, Aang, Appa, Katara, Toph Beifong, and Zuko (Avatar: The Last Airbender and The Legend of Korra); Drax, Mantis, Hela, God Loki (from Loki season 2), and Sylvie Laufeydottir (Marvel); Fortnite Festival: Billie Eilish; Chewbacca, Lando Calrissian, a Death Trooper, Yoda, and C-3PO (Star Wars); Dabi, Himiko Toga, and Tomura Shigaraki (My Hero Academia)
Season 3 ("Wrecked")	May – August 2024	Post-apocalyptic themed. Most of the Greek gods fled following Zeus' defeat, including Zeus himself, as the sandstorm made landfall on the south side of the Island, creating a large wasteland biome populated by marauders seeking control of the island. They were led by Megalo Don, who was accompanied by an ominous figure known as "The Wanderer". The Oracle revealed that Hope and Pandora's box are intertwined in fate, (Note: Revealing Hope as Elpis from Greek mythology.) allowing Hope to see the future, but the Wanderer's interference had irreversibly altered their destinies. Sensing doom, Magneto planted Stark-made Rift Beacons across the Island to call for reinforcements to confront the Wanderer. Simultaneously, the Wanderer betrayed Megalo Don by sabotaging a pipeline he had built to power his Leviathan warship, causing it to explode and reveal Pandora's box under the rubble. The Wanderer then took the box's powers for himself.	T-60 Power Armor and Vault Boy (Fallout); Magneto, Cyclops, Jubilee, and Colossus (Marvel); The Employee (Lethal Company); Fortnite Festival: James Hetfield, Lars Ulrich, Kirk Hammett, and Robert Trujillo (Metallica); Nick Eh 30; Jack Sparrow, Davy Jones, Elizabeth Swann, and Hector Barbossa (Pirates of the Caribbean); Trunks, Android 17, and Android 18 (Dragon Ball); IG-11 and Moff Gideon (Star Wars); The Beans (Fall Guys)
Season 4 ("Absolute Doom")	August – November 2024	Doctor Doom themed. This marked the second season to be themed around Marvel Comics. The Wanderer was revealed to be Doom, having defeated Magneto and his reinforcements, as well as Galactus. He established territory on the northern parts of the Island to annex it into Latveria. Jones assumed the role of Captain America to lead the remaining heroes with Hope, who was prophesied by the Oracle to defeat Doom. Doom retreated to assemble a new set of armor in order to contain the power of Pandora's box as Hope and Shuri reconfigured the Rift Beacons in order to send Doom away to another reality. After more Rift Beacons were planted, an enlarged and empowered Doom returned to the Island. Led by Hope, the Loopers joined Jones and other Marvel heroes in a battle to entrap Doom into being rifted away. Later on, a Rift Butterfly merged the Island with New York City as Snoop Dogg and Ice Spice headlined a concert in Times Square, before blinding the Loopers with a flash of light.	Gwenpool (with Dark Gwenpool), War Machine (with Iron Patriot), Emma Frost, Mysterio, Shuri, Black Cat, Iron Spider, Mephisto, Agony, She-Venom, Spider-Woman, and Meowscles (as Sabretooth) (Marvel); Fortnite Festival: Karol G; El Rubius; Shaquille O'Neal; Mr. Incredible, Elastigirl, and Frozone (The Incredibles); Billy the Puppet (Saw); Leatherface (The Texas Chain Saw Massacre); Sally (The Nightmare Before Christmas); Edward Scissorhands (Edward Scissorhands); Cruella de Vil, Maleficent, and Captain Hook (Disney's One Hundred and One Dalmatians, Sleeping Beauty, and Peter Pan respectively)
Chapter 2 Remix	November 2024	Hip hop music themed mini-season set in early Chapter 2, (Note: Primarily during the events of Chapter 2: Season 2.) with Snoop Dogg, Eminem and Ice Spice in charge of locations formerly associated with Midas' Crew. Like Season OG, "remixed" versions of Chapter 2 outfits were featured, and the Battle Pass was 50 tiers instead of 100. The late Juice Wrld watched over the Island from afar. Hidden audio logs revealed Hope had been unsuccessfully reaching out to Valeria, telling her that she was leaving the Chapter 5 Island to investigate her link with Pandora's box. All four rappers headlined a concert in the "Remix: The Finale" finale event, after-which the Loopers, along with Hope and Jones, were transported to a Japan-inspired Island. A mysterious artifact followed them out of the wormhole and fell towards the Island's surface.	Fortnite Festival: Snoop Dogg; Ice Spice; Juice Wrld

=== Chapter 6 ===
Season	Period	Description	Collaborations
Season 1 ("鬼HUNTERS") (Note: Translates to "Demon HUNTERS")	December 2024 – February 2025	Japanese folklore themed. The movement was expanded to include parkour mechanics, such as wall kicks and roll landings. For a limited time, players could become Godzilla as other players had to fight him off. The artifact's impact on the surface reawakened the Island's long-dormant magic, activating portals that allowed demons to invade. Hope joined forces with Island natives and siblings Kendo and Jade to fend off the demons as she searched for the artifact with Jones. Jade ended up trapped in the demons' Spirit Realm due to a curse that was accidentally worsened by a mask made by her brother Daigo. Hope identified the artifact as part of the Zero Point, which was in the possession of a dark entity in the Spirit Realm. Kendo forged the Splinter Blades using artifact fragments, which ended up in Daigo's possession after several mishaps. To save Jade, Daigo defeated the demon leader Shogun X in a duel with the blades. A pool of gold was left behind, with Jade believing it would bring chaos to the Island.	Baymax (Big Hero 6); Godzilla, Kong, Mechagodzilla, and Mothra (Monsterverse); Peter B. Parker, Spider-Punk, Spider-Man Noir, and Doom 2099 (Marvel); Samael and Garog (Unreal Tournament 4); Lionel Messi; Mariah Carey; Plungerman and Skibidi Toilet (Skibidi Toilet); Johnny Silverhand and female V (Cyberpunk 2077); Fortnite Festival: Hatsune Miku; Kafka Hibino, Kikoru Shinomiya, and Reno Ichikawa (Kaiju No. 8); Ryomen Sukuna, Mahito, and Toji Fushiguro (Jujutsu Kaisen); Jake Sully and Neytiri (James Cameron's Avatar)
Season 2 ("Lawless")	February – May 2025	Crime/heist themed. Excess gold had leeched into the Island's landscape, plunging the once-tranquil Island into a gold rush as various criminals attempted to claim the riches for themselves, overrunning the Island's western side. A wolf baron named Fletcher Kane rose to power in the chaos and later imposed a 50% tax on all gold transactions, leading the outlaws to unite behind Midas and rob Kane of his gold. After saving Jade, Daigo became obsessed with finding the Zero Point shard and partnered with Kane to craft a new mask with his gold that allowed him to reactivate a destroyed portal and breach into the Spirit Realm. After Kane was defeated by the Loopers, Daigo entered the portal, where he was corrupted by the demon inside. Daigo's actions also attracted the attention of the Death Star, bringing it to the Island.	Sub-Zero, Scorpion, Kitana, and Raiden (Mortal Kombat); Spike Spiegel and Faye Valentine (Cowboy Bebop); Allen the Alien, Dupli-Kate, and Shrinking Rae (Invincible); Shohei Ohtani; Clix; Negan (The Walking Dead comics); Fortnite Festival: Sabrina Carpenter; Finn the Human, Jake the Dog, Princess Bubblegum, and Marceline the Vampire Queen (Adventure Time); The Undertaker and Cody Rhodes (WWE); Casey Jones, Krang, Bebop, and Rocksteady (Teenage Mutant Ninja Turtles); First Order Stormtrooper (Star Wars); Winter Soldier and Yelena Belova (Marvel)
Mini Season 1 (MS1) ("Galactic Battle")	May – June 2025	Star Wars themed mini-season, depicting a battle between the Rebellion and the Galactic Empire occurring on the Island. Due to being only a month long, this did not count as a regular season. In the season's final week, players could board a Star Destroyer to bomb the Island for a brief period. A Darth Vader NPC that used generative AI to recreate the voice of James Earl Jones was also introduced. Rebel forces found themselves overwhelmed by the Empire, giving Leia Organa little time to formulate a counteroffensive. In the "Death Star Sabotage" live event, Jones and Hope posed as a prisoner convoy to lead the Loopers onto the Death Star, where they disabled its systems to allow a bombing run by the Rebels. Emperor Palpatine attacked the group, but they were able to escape before the Death Star exploded. Debris from the explosion fell to the Island's surface and struck a Demon Portal, resulting in a shockwave.	Emperor Palpatine, General Grievous, Poe Dameron, Captain Phasma, Mace Windu, Jar Jar Binks (with Darth Jar Jar), and a Mandalorian Warrior (Star Wars)
Season 3 ("Super")	June – August 2025	Superhero themed. As a fully corrupted Daigo emerged from the destroyed Portal to wreak havoc on the Island, Superman joined Hope, Jones, and their allies to recruit several young characters that gained superpowers from the shockwave, training them at the newly-formed Supernova Academy to confront Daigo and recover the Shard. However, Daigo ransacked the Supernova Academy in a surprise attack, forcing the team to evacuate. In a live event, Daigo summoned his Kraken master to the Island, but was knocked out by it. The heroes banded together to fight the Kraken, ending with Superman severing a tentacle and sending it back to the Spirit Realm. Afterwards, Hope began having visions of a bug invasion of the Island as the tentacle started to rot. Prior to the battle, a large tomato head mysteriously appeared on the Island. (Note: As a result of the "Rocket Launch" live event during Fortnite OG Chapter 1 Season 4.) A Zero Build sub-game tailored towards mobile players called "Blitz Royale" was introduced, with matches that are intended to be completed within 5 minutes.	Robin (Tim Drake), Superman (David Corenswet), Mister Terrific, the Engineer, and Cyborg (DC Comics); Hank Hill (King of the Hill); Cleveland Brown (Family Guy); Bob Belcher (Bob's Burgers); Fortnite Festival: Bruno Mars; Son Heung-min; Pink Guards, Masked Officer (Squid Game); Mister Fantastic, Invisible Woman, Human Torch, and the Thing (The Fantastic Four: First Steps); Deadmau5
Season 4 ("Shock 'N Awesome")	August – November 2025	Bug invasion themed. The Kraken's severed tentacle attracted a swarm of bugs to the Island. To fend the bugs off, an organization known as the O.X.R. took force as the bugs took over the central area of the Island. Meanwhile, Hope, Jones, and a now-reformed Daigo realized that the bugs were being sent from the Spirit Realm and were after the Shard. To combat the bugs, the O.X.R. summoned the Megazord, who eradicated the Queen Bugs before the organization drove away the rest of the swarm. Daigo gave the Splinter Blades to Hope and Jones as part of their plan to invade the Spirit Realm and confront the dark presence inside.	Female Spartans (Halo); Mighty Morphin Power Rangers, Dino Megazord, and Lord Zedd (Power Rangers); Peacemaker (DC Universe); Kai Cenat; Front Man (Squid Game); Fortnite Festival: Murdoc Niccals, Russel Hobbs, Noodle, and 2-D (Gorillaz); The Scout (Deep Rock Galactic); Saitama, Genos, and Tatsumaki (One-Punch Man); Beavis and Butt-Head (Beavis and Butt-Head); Isaac (The Binding of Isaac); Mad Moxxi (Borderlands); Thomas Bangalter and Guy-Manuel de Homem-Christo (Daft Punk); MrSavage; Rumi, Mira, and Zoey (KPop Demon Hunters); Ares (Tron: Ares); Ghostface (Scream); Doja Cat; Jason Voorhees (Friday the 13th); Scooby-Doo, Shaggy Rogers, Velma Dinkley, Fred Jones, and Daphne Blake (Scooby-Doo); Art the Clown (Terrifier); The Grabber (The Black Phone); Huggy Wuggy (Poppy Playtime); Semibot (R.E.P.O); Wednesday Addams (Wednesday)
Mini Season 2 (MS2) ("The Simpsons")	November 2025	The Simpsons themed. After a failed attempt to close the portal to the Spirit Realm, Kang and Kodos abducted Hope and Jones and attempted to destroy the Dark Presence inside. However, it threw the spaceship (which broke off a Zero Point Shard in the process) into a wormhole that got diverted by Kang and Hope to a now-merged Island and Springfield. Meanwhile, Homer found the Zero Shard, smashed it into a TV remote, and used it to alter reality while Hope and Jones attempted to find him and the Shard. After causing food to rain from the sky, Homer discarded the shard in a vat at the power plant but fell in with it, creating a horde of Homer clones. Bart and Lisa managed to converge the clones into a single giant Homer, who Hope and Jones convinced to help fight the Dark Presence. Jones, Hope, and the players rifted back to the Chapter 6 island, which had been taken over by the Dark Presence. Jones summoned other characters from different realities, including the Bride, Huntrix, Superman, Giant Homer, Dino Megazord, the Mecha Strike Commander, Godzilla, and Kong, among others, and led them along with the players to fight the Dark Presence. It ended with Jones summoning a Red Cube, which the Mecha kicked into the Dark Presence, destroying it and releasing the Zero Point Shard. Shortly after this, the island was restored to how it was, with the characters going back to their own realities, and Hope, Jones, and the players going to the Chapter 7 island.	Homer Simpson, Marge Simpson, Bart Simpson, Lisa Simpson, Ned Flanders, Moe Szyslak, Krusty the Clown, Itchy and Scratchy, and Professor Frink (fused with Peely) (The Simpsons); Tyler, the Creator Vecna, Will Byers, Mike Wheeler, Lucas Sinclair, and Dustin Henderson (Stranger Things)

=== Chapter 7 ===
Season	Period	Description	Collaborations
Season 1 ("Pacific Break")	November 2025 – March 2026	Hollywood/US West Coast themed. Locations include POIs inspired by Area 51, San Francisco, Los Angeles, Las Vegas, and Disneyland. The storyline with the Seven, the Imagined Order, and the Last Reality continued as the Last Reality invaded the new Island, destroying the Battle Bus in the process. Due to this, players had to surf a wave in order to get to the Island. The Order, revealed to have escaped the Last Reality, crash-landed on the Island, leaving audio tapes behind. A corrupted variant of the Dark Voyager began collecting fragments of the Zero Point, and after the player freed the recently captured Order from her prison, a signal was sent out calling for the help of any members of the Seven still alive. A rift shortly began to form, through which arrived an alternate version of the Visitor from the reality of Fortnite OG, who arrived by rocket.	The Bride, Gogo Yubari, and Yuki Yubari (Kill Bill); Marty McFly, Doc Brown, and the DeLorean time machine (Back to the Future); Fortnite Festival: Lisa; Danny Phantom and Sam Manson (Danny Phantom); Kai, Jay, Zane and Cole (Lego Ninjago); Playboi Carti; Kim Kardashian; CouRageJD; Hogwarts themed outfits (Harry Potter); Ichigo Kurosaki, Rukia Kuchiki, Orihime Inoue, and Uryu Ishida (Bleach); SpongeBob SquarePants and DoodleBob (SpongeBob SquarePants); Batman (Terry McGinnis) and The Joker (Batman Beyond); IShowSpeed; Vincent Vega and Jules Winnfield (Pulp Fiction); Eric Cartman, Kyle Broflovski, Stan Marsh, Kenny McCormick, Butters Stotch and Towelie (South Park); Fionna the Human, Cake the Cat, The Ice King, The Earl of Lemongrab (Adventure Time); Kizuna AI; Michael Scott, Dwight Schrute (The Office); Ed (Ed, Edd, n Eddy); Mordecai, Rigby, and Skips (Regular Show); Fortnite Festival: Chappell Roan; Jinu (KPop Demon Hunters); Magik and Luna Snow (Marvel Comics); Sung Jinwoo, Cha Hae-in, and Igris (Solo Leveling); Black Dino Ranger and White Dino Ranger (Power Rangers: Dino Thunder); Grace Ashcroft (Resident Evil: Requiem); Peppermint Butler (Adventure Time); Blade and Kafka (Honkai: Star Rail); Pickle Rick and Rick Prime (Rick and Morty); Tom Lizard (Pixar's Hoppers); Hoshimachi Suisei;
Season 2 ("Showdown")	March – June 2026	Rivalry themed. The Ice King returned alongside the Seven, and it was revealed that the Foundation was frozen in a block of ice, alongside the Prisoner, Orelia and Captain America, during a trailer that parodied Avengers: Doomsday. Upon logging in for the first time, players could choose to side with Team Foundation or Team Ice King, each with a bonus style, with the style for the winning team unlocking for all Battle Pass owners at the end of the season. A mechanic called Rivalries was introduced, where after a player interacted with a Rivalry Board, a random player would become their rival, and when one got eliminated, the other would earn a currency called Rivalry Credits. The Dark Voyager was revealed to be reassembling the Zero Point for unknown reasons, and had partnered up with the Ice King. Meanwhile, the Foundation escaped the Ice King's castle and reunited with the Order, the Visitor, Jones, and Hope in order to fight back. The Dark Voyager appeared in the Elite Stronghold Reload map and took the shard there, despite the Elites' efforts to fight him off. In the "Shattered" live event, the Foundation and Ice King fought as the Dark Voyager began reassembling the Zero Point. However, the Ice King overpowered and froze the Foundation (due to Team Ice King winning the rivalry). The Dark Voyager betrayed the Ice King and absorbed him before remaking the Island. Although the loopers were able to destroy the Dark Voyager's spacecraft, they were unaware of what was next for the Dark Voyager's plans. Meanwhile, the Visitor betrayed and severely wounded Jones, but not before revealing himself to be Geno - his former foe and the Dark Voyager's true master.	Bugs Bunny, Daffy Duck and Lola Bunny (Looney Tunes); The Scouts (Peak); Kliff (Crimson Desert); Jon Snow, Daenerys Targaryen, the Night King, and Drogon (Game of Thrones); Hercules, Megara and Hades (Disney's Hercules); Dart Monkey (Bloons TD 6); Tung Tung Tung Sahur and Ballerina Cappucina (Italian brainrot); Perry the Platypus, Dr. Doofenshmirtz and Balloony (Phineas and Ferb); Adam Smasher (Cyberpunk 2077); Buzz Lightyear, Emperor Zurg and Aliens (Toy Story); Stone Cold Steve Austin and Liv Morgan (WWE); Sommerset, Reddysh and Moxie; Fortnite Festival: Laufey; The Traveler (Cronos: The New Dawn); Ben Tennyson and Gwen Tennyson (Ben 10); Lois Griffin (Family Guy); Linda Belcher (Bob's Burgers); Typical Gamer; Peggy Hill (King of the Hill); Tracer, Genji, D.Va, and Mercy (Overwatch);
Season 3 ("Runners")	June – August 2026	Sprite themed. Following the battle, the Dark Voyager took over the reshaped Island, while Geno, still posing as the Visitor, manipulated an unsuspecting Hope and the Order. Meanwhile, Dr. Slone arrived to the Island and managed to rescue Jones, who was placed into a healing tank to recover. Former IO operative Singularity also arrived to assist Slone, who officially joined the Seven as the "Innovation", while Hope joined as the "Prophecy". Players could collect sprites found across the Island to gain special buffs, and extract them in order to unlock them as customization for the "Guardian", a Sprite piloting a mech who joined the Seven. After Geno attempted to kill Jones by sabotaging the healing tank, Slone, Hope, and the Order secretly discovered his identity but were unable to do anything due to the Zero Point still being unstable. In the live event, Slone attempted to use a device she had built to stabilize the Zero Point. However, Geno hacked the device and used it to steal the Zero Point, replacing it with a giant video game cartridge.	TheBurntPeanut; He-Man, Skeletor, and She-Ra (Masters of the Universe); Vinícius Júnior; Pomni, Jax, Zooble, Bubble, Gummigoo, and Ribbit (The Amazing Digital Circus); John Rambo (Rambo); Space Beth and Snowball (Rick and Morty); Supergirl, Krypto, Lobo, and Ace the Bat-Hound (DC Comics); Olivia Rodrigo; Dave (Dave the Diver); Mongraal; Aisha (Neopets); Stan Smith, Francine Smith, and Klaus Heisler (American Dad!); Samurai Jack (Samurai Jack); Odysseus and Agamemnon (The Odyssey); David Beckham; Patrick Star (SpongeBob SquarePants); Fortnite Festival: Lil Tecca; Punisher (Marvel Comics); Addison Rae; Kisuke Urahara and Yoruichi Shihoin (Bleach); Ironmouse; Perlica (Arknights: Endfield); Fernet (Kernel Hearts);
Season 4 ("Override")	August – October 2026	Video game themed. Following the event, Geno created a massive device and began empowering it with dark energy, which ended up bringing Green Hill Zone to the Island. Jones recovered and, along with the rest of the Seven, began planning on how to defeat Geno. As they plotted to discover Geno's plan, Geno materialized a large treasure chest on the island, teasing a valuable prize inside. Players could access terminals around the map that would cause "Overrides", which would permanently add a modifier to the entire match such as increased speed or XP gain.	Sonic the Hedgehog, Miles "Tails" Prower, Knuckles the Echidna, Shadow the Hedgehog, Doctor Eggman and Metal Sonic (Sonic the Hedgehog); The Deer (99 Nights in the Forest); Tetrominoes (Tetris); Joker, Ann Takamaki, and Morgana (Persona 5); Mega Man, X, Zero, and Rush (Mega Man); Crash Bandicoot and Aku Aku (Crash Bandicoot); Spyro (Spyro); Jazz Jackrabbit (Jazz Jackrabbit); Sora, Riku, Kairi, and Roxas (Kingdom Hearts); Pac-Man, Inky, Blinky, Pinky, and Clyde (Pac-Man); Ghost, Summer, Shaggydog, Lady, Nymeria, and Grey Wind (Game of Thrones); Lil Wayne; Lucyna "Lucy" Kushinada (Cyberpunk: Edgerunners); Dylan Faden (Control Resonant); Madison Beer; Freddy Fazbear, Bonnie, Chica, and Foxy (Five Nights at Freddy’s); Slender Man; Freddy Krueger (Nightmare on Elm Street); Beetlejuice (Beetlejuice); Asta, Noelle Silva, and Yuno (Black Clover); Dek and Thia (Predator); The Knight (Hollow Knight); Yeat; Charlie Morningstar, Vaggi (Note: Referred to in game under the name "Vagatha", most likely due to censorship restrictions.), and Alastor (Hazbin Hotel); Jimothy; Nikki Freeman (Obsession); Jack the Clown and Hamikuma (Universal's Halloween Horror Nights); Lady Liberty (The Purge);
Mini Season ("Treasure Hunters")	November – December 2026	Pirate themed mini season set on a new Island. A masked man named Captain X invited Jones, Hope, the Straw Hats, and other pirate crews to a treasure hunt. Players could use weapons from One Piece, such as Luffy's Gum-Gum fruit and Zoro's swords, and receive treasures from chests consisting of cosmetics, including the extremely rare "Pirate Shop Access Token", which gave the entire Item Shop for free for 14 days, once in 2026 and another in 2027. While Epic did not state the reasons for adding the token, some outlets stated it was intended to retain players around the launch of Grand Theft Auto VI.	Monkey D. Luffy, Roronoa Zoro, Nami, Usopp, Sanji, Tony Tony Chopper, Nico Robin, Portgas D. Ace, and Buggy (One Piece); ASAP Rocky; Lil Uzi Vert; Fortnite Festival: Kasane Teto; Kiriko and Widowmaker (Overwatch)

== Special events ==
Non-gameplay related promotional events have included:

- EDM artist Marshmello held a virtual concert in the Pleasant Park location on February 2, 2019, across all game servers, estimated to have had over 10 million players watching it live.
- On December 14, a special preview of Star Wars: The Rise of Skywalker (2019) was released at the Risky Reels location, hosted by Geoff Keighley, with a special guest appearance by director J. J. Abrams, along with Ben Schwartz as FN-143, a Stormtrooper from the First Order, which also featured the character of Emperor Palpatine in a voice segment that was referred to in the film's opening crawl, which marked the start of the Star Wars collaboration event.
- Travis Scott performed a virtual "Astronomical" tour in support of his 2018 album Astroworld within Fortnite on multiple live concerts between April 23 and 25, 2020, including the premiere of a new song, "The Scotts", featuring Kid Cudi, who is one-half of the super-duo of the same name. The first performance on April 23 was estimated to have drawn over 12.3 million players to watch, while a total of 27.7 million unique viewers cumulatively watched the concerts. Along with these concerts, the event included new cosmetics based on Scott for in-game purchase. Scott also released Fortnite-inspired Cactus Jack products such as action figures and lunchboxes for the event.
- Diplo performed a live Major Lazer concert along with Jordan Fisher in the new "Party Royale" game mode on May 1, 2020, to test out that mode, while a multi-part concert by Dillon Francis, Steve Aoki, and Deadmau5 was held on May 8 to celebrate the full release of the "Party Royale" game mode.
- A trailer for Christopher Nolan's film Tenet (2020) was first shown in the "Party Royale" game mode before releasing to other digital services on May 21, 2020. In June 2020, Fortnite announced that it would livestream one of three Nolan films, Inception, Batman Begins, and The Prestige, depending on the region, through its "Movie Nite" event within "Party Royale". Epic Games partnered with Nolan and Warner Bros. to secure distribution rights in different languages and countries.
- BTS premiered their dance choreography music video for "Dynamite" in the "Party Royale" game mode on September 22, 2020. It also featured the Tropical Remix version of the song.
- J Balvin performed a live concert in the "Party Royale" game mode on October 31, 2020, premiering a new song titled "La Luz". Anyone who attended the concert could get a special J Balvin style for the Party Trooper outfit. The concert was recorded using extended reality (XR) technology.
- Epic launched a short animated film festival within the "Party Royale" mode in February 2021, called "Short Nite". It would later return in July 2021, then later as Creative experiences for both the entire festival and the individual short films in October 2021 as "Shortnitemares" and May 2022 during a limited time window for the latter two.
- Ariana Grande performed virtually as the headline act of the "Rift Tour" in August 2021.
- The Kid Laroi performed virtually at his concert "Wild Dreams" as a Creative experience in January 2023 during a limited time window.
- Metallica performed at their virtual concert "Fuel. Fire. Fury." as an UEFN experience on June 22 and 23, 2024, during six limited-time windows over the course of the two days, with a special "encore" showing from August 2 to 5. In addition to the concert, Metallica music and themed cosmetics were added across Battle Royale, Fortnite Festival, Rocket Racing and Lego Fortnite; a Metallica-themed weapon inspired by "Ride the Lightning" and a location based on the M72 World Tour were added to Battle Royale for a limited time.
- Disney livestreamed a segment of the 2024 D23 Entertainment Showcase in-game as a UEFN experience to announce upcoming collaborative content with Epic Games for Fortnite, which included the Marvel-themed "Absolute Doom" season for Battle Royale in addition to numerous other cosmetics from various Disney intellectual properties. According to Disney, 1.2 million players watched the event live. Those who attended received a Peelverine plush as an in-game cosmetic for free.
- Karol G performed in the "Karol G: MSB Fortnite" UEFN experience in August 2024, to promote the album Mañana Será Bonito and the Bichota Season mixtape. Those who attended received a Karol G-themed bass guitar for Fortnite Festival.
- The "Chapter 2 Remix" season in November 2024 kicked off with a live performance from Snoop Dogg and Ice Spice in New York City's Times Square inside the TSX Stage, which was simultaneously broadcast in Battle Royale and Zero Build. Eminem, who previously appeared as the headline act for the "Big Bang" event, along with Juice Wrld, joined Snoop Dogg and Ice Spice for the season's concert finale event at the end of the month. All four rappers were prominently featured throughout the season.
- The "Daft Punk Experience" launched In September 2025. Billed as the biggest Fortnite musical event so far, it was made in collaboration with Daft Life. The introductory sequence to the event, set to Daft Punk's 2013 song Contact was created by Epic Games and Magnopus in collaboration with Daft Punk's creative director Cédric Hervet; an official music video for "Contact" was released in November 2025 incorporating the visuals from this introductory sequence.
- With the launch of Chapter 7 in late November 2025, Epic Games and director Quentin Tarantino worked together to create The Lost Chapter: Yuki's Revenge, an eight-minute animated short film based on a cut scene from Tarantino's film Kill Bill: Volume 1. The short, which was animated in Unreal Engine 5 using Fortnite character models, sees Gogo Yubari's sister Yuki hunting down the Bride as revenge for her sister's death, with Uma Thurman reprising her role via motion capture technology. The short film first premiered at a special event held by Epic Games at the Vista Theater in Los Angeles on November 19. It was then released to the public via an in-game event on November 30.
