= Chapter 2 Remix =

2024 series of virtual concert events

- Virtual concert tour by Snoop Dogg, Eminem, Ice Spice, Juice Wrld
- Venue: Fortnite Battle Royale
- Start date: November 1, 2024
- End date: November 30, 2024
- No. of shows: 3

Chapter 2 Remix was a mini-season and series of virtual concerts held on the video game Fortnite Battle Royale in throughout November 2024. Remix served as a return to Fortnite during early Chapter 2 featuring hip-hop headlined by Snoop Dogg, Eminem, Ice Spice, and the late Juice Wrld.

== Background ==
Fortnite Chapter 2 was the second major phase of the popular online video game, Fortnite Battle Royale, and began in late-2019. One of the more popular seasons during this time was Season 2, which was themed around spies. Starting with Season 4 in 2020, Epic Games started leaning more into using collaborations such as theming an entire season around Marvel Comics characters. Fortnite has also been used as a platform for virtual concerts, with major headliners such as Marshmello in 2019, Travis Scott in 2020, and Ariana Grande in 2021.

Fortnite kept progressing through more seasons and chapters, with Chapter 4 ending with Season OG, a return to Fortnite during Chapter 1 in mid-2018. This lasted throughout November 2023 and came to an end with The Big Bang Event, which brought in a record total of 11.6 million concurrent players. As a result, Epic Games teased some form of OG returning in 2024. In April 2024, a roadmap for Fortnite and its various modes throughout the rest of 2024 was leaked online, confirming a return to Chapter 2 (specifically the first three seasons) in November.

== Summary ==
The season kicked off on November 1 with Remix: The Prelude, a live event and concert which concluded Chapter 5: Season 4. Held live in Times Square, various screens showcased a rift butterfly moving throughout the block towards TSX Broadway, where Ice Spice and Snoop Dogg performed live while players were given a video feed from New York. All viewers were then showcased a trailer featuring gameplay as well as the lineup of rappers, including Eminem and Juice Wrld.

Chapter 2 Remix returns the players to an alternate version of the Chapter 2: Season 2 map, featuring a similar loot pool and gameplay. However, newer additions such as tactical sprinting and sliding as well as a Zero Build mode remained. Remix features modified points of interest tailored to each rapper, such as The Doggpound, an alternate version of The Agency themed around Snoop Dogg. Not every location was available immediately, with Eminem's Spaghetti Grotto (themed after "Rap God" and Mom's Spaghetti) being added one week after and Ice Spice's Ice Isle (themed around "Oh Shhh...") added after two weeks. A final landmark dedicated to Juice Wrld (themed around "Lucid Dreams" and The Party Never Ends) appeared off the coast during the last ten days, with Juice Wrld overlooking the map from afar. Unlike Season OG, which covered the latter half of Chapter 1, Remix focuses heavily on Season 2 with some aspects of Season 3 being added towards the end. Standard cars that first appeared in late-Season 3 were added from the start (including a 1966 Cadillac Deville) as well as speedboats and later helicopters.

The season's battle pass, known as the remix pass, features recreations and mashups of skins prominent in early Chapter 2, including Chaos Director, 1-Ball, Undercover Skye, Meowdas, and Dynamo TNTina. The rappers each got two skins added (with an exception to Eminem, who only got one due to already having three), with a cell shaded Juice Wrld skin being available for free. Alongside Battle Royale, Fortnite Festival featured Snoop Dogg in its music pass.

The season concluded on November 30 with Remix: The Finale, another live concert that was held entirely within the game. Starting as a recreation of The Device, an event from Season 2, instead of a machine appearing a microphone rises from The Doggpound, with a giant Snoop Dogg reaching down to grab it and start the performance. One after another, each rapper performed two songs featuring a variety of visuals such as Eminem getting in a rap battle with a mech and Juice Wrld transforming the players into rift butterflies. Players were briefly showcased the upcoming Chapter 6 map before leading into downtime. The concert and season as a whole served as a tribute to the late Juice Wrld; after the event a music video made within Fortnite debuted his song "Empty Out Your Pockets".

Remix: The Finale was met with positive reception, bringing in a record total of over 14 million concurrent players, along with an encore performance happening the same day.

== Set Lists ==
Remix: The Prelude
Song Title	Artist
"In Ha Mood"	Ice Spice
"Princess Diana"	Ice Spice
"Who Am I"	Snoop Dogg
"Deep Cover"	Snoop Dogg ft. Dr. Dre
"Gorgeous"	Snoop Dogg ft. Jhené Aiko
"Drop It Like It's Hot"	Snoop Dogg
"The Next Episode"	Snoop Dogg ft. Dr. Dre

Remix: The Finale
Song Title	Artist
"Drop It Like It's Hot"	Snoop Dogg
"Another Part of Me"	Snoop Dogg ft. Dr. Dre and Sting
"The Monster"	Eminem ft. Rihanna
"Houdini"	Eminem
"In Ha Mood"	Ice Spice
"Oh Shhh..."	Ice Spice ft. Travis Scott
"Empty Out Your Pockets"	Juice Wrld
"Lucid Dreams"	Juice Wrld
