= Fortnite Festival =

2023 video game

- Developer: Harmonix
- Publisher: Epic Games
- Series: Fortnite
- Engine: Unreal Engine 5
- Platforms: Android; iOS; Nintendo Switch; Nintendo Switch 2; PlayStation 4; PlayStation 5; Windows; Xbox One; Xbox Series X/S
- Release: December 9, 2023
- Genre: Rhythm
- Modes: Single-player, multiplayer

Fortnite Festival is a 2023 rhythm game developed by Harmonix and published by Epic Games. In the game, players perform songs while attempting to achieve the highest score possible based on their performance. Each song features four different instruments, and players choose which instrument they want to play, as well as the song's difficulty; higher difficulties change the layout of the songs. A variety of songs can be chosen from, with a free selection that changes daily, as well as the opportunity to purchase songs outright from the Fortnite item shop. Songs range from those composed by Epic Games Sound Team to tracks from popular artists.

The game was released in December 2023 as part of the Fortnite launcher. It was released to mixed reviews from critics, who criticized the gameplay for being like other rhythm games, as well as the price of songs. Since release, many in-game "seasons" have been introduced, each themed around a specific featured artist or band. Other updates have also allowed the use of guitar controllers, microphones, and MIDI drum kits, adding new features designed with the controllers in mind, and allowing the game to be played similarly to Guitar Hero or Rock Band, which Harmonix also developed. A player versus player mode was also featured from June 2024 to April 2026.

== Gameplay ==
Gameplay of Fortnite Festival's "Main Stage" on expert difficulty

Fortnite Festival is a rhythm video game accessible via the Fortnite launcher. The game features two modes: the "Main Stage", and the "Jam Stage". In all modes, the players choose a song to play and the aspect of that song they want to perform. These options are drums, lead, bass, and vocals.

On the Main Stage, a group of 1-4 players will choose a selection of songs, attempting to time button inputs correctly to the notes of the current song. The players' scores and combo multipliers increase with accurate inputs. The player can choose one of four difficulty levels, ranging from easy to expert. While the other difficulties only use four button inputs for notes, the expert difficulty uses five. "Pro" options are available for all four instruments; however, Pro Vocals has had its name changed twice upon release. It originally switched from Pro Vocals to Mic Vocals, and after the mode had started gaining traction on social media, the game officially renamed it to Karaoke a few days later. Pro Lead and Bass take advantage of compatible guitar controllers and feature different song layouts, introducing hammer-on and pull-off notes. Similarly, Pro Drums uses compatible drum kit controllers or MIDI drum kits. Mic Vocals/Karaoke allows the player to sing the specific song by plugging in a compatible microphone.

After correctly playing specially marked sections of each track, the player is granted "Overdrive", an ability that the player can activate to increase both their own and their squad's overall current score multiplier. If several players activate "Overdrive" at the same time, the overall squad score multipliers stack, but individual multipliers aren't affected. This mode features online multiplayer on all platforms and local multiplayer on PlayStation and Xbox console versions, which was added to the game in January 2025. Global score leaderboards are available on a per-song, per-instrument basis, resetting each season, while all-time leaderboards were added in a February 2025 update.

In the Jam Stage, players can make mashups of several songs they've acquired, incorporating one of four instrument stems from each track, with the tempo and key of each track being adjustable. This mode has gameplay similar to Fuser, another game previously made by Harmonix. The versions of the songs used in this mode are known as "Jam Loops", and function as in-game emotes. These "Jam Loops" can also be used in Battle Royale, Creative, Unreal Editor for Fortnite (UEFN), and Lego Fortnite. Initially, this mode required up to four players to participate, each playing and modifying their contribution, and was expanded in April 2025 to allow single players to manipulate all four positions within the mashup.

From June 2024 to April 2026, Festival featured a third, player vs. player mode, known as the Battle Stage. 16 players are pitted against each other to play up to four randomly chosen songs in a battle to attain the highest score, with the lowest-scoring combatants being eliminated at the end of each song. Activating Overdrive in Battle Stage will allow players to target opponents with attacks to disrupt their scoring. At the end of the final song, the player with the highest score wins. The Battle Stage mode was removed on April 16, 2026.

=== Monetization and music selection ===
A variety of songs are featured in Fortnite Festival. These include ones from popular artists (e.g. Lady Gaga, Kendrick Lamar, Weezer), as well as original tracks composed by Harmonix and the Epic Games Sound Team. While a rotating selection of daily free songs is provided to the player, they also have the option to purchase a song with V-Bucks, Fortnite's in-game currency. Each song costs 500 V-Bucks, equivalent to $4.50. Songs are typically added to the game every week, with most weeks having three or more songs added. Some songs can temporarily be obtainable for free by completing challenges, like "Holiday" by Green Day, which was available in the summer of 2024. Due to the dynamic approach to the song library, the developers can add songs at any time, such as the release of three singles from Billie Eilish's album Hit Me Hard and Soft on the same day as its release in May 2024.

=== Seasons and collaborations ===
Fortnite Festival features in-game "seasons," which are themed around specific featured artists and adjust in-game material accordingly. Seasons use a battle pass system called the Music Pass (formerly the Festival Pass), which allows players to unlock additional songs and cosmetics based on the season's featured artist. For example, the Metallica season brought the songs "Nothing Else Matters" and "Enter Sandman" to the in-game shop, while "One" was initially exclusive to the Festival Pass. Additional collaborations include skins and instruments based on the Coachella music festival in April 2024, and a collaboration with Fender that brought the Fender Stratocaster and Precision Bass to the shop in March 2024. With the release of Season 6 in November 2024, the Festival Pass was rebranded as the Music Pass and made possible to level up in any Fortnite experience.

Season	Featured artist/band	Period
Season 1	The Weeknd	December 2023 – February 2024
Season 2	Lady Gaga	February 2024 – April 2024
Season 3	Billie Eilish	April 2024 – June 2024
Season 4	Metallica	June 2024 – August 2024
Season 5	Karol G	August 2024 – November 2024
Season 6	Snoop Dogg	November 2024 – January 2025
Season 7	Hatsune Miku	January 2025 – April 2025
Season 8	Sabrina Carpenter	April 2025 – June 2025
Season 9	Bruno Mars	June 2025 – August 2025
Season 10	Gorillaz	August 2025 – October 2025
Season 11	Mixtape (no featured artist)	October 2025 – November 2025
Season 12	Lisa	November 2025 – February 2026
Season 13	Chappell Roan	February 2026 – April 2026
Season 14	Laufey	April 2026 – July 2026
Season 15	Lil Tecca	July 2026 – November 2026
Season 16	Kasane Teto	November 2026 – January 2027

== Development and release ==
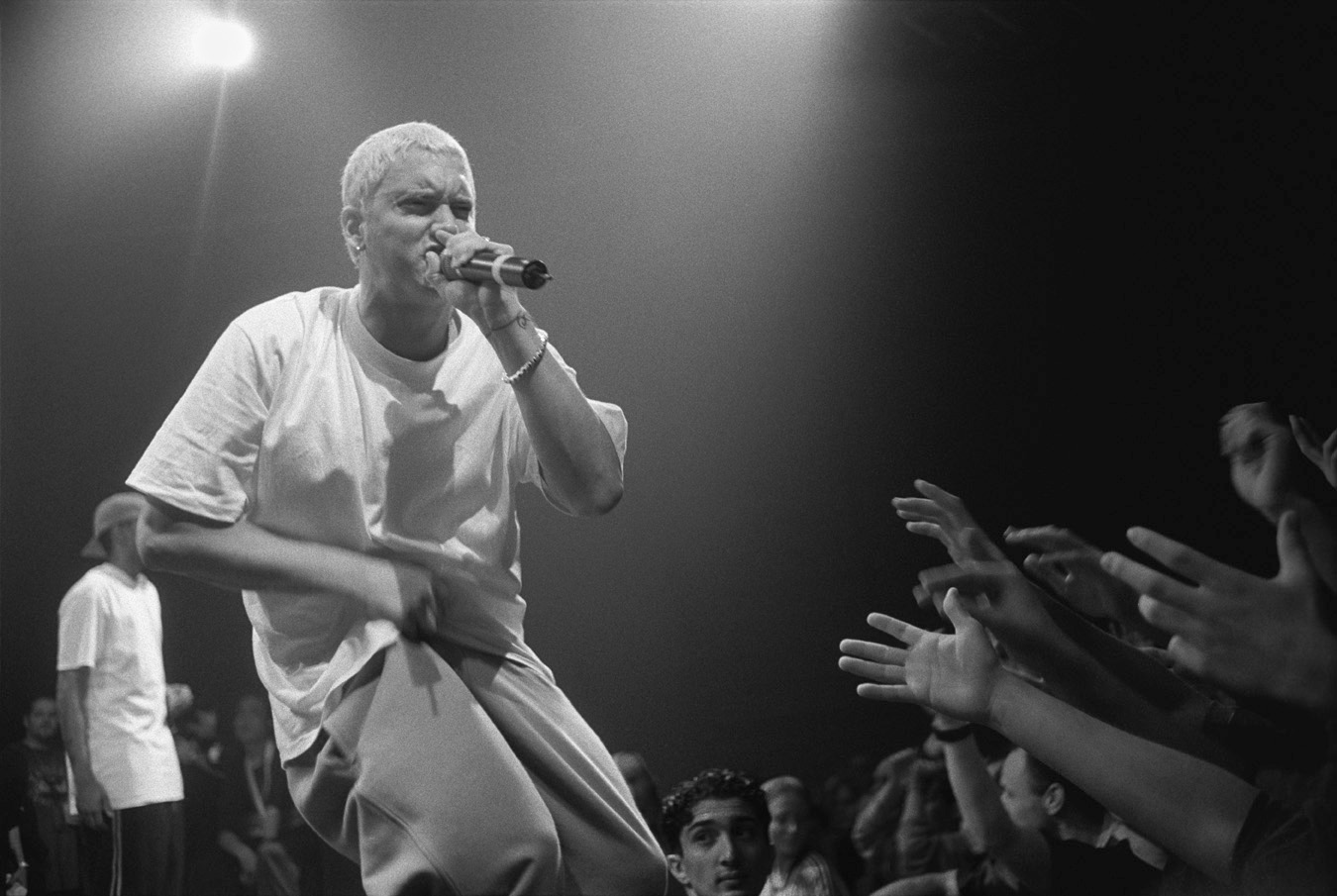
Fortnite Festival's gameplay was first revealed through an in-game concert starring Eminem (pictured).

Fortnite Festival is developed by Harmonix, the developers of the Rock Band series and the first few Guitar Hero games. The game was conceived as part of Epic's goal to expand the experiences within Fortnite, which included Lego Fortnite and Rocket Racing. According to Harmonix CEO Alex Rigopolous, their goal was to create a free-to-play rhythm game available to the millions of players of Fortnite, with songs freely available in a manner that allowed for dynamic and quick expansion to the in-game library, while also being favorable for music publishers in order to aid this. Alongside the Festival Stage and Jam Stage, Harmonix also developed the "Patchwork" system, which could be used within user-made Fortnite Creative experiences or in Unreal Editor for Fortnite (UEFN) applications to allow creators to incorporate dynamic music systems into their creations. Fortnite Festival was revealed on December 2, 2023, during an in-game Battle Royale event titled the "Big Bang." A part of the event featured Eminem performing "Lose Yourself" as an in-game concert, with players able to perform the notes of the song as the first reveal of Festival's gameplay.

Festival was released on December 9, being the last game to be added to Fortnite in 2023 after Lego Fortnite and Rocket Racing. It is available on the same platforms Fortnite is available on, those being Android, Nintendo Switch, PlayStation 4, PlayStation 5, Windows, Xbox One, and Xbox Series X/S. Support for plastic guitar controllers was confirmed to be in progress with the release of Festival. Performance Designed Products (PDP), which previously supplied instrument controllers compatible with Rock Band 4, announced a new controller for Festival in January 2024: the PDP Riffmaster. This was released in April 2024 and is available in two versions: one compatible with PlayStation consoles and another for Xbox consoles and PC. Both versions are also compatible with Rock Band 4, featuring the same button layout and basic mechanisms.

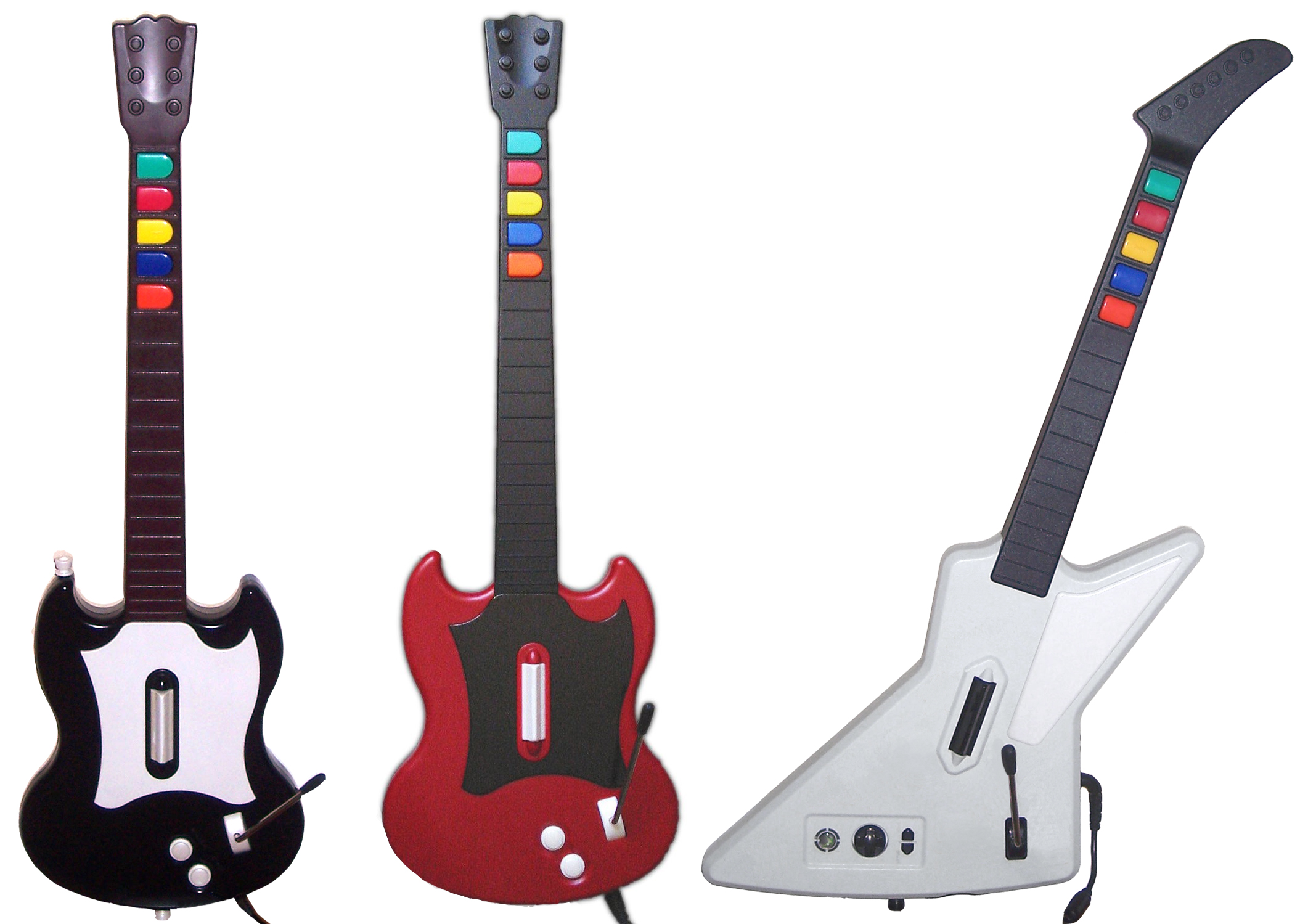
Since release, updates for Fortnite Festival have allowed use of guitar controllers, similar to the ones pictured.

With the start of Season 3 in late April 2024, Festival was updated to support the Riffmaster and a select few other guitar controllers, along with updating all past and future songs to include unique "Pro Lead" and "Pro Bass" parts that use the features of these controllers, similar to Rock Band. A May 2024 update later allowed players without guitar controllers to play these "Pro" tracks using standard controls. The Battle Stage was added in a June 2024 update, alongside Metallica content for the fourth season of Festival. On August 16, 2024, Fortnite Festival became playable on iOS devices in the European Union. In November 2024, peripheral maker CRKD announced a new attachment for their Neo S controllers, featuring five buttons that can be played as the note paths in Fortnite Festival - similar to the peripheral used in the Guitar Hero: On Tour spinoffs for the Nintendo DS. CRKD later started production of compatible Les Paul-inspired guitar controllers for release in June 2025 in collaboration with Gibson Guitars. Besides support for Fortnite Festival, Guitar Hero, and Rock Band, these controllers also come with support for open-source clones Clone Hero and YARG.

For the one-year anniversary of the game's release in December 2024, Harmonix made most of the songs in-game playable for free for one weekend, while also releasing new "Platinum" edition Fortnite outfits for The Weeknd, Lady Gaga, Billie Eilish, and Karol G. Local multiplayer was added to the game with the release of the game's seventh season in January 2025. In March 2025, an update to the Fortnite item shop made it where only a select few songs would be purchasable at a given moment, rather than almost every song being available as it was prior. It was also announced that the frequency of new songs being added to the game would be altered. To coincide with this change, the daily selection of songs playable for free was increased to over 40. This update was interpreted by many as taking advantage of players, giving them a "fear of missing out" (FOMO) whenever a song was in the item shop, as that song may not return for a while; on the Twitter post announcing this change, a Community Note stated that new item shop selections would miss over two-hundred songs at once. In March 2026, Epic Games announced that the Battle Stage would be shut down on April 16, 2026.

Enhanced modes for drums and vocals were added in Season 14 in April 2026. Pro drums require a Rock Band 4 or MIDI-compatible drum kit, requiring the player to hit proper drum pads, including optional cymbals, and bass drum kicks. The Mic Vocals require a microphone and require the player to match the pitch of the vocal track.

== Reception ==
Critics were divided on Festival's gameplay, with many pointing out it was like previous Harmonix games with few differences; PC Gamer's Mollie Taylor believed that some song charts were repurposed from previous games. Dustin Bailey of GamesRadar+ wrote that the game had a "winning formula," believing that it worked well like previous Harmonix games that had built up the formula for years. He stated that, while he found Lego Fortnite and Rocket Racing to have more content, Festival was the one that "captured [his] heart" and where he looked forward to future content the most. Conversely, Taylor described the game as "awfully barebones" compared to previous Harmonix games, believing there to be a lack of polish in certain areas, and found the game to be unenjoyable when playing an instrument that a song didn't use well. Nevertheless, she described the game as a "great introduction", though one that needed more work. IGN's Luke Reilly echoed similar thoughts to Taylor and Dustin, believing the lack of features from previous Harmonix games led to "isolating gameplay" that could make Fortnite players into rhythm game fans, but not vice versa.

Responses towards in-game monetization were negative. Taylor believed that, while the monetization was like other free-to-play games, it was still a turnoff. Reilly thought similarly, believing it to be a predatory practice when compared to the average price of music on iTunes and the cost of songs in Rock Band, describing Festival's pricing as "galling" when compared to the latter. Digital Trends' Giovanni Colantonio felt that the monetization practices left him questioning if Epic Games bought Harmonix to make money off of Fortnite cosmetics, instead of their prior experience in making rhythm games.

Reviewers were generally critical of the "Jam Stage" mode, with Reilly believing it to be a "waste of effort entirely" that was negatively affected by the price of in-game content. Dustin wrote that, while including a "light version" of Fuser stood out, it typically left him wanting to quit playing after a few minutes. Colantonio believed that the Jam Stage suffered from a lack of interactivity compared to the main game, as well as what he found to be the poor compatibility between songs. He wrote that the gameplay "[tended] to become an unmixed mess of tracks that don't fit together."
