= Lego Fortnite =

2023 video game

- Developer: Epic Games
- Publisher: Epic Games
- Series: Fortnite
- Engine: Unreal Engine 5
- Platforms: Android; Nintendo Switch; Nintendo Switch 2; PlayStation 4; PlayStation 5; Windows; Xbox One; Xbox Series X/S
- Release: December 7, 2023
- Genres: Survival, sandbox, social, obby, tycoon
- Modes: Single-player, multiplayer

Lego Fortnite is a collection of Lego-based game experiences within the Fortnite platform. It includes the open-world survival video game Lego Fortnite Odyssey and the action-adventure, social game Brick Life. The platform was developed and published by Epic Games in association with the Lego Group, and was first released on December 7, 2023, for Android, Nintendo Switch, PlayStation 4, PlayStation 5, Windows, Xbox One and Xbox Series X/S, and on June 5, 2025 for the Nintendo Switch 2. The games can be accessed on the Fortnite game platform.

== Gameplay ==
=== Lego Fortnite Odyssey ===
Before entering, the player can select the Lego Fortnite Odyssey game mode option while in the lobby. Upon doing so, the player's existing outfit, if compatible, will be converted into a minifigure. They can then select a world, with some options including turning on or off hunger, hostile mobs, and dying, as well as having the ability to invite up to eight players in a single world. After this is done, and the game has started, players can roam around the map and collect materials, such as wood, while also being able to build buildings and tools. They will also have to keep an eye out for enemy mobs, if this option was activated, such as spiders, wolves, bears, and skeletons. When dealt with damage, players can heal themselves by consuming items such as pumpkins, corn, eggs, raspberries, meat, etc. Fireflies will also appear from time to time and cannot be caught due to their speed. Instead, players can follow them, which will lead to them discovering chests and loot llamas, the latter of which will explode with items after being pet.

==== Fishing mechanics ====
With the introduction of the "Gone Fishin’" update in February 2024, Lego Fortnite Odyssey players can now engage in fishing activities to collect a diverse array of aquatic life. The update brings 15 different fish into the game, including Legendary variants. These fish can be found in various biomes and weather conditions.

To facilitate the fishing experience, several new tools and items were introduced, including the Fishing Rod, Food Processor, Bait Bucket and Spyglass. Players can craft different tiers of Fishing Rods and Bait Buckets, both ranging from common to legendary, using crafting benches and specific materials. The rarity of these items determines their effectiveness in fishing endeavors, with higher-tier rods and buckets offering improved performance and capabilities.

==== Driving mechanics ====
On March 26, 2024, an update called "Mechanical Mayhem" was released. The update allowed players to drive vehicles. Three vehicles were released: The Speeder, Offroader, and the Hauler. This let players build their own vehicles if they wanted by using the parts of the pre-made Lego builds (based off The Lego Group's iconic Lego sets). As of November 2026, Lego Fortnite Odyssey's vehicle build list is still growing.

== Development ==
On April 7, 2022, Epic Games announced that it had entered a partnership with The Lego Group, and while details were scarce, the two companies were working on creating a "metaverse" designed for younger audiences. As a result, Lego's parent company, Kirkbi A/S, invested US$1 billion into Epic Games.

A year later, on November 21, 2023, Lego uploaded a teaser to Twitter unveiling the Supply Llama from the game made of Lego bricks, thus confirming that the collaboration was underway.

Over 1,200 Fortnite outfits were converted into Lego minifigures during the game's original launch, with Epic Games confirming that more would be on the way by early 2024.

On December 20, 2023, YouTube personality MrBeast became the first person with an in-game Icon Series outfit to receive a Lego style, which was re-released on the Item Shop earlier that day.

On May 3, 2024, Fortnite added a Star Wars update, right before the annual Star Wars celebrations. This update affected Lego Fortnite too; the new Star Wars Island is home to a Rebel Village, which the player will repair and improve after the Empire crashes onto their island.

=== Lego Islands Partnership ===
At the 2024 GDC, Epic Games and The Lego Group unveiled plans for Fortnite creators to use Lego elements, Lego Styles, and other Lego Brand assets in Unreal Editor for Fortnite (UEFN) and Fortnite Creative. This integration enables creators to publish their own Lego Islands, fostering creativity and imagination among players of all ages. To ensure a safe gaming environment, all published Lego Islands must adhere to strict guidelines, including ESRB ratings of E10+ for accessibility in the United States and PEGI ratings of 7 for accessibility in most of Europe. All Lego Islands use Epic Games' parental controls and safety features to safeguard players of all ages.

=== Brick Life and rebranding ===
Epic announced Brick Life, an age-appropriate social life roleplay game that has similar play elements to the Grand Theft Auto series, to be released on the Fortnite platform on December 12, 2024. As part of this, the main Lego Fortnite game will become a hub for both the original survival game and Brick Life along with future Lego-based games, while the survival and creative mode was renamed Lego Fortnite Odyssey.

=== Lego Expeditions ===
A third mode, Lego Expeditions, was a limited time gamemode introduced on June 18, 2025. It is a cooperative action-adventure mode for up to 4 players, with each player selecting a character belonging to one hero class with special abilities. The players team up to fight computer opponents and solve puzzles. Lego Expeditions is no longer a gamemode in Fortnite.

== Release ==
The preview for Lego Fortnite Odyssey was first revealed during The Big Bang event on December 2, 2023, through the following day, alongside two other then-upcoming game modes, Rocket Racing and Fortnite Festival, with the game being released on December 7, 2023, for most platforms supported on the base game.

Upon launch, the game reached over 2.4 million concurrent users, temporarily becoming the most popular game mode, surpassing the player counts of Battle Royale, Rocket Racing, Fortnite Festival, and Save the World.

== Reception ==
Reception

Review scores
| Publication | Score |
|---|---|
| IGN | 7/10 |
| TechRadar | 3/5 |
| Gamereactor | 8/10 |

The game has received generally positive reviews from critics; however, it has drawn heavy comparisons to Minecraft, another sandbox game which involves crafting items.

Phil Hornshaw of IGN gave it a rating of 7/10, saying that there was "a solid foundation here that developer Epic Games will surely build on over time" and noted that it felt "somewhat empty at launch", and went on by addressing its "thin" building aspects and lack of any real goals.

James Herd of Destructoid also brought up the game's target audience, believing that the mode was made to circumvent some concern over the other pre-existing modes' violence.

== See also ==
- Lego Universe, a discontinued Lego MMORPG.
