= Loserfruit =

Australian Twitch streamer (born 1993)

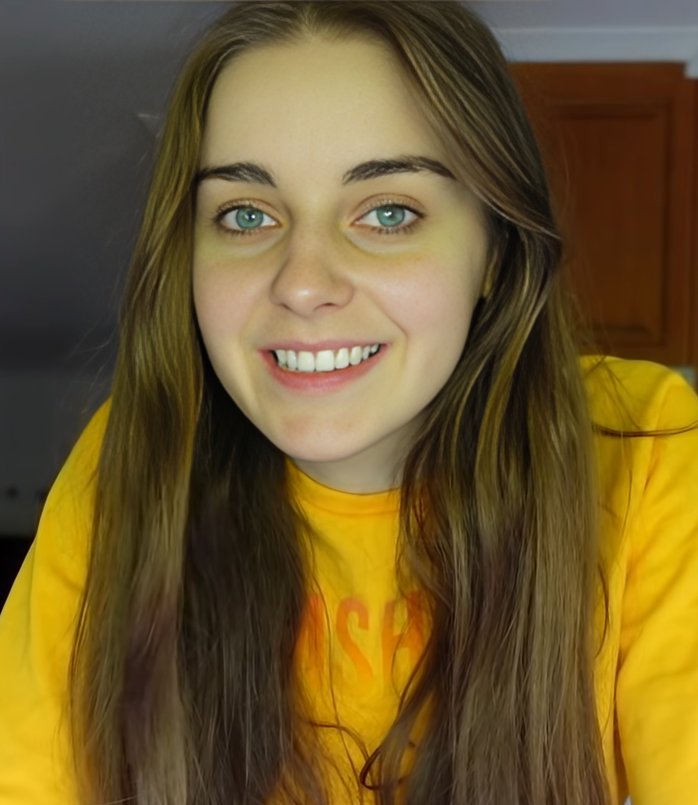
- Belsten in 2021
- Born: Kathleen Belsten; 1992 or 1993; Melbourne, Victoria, Australia
- Other names: Lufu; Fruity
- Occupations: Live streamer; YouTuber
- Years active: 2013–present

Twitch information
- Channel: Loserfruit
- Genre: Gaming
- Games: Fortnite; Overwatch; League of Legends; Among Us
- Followers: 3 million

YouTube information
- Channel: Loserfruit
- Years active: 2016-present
- Genres: Let's Play; vlog
- Subscribers: 5.72 million
- Views: 2.90 billion
- Last updated: 20 June 2026

Kathleen Belsten (born 1992 or 1993), better known by her pseudonyms Loserfruit, Fruity, and Lufu, is an Australian Twitch live streamer, YouTuber, professional gamer, and internet personality. She posts Let's Play Fortnite gaming videos on her main YouTube channel Loserfruit, vlogs on her second channel Lufu, additional Fortnite Creative gaming videos on her third channel Loserfruit Daily, and other gaming content on her Loserfruit2 channel. Her main YouTube channel has 5.63 million subscribers, while her vlog channel Lufu has 800 thousand subscribers. She was also the co-host of the All In podcast, alongside fellow streamer and Click hoHse member Crayator.

== Early life ==
Belsten is from Melbourne. At school, she hid her hobby of playing video games.

== Career ==
Belsten started her YouTube channel "Loserfruit" in 2013 and initially started posting League of Legends videos. During the start of her YouTube career, she started making satirical videos on League of Legends, often with a comedic aspect. She then moved to Overwatch before moving to more Fortnite-based content in the end of 2017.

Belsten specializes in the Fortnite Battle Royale game and its variants, and was the second streamer to receive their own Fortnite outfit as part of the Fortnite Icon Series, after Ninja. She was one of the leading streamers to compete in the inaugural Fortnite Summer Smash tournament to be hosted at the Australian Open in 2019, and attended the second edition in 2020 as well. Belsten is sponsored by the elf cosmetics brand and the Gymshark fitness apparel brand.

Belsten was a member of Click, a since-disbanded group of Australian YouTubers who collaborated on videos that also included LazarBeam, Muselk, Crayator, Bazza Gazza, and Tannar. She led a 36 hour-long charity stream in January 2020 with Crayator and Fasffy that raised just over A$318,000 for the Australian bushfire relief effort, in which many other members and friends of Click also participated. She was ranked number four on Complex Networks' "The Best Fortnite Creator Skins".
