= Mom's Spaghetti =

Restaurant in Michigan

- Location within Wayne County, Michigan Location within Michigan Location within the United States

Restaurant information
- Established: September 29, 2021
- Owners: Shady Records; Union Joints
- Managers: Curt Catallo; Ann Stevenson; Erich Lines
- Food type: Spaghetti
- Location: 2131 Woodward Ave, Detroit, Michigan, 48201, United States
- Coordinates: 42.3380°N 83.0518°W
- Other locations: Traveling pop-ups
- Website: momsspaghetti.com

Mom's Spaghetti is a restaurant and food brand created by American rapper Eminem. The concept originated from a line in his 2002 single "Lose Yourself" and first appeared as a series of pop-ups before the launch of a permanent location in Detroit, Michigan, in September 2021. The restaurant serves a small menu centered around spaghetti, including plain spaghetti, spaghetti with meatballs, and a spaghetti sandwich. Following the restaurant's opening in Detroit, Mom's Spaghetti continued opening pop-ups in cities including Los Angeles, New York City, and Riyadh. Reception to the restaurant was positive-to-mixed.

== History ==
=== 2017–2020: Pop-ups ===
Mom's Spaghetti's concept is based on a line from his 2002 single "Lose Yourself" that says: "His palms are sweaty/knees weak, arms are heavy/There's vomit on his sweater already/mom's spaghetti." The restaurant's logo features a "tattoo-inspired signage of a heart and a fork wrapped by a banner" that says its name. Before a brick-and-mortar location was established, Eminem partnered with the restaurant group Union Joints to launch a series of Mom's Spaghetti pop-ups in 2017 to promote his album Revival. One of them was at The Shelter. Union Joints is owned by Curt Catallo, his wife Ann Stevenson, and managing partner Erich Lines.

In 2018, a Mom's Spaghetti stand was set up at Coachella. Stands were also seen at Firefly Music Festival and Governors Ball Music Festival. In April 2020, during the COVID-19 pandemic, Shady Records and Union Joints partnered to deliver Mom's Spaghetti to workers and people administering vaccinations at the TCF Center in Detroit. According to Eminem's manager Paul Rosenberg, the previous pop-ups were meant as a test to determine if Mom's Spaghetti would be successful.

=== 2021–2022: Detroit restaurant and additional pop-ups ===
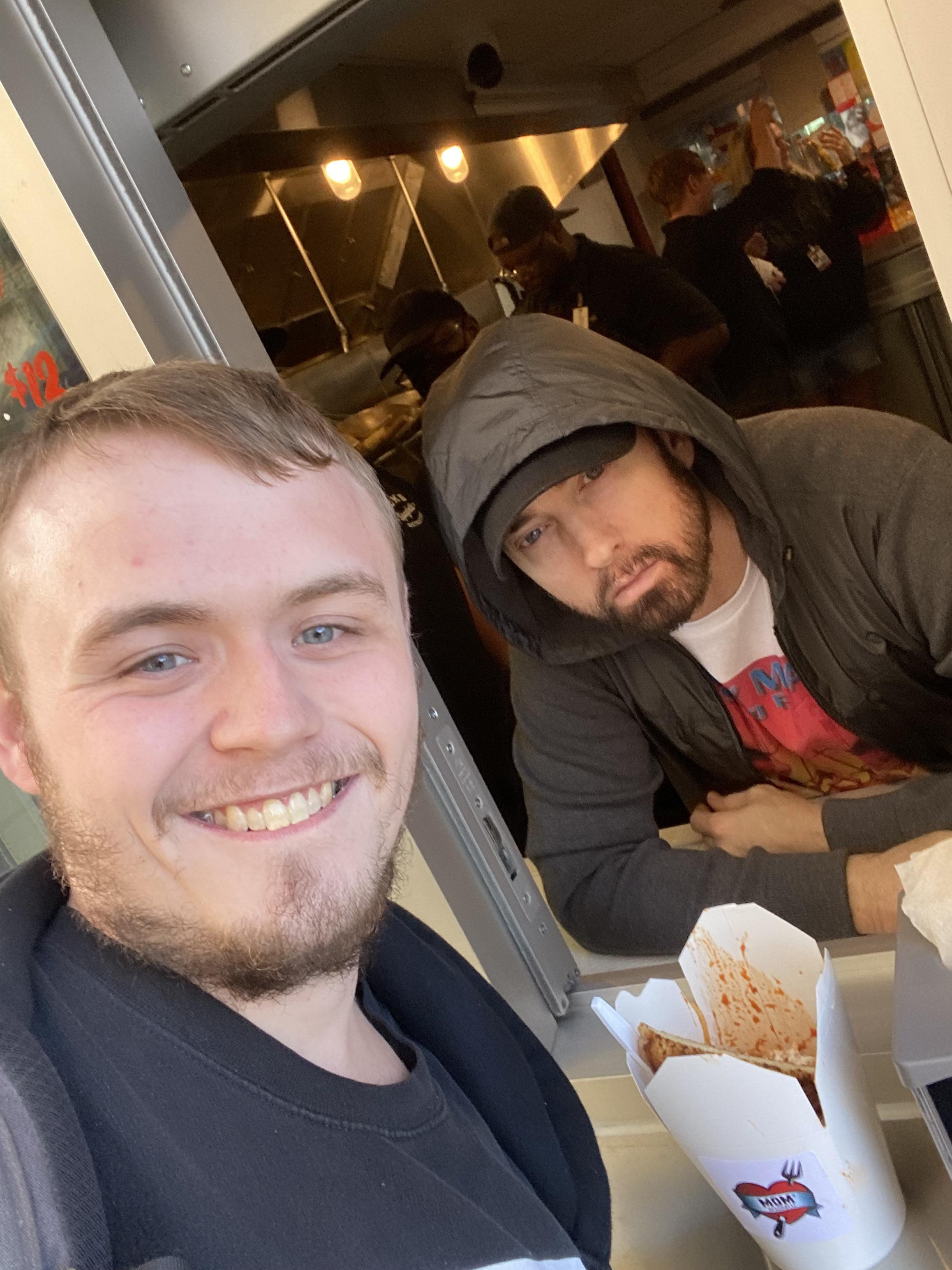
Eminem with a fan at the opening of Mom's Spaghetti in 2021

On September 27, 2021, Eminem uploaded a 30-second advertisement promoting Mom's Spaghetti on his YouTube channel. It was previously aired twice at the 9 AM hour on WXYZ-TV, one of Detroit's main television stations, three days earlier. A telephone number ((313)-888-8388) flashed on the bottom of the screen, which, when called, added that there would be a merchandise store on the restaurant's second floor.

Eminem officially opened the restaurant at 5 PM on September 29, 2021. He made a surprise appearance, as he personally served the first ten customers himself. The first fans lined up at around 10 am, seven hours prior to the restaurant's opening. The restaurant also featured its own merchandise, along with Eminem's limited-edition items and other memorabilia.

A temporary Mom's Spaghetti location at 820 S. Spring St. was opened in Los Angeles for Super Bowl LVI, from February 9 to 13. With restaurant Uncle Paulie's Deli temporarily replaced, it was a collaboration with the delivery company Postmates, which delivered orders in the LA area. From November 10 to 20, 2022, a New York City pop-up, in a collaboration with Shopify, was opened to celebrate the twentieth anniversary of 8 Mile, which Eminem starred in. The pop-up also contained recreations of areas from the movie.

=== 2023–present: Continued promotion ===
During Eminem's collaboration with the online video game Fortnite in late 2023, a Mom's Spaghetti cosmetic item was available. In addition, another Fortnite collaboration added a location inspired by the restaurant, complete with new cosmetic items and a themed weapon. During the game's Chapter 2 Remix in November 2024, a mission was added to battle an NPC of Eminem before accessing the Mom's Spaghetti building.

Mom's Spaghetti has continued to appear internationally through temporary pop-ups, including a December 2024 installation in Riyadh, Saudi Arabia, where the brand operated from December 12–14 during the MDLBeast Soundstorm and featured exclusive Arabic-language merchandise. In October 2025, comedian Adam Sandler gave a shoutout to the restaurant "for the great food" after meeting with Eminem in Detroit, as special guest Kevin James wore a Mom's Spaghetti sweatshirt. Eminem had appeared in Sandler's film Happy Gilmore 2 (2025) prior to that.

== Menu ==
At the restaurant's opening, Mom's Spaghetti consisted of three items, including a plate of Mom's Spaghetti (with or without meatballs), individual meatballs, and the 'Sghetti Sandwich, in which the latter piles spaghetti and slices of mozzarella between two slices of garlic toast; the meal is considered to be Eminem's favorite and was inspired by a dish from his childhood. Vegan meatballs are also served, and beverages include Pepsi products and water. As of 2026, bolognese (along with its sandwich) has been added to the menu.

The noodles are cooked to a medium texture, with a tangy sauce, hint of basil, parmesan, a pronounced garlic flavor, and relatively low saltiness. Mom's Spaghetti typically serves a large portion in a Chinese takeout-style container, accompanied by a plastic fork and garlic toast. The Union Joints developed the recipe for Mom's Spaghetti. Catallo stated that while it's not the traditional kind, it is the "spaghetti you'd know if your mom came to Michigan on a bus".

=== Pasta sauce ===
Logo of the sauce

On October 24, 2023, Eminem announced on Instagram that he was going to sell Mom's Spaghetti tomato sauce online. They were made available to pre-order on the 26th, with shipping expected on the 29th. It sold out within a few hours. It contains "ground tomatoes, tomato paste, onions, sugar, garlic, carrots, canola oil, 'spices,' sea salt, and red wine vinegar." A review by Mashed concluded that it had less calories, sodium, and fat than most popular sauces, but more sugar. The sauce later became a recurring promotional item through the brand’s Detroit storefront, where limited-edition jars were sold during special events.

== Reception ==
Upon its opening, Rosenberg said that the restaurant's response from fans were "overwhelmingly positive". Melody Baetens of The Detroit News gave a complimentary review of Mom's Spaghetti. While she noted that the dish was not as fresh as pasta from a traditional Italian restaurant, Baetens complimented that Union Joints developed a recipe to evoke its flavor and texture for reheating at home. She considered the restaurant's spaghetti sandwich as appealing, though messy.

Michigan Enjoyer reviewer Brendan Clarey gave a more mixed review in 2025. He stated that Mom's Spaghetti won't appeal to everyone due to its "trailer-park fare" and criticized its high pricing for a single item. He recommends people who are "counting carbs" to try "somewhere down the street", considering the restaurant's spaghetti sandwich "hot and hard to eat" and something "you might want after a rare Tigers loss and you need some comfort." Despite considering the food underwhelming, he complimented the restaurant's Eminem merchandise collection.

Online food critic Mr. ChimeTime gave a scathing review of Mom's Spaghetti in 2024, considering it to be the "worst restaurant in Detroit." He described the restaurant's spaghetti as reminding him of "middle school cafeteria meat" but described it as "better than this bullshit." He added that it was cold and that the sauce was the "blandest upper mid sauce" he had in a spaghetti.

=== Controversies ===
Shortly after its opening, Ypsilanti-based business Spa Day Spaghetti claimed to have designed the menu for Mom's Spaghetti and accused the restaurant of dropping them from the project and not giving them proper credit. They stated on Instagram that they were approached by Rosenberg ten months prior to its opening, only to be "ghosted" eight months later due to violating a non-disclosure agreement. Metro Times reported the accusation to be a hoax, as Mom's Spaghetti held pop-ups before their involvement.

On October 17, 2021, Cincinnati Bengals guard Jackson Carman vomited on the field during his team's game against the Detroit Lions. He seemingly claimed that the vomiting occurred after eating at Mom's Spaghetti, in which he did not recommend. The previous day, he tweeted by asking his followers for dining recommendations in Detroit.

On March 20, 2024, rapper Benzino, who was previously involved in a feud with Eminem, posted a video on his Instagram account where he picked up an item from Mom's Spaghetti and carried a promotional sign into a sprinter van. He tried the spaghetti before tossing the food to the ground in disgust. Benzino's diss track "Vulturis" was soundtracked in another post where he flips off the restaurant's logo.
