= Empty Out Your Pockets =

2024 song by Juice WRLD

Song by Juice Wrld

from the album The Party Never Ends 2.0
- Released: November 30, 2024
- Recorded: 2019
- Genre: Hip-hop
- Length: 2:15
- Label: Interscope
- Songwriters: Jarad Higgins; Nick Mira
- Producer: Nick Mira

"Empty Out Your Pockets" is a song by American rapper Juice Wrld, released posthumously on November 30, 2024. It is featured on the expanded edition of his fifth studio album, The Party Never Ends 2.0. The song was featured in Remix: The Finale, a virtual concert ending Chapter 2 Remix in Fortnite Battle Royale.

== Background and release ==
Following Juice WRLD's death in December 2019 by a drug overdose, his estate continued to release new material. In February 2023, his estate announced that his fifth studio album, The Party Never Ends, was in active development. The album was released on November 29, 2024, nearly five years after his death. "Empty Out Your Pockets" was added to the album's tracklist in the expanded edition, The Party Never Ends 2.0, released on November 30, 2024.

== Music video ==
The official music video for "Empty Out Your Pockets" premiered on YouTube on November 30, 2024, which was created using visuals from the video game, Fortnite Battle Royale.

== Charts ==
Weekly chart performance for "Empty Out Your Pockets"
Chart (2024–2025)	Peak position
Danish Hitlisten	3
Ö3 Austria Top 40	52
UK Singles (OCC)	55
UK Streaming Charts (OCC)	69
UK Video Streamer Charts (OCC)	14
UK Hip Hop and R&B Singles Chart (OCC)	6
US Billboard Hot 100	56
US Hot R&B/Hip-Hop Songs	11

== Certifications ==
Certifications for "Empty Out Your Pockets"
Region	Certification	Certified units/sales
Brazil (Pro-Música Brasil)	Gold	20,000^{‡}
^{‡} Sales+streaming figures based on certification alone.
