= Tilted Towers =

Fortnite location

- Fortnite location
- Tilted Towers in Chapter 1 of Fortnite Battle Royale
- First appearance: Fortnite Battle Royale: Chapter 1: Season 2 (2018)
- Last appearance: Fortnite OG: Chapter 1 Season 8 (2026)
- Created by: Epic Games
- Genre: Battle royale game

Tilted Towers is a location in the battle royale third-person shooter video game Fortnite Battle Royale. First introduced in a January 2018 update, it is a city composed of numerous destructible skyscrapers and streets. Located near the center of the map, and featuring the most loot out of any other location in the game, Tilted Towers was often the most popular location in Fortnite with many players going there during each game. It went through numerous iterations since its introduction in January 2018, sometimes being removed from the game entirely. As of October 2026, it is only present in the game's "Reload" game mode. Critics have had generally negative opinions on Tilted Towers, criticizing its popularity for causing disruptions in gameplay. It is widely considered the most iconic location in the game's history.

== Design ==
Tilted Towers was a small city location in Fortnite: Battle Royale, and a current location in the "Venture" map for Fortnite Reload. Located near the center of the map, the city is composed of several large skyscrapers with cramped interiors, each consisting of several stories, the tallest of which is a large clock tower. Due to their height, each building provided an advantage to players that are able to stay on their rooftops and had sniper rifles in their inventory against other players in the location. Buildings in Tilted Towers, however, per the mechanics of Fortnite: Battle Royale, are also destructible by anyone, with it being possible for the entire location to be flattened.

Alongside being near the center of the Battle Royale map, Tilted Towers has the most loot out of any other location in the game, and was consequently an incredibly popular destination, with many players each game landing at Tilted Towers. Combined with the location consisting of mostly skyscrapers that provided high ground against other players, combat in the location was often tense, and players are typically shot at from unpredictable locations outside of their field of view. Landing at Tilted Towers was considered to be risky due to its popularity, but rewarding as the location provided players with enough loot to reach the end of the game.

Several iterations of Tilted Towers have existed throughout the game's history. These iterations include Neo Tilted, a futuristic metropolis inspired by the setting of anime such as Akira (which took place in "Neo-Tokyo"); Tilted Town, a wild-west themed town where the building and breaking mechanics were disabled and the size of the location was slightly reduced; Salty Towers, a desert location that combined Tilted Towers with another Fortnite: Battle Royale location Salty Springs; and Tainted Towers, a version of Tilted Towers that had the surrounding area colored grey and some buildings consumed by an entity known as the "Chrome".

== Development and history ==
During development, Tilted Towers was designed by Epic Games to be on the "larger end of the scale" of locations on the Fortnite island, intentionally placed near the center of the map to increase player engagement. It was created to be similar to the existing city locations Pleasant Park and Retail Row. To increase player engagement, an abundance of in-game loot was placed in the location, with a developer describing it as "a place where many players could choose to land, and still be able to get enough weapons to be able to hold their own". In January 2018, Tilted Towers was added to the game in Season 2 alongside four other locations.

In March 2018, a meteor appeared in the sky above the Fortnite map, and players speculated that the meteor was going to strike Tilted Towers and destroy it. As the rumors spread, developers began teasing that the location would be destroyed, causing players to visit the location to see what was happening. However, in May 2018, an update to the map revealed a different location, Dusty Depot, had been destroyed by the meteor instead, though one building in Tilted was hit by a smaller stray comet. In May 2019, during Season 8, a volcano on the map erupted, destroying Tilted Towers in the process except for one single building. Later that month with the release of Season 9, Tilted Towers was reconstructed as Neo Tilted. During Season X, Neo Tilted was replaced twice, first by Tilted Town and later by Gotham City during a collaboration celebrating the 80th anniversary of Batman. At the end of Season X, the Fortnite map was consumed by a black hole, destroying Gotham City as well as the rest of the map, which was replaced by a new map at the start of Chapter 2.

In Chapter 2 Season 5, Tilted Towers returned in the form of Salty Towers, though was replaced by Boney Burbs the next season. In December 2021, Chapter 3 Season 1 released after the Chapter 2 island was flipped upside down in a live event, revealing a brand new map below it. Tilted Towers was on this new map, but was buried underneath snow until January of the next year, where it defrosted and made a full return to Fortnite after two years of absence. During Chapter 3 Season 2 in May 2022, an in-game war between in-game factions known as the "Imagined Order" and "The Seven" resulted in the destruction of several large buildings in Tilted Towers. These buildings were reconstructed by the Fortnite community via Fortnite Creative, where the players were able to design their own buildings to replace those destroyed by the in-game war, these entries could then be submitted to an in-game competition known as The Block 2.0, where players were able to vote on the buildings they would want to see put in the location.

At the end of Chapter 3 Season 4, the Fortnite island was invaded by an entity known as the Chrome, causing Tilted Towers to become Tainted Towers before the Chrome caused the destruction of both the Chapter 2 and 3 islands, including Tainted Towers, during the "Fracture" live event. In November 2023, Chapter 4 Season OG released, which brought back the original Fortnite map, including Tilted Towers, before the black hole that destroyed the map was brought back as well during the "Big Bang" live event. In June 2024, Tilted Towers returned as part of the games "Reload" mode, where it and other locations such as Retail Row are present on a map smaller than the one featured in Battle Royale. It also returned as part of the game's "OG" mode, a permanent aspect of the game that allows players to play on the game's original map, in January 2025. It is also playable through numerous recreations in Fortnite Creative.

== Reception and impact ==
Tilted Towers is known for being the most popular location in Fortnite: Battle Royale due to its abundance of loot attracting players, which subsequently led to it being the most dangerous location in the game; Ford James of Red Bull wrote that Tilted Towers was the worst location to land at in Fortnite: Battle Royale. Despite the criticism, Tilted Towers has been considered the most iconic location in Fortnite: Battle Royale; Austen Goslin of Polygon described it as the "most important" location in the game's history, writing that no other location was able to reach the "cultural consciousness" of Tilted Towers. According to PCGamesN, Salty Towers was the most popular location in Chapter 2 Season 5.

Critics had generally negative opinions on Tilted Towers, mainly criticizing its popularity making gameplay difficult. Upon its introduction, Cecilia D'Anastasio wrote in a Kotaku article that Tilted Towers was "evil", and designed to make the average player hate themselves, attributing her thoughts to her own skill and experience with the game itself. Christian Donlan of Eurogamer described landing at the location to be the equivalent of being put in a meat grinder, and criticized the location's popularity for making the gameplay of Fortnite "binary", viewing its popularity as being large enough to make the rest of the game's locations less interesting. He furthermore described the typical gameplay experience in the location to be repetitive as a result. Brett Makedonski of Destructoid shared similar thoughts as Donlan, writing that the popularity of the location caused gameplay to be disrupted by making the rest of the map "feel underpopulated". Contrarily, Goslin of Polygon described Tilted Towers as a "unique kind of experience" and one of the most fun locations in the game. During Season X, Goslin praised the wild-western version of the location, Tilted Town, describing fighting there to be a "great change of pace" due to the deactivation of the game's building mechanics.

When the location was at risk of being destroyed by the meteor, Donlan and Makedonski both wrote that the location deserved to be destroyed as a result of its problems, with Makedonski writing that if it were destroyed, that Fortnite would become a "better-balanced game". Upon the location's destruction later that year by the volcanic eruption, James Davenport of PC Gamer criticized Epic's decision to remove the location, writing that the decision along with the return of the game's "drum gun" drastically upset the game's balance. He described the location's destruction as one of the most "devastating" events in Fortnite: Battle Royale history.

During Chapter 4, Phil Owen of GameSpot compared Tilted Towers in Chapter 3 to a new location introduced in Chapter 4 known as Mega City. Owen criticized Tilted Towers gameplay in the "Zero Build" gamemode introduced in Chapter 3, which removed the game's building mechanics. He stated that the game was not designed for the gamemode due to its old design based around building, furthermore describing the location as "psychological torture". He viewed Mega City more positively in comparison, describing it as being a better-designed location than Tilted Towers.

A song on Ninjawerks, an album created by Fortnite streamer Ninja in collaboration with Alesso, was named after Tilted Towers. In September 2018, Tilted Towers was temporarily listed as a legitimate real-world location on Google Maps, sited at One World Trade Center. While the listing was up, several users left reviews of Tilted Towers from an in-universe perspective. The location was taken down by Google shortly afterwards.
