= Fortnite Marshmello concert =

2019 virtual concert

Party at Pleasant Park
- Virtual concert by Marshmello
- Venue: Fortnite Battle Royale (Pleasant Park)
- Associated album: Marshmello Fortnite Extended Set
- Date: February 2, 2019
- No. of shows: 2

On February 2, 2019, a virtual concert starring American DJ Marshmello was held inside of Fortnite Battle Royale. The concert, officially referred to as the "Party at Pleasant Park", consisted of eight songs from Marshmello's discography and was performed at the aforementioned in-game location. Released alongside the concert was an extended mix album, Marshmello Fortnite Extended Set, and a line of merchandise, the former of which topped the Billboard Top Dance/Electronic Albums chart and received the award for Top Dance/Electronic album at the 2020 Billboard Music Awards.

The concert was attended by over 10.7 million players, breaking the previous concurrent player record for the game, and led to an increase in Marshmello's popularity on social media and music streaming platforms. While it was not the first virtual concert held within a video game, it generated interest in the concept from the music industry. Since the concert, Fortnite has gone to hold several other in-game concerts, and other games have also held virtual concerts of their own.

== Background and promotion ==
The virtual concert was first announced on Marshmello's official website on January 30, 2019, where he advertised his next concert as taking place at Pleasant Park, an in-game Fortnite location. While Epic Games didn't make any official announcement on that day, the location was updated with an under-construction concert stage. On February 1, the concert was confirmed as happening the next day, and Marshmello was added to Fortnite as a in-game skin, alongside other cosmetics themed around him and his discography. The concert was officially referred to in-game as the "Party at Pleasant Park".

The concert took place on February 2 at 2:00 P.M. Eastern Standard Time. An encore took place twelve hours later. The show also coincided with a line of merchandise themed around the concert.

== Album ==
On February 2, Marshmello released the Marshmello Fortnite Extended Set, an extended mix of the Fortnite concert's set list and several other songs. In total, it contains 27 tracks. The album debuted at number 1 on the Billboard Top Dance/Electronic Albums chart, and 45 on the Billboard 200. On the year-end chart for Top Dance/Electronic Albums, the song was number 1. At the 2020 Billboard Music Awards, the album received the award for Top Dance/Electronic album.

== Reception ==
The concert was attended by over 10.7 million players, breaking the record for the most players being on Fortnite at once. After the show, Marshmello's popularity on streaming platforms and social media increased: his views and subscribers on YouTube went up by 500% and 1,800% respectively, he gained 147,000 new followers on Twitter (equivalent to an increase of 2,000%), and searches for his concerts on Songkick went up by 3,000%. Tim Ingham of Rolling Stone estimated that if just one percent of the show's attendees purchased its associated merchandise (specifically the hoodie), the show could have generated up to five million dollars in profit from that alone. The show also received positive reviews from writers of Kotaku and Rock Paper Shotgun.

== Impact ==
While the Marshmello concert was not the first virtual concert, its success led to an increased interest in virtual concerts within the music industry. Jay Castello of Rock Paper Shotgun believed that the show proved the potential of the concept of virtual concerts. The Fortnite platform would go on to host other virtual concerts by other artists after the Marshmello concert. The next concert held in the game was Travis Scott's "Astronomical", which took place on April 23, 2020, and outperformed the Marshmello concert, with over 12.3 million players witnessing the event. Astronomical was then followed by Ariana Grande's "Rift Tour" and other virtual concerts from Eminem, Metallica. Snoop Dogg, Ice Spice, and Juice Wrld over the years. Other platforms besides Fortnite have also gone on to host virtual concerts, such as Roblox and Minecraft.

== Set list ==
1. "Alone"
2. "Poppin'"
3. "Check This Out"
4. "Chasing Colors"
5. "Flashbacks"
6. "Everyday"
7. "Fly"
8. "Happier"
