= The Scotts =

2020 song by the Scotts

Single by the Scotts
- Released: April 24, 2020
- Recorded: 2019–2020
- Studio: H.O.M.E. (Los Angeles)
- Genre: Trap
- Length: 2:45
- Label: Epic; Cactus Jack; Wicked Awesome
- Songwriters: Jacques Webster; Scott Mescudi; David Biral; Denzel Baptiste; Oladipo Omishore; Patrick Reynolds; Mike Dean
- Producers: Take a Daytrip; Dot da Genius; Plain Pat

Travis Scott singles chronology
| "Turks" (2020) | "The Scotts" (2020) | "TKN" (2020) |

Kid Cudi singles chronology
| "Leader of the Delinquents" (2020) | "The Scotts" (2020) | "The Adventures of Moon Man & Slim Shady" (2020) |

"The Scotts" (stylized in all caps) is a song by American hip hop super-duo the Scotts, composed of rappers and singers Travis Scott and Kid Cudi. It was released in various formats, including on 7-inch vinyl, cassette and as a CD single through Epic, Cactus Jack, and Wicked Awesome on April 24, 2020. The song release was supported by four different visuals on YouTube.

The song debuted atop the Billboard Hot 100, for the chart dated May 9, 2020, becoming Scott's third US number-one single, following "Sicko Mode" and "Highest in the Room". For Cudi, it was his first US number-one single.

Both artists had previously collaborated on Scott's "Through the Late Night" and "Way Back" on Birds in the Trap Sing McKnight (2016), Cudi's "Baptized in Fire" on Passion, Pain & Demon Slayin' (2016), and Scott's "Stop Trying to Be God" on Astroworld (2018). In September 2021, Kid Cudi stated on Twitter that a full-length "The Scotts" album was in store for the future, though he noted that he did not know when it would happen only that it would at some point. He reiterated this in July 2023 following the release of Scott's fourth studio album Utopia, after previously stating in December 2022 that they were no longer working on the album as the moment had passed. Cudi was also featured on Utopia on the sixteenth track, “Looove”, while Scott was featured on two songs on Cudi's album Insano in early 2024. In August 2024, Cudi said that the album was not coming out, explaining that "that ship came and went".

== Background and promotion ==
On April 20, 2020, it was reported that Scott teamed up with Fortnite Battle Royale to start a virtual tour through the game called "Astronomical" starting on April 23 until April 25. The rapper would premiere and play a new song at several different times during the game. Players of the game got to hear snippets of the song before its official release. In total, the concert was witnessed by an audience of over 12 million players. On April 23, Scott revealed the cover art of the song on his Instagram and announced that the song would feature Kid Cudi. The song title is a reference to Scott's stage surname and Cudi's real first name, who inspired Scott to take the name in the first place. The cover art of the single was created by American artist Kaws.

== Critical reception ==
To Charles Holmes of Rolling Stone, the song felt "like a symbolic passing of the torch" after Scott's longstanding admiration for Cudi's work but eventually thought that "the results are mixed" despite having been "very hyped" beforehand. Rap-Up described the song as an "explosive banger" with Scott igniting "the two-minute track while Cudder keeps the fire burning".

== Chart performance ==
"The Scotts" debuted at number one the Billboard Hot 100 on the week of May 9, 2020. The song became Scott's 3rd number one single and Cudi's first. The song also made Scott the sixth artist in history to have multiple songs that debuted at number one following Mariah Carey, Britney Spears, Justin Bieber, Drake and Ariana Grande.

== Personnel ==
Credits adapted from Tidal.

- Jacques Webster (Travis Scott) – vocals, songwriting, composition, recording engineering, uncredited co-production
- Scott Mescudi (Kid Cudi) – vocals, songwriting, composition
- David Biral – songwriting, composition, production
- Denzel Baptiste – songwriting, composition, production
- Mike Dean – songwriting, composition, master engineering, mixing engineering, uncredited co-production
- Oladipo Omishore – songwriting, composition, production
- Patrick Reynolds – songwriting, composition, production
- Jimmy Cash – recording engineering
- Ali Adel - music video editing

== Charts ==
=== Weekly charts ===
| Chart (2020) | Peak position |
|---|---|
| Australia (ARIA) | 4 |
| Austria (Ö3 Austria Top 40) | 5 |
| Belgium (Ultratop 50 Flanders) | 29 |
| Belgium (Ultratop 50 Wallonia) | 29 |
| Canada Hot 100 (Billboard) | 1 |
| Czech Republic Singles Digital (ČNS IFPI) | 4 |
| Denmark (Tracklisten) | 5 |
| Estonia (Eesti Tipp-40) | 2 |
| Finland (Suomen virallinen lista) | 6 |
| France (SNEP) | 2 |
| Germany (Official German Charts) | 8 |
| Global 200 (Billboard) | 183 |
| Greece International (IFPI) | 1 |
| Hungary (Single Top 40) | 12 |
| Hungary (Stream Top 40) | 1 |
| Iceland (Tónlistinn) | 9 |
| Ireland (IRMA) | 2 |
| Italy (FIMI) | 2 |
| Lithuania (AGATA) | 2 |
| Malaysia (RIM) | 8 |
| Netherlands (Single Top 100) | 18 |
| New Zealand (Recorded Music NZ) | 2 |
| Norway (VG-lista) | 5 |
| Portugal (AFP) | 1 |
| Romania (Airplay 100) | 45 |
| Singapore (RIAS) | 13 |
| Slovakia Singles Digital (ČNS IFPI) | 2 |
| Spain (PROMUSICAE) | 21 |
| Sweden (Sverigetopplistan) | 8 |
| Switzerland (Schweizer Hitparade) | 3 |
| UK Singles (Official Charts) | 11 |
| US Billboard Hot 100 | 1 |
| US Hot R&B/Hip-Hop Songs (Billboard) | 1 |
| US Pop Airplay (Billboard) | 31 |
| US Rhythmic Airplay (Billboard) | 8 |
| US Rolling Stone Top 100 | 1 |

=== Year-end charts ===
| Chart (2020) | Position |
|---|---|
| Canada (Canadian Hot 100) | 77 |
| Hungary (Stream Top 40) | 43 |
| Switzerland (Schweizer Hitparade) | 95 |
| US Billboard Hot 100 | 86 |
| US Hot R&B/Hip-Hop Songs (Billboard) | 38 |
| US Rhythmic (Billboard) | 45 |

== Certifications ==
| Region | Certification | Certified units/sales |
|---|---|---|
| Australia (ARIA) | Gold | 35,000^{‡} |
| Austria (IFPI Austria) | Gold | 15,000^{‡} |
| Brazil (Pro-Música Brasil) | 2× Platinum | 80,000^{‡} |
| Canada (Music Canada) | 2× Platinum | 160,000^{‡} |
| Denmark (IFPI Danmark) | Gold | 45,000^{‡} |
| France (SNEP) | Platinum | 200,000^{‡} |
| Italy (FIMI) | Gold | 35,000^{‡} |
| Mexico (AMPROFON) | Gold | 30,000^{‡} |
| New Zealand (RMNZ) | Platinum | 30,000^{‡} |
| Poland (ZPAV) | Platinum | 20,000^{‡} |
| Portugal (AFP) | Platinum | 10,000^{‡} |
| Spain (Promusicae) | Gold | 30,000^{‡} |
| Switzerland (IFPI Switzerland) | Gold | 10,000^{‡} |
| United Kingdom (BPI) | Silver | 200,000^{‡} |
| United States (RIAA) | 3× Platinum | 3,000,000^{‡} |
Streaming
| Greece (IFPI Greece) | Platinum | 2,000,000^{†} |
^{‡} Sales+streaming figures based on certification alone.^{†} Streaming-only figures based on certification alone.

== Release history ==
| Region | Date | Format | Label | Ref. |
|---|---|---|---|---|
| Various | April 24, 2020 | Digital download; streaming; 7-inch single; 12-inch single; CD single; cassette single | Epic; Cactus Jack; Wicked Awesome | |

== See also ==
- List of Billboard Hot 100 number ones of 2020
