= Astronomical (Fortnite event) =

2020 Fortnite live event

- Date: April 23–25, 2020
- Venue: "Fortnite Battle Royale"

Astronomical was a digital live event in the online video game Fortnite, which was created through a partnership between American rapper Travis Scott and Epic Games, the owner of the game. The event took months to work on. It was marketed through game challenges and in-game locations.

The first show of Astronomical was hosted on April 23, 2020, which was scheduled to take place during the COVID-19 lockdowns. The set list included 5 songs: "Sicko Mode", "Stargazing", "Goosebumps", "Highest in the Room", "Like a Light", and "The Scotts", which debuted in the event. The last show happened on April 25, 2020. In different parts of the shows, players were able to float around a planet that was based on Astroworld or were submerged underwater. Astronomical grossed over USD$20 million with streamers praising the event. The live event attracted over 45 million players, with players citing it as a stress relief from the pandemic.

== Background and promotion ==
Travis Scott is an American rapper who sold more than 45 million records in the United States. Nominated for six Grammy Awards and having won one Billboard Music Award at the time, he released his third studio album Astroworld in 2018, which grossed more than USD$65 million. Fortnite is an online video game platform that was created in 2017 by Epic Games. With 250 million registered players in 2020, the game held the record for the highest number of active players in August 2018 with 78.3 million players.

In 2020, Scott partnered with Epic Games to host an in-game concert in Fortnite. Scott and Epic Games spent months on planning and coordinating the event virtually. Scott described it as an opportunity to "go to the max," creating things that physical venues and regulations would normally prevent, while Fortnite developers described it as a "one of a kind musical journey." To build "hype" for Astronomical, Epic Games decided to add in-game challenges, based around locations connected to the concert. On April 20, 2020, the company announced that Scott would become an "Icon Series" skin in the game. The next day, players were able to access Travis Scott-themed cosmetics, such as outfits, emotes, and other in-game items.

== Live event ==
The first show was hosted on April 23, 2020. The event was scheduled during widespread stay-at-home measures due to the COVID-19 lockdowns. Instead of a normal stage, the whole island was transformed into a performance space where a giant Travis Scott avatar walked across the ocean. For example, during the song "Highest in the Room," players were submerged underwater, ending the show with the players floating around a planet that was based on Astroworld. During the performance, Scott debuted a new track, "The Scotts", inside the game, officially releasing that same day. During the shows, Epic Games temporarily disabled player combat in the concert area to let the players focus on the experience. The final show concluded on April 25. Attending the concert unlocked two loading screens and the "Astroworld Cyclone Glider". According to Paper, Scott appeared to have been "motion captured."

== Reception ==
According to Epic Games, Astronomical drew in 12 millions players on opening night, setting "an all-time record" for an in-game event in the game's history. The live event attracted over 45 million total players across multiple showings. Many streamers such as Ninja, DrLupo, Myth, xQc, CouRage, and Pokimane streamed or reacted to the event and praised the experience. Many players cited the live event as a stress relief during quarantine. The live event reportedly earned Scott USD$20 million. On Scott's website, Astronomical merchandise had sold out, which included vinyls and clothing.

Josh West of GamesRadar+ stated that Astronomical was "spellbinding" due to the scale of the event's development and technicians from Fortnite working all from their home. West also called it the "most ambitious event in Fortnite's history." Writing for IGN, Stella Chung praised the event, stating that it "brought a unique musical experience." Will Gendron of Paper stated that the event was "worth it." Alice O'Connor of Rock Paper Shotgun stated it was "really quite cool."

== Set list ==
Set list adapted from IGN.

1. "Sicko Mode"
2. "Stargazing"
3. "Goosebumps"
4. "Highest in the Room"
5. "Like a Light"
6. "The Scotts"
