= Rocket Racing =

- Promotional artwork
- Developer: Psyonix
- Publisher: Epic Games
- Series: Fortnite
- Engine: Unreal Engine 5
- Platforms: Android; Nintendo Switch; Nintendo Switch 2; PlayStation 4; PlayStation 5; Windows; Xbox One; Xbox Series X/S
- Release: December 8, 2023
- Genre: Racing
- Mode: Multiplayer

Rocket Racing was a 2023 racing video game developed by Psyonix and published by Epic Games. It was a spin-off title to the 2015 game Rocket League and was a part of Fortnite as a whole. In the game, up to twelve players competed on a racetrack, with the goal being to be the first person to complete the race. Players could increase their "boost meter", which allowed them to gain a speed advantage against opponents, as well as jump over obstacles and drive on walls or ceilings.

The game was released on 8 December 2023 and could be accessed via the Fortnite launcher. Rocket Racing received positive reviews from critics, with praise directed towards its track design and gameplay, though some critics felt the game lacked content. The game was shut down on October 1, 2026 due to low player engagement.

== Gameplay ==
Gameplay of a player driving a car through a race track

Rocket Racing was a multiplayer racing game that was accessible via the Fortnite launcher. Up to twelve players competed on a racetrack, with the goal being to complete the race before anyone else while avoiding obstacles. Players could jump over some obstacles, or drive on the walls or ceilings of tunnels. If the player drifts at turns, their "boost meter" will increase, which will allow them to activate a temporary speed boost against other players. Unlike some other racing games, Rocket Racing featured no unique items or weapons that the player could be used against others to gain an advantage. Each track in the game was graded based on its difficulty, with the difficulties being Novice, Advanced, and Expert.

Players could unlock unique designs for their cars by completing certain objectives or through the main Fortnite battle pass. Certain designs could be purchased via the item shop with V-Bucks, the Fortnite in-game currency. Cars unlocked or purchased in Rocket Racing are compatible with Rocket League and are usable in that game. The same applies to some cars unlocked in that game.

While the game originally launched with seasons that featured unique tracks, challenges, and reward items, Epic stated that in October 2024, they would no longer be producing themed content, and instead focus on creating challenges around the game's ranked mode, while supporting maps made by creators.

In March 2026, Epic announced that Rocket Racing and all Fortnite Creator Made maps based on Rocket Racing would be discontinued in October 2026, though all vehicle-related customizations owned by players will still be available in other modes. The game's content tools were moved into the base toolset of the Unreal Editor for Fortnite in April 2026.

== Release and reception ==
Rocket Racing was released on December 8, 2023. The game received fairly positive reviews from critics upon release. GamesRadar+'s Dustin Bailey, Digital Trends' Giovanni Colantonio, and Polygon's Michael McWhertor all praised the game's track design and gameplay, with Bailey and Colantonio believing it to be one of the higher quality aspects of Fortnite, and the latter describing the game to be the "best proof of concept you could ask for." Gabriel Moss of IGN and Jake Green of TechRadar were more critical of the game, assigning it a 6/10 and a 3/5 respectively. Both believed that the game lacked content and failed to distinguish itself from other racing video games such as Mario Kart, while Green additionally criticized the prices of in-game cosmetics.
