= Rift Tour =

2021 virtual Ariana Grande concert event

- Promotional tour by Ariana Grande
- Promotional poster
- Venue: Fortnite Battle Royale
- Start date: August 6, 2021
- End date: August 8, 2021
- No. of shows: 5
- Website: rifttour.com

Ariana Grande concert chronology
- Sweetener World Tour (2019); Rift Tour (2021); The Eternal Sunshine Tour (2026)

The Rift Tour was a virtual concert event by Ariana Grande, held on the video game Fortnite Battle Royale. The show was played five times between August 6 and 8, 2021. Grande described the tour as "...an unforgettable, magical journey to new realities.” During the tour, players were able to purchase a skin of Grande and other cosmetic features inspired by the event to play as her in-game. Other artists, including Travis Scott and Marshmello previously held concerts in Fortnite as well, but Grande's was the first to tie in to multiple aspects of the game. Three minigames took place before the concert began, each with their own song: "Come & Go" by Juice Wrld and Marshmello, "Audio" by LSD, and "Victorious" by Wolfmother

== Setlist ==
The following songs were featured:

1. "Raindrops (An Angel Cried)"
2. "7 Rings"
3. "Be Alright"
4. "R.E.M."
5. "The Way"
6. "Positions"

== Event times ==
In order for people to see the event at a reasonable hour, there were five shows over the course of the weekend, each tailored to a different time zone.

Date	Time (UTC)	Region
August 6, 2021	22:00	The Americas
August 7, 2021	18:00	Global
August 8, 2021	04:00	Asia and Oceania
August 8, 2021	14:00	Europe and the Middle East
August 8, 2021	22:00	The Americas
