= Fortnite Creative =

2018 sandbox video game

- Promotional artwork
- Developer: Epic Games
- Publisher: Epic Games
- Composers: Rom Di Prisco; Pinar Toprak
- Series: Fortnite
- Engine: Unreal Engine 5 (Note: The game used Unreal Engine 4 before the release of Chapter 3 of Fortnite Battle Royale on December 5, 2021.)
- Platforms: Android; iOS; macOS; Nintendo Switch; PlayStation 4; Windows; Xbox One; Xbox Series X/S; PlayStation 5; Nintendo Switch 2
- Release: December 6, 2018 (Note: Release date for Android, iOS, macOS, Nintendo Switch, PlayStation 4, Windows, and Xbox One): Xbox Series X/S; November 10, 2020; PlayStation 5; November 12, 2020; Nintendo Switch 2; June 6, 2025
- Genre: Sandbox
- Modes: Single-player, multiplayer

Fortnite Creative, also known as Creative 1.0, is a sandbox game mode developed by Epic Games for Fortnite. It allows players to create worlds with Fortnite assets and publish those worlds into the Fortnite Metaverse. It was released on December 6, 2018, for Android, iOS, macOS, Nintendo Switch, PlayStation 4, Windows, and Xbox One, in November 2020 for PlayStation 5 and Xbox Series X/S, and on June 6, 2025 for Nintendo Switch 2.

== Gameplay ==
In the Creative "Hub", players use an in-game virtual console device to make new worlds or islands and join the islands by teleporting to them via entering the Rift portal beside the device. Up to four players can join a single hub, and the number of teleporter devices depends on the number of players in the Hub. This allows multiple players to edit creative worlds simultaneously.

A player building in Creative

In a Creative world, players can create structures on a "private island" or a baseplate and play them with up to 100 players (including the owner) for various multiplayer game modes with customizable rules. Players can edit the world using a "mobile phone" tool that their character holds in the hand. It allows them to place, copy and paste, move and erase objects, including ground tiles, items, buildings, and whatever asset is inside the in-game library. They can place objects from a palette with items of their choice, and can also choose to build from predetermined structures like buildings. There is an imposed limit to the amount of structures that can be placed on a world. This is done to ensure that every device that supports Fortnite is able to run the game smoothly. Each player has a limit of 50 private islands or worlds that they can own and build on. Creative allows the player to fly and toggle phasing through objects while editing. After a player finishes building a world, they can start a game session by pressing a Start button on the escape menu that starts the game. The players can then play their island in the way they built it to. After playing, the player can end the game session by pressing the End button in the escape menu. This causes the island to be reset to its original state before the game started.

Back in December 2018, Creative islands could previously be nominated to appear in The Block, a 25 × 25 tile area in Fortnite Battle Royale, which replaced Risky Reels in the top right corner of the map in Chapter 1 Season 7. In Chapter 1 Season 8, The Block was moved to the northwest of the map, replacing the motel. After 4 years, Fortnite announced The Block 2.0 during Fortnite Chapter 3 Season 2. This replaced Tilted Towers, which is in the center of the map, then, the winner was announced in Chapter 3 Season 3. Many players created their own versions of "The Block 2.0" in Creative. The Block no longer exists in Battle Royale.

== Development ==
During the development of Creative mode, Epic Games prioritized quick completion over creating a proper mode upon release. Because of this, there were many bugs present in the game upon release. Due to their focus on speed, Epic Games did not properly add every asset during the release. Epic Games was able to launch Fortnite Creative earlier than planned. Epic has updated creative mode several times since it was launched, fixing bugs, adding new buildings, and new island types. Fortnite Creative was eventually succeeded by UEFN, also known as Creative 2.0, which caused Epic Games to drastically reduce the amount of updates to Creative 1.0 due to the shift in focus. Creative now remains a somewhat buggy sandbox game, which only receives updates such as new items whenever new items or devices are added to Battle Royale.

While Epic has used Fortnite: Battle Royale to perform a number of promotional events, such as virtual concerts, Epic partnered with Time to create a special Fortnite Creative area dedicated to celebrating the 58th anniversary of Martin Luther King Jr.'s "I Have a Dream" speech on August 28, 2021. In August 2023, Epic approved a virtual holocaust museum designed by Luc Bernard; its release was delayed following concerns from the comments of Holocaust denier Nick Fuentes.

=== Unreal Editor for Fortnite ===
A revamped system of Fortnite Creative, known as Unreal Editor for Fortnite (UEFN), or colloquially as Creative 2.0, was initially ideated in a presentation during Christmas in 2020. Data miners found hints of code mentioning the system in early 2022. As quoted by Tim Sweeney, it combines the creation tools from Fortnite Creative with the Unreal Editor, such as custom props and models, animations, sounds, terrain generation, and much more complex mechanics that cannot be achieved in the simplicity of Fortnite Creative 1.0.

UEFN was originally planned to release by the end of 2022, but it was delayed until January 2023. On March 16, 2023, it was announced that UEFN would arrive on March 22, 2023, and be available from the Epic Games Store.

Epic and Unity Technologies announced a collaboration in November 2025 that will allow games developed within the Unity engine to be used within Fortnite, while Unity Technologies' cross-platform commerce platform will see Unreal Engine integration.

== Release and Reception ==
Creative was announced on December 5, 2018. A trailer was released and Epic Games partnered with nine YouTubers to create demonstration videos of the meta-game. Fortnite Battle Royale season 7 battle pass owners were able to play the game starting December 6. Players without a battle pass could join islands created by players with a battle pass. The meta-game was released for all players on December 13, 2018.

Fortnite Creative has been compared to the 2011 sandbox game Minecraft. Henry St Leger of TechRadar wrote that this Fortnite installment shies away from taking inspiration from the battle royale game PlayerUnknown's Battlegrounds towards taking inspiration from Minecraft and other sandbox builder games.

The meta-game was expected to keep a healthy player base for Fortnite. Polygon's Ben Kuchera wrote that the game is "a powerful new tool" and that "sharing your own maps and game modes, or just using the tools to create wild videos, is going to go a long way toward keeping Fortnite fresh for the foreseeable future."

Players have recreated various structures in Fortnite Creative; these include the Star Wars starship Millennium Falcon and Castle Black from Game of Thrones. Others have used musical tiles (which can be found inside of the Creative Inventory) to perform songs popular as Internet memes. Maps from other video games such as Counter-Strike and Call of Duty have also been recreated in the meta-game by players. Locations and plots from TV shows and movies such as survival drama television series Squid Game have been recreated in the Creative gamemode.

In September 2025, Epic Games added the ability for creators to sell in-game items via V-bucks from Creative maps, with developers of the Creative modes earning 100% of the revenue from these sales for the first year.

By 2026, Epic estimated that Creative modes, which includes games developed in UEFN, had about 40% of the total player engagement within Fortnite, in line with Epic Games' expectations.
