= Unreal Editor for Fortnite =

Game development studio

- Other names: UEFN, Creative 2.0
- Developer: Epic Games
- Release: March 2023
- Written in: Verse
- Engine: Unreal Engine 5
- Operating system: Windows
- Predecessor: Fortnite Creative
- Type: Game engine
- Website: dev.epicgames.com/community/fortnite/getting-started/uefn

Unreal Editor for Fortnite (UEFN) is a game development studio that was designed and developed by Epic Games, as an upgrade to Fortnite Creative. It integrates the functionalities of modern Unreal Editor versions with aspects of its predecessor Fortnite Creative. UEFN and also supports programming with Verse, giving creators the ability to build advanced games for Fortnite's Metaverse.

== Overview ==
UEFN has a GUI similar to that of Unreal Engine. It differs by allowing users to enter a live edit session, where game developers can playtest the project in Creative 1.0 simultaneously while editing via UEFN. Developers can use Creative 1.0's tools to move objects in the playtest and make simple changes, while also having the ability to live edit their game with UEFN, with changes being applied to the playtest in real time; changes made in the edit session by collaborators are automatically updated in UEFN, although changes made in UEFN must be pushed through the content service - a process that takes anywhere from thirty seconds, to several minutes depending on server availability and the hardware of the host. The most prominent feature is implementation of the Verse programming language to allow programming for players, objects, game logic, and the spatial environment. The addition of Verse gives Fortnite developers scripting ability, and has allowed for far more robust, advanced and unique experiences to be created in Fortnite. Verse is currently the only scripting method in UEFN. Amongst the Fortnite community, projects made with UEFN are referred to as 'Creative 2.0' while projects created in the original Creative gamemode are considered 'Creative 1.0'.

== Features ==
Many features in UEFN added capabilities for developers that were not possible or properly functional in Fortnite Creative. The ability to create games with complex systems and gameplay mechanics were not possible in Creative 1.0, due to incomplete systems such as it lacking any scripting language, inability to undo actions, and every other tool required to create complex working games or experiences. Creative 2.0 is the successor of Creative 1.0 that brings those tools to life, as well as additional Unreal Engine tools that increase the functionality and development standards of Fortnite Creative.

UEFN tools
Feature	Description
Verse	A programming language developed by Epic for scripting in UEFN. Communicates with UEFN via proprietary VS Code extension and language server. The extension automatically lints, parses, and interprets code as it is written and then built and deployed by UEFN. This is currently the only way to work with Verse.
Custom assets	Compatible filetypes include .FBX (with or without animated sequences), .obj, .png, .wav.
Sequencer	Multi-track linear media editor for creating and managing cinematic sequences, animations, and other scripted events. It provides a toolset for choreographing in-game events, cutscenes, and animations. It includes real time editing, event triggering, keyframe animation, camera control, scene management and animation blending.
Modelling	Interface to model custom 3D objects and their associated attributes.
Landscape	Tooling for painting and sculpting the spatial environment's landscape. Limited ability to edit and modify spline components.
Control Rig/IK Rig/IK Retargeter	Developers can edit and manipulate skeletal mesh animation solvers, and import or create rigs to be used for animating assets.
Outliner	Browser GUI to perform various actions with actors present in the project.
Details panel	Previously limited in Creative 1.0, UEFN has a details panel for every actor, where attributes can be edited.
L.O.D.	Referred to as L.O.D.s, UEFN has tooling for level of detail optimization by adjusting the complexity of 3D models based on their distance from the camera.
World partition	A tool for optimizing an experience by segmenting the data into layers or grids, to be streamed to the end user rather than being always spatially loaded.
Unreal revision control	Unreal Revision Control (URC) was implemented to support collaboration amongst teams. Teams are created through the Creator Portal (a web portal for creators to manage projects). Members of a team are then able to upload snapshots of a project for other team members to sync with their client. In a similar manner as other revision control systems, users check-out the assets being worked on and then check them back in when uploading their latest snapshot.
Gameplay cameras	Developers have access to several camera control devices that can dictate and manipulate the player's POV or can be fixed at a location or on an object. In late 2024 Epic released the first person camera device to be used after an experimental phase.
Material attributes	Unreal Engine Blueprint styled GUI for editing materials and textures with node parameters.
Output Log	A runtime status output and error reporting message log.
MetaHuman	A third party integration that features a suite of tools used to create and import fully rigged hyper realistic characters into UEFN.
Scene graph	The ability to child and parent components and actors to create a modular and exportable `scene` that can be manipulated via Verse, or brought over to a different project. As of January 2025 this feature is listed as experimental.

== Fortnite Discovery ==
In Fortnite, the Discovery is an in-game browser that allows players to search up published creator made games and play them. Each game in a Discover row consists of a thumbnail, title, and the current amount of players playing the experience. The algorithm works based on a mix of total clicks per view, player engagement, player retention, and the amount of V-Bucks users have spent after visiting a UGC experience. The addition of the public facing player count metric for each game was met with backlash from less popular developers, alleging that it makes it harder to build a player base when potential users browsing Discover see no players in an experience and thus negatively compounding algorithmic bias against them. Epic does this to allow better and high quality games to become more successful, however much exploiting from creators that make addictive and low-effort copied games that abuse the algorithm have ironically allowed low quality games to thrive and good games to be less or not successful at all, which is one of the major criticisms and drawbacks of the algorithm. In hopes of allowing better quality games to thrive, Epic Games is continuously updating and making changes to the Discovery algorithm. These efforts have been somewhat unsuccessful so far, with countless numbers of UEFN developers still constantly complaining about the low player counts their published games get, and how their high-effort games are always being outplaced by other simpler and more low-effort games.

With the release of UEFN, and its new feature of importing custom content, Discovery was met with a wave of intellectual property infringement in its curated rows of creations, ranging from the public facing thumbnail, to in-game assets. These experiences were able to thrive in the Fortnite community due to poor internal content review policies and procedures at Epic. In a tweet posted February 23, 2023 the official Fortnite Creative account addressed the issue for the first time and although this content may sometimes still appear, it has been drastically reduced.

Another controversy that has troubled the beta stage of UEFN and the creator community is the use of requesting DMCA takedowns or action from Epic for experiences containing UGC created in Fortnite that is the same, or similar to other UGC created in Fortnite. Stemming from top creator TeamGeerzy filing an application to trademark "The Pit", and subsequently requesting Epic to takedown experiences with 'pit' terminology in the title (a common practice in many UGC ecosystems). Multiple experiences were then taken down by Epic which lead to major community backlash ultimately resulting in the official Fortnite Creative X account to respond to a tweet where they addressed the issue and reinstating the offending maps.
