= Competitive Fortnite records and statistics =

The Fortnite Championship Series (FNCS) has been the premier competitive Fortnite Battle Royale circuit since its inception in 2019. Not counting the FNCS Pro-Am, 33 FNCS tournaments have been held—27 online on various regions and 6 in-person. These have been contested across different team sizes, giving differing amounts of winners. Prior to the establishment of FNCS, the game lacked any similar official competitive circuits, with Epic Games instead hosting various major one-off tournaments.

== FNCS winners ==
Official name		Dates	Season	Winners							
Official name		Dates	Season	Europe	North America			Brazil	Asia	Middle East	Oceania
Official name		Dates	Season	Europe	East	Central	West	Brazil	Asia	Middle East	Oceania
FNCS: Season X		August–September 2019	C1SX	(Austria) Aqua (Austria) Tschinken (Austria) Stompy	(United States) ZexRow (United States) MackWood (United States) yung calculator	—	(United States) Jayrosez (United States) Dog (United States) Buubee	(Brazil) Leleo (Brazil) Kurtz (Brazil) Wisheydp	(Japan) Takamura (Japan) RizArt (Japan) Maufin	(Saudi Arabia) FHD (Saudi Arabia) NM7 (Saudi Arabia) Yonx	(Australia) Hillo (Australia) Gancho (Australia) Minkin
FNCS: Chapter 2 – Season 1		November–December 2019	C2S1	(Lithuania) RedRush (Sweden) Drobban (Sweden) Wakie (Sweden) Znappy	(United States) Unknown (United States) Stable Ronaldo (Canada) Avery (Canada) KEZ	—	(United States) Kyzui (United States) Sogys (United States) Domo (Canada) Vicaros	(Brazil) Igo (Brazil) Sheco (Brazil) Lasers (Brazil) Histtory	(South Korea) Hood.J (South Korea) Medusa (South Korea) Ming (South Korea) Peterpan	(United Arab Emirates) Sane (United Arab Emirates) Pancake (Singapore) Mev (Malaysia) Nomfu	(Australia) Volx (Australia) Jordan (Australia) Jesse (Australia) Gheez
FNCS: Chapter 2 Season 2	PC	March–April 2020	C2S2	(France) Andilex (France) Nayte	(Canada) Zayt (United States) Saf	—	(United States) EpikWhale (United States) Rehx	(Brazil) Mojak (Brazil) Pulga	(Japan) Rimuru (Japan) Ryle	(Jordan) Unit (Syria) Souriano	(Australia) Kquid (Australia) Jynx
FNCS: Chapter 2 Season 2	Console/ mobile	March–April 2020	C2S2	(France) Laizen (France) Sloww	(United States) Scar (United States) Spud Lite	—	(United States) zScary (United States) Paul	(Brazil) Lucxss (Brazil) Andrezin	(Japan) Clover (Japan) Kucha	(India) Austen (United Arab Emirates) Goofy	(Australia) superoce (Australia) Tperry
FNCS – Invitational		May 2020	C2S2	(Germany) JannisZ	(United States) Furious	—	(United States) Arkhram	(Brazil) Frosty	(Japan) Qjac	(Bahrain) KiritoKun	(Australia) Jordan
FNCS: Chapter 2 Season 3	PC	July–August 2020	C2S3	(Slovenia) TaySon	(United States) Coop	—	(United States) verT	(Argentina) K1nG	(Japan) Fram	(Saudi Arabia) Spy	(Australia) Jynx
FNCS: Chapter 2 Season 3	Console/ mobile	July–August 2020	C2S3	(Poland) Flame	(United States) BMB Twins	—	(United States) Kytrex	(Brazil) Killed	(Japan) WhIzA	(Saudi Arabia) ixDire	(Australia) Skits
FNCS: Chapter 2 Season 4	PC	October–November 2020	C2S4	(United Kingdom) Mongraal (Netherlands) Mitr0 (Slovenia) TaySon	(United States) Deyy (Canada) Mero (United States) Reverse2k	—	(United States) EpikWhale (United States) Arkhram (United States) Rehx	(Brazil) Frosty (Brazil) Kurtz (Brazil) Redlee	(Japan) Bob (Japan) Ruri (Japan) Maufin	(Saudi Arabia) Dexefite (Saudi Arabia) VagnaR (Saudi Arabia) I4xPRO	(Australia) Worthy (Australia) Jynx (Australia) Alecc
FNCS: Chapter 2 Season 4	Console/ mobile	October–November 2020	C2S4	(Netherlands) Jobvos (Republic of Ireland) Paddy (Netherlands) AquaSii	(Mexico) Nut (United States) maxwyd (United States) Assault	—	(Mexico) Dynamic (Mexico) Yasir (United States) john	(Brazil) Juanzin (Brazil) Barroso (Chile) KALIFA	(Japan) Alicerrx (Japan) Clover (Japan) Kucha	(United Arab Emirates) Hanzo (Saudi Arabia) ixDire (Saudi Arabia) ixDear	(Australia) Bajwa (Australia) Breso (Australia) Kulture
FNCS: Chapter 2 Season 5		February–March 2021	C2S5	(Lithuania) Hen (Germany) JannisZ (Sweden) Chapix	(Canada) Acorn (United States) Slackes (United States) Jahq	—	(United States) EpikWhale (United States) Arkhram (United States) Rehx	(Brazil) Seeyun (Brazil) KING (Brazil) Cadu	(Japan) Naetor (Japan) Qjac (Japan) Alice	(Saudi Arabia) Phantom (Pakistan) KuKi (United Arab Emirates) Nyle	(Australia) Muz (Australia) Looter (Australia) Speedy
FNCS: Chapter 2 Season 6		April–May 2021	C2S6	(Serbia) Queasy (Serbia) TruleX (Croatia) Jur3ky	(United States) Deyy (Canada) Mero (United States) Reverse2k	—	(United States) EpikWhale (United States) Arkhram (United States) Rehx	(Brazil) Seeyun (Argentina) K1nG (Brazil) Cadu	(Russia) Force (Russia) Shamokiy (Japan) Allen	(Saudi Arabia) Dexefite (Saudi Arabia) VagnaR (Saudi Arabia) I4xPRO	(Australia) Muz (Australia) Looter (Australia) Speedy
FNCS All-Star Showdown		June 2021	C2S7	(Slovenia) TaySon	(Canada) PaMstou	—	(United States) Riversan	(Brazil) Xeat	(Japan) Runa	(Bahrain) Speedy	(Australia) Volx
FNCS: Chapter 2 Season 7		July–September 2021	C2S7	(Russia) Kiryache (Ukraine) Stormyrite (Russia) Toose	(Mexico) Dukez (United States) Justice (United States) Userz	—	(United States) EpikWhale (United States) Arkhram (United States) Rehx	(Brazil) Phzin (Brazil) Opai (Brazil) GSX	(Japan) Clxxer (Japan) Takachan (Japan) Pacoteen	(Saudi Arabia) FHD (Saudi Arabia) NM7 (Saudi Arabia) Yonx	(Australia) Jace (Australia) Sunz (Australia) VortexM
FNCS: Chapter 2 Season 8		October 2021	C2S8	(Poland) Setty (Poland) Kami (Poland) Teeq	(United States) Bugha (Australia) Muz (Canada) Mero	—	(United States) Reet (Mexico) Snacky (Canada) Favs	(Brazil) Phzin (Brazil) Opai (Brazil) GSX	(Russia) SwizzY (Russia) Zotax (Russia) Shamokiy	(Saudi Arabia) Phantom (Saudi Arabia) Kai (Saudi Arabia) AbuFal7	(Australia) Spiker (Australia) Fab (Australia) Keemo
2021 FNCS Grand Royale		November 2021	C2S8	(Lithuania) Hen (Slovenia) TaySon (Sweden) Chapix	(United States) Bugha (Canada) Mero (Mexico) Dukez	—	(United States) EpikWhale (United States) Arkhram (United States) Reet	(Brazil) Phzin (Brazil) Opai (Brazil) GSX	(Japan) Dokn (Japan) Albedo (Japan) Buyuriro	(Pakistan) Hellon (Indonesia) Murlox (Indonesia) NetloV	(Australia) Alex (Australia) Suns (New Zealand) Tuii
FNCS: Chapter 3 Season 1		February–March 2022	C3S1	(Lithuania) Hen (Serbia) Queasy	(United States) Bugha (Canada) Mero	—	(Canada) Favs (Mexico) Snacky	(Brazil) Phzin (Brazil) Kitoz	(Japan) Runa (Japan) Pepoclip	(Saudi Arabia) FKS (United Arab Emirates) Bleed	(Australia) Basil (Australia) Jace
FNCS: Chapter 3 Season 2		May 2022	C3S2	(Austria) Aqua (United Kingdom) Veno	(United States) Peterbot (United States) Bylah	—	(Canada) Favs (Mexico) Snacky	(Brazil) Xeat (Brazil) KBR	(Japan) Runa (Japan) Pepoclip	(Saudi Arabia) Krool (Saudi Arabia) Asta	(Australia) Looter (Australia) Volx
FNCS: Chapter 3 Season 3		July–August 2022	C3S3	(Germany) JannisZ (Germany) Vadeal	(Canada) Avery (United States) Commandment	—	(Mexico) Yumi (Canada) Kewl	(Brazil) Retake (Brazil) Nov1ce	(Japan) Zagou (Japan) Merem	(Pakistan) Hellon (Kuwait) Rapit	(Australia) Alex (Australia) Baily
FNCS Invitational 2022		November 2022	C3S4	(Poland) Kami & (Poland) Setty							
FNCS Major 1 – 2023		February–March 2023	C4S1	(Latvia) Merstach (Slovenia) TaySon	(Canada) Acorn (United States) Cold	—	(United States) Thorik (United States) Boltz	(Brazil) Phzin (Brazil) Kitoz	(Japan) Zagou (Japan) Pepoclip	(Oman) QnDx (Kuwait) Rapit	(Australia) Anon (Australia) Suns
FNCS Major 2 – 2023		April–May 2023	C4S2	(Serbia) Queasy (United Kingdom) Veno	—	(Mexico) Dukez (United States) Edgey	—	(Argentina) K1nG (Argentina) Fazer	(Japan) Yuma (Japan) Jaemon	(Saudi Arabia) Kalgamer (Bahrain) 7man	(Australia) Anon (Australia) Suns
FNCS Major 3 – 2023		July–August 2023	C4S3	(Russia) Putrick (Russia) SwizzY	—	(United States) Ajerss (United States) Khanada	—	(Argentina) K1nG (Argentina) Fazer	(Japan) Bobi (Japan) Larkpex	(Saudi Arabia) Kalgamer (Bahrain) 7man	(Australia) Forbes (Australia) Jace
2023 FNCS Global Championship		October 2023	C4S4	(United States) Cooper & (Canada) Mero							
FNCS Major 1 – 2024		January–February 2024	C5S1	(Latvia) Merstach (Russia) Malibuca	—	(Canada) Acorn (United States) Cold	—	(Brazil) Seeyun (Brazil) Cadu	(Japan) Shelom (Japan) Zagou	(Saudi Arabia) Kalgamer (Bahrain) 7man	(Australia) Alex (Australia) Worthy
FNCS Major 2 – 2024		April–May 2024	C5S2	(Russia) SwizzY (Ukraine) Vanyak3kk	—	(United States) Peterbot (Mexico) Pollo	—	(Brazil) Persa (Brazil) EdRoadToGlory	(Japan) Michael (Japan) Job	(Saudi Arabia) Adapter (Saudi Arabia) FKS	(Australia) Tinka (Australia) Danath
FNCS Major 3 – 2024		June–July 2024	C5S3	(Austria) vic0 (Germany) Flickzy	—	(United States) Peterbot (Mexico) Pollo	—	(Argentina) K1nG (Argentina) Fazer	(Japan) XMipoli (Japan) Koyota	(Saudi Arabia) Kalgamer (Bahrain) 7man	(New Zealand) Cazi (Australia) Aspect
2024 FNCS Global Championship		September 2024	C5S4	(United States) Peterbot & (Mexico) Pollo							
FNCS Major 1 – 2025		January–February 2025	C6S1	(Germany) Flickzy (Austria) vic0 (United Kingdom) Veno	—	(Mexico) Pollo (United States) Ajerss (Canada) Acorn	(United States) Bacca (United States) Parz (United States) PXMP	(Brazil) Phzin (Argentina) Fazer (Argentina) K1nG	(Japan) Yuma (Japan) Koyota (Japan) Rise	(Saudi Arabia) Hero (Saudi Arabia) FKS (Kuwait) 5aald	(Australia) Danath (Australia) Mace (Australia) Skits
FNCS Major 2 – 2025		April 2025	C6S2	(Ukraine) Vanyak3kk (Denmark) MariusCOW (Sweden) Pixie	—	(United States) Peterbot (United States) Cold (United States) Ritual	(United States) Sxhool (United States) Ark (United States) Salko	(Argentina) Tisco (Brazil) Stryker (Brazil) Cadu	(Japan) Raito (Japan) Razl (Japan) Kimkana	(Saudi Arabia) Hero (Saudi Arabia) FKS (Kuwait) 5aald	(Australia) Resignz (Australia) Alex (Australia) Anon
FNCS Major 3 – 2025		July–August 2025	C6S3	(Denmark) Tjino (Denmark) PabloWingu (Denmark) Fredoxie	—	(United States) Peterbot (United States) Cold (United States) Ritual	(United States) Bacca (United States) Parz (United States) PXMP	(Brazil) Wey (Brazil) Gabzera (Brazil) Scarpa	(Japan) Yuma (Japan) Koyota (Japan) Rise	(Saudi Arabia) Balor (Saudi Arabia) Adapter (Saudi Arabia) Mansoor	(Australia) Resignz (Australia) Alex (Australia) Anon
2025 FNCS Global Championship		September 2025	C6S4	(Russia) SwizzY, (Serbia) Queasy & (Latvia) Merstach							
FNCS Major 1 – 2026		April 2026	C7S2	(Denmark) Sky (Denmark) Scroll	—	(United States) Curve (United Kingdom) Veno	(United States) Khanada (United States) VicterV	(Brazil) 916Gon (Brazil) Night	(Japan) Yuma (Japan) Koyota	(Saudi Arabia) FKS (Saudi Arabia) Hero	(Australia) Alex (Australia) Wreckless
FNCS Major 1 Summit – 2026		May 2026	C7S2	(Austria) vic0 & (Russia) Malibuca							
FNCS Major 2 – 2026		July–August 2026	C7S3	(Denmark) Sky (Denmark) Scroll	—	(Canada) Acorn (United States) Boltz	(United States) EpikWhale (United States) PXMP	(Brazil) Mack (Brazil) Diguera	(Japan) Yuma (Japan) Koyota	(Russia) Howly (Russia) 1Lusha	(Australia) Resignz (Australia) Tinka
2026 FNCS Global Championship		September 2026	C7S4	(Russia) SwizzY & (Sweden) Pixie							
FNCS Solos		September–October 2026	C7S4	(Denmark) Tjino	—	(United States) Ajerss	(Mexico) Darky	(Brazil) Lucx	(Japan) Taiga	(Saudi Arabia) BARQ	(Australia) Mase

== Major non-FNCS tournament winners ==
Official name		Dates	Season	Winners		Ref.
Official name		Dates	Season	Europe	North America	Ref.
Summer Skirmish Series		July–September 2018	C1S5	(United States) Morgausse		
Fall Skirmish Series		September–October 2018	C1S5–S6	(United States) Tfue & (United States) Cloakzy		
2018 Winter Royale		November–December 2018	C1S6–S7	(France) Skite	(United States) Nolan	
Secret Skirmish Series	Duos	January–February 2019	C1S7	(Canada) Ronaldo & (United States) Saf		
Secret Skirmish Series	Solos	January–February 2019	C1S7	(United States) Bizzle		
Fortnite World Cup	Duos	April–July 2019	C1S8–S9	(Austria) Aqua & (Norway) Nyhrox		
Fortnite World Cup	Solos	April–July 2019	C1S8–S9	(United States) Bugha		
Gamers8 2022	Zero Build	July 2022	C3S3	(United Kingdom) Pinq & (Denmark) Anas		
Gamers8 2022	Battle Royale	July 2022	C3S3	(United States) EpikWhale & (Russia) Malibuca		
DreamHack San Diego 2023		April 2023	C4S2	(United States) Kwanti & (Cuba) Threats		
DreamHack Dallas 2023		June 2023	C4S2	(Russia) Malibuca & (Denmark) Th0masHD		
DreamHack Summer 2023		June 2023	C4S3	(Russia) Malibuca & (Denmark) Th0masHD		
Gamers8 2023		July 2023	C4S3	(Poland) Kami & (Poland) Japko		
DreamHack Dallas 2024		June 2024	C5S3	(Saudi Arabia) Team Falcons: (Slovenia) TaySon, (Slovenia) t3eny, (Bosnia and Herzegovina) Chico & (Poland) Japko		
2024 Esports World Cup		August 2024	C5S3	(United States) XSET: (United States) Ritual, (Australia) Muz, (United States) Edgey & (United States) Cold		
2026 Reload Elite Series Championship (2026 Esports World Cup)		August 2026	C7S3–S4	(Germany) BIG: (Austria) vic0 & (Russia) Malibuca		

== Record FNCS winners ==
Statistics do not take into account winners of the FNCS Pro-Am.

=== Global ===
Rank	Player	Wins	Tournaments won
1	(United States) EpikWhale	7	C2S2, C2S4, C2S5, C2S6, C2S7, Grand Royale, C7S3
2	(United States) Arkhram	6	2020 Invitational, C2S4, C2S5, C2S6, C2S7, Grand Royale
2	(Argentina) K1nG	6	C2S3, C2S6, C4S2, C4S3, C5S3, C6S1
2	(Canada) Mero	6	C2S4, C2S6, C2S8, Grand Royale, C3S1, 2023 Globals
2	(Brazil) Phzin	6	C2S7, C2S8, Grand Royale, C3S1, C4S1, C6S1
2	(Australia) Alex	6	Grand Royale, C3S3, C5S1, C6S2, C6S3, C7S2
2	(United States) Peterbot	6	C3S2, C5S2, C5S3, 2024 Globals, C6S2, C6S3
8	(United States) Rehx	5	C2S2, C2S4, C2S5, C2S6, C2S7
8	(Slovenia) TaySon	5	C2S3, C2S4, All-Star Showdown, Grand Royale, C4S1
8	(Canada) Acorn	5	C2S5, C4S1, C5S1, C6S1, C7S3
8	(Russia) SwizzY	5	C2S8, C4S3, C5S2, 2025 Globals, 2026 Globals
8	(Saudi Arabia) FKS	5	C3S1, C5S2, C6S1, C6S2, C7S2
8	(Japan) Yuma	5	C4S2, C6S1, C6S3, C7S2, C7S3
8	(Japan) Koyota	5	C5S3, C6S1, C6S3, C7S2, C7S3
15	(Brazil) Cadu	4	C2S5, C2S6, C5S1, C6S2
15	(Serbia) Queasy	4	C2S6, C3S1, C4S2, 2025 Globals
15	(United Kingdom) Veno	4	C3S2, C4S2, C6S1, C7S2
15	(Australia) Anon	4	C4S1, C4S2, C6S2, C6S3
15	(United States) Cold	4	C4S1, C5S1, C6S2, C6S3
15	(Saudi Arabia) Kalgamer	4	C4S2, C4S3, C5S1, C5S3
15	(Bahrain) 7man	4	C4S2, C4S3, C5S1, C5S3
15	(Argentina) Fazer	4	C4S2, C4S3, C5S3, C6S1
15	(Mexico) Pollo	4	C5S2, C5S3, 2024 Globals, C6S1
24	(Australia) Volx	3	C2S1, All-Star Showdown, C3S2
24	(Australia) Jynx	3	C2S2, C2S3, C2S4
24	(Germany) JannisZ	3	2020 Invitational, C2S5, C3S3
24	(Australia) Muz	3	C2S5, C2S6, C2S8
24	(Australia) Looter	3	C2S5, C2S6, C3S2
24	(Brazil) Seeyun	3	C2S5, C2S6, C5S1
24	(Lithuania) Hen	3	C2S5, Grand Royale, C3S1
24	(Japan) Runa	3	All-Star Showdown, C3S1, C3S2
24	(Brazil) Opai	3	C2S7, C2S8, Grand Royale
24	(Brazil) GSX	3	C2S7, C2S8, Grand Royale
24	(Mexico) Dukez	3	C2S7, Grand Royale, C4S2
24	(Australia) Jace	3	C2S7, C3S1, C4S3
24	(United States) Bugha	3	C2S8, Grand Royale, C3S1
24	(Australia) Suns	3	Grand Royale, C4S1, C4S2
24	(Japan) Pepoclip	3	C3S1, C3S2, C4S1
24	(Japan) Zagou	3	C3S3, C4S1, C5S1
24	(Latvia) Merstach	3	C4S1, C5S1, 2025 Globals
24	(Austria) vic0	3	C5S3, C6S1, 2026 Summit
24	(Saudi Arabia) Hero	3	C6S1, C6S2, C7S2
24	(United States) PXMP	3	C6S1, C6S3, C7S3
24	(Australia) Resignz	3	C6S2, C6S3, C7S3
24	(United States) Ajerss	3	C4S3, C6S1, 2026 Solos

==== LAN ====
Rank	Player	Wins	Tournaments won
1	(Russia) SwizzY	2	2025 Globals, 2026 Globals
2	(Poland) Kami	1	2022 Invitational
2	(Poland) Setty	1	2022 Invitational
2	(United States) Cooper	1	2023 Globals
2	(Canada) Mero	1	2023 Globals
2	(United States) Peterbot	1	2024 Globals
2	(Mexico) Pollo	1	2024 Globals
2	(Serbia) Queasy	1	2025 Globals
2	(Latvia) Merstach	1	2025 Globals
2	(Austria) vic0	1	2026 Summit
2	(Russia) Malibuca	1	2026 Summit
2	(Sweden) Pixie	1	2026 Globals

=== By region ===
Europe
Rank	Player	Wins	Tournaments won
1	(Slovenia) TaySon	5	C2S3, C2S4, All-Star Showdown, Grand Royale, C4S1
2	(Serbia) Queasy	3	C2S6, C3S1, C4S2
2	(Germany) JannisZ	3	2020 Invitational, C2S5, C3S3
2	(Lithuania) Hen	3	C2S5, Grand Royale, C3S1
2	(United Kingdom) Veno	3	C3S2, C4S2, C6S1
6	(Austria) Aqua	2	C1SX, C3S2
6	(Sweden) Chapix	2	C2S5, Grand Royale
6	(Latvia) Merstach	2	C4S1, C5S1
6	(Russia) SwizzY	2	C4S3, C5S2
6	(Ukraine) Vanyak3kk	2	C5S2, C6S2
6	(Austria) vic0	2	C5S3, C6S1
6	(Germany) Flickzy	2	C5S3, C6S1
6	(Denmark) Sky	2	C7S2, C7S3
6	(Denmark) Scroll	2	C7S2, C7S3
6	(Denmark) Tjino	2	C6S3, 2026 Solos
16	(Austria) Tschinken	1	C1SX
16	(Austria) Stompy	1	C1SX
16	(Lithuania) RedRush	1	C2S1
16	(Sweden) Drobban	1	C2S1
16	(Sweden) Wakie	1	C2S1
16	(Sweden) Znappy	1	C2S1
16	(France) Andilex	1	C2S2
16	(France) Nayte	1	C2S2
16	(France) Laizen	1	C2S2 (C)
16	(France) Sloww	1	C2S2 (C)
16	(Poland) Flame	1	C2S3 (C)
16	(United Kingdom) Mongraal	1	C2S4
16	(Netherlands) Mitr0	1	C2S4
16	(Netherlands) Jobvos	1	C2S4 (C)
16	(Republic of Ireland) Paddy	1	C2S4 (C)
16	(Netherlands) AquaSii	1	C2S4 (C)
16	(Serbia) TruleX	1	C2S6
16	(Croatia) Jur3ky	1	C2S6
16	(Russia) Kiryache	1	C2S7
16	(Ukraine) Stormyrite	1	C2S7
16	(Russia) Toose	1	C2S7
16	(Poland) Kami	1	C2S8
16	(Poland) Setty	1	C2S8
16	(Poland) Teeq	1	C2S8
16	(Germany) Vadeal	1	C3S3
16	(Russia) Putrick	1	C4S3
16	(Russia) Malibuca	1	C5S1
16	(Denmark) MariusCOW	1	C6S2
16	(Sweden) Pixie	1	C6S2
16	(Denmark) PabloWingu	1	C6S3
16	(Denmark) Fredoxie	1	C6S3

North America East
Rank	Player	Wins	Tournaments won
1	(Canada) Mero	5	C2S4, C2S6, C2S8, Grand Royale, C3S1
2	(United States) Bugha	3	C2S8, Grand Royale, C3S1
3	(Canada) Avery	2	C2S1, C3S3
3	(United States) Deyy	2	C2S4, C2S6
3	(United States) Reverse2k	2	C2S4, C2S6
3	(Canada) Acorn	2	C2S5, C4S1
3	(Mexico) Dukez	2	C2S7, Grand Royale
8	(United States) ZexRow	1	Season X
8	(United States) MackWood	1	Season X
8	(United States) yung calculator	1	Season X
8	(United States) Unknown	1	C2S1
8	(United States) StableRonaldo	1	C2S1
8	(Canada) KEZ	1	C2S1
8	(Canada) Zayt	1	C2S2
8	(United States) Saf	1	C2S2
8	(United States) Scar	1	C2S2 (C)
8	(United States) Spud Lite	1	C2S2 (C)
8	(United States) Furious	1	2020 Invitational
8	(United States) Coop	1	C2S3
8	(United States) BMB Twins	1	C2S3 (C)
8	(Mexico) Nut	1	C2S4 (C)
8	(United States) maxwyd	1	C2S4 (C)
8	(United States) Assault	1	C2S4 (C)
8	(United States) Slackes	1	C2S5
8	(United States) Jahq	1	C2S5
8	(Canada) PaMstou	1	All-Star Showdown
8	(United States) Justice	1	C2S7
8	(United States) Userz	1	C2S7
8	(Australia) Muz	1	C2S8
8	(United States) Peterbot	1	C3S2
8	(United States) Bylah	1	C3S2
8	(United States) Commandment	1	C3S3
8	(United States) Cold	1	C4S1

North America Central
Rank	Player	Wins	Tournaments won
1	(United States) Peterbot	4	C5S2, C5S3, C6S2, C6S3
2	(Canada) Acorn	3	C5S1, C6S1, C7S3
2	(United States) Cold	3	C5S1, C6S2, C6S3
2	(Mexico) Pollo	3	C5S2, C5S3, C6S1
2	(United States) Ajerss	3	C4S3, C6S1, 2026 Solos
6	(United States) Ritual	2	C6S2, C6S3
7	(Mexico) Dukez	1	C4S2
7	(United States) Edgey	1	C4S2
7	(United States) Khanada	1	C4S3
7	(United States) Curve	1	C7S2
7	(United Kingdom) Veno	1	C7S2
7	(United States) Boltz	1	C7S3

North America West
Rank	Player	Wins	Tournaments won
1	(United States) EpikWhale	7	C2S2, C2S4, C2S5, C2S6, C2S7, Grand Royale, C7S3
2	(United States) Arkhram	6	2020 Invitational, C2S4, C2S5, C2S6, C2S7, Grand Royale
3	(United States) Rehx	5	C2S2, C2S4, C2S5, C2S6, C2S7
4	(Mexico) Snacky	3	C2S8, C3S1, C3S2
4	(Canada) Favs	3	C2S8, C3S1, C3S2
4	(United States) PXMP	3	C6S1, C6S3, C7S3
7	(United States) Reet	2	C2S8, Grand Royale
7	(United States) Bacca	2	C6S1, C6S3
7	(United States) Parz	2	C6S1, C6S3
10	(United States) Jayrosez	1	C1SX
10	(United States) Dog	1	C1SX
10	(United States) Buubee	1	C1SX
10	(United States) Kyzui	1	C2S1
10	(United States) Sogys	1	C2S1
10	(United States) Domo	1	C2S1
10	(Canada) Vicaros	1	C2S1
10	(United States) zScary	1	C2S2 (C)
10	(United States) Paul	1	C2S2 (C)
10	(United States) verT	1	C2S3
10	(United States) Kytrex	1	C2S3 (C)
10	(Mexico) Dynamic	1	C2S4 (C)
10	(Mexico) Yasir	1	C2S4 (C)
10	(United States) john	1	C2S4 (C)
10	(United States) Riversan	1	All-Star Showdown
10	(Mexico) Yumi	1	C3S3
10	(Canada) Kewl	1	C3S3
10	(United States) Thorik	1	C4S1
10	(United States) Boltz	1	C4S1
10	(United States) Sxhool	1	C6S2
10	(United States) Ark	1	C6S2
10	(United States) Salko	1	C6S2
10	(United States) Khanada	1	C7S2
10	(United States) VicterV	1	C7S2
10	(Mexico) Darky	1	2026 Solos

Brazil
Rank	Player	Wins	Tournaments won
1	(Argentina) K1nG	6	C2S3, C2S6, C4S2, C4S3, C5S3, C6S1
1	(Brazil) Phzin	6	C2S7, C2S8, Grand Royale, C3S1, C4S1, C6S1
3	(Brazil) Cadu	4	C2S5, C2S6, C5S1, C6S2
3	(Argentina) Fazer	4	C4S2, C4S3, C5S3, C6S1
5	(Brazil) Seeyun	3	C2S5, C2S6, C5S1
5	(Brazil) Opai	3	C2S7, C2S8, Grand Royale
5	(Brazil) GSX	3	C2S7, C2S8, Grand Royale
8	(Brazil) Kurtz	2	C1SX, C2S4
8	(Brazil) Frosty	2	2020 Invitational, C2S4
8	(Brazil) Xeat	2	All-Star Showdown, C3S2
8	(Brazil) Kitoz	2	C3S1, C4S1
12	(Brazil) Leleo	1	C1SX
12	(Brazil) Wisheydp	1	C1SX
12	(Brazil) Igo	1	C2S1
12	(Brazil) Sheco	1	C2S1
12	(Brazil) Lasers	1	C2S1
12	(Brazil) Histtory	1	C2S1
12	(Brazil) Mojak	1	C2S2
12	(Brazil) Pulga	1	C2S2
12	(Brazil) Lucxss	1	C2S2 (C)
12	(Brazil) Andrezin	1	C2S2 (C)
12	(Brazil) Killed	1	C2S3 (C)
12	(Brazil) Redlee	1	C2S4
12	(Brazil) Juanzin	1	C2S4 (C)
12	(Brazil) Barroso	1	C2S4 (C)
12	(Chile) KALIFA	1	C2S4 (C)
12	(Brazil) KING	1	C2S5
12	(Brazil) KBR	1	C3S2
12	(Brazil) Retake	1	C3S3
12	(Brazil) Nov1ce	1	C3S3
12	(Brazil) Persa	1	C5S2
12	(Brazil) EdRoadToGlory	1	C5S2
12	(Argentina) Tisco	1	C6S2
12	(Brazil) Stryker	1	C6S2
12	(Brazil) Wey	1	C6S3
12	(Brazil) Gabzera	1	C6S3
12	(Brazil) Scarpa	1	C6S3
12	(Brazil) 916Gon	1	C7S2
12	(Brazil) Night	1	C7S2
12	(Brazil) Mack	1	C7S3
12	(Brazil) Diguera	1	C7S3
12	(Brazil) Lucx	1	2026 Solos

Asia
Rank	Player	Wins	Tournaments won
1	(Japan) Yuma	5	C4S2, C6S1, C6S3, C7S2, C7S3
1	(Japan) Koyota	5	C4S2, C6S1, C6S3, C7S2, C7S3
3	(Japan) Runa	3	All-Star Showdown, C3S1, C3S2
3	(Japan) Pepoclip	3	C3S1, C3S2, C4S1
3	(Japan) Zagou	3	C3S3, C4S1, C5S1
6	(Japan) Maufin	2	C1SX, C2S4
6	(Japan) Clover	2	C2S2 (C), C2S4 (C)
6	(Japan) Kucha	2	C2S2 (C), C2S4 (C)
6	(Japan) Qjac	2	2020 Invitational, C2S5
6	(Russia) Shamokiy	2	C2S6, C2S8
6	(Japan) Rise	2	C6S1, C6S3
12	(Japan) Takamura	1	C1SX
12	(Japan) RizArt	1	C1SX
12	(South Korea) Hood.J	1	C2S1
12	(South Korea) Medusa	1	C2S1
12	(South Korea) Ming	1	C2S1
12	(South Korea) Peterpan	1	C2S1
12	(Japan) Rimuru	1	C2S2
12	(Japan) Ryle	1	C2S2
12	(Japan) Fram	1	C2S3
12	(Japan) WhIzA	1	C2S3 (C)
12	(Japan) Bob	1	C2S4
12	(Japan) Ruri	1	C2S4
12	(Japan) Alicerrx	1	C2S4 (C)
12	(Japan) Naetor	1	C2S5
12	(Japan) Alice	1	C2S5
12	(Russia) Force	1	C2S6
12	(Japan) Allen	1	C2S6
12	(Japan) Clxxer	1	C2S7
12	(Japan) Takachan	1	C2S7
12	(Japan) Pacoteen	1	C2S7
12	(Russia) SwizzY	1	C2S8
12	(Russia) Zotax	1	C2S8
12	(Japan) Dokn	1	Grand Royale
12	(Japan) Albedo	1	Grand Royale
12	(Japan) Buyuriro	1	Grand Royale
12	(Japan) Merem	1	C3S3
12	(Japan) Bobi	1	C4S3
12	(Japan) Larkpex	1	C4S3
12	(Japan) Shelom	1	C5S1
12	(Japan) Michael	1	C5S2
12	(Japan) Job	1	C5S2
12	(Japan) XMipoli	1	C5S3
12	(Japan) Raito	1	C6S2
12	(Japan) Razl	1	C6S2
12	(Japan) Kimkana	1	C6S2
12	(Japan) Taiga	1	2026 Solos

Middle East
Rank	Player	Wins	Tournaments won
1	(Saudi Arabia) FKS	5	C3S1, C5S2, C6S1, C6S2, C7S2
2	(Saudi Arabia) Kalgamer	4	C4S2, C4S3, C5S1, C5S3
2	(Bahrain) 7man	4	C4S2, C4S3, C5S1, C5S3
4	(Saudi Arabia) Hero	3	C6S1, C6S2, C7S2
5	(Saudi Arabia) NM7	2	C1SX, C2S7
5	(Saudi Arabia) FHD	2	C1SX, C2S7
5	(Saudi Arabia) Yonx	2	C1SX, C2S7
5	(Saudi Arabia) ixDire	2	C2S3 (C), C2S4 (C)
5	(Saudi Arabia) Dexefite	2	C2S4, C2S6
5	(Saudi Arabia) VagnaR	2	C2S4, C2S6
5	(Saudi Arabia) I4xPRO	2	C2S4, C2S6
5	(Saudi Arabia) Phantom	2	C2S5, C2S8
5	(Pakistan) Hellon	2	Grand Royale, C3S3
5	(Kuwait) Rapit	2	C3S3, C4S1
5	(Saudi Arabia) Adapter	2	C5S2, C6S3
5	(Kuwait) 5aald	2	C6S1, C6S2
17	(United Arab Emirates) Sane	1	C2S1
17	(United Arab Emirates) Pancake	1	C2S1
17	(Singapore) Mev	1	C2S1
17	(Malaysia) Nomfu	1	C2S1
17	(Jordan) Unit	1	C2S2
17	(Syria) Souriano	1	C2S2
17	(India) Austen	1	C2S2 (C)
17	(United Arab Emirates) Goofy	1	C2S2 (C)
17	(Bahrain) KiritoKun	1	2020 Invitational
17	(Saudi Arabia) Spy	1	C2S3
17	(United Arab Emirates) Hanzo	1	C2S4 (C)
17	(Saudi Arabia) ixDear	1	C2S4 (C)
17	(Pakistan) KuKi	1	C2S5
17	(United Arab Emirates) Nyle	1	C2S5
17	(Bahrain) Speedy	1	All-Star Showdown
17	(Saudi Arabia) Kai	1	C2S8
17	(Saudi Arabia) AbuFal7	1	C2S8
17	(Indonesia) Murlox	1	Grand Royale
17	(Indonesia) NetloV	1	Grand Royale
17	(United Arab Emirates) Bleed	1	C3S1
17	(Saudi Arabia) Krool	1	C3S2
17	(Saudi Arabia) Asta	1	C3S2
17	(Oman) QnDx	1	C4S1
17	(Saudi Arabia) Balor	1	C6S3
17	(Saudi Arabia) Mansoor	1	C6S3
17	(Russia) Howly	1	C7S3
17	(Russia) 1Lusha	1	C7S3
17	(Saudi Arabia) BARQ	1	2026 Solos

Oceania
Rank	Player	Wins	Tournaments won
1	(Australia) Alex	6	Grand Royale, C3S3, C5S1, C6S2, C6S3, C7S2
2	(Australia) Anon	4	C4S1, C4S2, C6S2, C6S3
3	(Australia) Volx	3	C2S1, All-Star Showdown, C3S2
3	(Australia) Jynx	3	C2S2, C2S3, C2S4
3	(Australia) Looter	3	C2S5, C2S6, C3S2
3	(Australia) Jace	3	C2S7, C3S1, C4S3
3	(Australia) Suns	3	Grand Royale, C4S1, C4S2
3	(Australia) Resignz	2	C6S2, C6S3, C7S3
9	(Australia) Jordan	2	C2S1, 2020 Invitational
9	(Australia) Muz	2	C2S5, C2S6
9	(Australia) Worthy	2	C2S4, C5S1
9	(Australia) Speedy	2	C2S5, C2S6
9	(Australia) Danath	2	C5S2, C6S1
9	(Australia) Tinka	2	C5S2, C7S3
15	(Australia) Hillo	1	C1SX
15	(Australia) Gancho	1	C1SX
15	(Australia) Minkin	1	C1SX
15	(Australia) Volx	1	C2S1
15	(Australia) Jesse	1	C2S1
15	(Australia) Gheez	1	C2S1
15	(Australia) Kquid	1	C2S2
15	(Australia) superoce	1	C2S2 (C)
15	(Australia) Tperry	1	C2S2 (C)
15	(Australia) Skits	1	C2S3 (C)
15	(Australia) Bajwa	1	C2S4 (C)
15	(Australia) Breso	1	C2S4 (C)
15	(Australia) Kulture	1	C2S4 (C)
15	(Australia) Alecc	1	C2S4
15	(Australia) Sunz	1	C2S7
15	(Australia) VortexM	1	C2S7
15	(Australia) Spiker	1	C2S8
15	(Australia) Fab	1	C2S8
15	(Australia) Keemo	1	C2S8
15	(New Zealand) Tuii	1	Grand Royale
15	(Australia) Basil	1	C3S1
15	(Australia) Baily	1	C3S3
15	(Australia) Forbes	1	C4S3
15	(New Zealand) Cazi	1	C5S3
15	(Australia) Aspect	1	C5S3
15	(Australia) Mace	1	C6S1
15	(Australia) Skits	1	C6S1
15	(Australia) Wreckless	1	C7S2
15	(Australia) Mase	1	2026 Solos

(C) Console/mobile FNCS

=== Consecutive ===
Rank	Player	Wins	Streak	Region
1	(Brazil) Phzin	4	C2S7–C3S1	Brazil
1	(Mexico) Pollo	4	C5S2–C6S1	North America Central, Global
3	(United States) EpikWhale	3	C2S4–C2S6	North America West
3	(United States) Arkhram	3	C2S4–C2S6	North America West
3	(United States) Rehx	3	C2S4–C2S6	North America West
3	(Brazil) Opai	3	C2S7–Grand Royale	Brazil
3	(Brazil) GSX	3	C2S7–Grand Royale	Brazil
3	(United States) Bugha	3	C2S8–C3S1	North America East
3	(Canada) Mero	3	C2S8–C3S1	North America East
3	(United States) Peterbot	3	C5S2–2024 Globals	North America Central, Global
11	(Slovenia) TaySon	2	C2S3–C2S4	Europe
11	(Saudi Arabia) ixDire	2	C2S3–C2S4 (C)	Middle East
11	(Brazil) Seeyun	2	C2S5–C2S6	Brazil
11	(Brazil) Cadu	2	C2S5–C2S6	Brazil
11	(Australia) Muz	2	C2S5–C2S6	Oceania
11	(Australia) Looter	2	C2S5–C2S6	Oceania
11	(Australia) Speedy	2	C2S5–C2S6	Oceania
11	(Lithuania) Hen	2	Grand Royale–C3S1	Europe
11	(Canada) Favs	2	C3S1–C3S2	North America West
11	(Mexico) Snacky	2	C3S1–C3S2	North America West
11	(Japan) Runa	2	C3S1–C3S2	Asia
11	(Japan) Pepoclip	2	C3S1–C3S2	Asia
11	(Australia) Anon	2	C4S1–C4S2	Oceania
11	(Australia) Suns	2	C4S1–C4S2	Oceania
11	(Argentina) K1nG	2	C4S2–C4S3	Brazil
11	(Argentina) Fazer	2	C4S2–C4S3	Brazil
11	(Saudi Arabia) Kalgamer	2	C4S2–C4S3	Middle East
11	(Bahrain) 7man	2	C4S2–C4S3	Middle East
11	(Saudi Arabia) Hero	2	C6S1–C6S2	Middle East
11	(Saudi Arabia) FKS	2	C6S1–C6S2	Middle East
11	(Kuwait) 5aald	2	C6S1–C6S2	Middle East
11	(United States) Peterbot	2	C6S2–C6S3	North America Cenral
11	(United States) Cold	2	C6S2–C6S3	North America Cenral
11	(United States) Ritual	2	C6S2–C6S3	North America Cenral
11	(Australia) Resignz	2	C6S2–C6S3	Oceania
11	(Australia) Alex	2	C6S2–C6S3	Oceania
11	(Australia) Anon	2	C6S2–C6S3	Oceania

(C) Console/mobile FNCS

=== Multiple region winners ===
Player	Tournaments won
(Australia) Muz	C2S5, C2S6 (OCE); C2S8 (NAE)
(Canada) Acorn	C2S5, C4S1 (NAE); C5S1, C6S1, C7S3 (NAC)
(Mexico) Dukez	C2S7, Grand Royale (NAE); C4S2 (NAC)
(Russia) SwizzY	C2S8 (ASIA); C4S3, C5S2 (EU)
(United Kingdom) Veno	C3S2, C4S2, C6S1 (EU); C7S2 (NAC)
(United States) Peterbot	C3S2 (NAE); C5S2, C5S3, C6S2, C6S3 (NAC)
(United States) Cold	C4S1 (NAE); C5S1, C6S2, C6S3 (NAC)
(United States) Boltz	C4S1 (NAW); C7S3 (NAC)
(United States) Khanada	C4S3 (NAC); C7S2 (NAW)

(EU) Europe; (NAE) North America East; (NAC) North America Central; (NAW) North America West; (ASIA) Asia; (OCE) Oceania

== Highest earners ==
As of June 2026, from tournaments such as but not limited to the Fortnite World Cup and FNCS, 21 players have earned over $1,000,000 playing competitive Fortnite—59 have earned over $500,000. Having earned over $3,700,000, Fortnite World Cup winner Kyle 'Bugha' Giersdorf is the highest-earning Fortnite player in the world. Being the tournament with the highest prize pool in Fortnite history, the Fortnite World Cup allowed 15 players to earn over $500,000 in one tournament. Some of them – such as Giersdorf and David 'Aqua' Wang – went on to earn hundreds of thousands after the World Cup; for others – such as Harrison 'Psalm' Chang and Emil 'Nyhrox' Bergquist Pedersen – their World Cup earnings make up the vast majority of their total.

The following table lists every player with $500,000 or more in earnings, expressed in millions of USD and rounded to the nearest thousand.

As of 23 June, 2026

Bold indicates the player is still actively competing

Rank	Player	Real name	Age	Earnings (USD millions)	Organization
1	**(United States) Bugha**	Kyle Giersdorf	23	3.784	
2	(Austria) Aqua	David Wang	24	2.199	
3	(United States) Psalm	Harrison Chang	31	1.875 (Note: Esports Charts doesn't distinguish between earnings from Fortnite and earnings from other games; the following sources are used:)	
4	**(United States) EpikWhale**	Shane Cotton	24	1.866	(United Kingdom) XP42
5	**(Poland) Kami**	Michał Kamiński	21	1.677	(Saudi Arabia) ROC Esports
6	**(Denmark) Anas**	Anas El-Abd	23	1.623	
7	(Norway) Nyhrox	Emil Bergquist Pedersen	24	1.543	
8	**(Serbia) Queasy**	Aleksa Cvetkovic	24	1.451	(United Arab Emirates) Nigma Galaxy
9	**(Denmark) Th0masHD**	Thomas Høxbro Davidsen	24	1.404	(Russia) Virtus.pro
10	(United Kingdom) Wolfiez	Jaden Ashman	22	1.368	
11	(Canada) Zayt	Williams Aubin	26	1.332	
12	**(Poland) Setty**	Iwo Zając	23	1.325	
13	**(Russia) Malibuca**	Danila Iakovenko	21	1.290	(Germany) BIG
14	**(Slovenia) TaySon**	Tai Starčič	22	1.276	
15	**(Argentina) K1nG**	Thiago Bautista Lapp	20	1.257	
16	(United States) Kreo	Nate Kou	25	1.244	
17	(Netherlands) Rojo	Dave Jong	28	1.216	
18	(United States) Saf	Rocco Morales	24	1.210	
19	**(United States)** Ceice	Davis McClellan	26	1.210	
20	**(Canada) Mero**	Matthew Faitel	22	1.019	(United States) Xen
21	**(United Kingdom) Veno**	Harry Pearson	21	1.012	(United States) XSET
22	**(United States) Peterbot**	Peter Kata	19	0.999	(Saudi Arabia) Team Falcons
23	(Canada) Elevate	Hayden Krueger	24	0.994	
24	**(Latvia) Merstach**	Andrejs Piratovs	19	0.892	
25	**(Canada) Acorn**	Abdullah Akhras	22	0.876	(Saudi Arabia) Twisted Minds
26	(France) Skite	Clément Danglot	26	0.870	
27	**(Germany) JannisZ**	Jannis Matwin	21	0.863	(Germany) CGN
28	(Netherlands) Mitr0	Dmitri van de Vrie	24	0.830	
29	**(United States) Cold**	Joshua Butler	19	0.796 (Note: Esports Charts doesn't provide total earnings; the following sources are used:)	(Saudi Arabia) Twisted Minds
30	(United States) Arkhram	Diego Lima	23	0.792	
31	**(United States) Khanada**	Leon Khim Woobin	22	0.765	(United States) Dignitas
32	(Sweden) Chapix	Moussa Faour	22	0.755	
33	**(United Kingdom) Mongraal**	Kyle Jackson	22	0.750	(Austria) Red Bull
34	**(United States) Cooper**	Cooper Smith	19	0.749	(United States) Dignitas
35	**(Lithuania) Hen**	Henrik Mclean	21	0.742	
36	(Sweden) Crue	Theo Ferrer	23	0.729	
37	**(Austria) vic0**	Taylor-Petrik Gatschelhofer	19	0.717	(Germany) BIG
38	(United States) Tfue	Turner Ellis Tenney	28	0.703	
39	**(Mexico) Pollo**	Miguel Moreno	18	0.702	(Saudi Arabia) Team Falcons
40	**(Serbia) TruleX**	Nikola Kruduji	24	0.686	(Sweden) Ninjas in Pyjamas
41	(United States) Bizzle	Timothy Miller	28	0.665	
42	**(Germany) Vadeal**	Alexander Schlik	21	0.658	(Austria) Wave
43	**(United States) Clix**	Cody Conrod	21	0.636	(United States) XSET
44	(Austria) Stompy	Klaus Konstanzer	25	0.634	
45	(United States) Edgey	Ben Peterson	23	0.623	
46	(United Kingdom) Benjyfishy	Benjy Fish	22	0.640	
47	**(Russia) SwizzY**	Egor Luciko	20	0.630	(France) Team HavoK
48	**(Norway) MrSavage**	Martin Foss Andersen	21	0.611	(United States) XSET (Austria) Red Bull
49	**(Bosnia and Herzegovina) Chico**	Kristijan Ljubičić	18	0.605	(Sweden) Ninjas in Pyjamas
50	**(Germany) Rezon**	Lennard Sill	20	0.583	
51	(United States) Dubs	Daniel Paul Walsh	23	0.566	
52	(France) Nayte	Nathan Berquignol	24	0.560	
53	**(Sweden) Pixie**	Wilmer Juriander	19	0.550	(France) Team HavoK
54	**(Ukraine) Vanyak3kk**	Vanya Sakach	21	0.527	(France) Gentle Mates
55	(United States) Falconer	Brendan Falconer	27	0.517	
56	(United States) **Ritual**	Maguire Morton	21	0.515	(South Korea) Gen.G
57	(United States) ZexRow	Anthony Colandro	26	0.514	
58	(United States) **Ajerss**	Aidan Joseph Bernero	20	0.512	(South Korea) Gen.G
59	(United States) Commandment	Josh Roach	21	0.511	

Source: Esports Charts
