= 2025 FNCS Global Championship =

Fortnite Battle Royale tournament

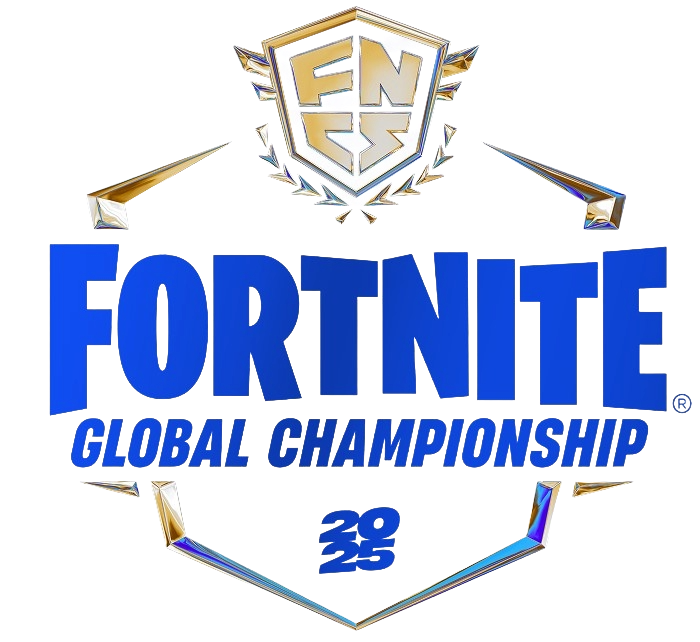

Tournament information
- Location: Lyon, France
- Dates: September 6, 2025–September 7, 2025
- Venue: LDLC Arena
- Participants: 99; 33 trios

Final positions
- Champions: SwizzY, Queasy & Merstach

Tournament statistics
- Most Victory Royales: SwizzY, Queasy & Merstach (3 wins)
- Most eliminations: Fredoxie, PabloWingu & Tjino (87 eliminations)
- Prize pool: $2,001,000

The 2025 FNCS Global Championship was a Fortnite Battle Royale tournament held in Lyon-Décines, France, on September 6–7, 2025. The tournament was the third FNCS Global Championship and the culmination of the 2025 Fortnite Championship Series, the premier Fortnite Battle Royale competitive circuit. It was held at the LDLC Arena and featured a $2,001,000 prize pool. Its winners, Egor 'SwizzY' Luciko, Aleksa 'Queasy' Cvetkovic and Andrejs 'Merstach' Piratovs were crowned Fortnite World Champions.

== Overview ==
The tournament's eventual winners Egor 'SwizzY' Luciko, Aleksa 'Queasy' Cvetkovic and Andrejs 'Merstach' Piratovs qualified through placing fifth in the FNCS Major 2. With Cvetkovic as in-game leader, the trio ended day 1 of the Global Championship with a 185-point lead, much thanks to winning three straight games. Conversely, the trio struggled on day 2, only earning 176 points, but were still able to win the tournament, their cushion having shrunk to only 47 points. Cvetkovic had previously placed 2nd at the FNCS Invitational 2022 and the 2024 Globals; Luciko had been kicked from the 2023 Globals and saw his teammate unable to attend the 2024 Globals due to visa issues; Piratovs had previously been relatively unsuccessful at LAN events, never placing higher than 15th. The victory improved Cvetkovic's standings in terms of most consistent LAN player of all time, and best IGL of all time.

Although North American teams such as Peter 'Peterbot' Kata's and Miguel 'Pollo' Moreno's had often been considered favorites to win the tournament, Europe proved the dominant region with eight trios inside the top 10, to North America's two. Polish, Russian and Scandinavian players were especially successful at the event.

The French audience was especially vocal, booing players such as Peter 'Peterbot' Kata, Michał 'Kami' Kamiński and Iwo 'Setty' Zając while cheering for players representing French esports organization Gentle Mates, including winners Egor 'SwizzY' Luciko and Andrejs 'Merstach' Piratovs.

== Broadcast ==
The tournament was officially broadcast by Epic Games on Twitch and YouTube in English, Portuguese and Japanese, and exclusively on Twitch in French. The English broadcast featured the following team:

Role	Known as	Real name
Broadcast host	(United States) Zeke	Zeke Mateus
Stage host	(United Kingdom) Frankie	Frankie Ward
Caster	(United States) TheBestTaco	Melissa
Caster	(United States) Jacob PR	Jacob Arce
Analyst	(United States) Kelly Link	Kelly Link
Analyst	(United Kingdom) Leven2k	Daniel
Analyst	(United Kingdom) MiniMiner	Scott
Analyst	(United States) Vivid	Noah Wright

Watched by over 950,000 people at its peak, the event is the most-watched Fortnite tournament since the World Cup.

== Qualification ==
Qualification took place in FNCS Majors 1–3 2025.

Region Tournament	Europe	North America		Brazil	Asia	Middle East	Oceania
Region Tournament	Europe	Central	West	Brazil	Asia	Middle East	Oceania
Major 1 (February 2025)	(Austria) vic0, (United Kingdom) Veno & (Germany) Flickzy (Ukraine) P1ng, (Sweden) Wox & (Russia) Malibuca	(Canada) Acorn, (United States) Ajerss & (Mexico) Pollo (United States) Peterbot, (United States) Cold & (United States) Ritual	(United States) Bacca, (United States) Parz & (United States) PXMP	(Argentina) Fazer, (Argentina) K1nG & (Brazil) Phzin	(Japan) Koyota, (Japan) Rise & (Japan) Yuma	(Kuwait) 5aald, (Saudi Arabia) FKS & (Saudi Arabia) Hero	(Australia) ~~danath~~, (Australia) ~~Mace~~ & (Australia) ~~Skits~~
Major 2 (April 2025)	(Ukraine) Vanyak3kk, (Sweden) Pixie & (Denmark) MariusCOW (Denmark) Fredoxie, (Denmark) PabloWingu & (Denmark) Tjino (Poland) Pixx, (Poland) Darm & (Poland) Demus (Russia) SwizzY, (Serbia) Queasy & (Latvia) Merstach (Bosnia and Herzegovina) Chico, (North Macedonia) Hris & (Slovenia) TaySon	(United States) Clix, (United States) Higgs & (Canada) Eomzo (United States) Cooper, (United States) Curly & (United States) Reet (United States) Visxals, (United States) Braydz & (United States) Aminished	(United States) Ark, (United States) Sxhool & (United States) Salko	(Brazil) Cadu, (Brazil) Stryker & (Argentina) Tisco	(Japan) Kimkana, (Japan) Raito & (Japan) Razl	(Saudi Arabia) Rew, (Saudi Arabia) saad & (Oman) Snowy	(Australia) Alex, (Australia) Anon & (Australia) Resignz
Major 3 (August 2025)	(Poland) Setty, (Poland) Japko & (Russia) Panzer (Israel) FoCuS, (Poland) Mikson & (Estonia) Upl (Poland) Kami, (Norway) IDrop & (Poland) charyy (Switzerland) Chap, (Norway) MrSavage & (Germany) Rezon	(Canada) Rapid, (United States) Khanada & (United States) Boltz (Australia) Muz, (United States) Shadow & (United States) Sphinx	(United States) EpikWhale, (India) Paper & (United States) VicterV	(Brazil) Gabzera, (Brazil) Scarpy & (Brazil) WeY	(Japan) Buyuriru, (Japan) Merem & (Japan) wickesy	(Saudi Arabia) Adapter, (Saudi Arabia) Balor & (Saudi Arabia) Mansour	(Australia) Aspect, (Australia) Cazi & (Australia) Tinka

=== Team Changes ===
Oceanian Major 1 winners danath, Mace and Skits were disqualified because of the latter being banned. Their qualification spot was reallocated to Major 3. In Major 3, third placed trio Verman, Solvey and favoq were also disqualified as Skits had been playing on one of their accounts; their qualification spot was rolled down to fourth placed trio VortexM, m0untain and Goofy.

== Format ==
Teams were awarded points for eliminating opponents and outliving them. Each elimination was worth 4 points.

Placement	Points
1st	65
2nd	54
3rd	48
4th	44
5th	40
6th	36
7th	33
8th	30
9th	27
10th	24
11th	21
12th	18
13th	15
14th	12
15th	9
16th	6
17th	3

Source: Epic Games

== Leaderboard ==
Pos	Team	Day 1													Day 2													Total	Prize money
Pos	Team	Results by match												Pts	Results by match												Pts	Pts	Prize money
Pos	Team	1		2		3		4		5		6		Pts	7		8		9		10		11		12		Pts	Pts	Prize money
Pos	Team	P	E	P	E	P	E	P	E	P	E	P	E	Pts	P	E	P	E	P	E	P	E	P	E	P	E	Pts	Pts	Prize money
1.	(Latvia) Merstach (Serbia) Queasy (Russia) SwizzY	4	3	1	12	1	16	1	9	2	2	5	5	521	7	4	6	0	13	0	1	16	16	4	11	5	176	697	$450,000
2.	(Denmark) MariusCOW (Sweden) Pixie (Ukraine) Vanyak3kk	16	1	4	1	6	4	2	4	3	7	4	9	336	2	3	2	6	5	5	3	19	19	0	6	2	314	650	$300,000
3.	(Poland) Japko (Russia) panzer (Poland) Setty	22	3	2	6	5	2	3	7	4	8	8	2	328	15	1	1	8	25	0	5	20	20	1	3	9	262	590	$225,000
4.	(Poland) charyy (Norway) IDrop (Poland) Kami	17	2	8	7	3	4	5	4	8	5	27	1	243	10	3	7	5	31	1	0	2	2	11	1	10	296	539	$180,000
5.	(United States) Boltz (United States) Khanada (Canada) Rapid	1	9	5	1	9	1	21	0	6	6	13	4	267	4	5	5	6	6	4	2	12	12	0	12	0	251	518	$135,000
6.	(Poland) Darm (Poland) Demus (Poland) pixx	11	1	12	3	2	6	7	4	11	1	2	4	277	3	5	4	4	1	7	2	28	28	0	25	0	235	512	$90,000
7.	(Denmark) Fredoxie (Denmark) PabloWingu (Denmark) Tjino	33	0	7	13	26	3	33	0	22	7	1	19	266	18	8	29	3	23	6	10	32	32	1	4	17	245	511	$75,000
8.	(Russia) Malibuca (Ukraine) P1ng (Sweden) Wox	15	2	25	2	10	0	12	3	10	3	10	5	159	1	9	3	6	15	1	1	6	6	4	14	7	322	481	$60,000
9.	(Switzerland) Chap (Norway) MrSavage (Germany) Rezon	3	4	19	0	4	4	6	6	21	0	23	1	188	5	8	15	4	29	1	8	3	3	4	23	0	215	403	$45,000
10.	(Australia) Muz (United States) Shadow (United States) Sphinx	25	0	11	5	22	0	17	1	15	4	11	1	98	8	6	24	0	3	6	8	10	10	2	7	4	304	402	$36,000
11.	(Argentina) Fazer (Argentina) K1nG (Brazil) Phzin	12	7	10	8	21	1	10	5	19	4	24	0	166	14	5	23	0	2	4	5	13	13	3	8	2	235	401	$33,000
12.	(Brazil) Cadu (Brazil) Stryker (Argentina) Tisco	5	2	22	3	30	0	24	0	25	2	3	11	160	13	1	20	2	9	2	0	1	1	16	5	2	239	399	$30,000
13.	(United States) Cooper (United States) Curly (United States) Reet	19	5	9	2	25	3	18	4	9	7	17	3	153	22	4	21	0	17	5	5	4	4	12	2	7	236	389	$27,000
14.	(Germany) Flickzy (United Kingdom) Veno (Austria) vic0	6	7	20	4	31	0	11	5	1	14	30	1	246	6	10	11	5	30	4	0	29	29	0	32	1	137	383	$27,000
15.	(United States) Cold (United States) Peterbot (United States) Ritual	20	1	17	1	23	0	22	3	29	0	12	11	85	11	5	14	7	11	4	7	5	5	14	19	1	276	361	$24,000
16.	(Canada) Acorn (United States) Ajerss (Mexico) Pollo	21	4	16	0	15	5	4	7	5	3	14	2	195	9	3	19	2	27	0	14	15	15	4	21	1	147	342	$24,000
17.	(United States) Bacca (United States) Parz (United States) PXMP	23	0	3	9	33	0	15	4	12	5	33	0	147	20	1	9	6	7	5	8	24	24	2	15	0	193	340	$21,000
18.	(United States) Clix (Canada) Eomzo (United States) Higgs	8	1	6	2	8	6	8	3	7	6	15	1	244	12	4	22	0	22	3	2	18	18	0	20	0	87	331	$21,000
19.	(United States) Ark (United States) Salko (United States) Sxhool	9	9	26	2	14	3	19	6	18	3	9	7	186	26	3	28	0	8	5	1	9	9	4	16	3	127	313	$18,000
20.	(Israel) FoCuS (Poland) Mikson (Estonia) Upl	7	2	23	5	27	0	16	2	13	6	28	1	118	28	0	12	2	10	8	1	23	23	0	10	9	146	264	$18,000
21.	(Kuwait) 5aald (Saudi Arabia) FKS (Saudi Arabia) Hero	14	5	18	7	16	4	14	7	26	0	22	0	122	32	1	33	0	20	2	2	8	8	6	28	1	78	200	$15,000
22.	(Bosnia and Herzegovina) Chico (North Macedonia) Hris (Slovenia) TaySon	2	13	32	0	32	0	9	6	31	1	32	0	161	33	0	31	1	33	0	0	30	30	4	33	0	20	181	$15,000
23.	(United States) Aminished (United States) Braydz (United States) Visxals	10	7	27	0	12	3	13	1	28	0	19	1	105	31	0	13	4	18	3	0	14	14	0	17	2	66	171	$15,000
24.	(Australia) alex (Australia) Anon (Australia) Resignz	31	0	24	0	11	3	20	0	16	1	20	5	63	16	3	10	2	12	4	2	21	21	0	27	1	96	159	$15,000
25.	(Japan) Koyota (Japan) Rise (Japan) yuma	30	0	29	1	17	3	30	2	14	2	31	0	47	30	0	30	1	4	3	2	22	22	1	31	4	112	159	$15,000
26.	(Australia) Goofy (Australia) m0untain (Australia) VortexM	26	1	14	1	19	3	23	0	27	0	16	0	38	21	1	8	8	26	0	2	17	17	0	9	1	120	158	$12,000
27.	(Brazil) Gabzera (Brazil) Scarpa (Brazil) WeY	28	1	31	0	13	5	26	3	17	0	6	5	110	19	1	17	3	14	1	1	27	27	0	24	0	39	149	$12,000
28.	(Japan) Buyuriru (Japan) Merem (Japan) wickesy	27	3	33	0	18	1	32	0	23	0	7	8	81	29	3	16	3	19	3	1	25	25	2	26	3	66	147	$12,000
29.	(Saudi Arabia) Rew (Saudi Arabia) saad (Oman) Snowy	18	2	13	1	7	5	28	0	24	0	25	1	84	17	0	25	0	28	3	1	26	26	0	13	4	50	134	$12,000
30.	(Japan) Kimkana (Japan) Razl (Japan) Raito	29	0	28	1	20	10	27	3	20	4	29	0	72	25	2	26	0	24	5	0	31	31	3	30	1	44	116	$12,000
31.	(United States) EpikWhale (India) paper (United States) VicterV	13	3	15	4	24	0	31	0	32	1	21	4	72	27	0	27	1	21	4	0	33	33	0	22	4	36	108	$9,000
32.	(Saudi Arabia) Adapter (Saudi Arabia) Balor (Saudi Arabia) Mansour	24	1	30	0	29	2	25	1	33	0	18	2	24	24	1	18	6	32	0	3	11	11	3	18	0	73	97	$9,000
33.	(Australia) Aspect (Australia) Cazi (Australia) Tinka	32	0	21	2	28	0	29	0	30	0	26	0	8	23	0	32	0	16	0	7	7	7	2	29	0	75	83	$9,000

Source: esports.gg

== Statistics ==
All statistics take into consideration both days of the tournament.

=== Team ===
Eliminations
Rank	Team	Eliminations
1	(Denmark) Fredoxie, (Denmark) PabloWingu & (Denmark) Tjino	87
2	(Russia) SwizzY, (Latvia) Merstach & (Serbia) Queasy	61
3	(United States) Curly, (United States) Reet & (United States) Cooper	57
4	(United States) Peterbot, (United States) Cold & (United States) Ritual	54
5	(United Kingdom) Veno, (Germany) Flickzy & (Austria) vic0	51

Source: esports.gg

=== Individual ===
Damage ratio
Rank	Player	Ratio
1	(Austria) vic0	1.62
2	(United States) Bacca	1.59
3	(Japan) Koyota	1.54
4	(Poland) Japko	1.52
5	(United States) Ajerss	1.52

Damage to players
Rank	Player	Damage
1	(Russia) SwizzY	21,213
2	(Latvia) Merstach	15,662
3	(United States) Khanada	14,926
4	(Russia) Panzer	13,724
5	(Ukraine) Vanyak3kk	13,396

Eliminations
Rank	Player	Eliminations
1	(Denmark) Tjino	33
2	(Norway) IDrop	32
3	(Denmark) Fredoxie	29
4	(United States) Ark	27
5	(Latvia) Merstach	26

Time alive
Rank	Player	Time
1	(Russia) SwizzY	4h 52m
2	(Serbia) Queasy	4h 51m
3	(Sweden) Pixie	4h 50m
4	(Ukraine) Vanyak3kk	4h 50m
5	(Denmark) MariusCOW	4h 48m

Distance traveled
Rank	Player	Distance
1	(Serbia) Queasy	81.7 km
2	(Poland) Setty	76.6 km
3	(Sweden) Wox	75.6 km
4	(United States) Shadow	72.5 km
5	(Canada) Acorn	71.7 km

Source: Osirion

== Awards ==
Egor 'SwizzY' Luciko was unofficially crowned MVP by Competitive Fortnite Awards.

MVP
Player	Result
(Russia) SwizzY	Won
(Serbia) Queasy	Nominated
(Ukraine) Vanyak3kk	Nominated
(Latvia) Merstach	Nominated
