= 2023 FNCS Global Championship =

Fortnite Battle Royale tournament

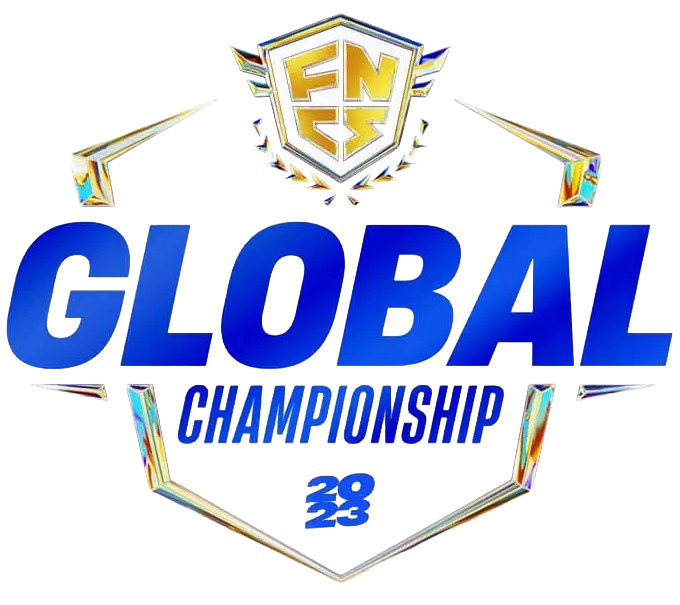

Tournament information
- Location: Copenhagen, Denmark
- Dates: October 13, 2023–October 15, 2023
- Venue: Royal Arena
- Participants: 145; 72 duos and Okis (playing alone)

Final positions
- Champions: Cooper & Mero

Tournament statistics
- Most Victory Royales (Grand Finals): Cheatiin & Pixie; Chico & TruleX (2 wins each)
- Most eliminations (Grand Finals): Cooper & Mero (29 eliminations)
- Prize pool: $4,000,000

The 2023 FNCS Global Championship was a Fortnite Battle Royale tournament held in Copenhagen, Denmark, on October 13–15, 2023, played in duos. The tournament was the first FNCS Global Championship and the culmination of the 2023 Fortnite Champion Series, the premier Fortnite Battle Royale competitive circuit. It was held at the Royal Arena and featured a $4,000,000 prize pool. The tournament took place on three days, the first two acting as qualifiers for the third day's Grand Finals, which was won by Cooper 'Cooper' Smith and Matthew 'Mero' Faitel, who were crowned Fortnite World Champions.

== Overview ==
Eventual winning duo Cooper 'Cooper' Smith and Matthew 'Mero' Faitel formed in April 2023 after the latter had initially retired but decided to let a coin toss decide if he would play with the former; the coin toss went in Smith's favor. The duo qualified to the Global Championship through a second place finish in FNCS Major 2. At the Global Championship, the duo ended up qualifying for the Grand Finals, despite having been relegated to the Lower Bracket on day one. They then won the grand finals with 330 points and the most total eliminations of any duo, albeit without any Victory Royales. Besides sharing $1,000,000 in prize money, Smith and Faitel were awarded a trophy made by Swarovski featuring the FNCS logo. Polish duo Michał 'Kami' Kamiński and Iwo 'Setty' Zając were often regarded as favorites ahead of the tournament, having won the previous year's FNCS Invitational LAN, but they finished as runners up with 271 points.

Only nine players who qualified for the 2019 Fortnite World Cup went on to qualify for the 2023 Global Championship.

In the day one Upper Bracket, Japanese duo Nomura 'Pepoclip' Yuma and Yamada 'Zagou' Yuto notably circumvented the storm surge mechanic – a mechanic punishing the duos that have dealt the least amount of damage to others – by healing a knocked opponent and damaging him, accruing damage to avoid storm surge, and eventually qualifying to the Grand Finals.

Being a global LAN, the tournament featured a rivalry between Europe and North America. Though the winners were North American, nine Victory Royales were achieved by European duos across the tournament, compared to five by North American duos.

== Broadcast ==
The tournament was officially broadcast by Epic Games on Twitch and YouTube in English, Portuguese and Japanese. The English broadcast featured the following team:

Role	Known as	Real name
Broadcast host	(United States) Zeke	Zeke Mateus
Stage host	(United Kingdom) Frankie	Frankie Ward
Caster	(United States) Jacob PR	Jacob Arce
Caster	(United States) MonsterDface	Javier Collazo
Caster	(United States) TheBestTaco	Melissa
Analyst	(United States) Kelly Link	Kelly Link
Analyst	(United Kingdom) Leven2k	Daniel
Analyst	(United Kingdom) MiniMiner	Scott
Analyst	(United States) Vivid	Noah Wright

The event was the most-watched Fortnite tournament since the World Cup in terms of peak viewership, reaching over 720,000 viewers, but would later be surpassed in that regard by the two subsequent Global Championships.

== Qualification ==
Qualification took place in FNCS Majors 1–3 2023, as well as in the FNCS Last Chance Major. Between Majors 1 and 2, the regions North America East and North America West were combined into North America Central. Thus, duos qualified to the Global Championship through all three North American regions.

Region Tournament	Europe	North America			Brazil	Asia	Middle East	Oceania
Region Tournament	Europe	East	Central	West	Brazil	Asia	Middle East	Oceania
Major 1 (March 2023)	(Latvia) Merstach & (Slovenia) TaySon (Russia) Malibuca & (Denmark) Th0masHD	(Canada) Acorn & (United States) Cold	—	(United States) Thorik & (United States) Boltz	(Brazil) Phzin & (Brazil) Kitoz	(Japan) Pepoclip & (Japan) Zagou	(Oman) QnDx & (Kuwait) Rapit	(Australia) Suns & (Australia) Anon
Major 2 (May 2023)	(Serbia) Queasy & (United Kingdom) Veno (Ukraine) Vanyak3k & (Estonia) Karmy (Poland) Setty & (Poland) Kami (Germany) Gripey & (Germany) Flickzy (Norway) IDrop & (Sweden) Mappi	—	(Mexico) Dukez & (United States) Edgey (United States) Cooper & (Canada) Mero (Mexico) Pollo & (United States) Sphinx	—	(Argentina) K1nG & (Argentina) Fazer	(Japan) Yuma & (Japan) Jaemon	(Bahrain) Kalgamer & (Saudi Arabia) 7man	(Australia) Sorif & (Australia) Skits
Major 3 (August 2023)	(Russia) ~~SwizzY~~ & (Russia) ~~Putrick~~ (Serbia) TruleX & (Bosnia and Herzegovina) Chico (Moldova) Misha & (Slovenia) t3eny (Poland) Blacha & (Poland) Mikson (Sweden) Robban & (Sweden) Axeforce (France) Snayzy & (France) PodaSai (Austria) Vic0 & (United Kingdom) Pinq (Russia) Grolzz & (Sweden) Klown (Germany) Fastroki & (Turkey) Kylie (Ukraine) P1ng & (Italy) Kyry	—	(United States) Ajerss & (United States) Khanada (United States) Bugha & (Cuba) Threats (Canada) Rise & (Canada) Eomzo (United States) Brycx & (United States) Chubs (United States) Bacca & (United States) Parz (United States) BatmanBugha & (Canada) Rapid (United States) Ritual & (United States) Reet (Australia) Muz & (India) Paper (United States) ~~Bucke~~ & (United States) Okis (United States) Source & (Mexico) Yumi	—	(Brazil) 916Gon & (Brazil) Pingu (Brazil) Nuti & (Brazil) Gabzera (Brazil) Stryker & (Brazil) azadasz	(Japan) Boby & (Japan) Larkpex (Japan) Stain & (Japan) DayDus (Japan) Mkmkpapa & (Japan) Shelom	(Kuwait) Mshx & (Saudi Arabia) Rew (Saudi Arabia) FHD & (Saudi Arabia) Hero	(Australia) ~~RepulseGod~~ & (Australia) ~~Jace~~ (Australia) Alex & (Australia) Worthy
Last Chance Major (August 2023)	(Norway) MrSavage & (Germany) Vadeal (Russia) ~~NeFrizi~~ & (Russia) ~~Howly~~ (France) Kyzen & (France) Clement (Lithuania) Hen & (Serbia) Vaske (Germany) Vortex & (Italy) Belusi (Sweden) Fnajen & (Sweden) Moneymaker (Germany) JannisZ & (Germany) Rezon (Ukraine) kirb1 & (Russia) ~~fiR3hUNTER~~ (Denmark) Liwshe & (Denmark) Stenno	—	(United States) Bylah & (United States) Peterbot (Canada) Cented & (United States) Pxlarized (United States) Death & (United States) Tahi (United States) Clix & (United States) EpikWhale (United States) Kwanti & (Dominican Republic) Tkay (United States) Krisp & (United States) Noxy (Canada) Fatch & (Canada) PaMstou (United States) Bully & (United States) Shadow	—	(Argentina) Talls & (Argentina) Fishy (Brazil) Diguera & (Brazil) Persa (Brazil) Frosty & (Brazil) WeY	(United States) Dog & (Japan) Raru; ~~(Japan)~~ ~~Cl4x~~ & (Japan) Wickesy (Japan) Zazi & (Japan) DFM	(Saudi Arabia) Adapter & (Saudi Arabia) FKS	(Australia) Gazer & (Australia) Riverr

Source: esports.gg

=== Team changes ===
Russian players Egor 'SwizzY' Luciko, Daniil 'Putrick' Abdrakhmanov, NeFrizi, Vladislav 'Howly' Korobkin and Alexander 'fiR3hUNTER' Vysotsky were disqualified before the event due to the Russo-Ukrainian war. The qualification spots belonging to Luciko & Abdrakhmanov and NeFrizi & Korobkin were rolled down to Charyy & Artur 'G13ras' Gierasimowicz and Lukas 'Cheatiin' Luhn & Wilmer 'Pixie' Juriander, respectively. Other Russian players such as Danila 'Malibuca' Iakovenko were allowed to play because of qualifying outside of Russia. Cl4x could not obtain a visa to compete at the event. Cl4x and Vysotsky's respective teammates – kirb1 and Jack 'Wickesy' Withers – played the tournament together.

At the event, Oceanian Major 3 winners Morgan 'RepulseGod' Bamford and Jace were disqualified from the event due to another player having qualified on Bamford's account. Logan 'Bucke' Eschenburg got disqualified for violating the tournament's Code of Conduct, reportedly specifically for smoking and drinking while streaming at the tournament, which was not allowed. Thus, Eschenburg's teammate Arnel 'Okis' Avdagic played the tournament alone.

== Format ==
The tournament began with the Upper Bracket session on October 13 featuring all teams 49 qualified from the regular FNCS tournaments. The top 25 teams from the Upper Bracket qualified to the Grand Finals, while the remaining 24 competed against the teams qualified from the Last Chance Major in the Lower Bracket on October 14 for the remaining 25 Grand Finals spots. The Grand Finals took place on October 15. The Upper and Lower Brackets featured five matches each, and the Grand Finals featured six.

Teams were awarded points for outliving opposing teams, eliminating them, and completing in-game objectives as follows:

Placement	Points
1st	65
2nd	56
3rd	52
4th	48
5th	44
6th	40
7th	38
8th	36
9th	34
10th	32
11th	30
12th	28
13th	26

Placement	Points
14th	24
15th	22
16th	20
17th	18
18th	16
19th	14
20th	12
21st	10
22nd	8
23rd	6
24th	4
25th	2
26th–50th	0

Action	Points
Each elimination (Note: Defined as one player entirely depleting the HP and shield (if any) of an opposing player. Elimination credit not given to a player following such player's elimination.)	4
Forecast Tower capture (Note: Mid-game objective)	3
Rift Loot Island capture	15

Rules for classification: 1) Points; 2) Total victory royales; 3) Average eliminations in the session; 4) Average placement in the session; 5) Total seconds survived in across all matches

Source: Epic Games

== Leaderboards ==
Upper Bracket
Pos	Team	Results by match										Pts
Pos	Team	1		2		3		4		5		Pts
Pos	Team	P	E	P	E	P	E	P	E	P	E	Pts
1.	(Canada) Acorn (United States) Cold	6	5	2	4	1	7	5	8	34	6	325
2.	(Serbia) Queasy (United Kingdom) Veno	1	7	20	2	9	6	4	7	35	1	251
3.	(United States) Reet (United States) Ritual	2	5	6	8	30	0	19	3	6	5	249
4.	(Canada) Eomzo (Canada) Rise	10	3	4	4	35	0	17	2	1	7	227
5.	(Poland) Kami (Poland) Setty	49	0	8	4	5	7	3	4	22	2	217
6.	(Australia) Alex (Australia) Worthy	11	3	11	0	16	2	8	5	11	4	208
7.	(Bosnia and Herzegovina) Chico (Serbia) TruleX	14	1	28	0	3	2	12	1	3	4	188
8.	(Poland) charyy (Poland) G13ras	12	3	1	10	34	0	13	4	48	0	187
9.	(Japan) Boby (Japan) Larkpex	29	2	32	0	2	11	6	3	18	2	184
10.	(United States) Bacca (United States) Parz	9	8	9	4	19	1	10	2	41	0	174
11.	(Germany) Flickzy (Germany) Gripey	18	2	3	6	21	2	14	4	27	3	170
12.	(Germany) Fastroki (Turkey) Kylie	3	5	37	2	14	5	31	3	19	2	158
13.	(Australia) Muz (India) Paper	41	1	39	0	8	8	7	2	13	3	156
14.	(Russia) Malibuca (Denmark) Th0masHD	13	4	48	0	33	2	2	7	44	0	149
15.	(Sweden) Axeforce (Sweden) Robban	38	0	5	3	6	4	25	1	39	2	144
16.	(United States) Bugha (Cuba) Threats	30	1	27	2	29	0	18	4	2	9	136
17.	(Poland) Blacha (Poland) Mikson	21	1	19	3	15	1	11	0	9	1	134
18.	(Latvia) Merstach (Slovenia) TaySon	5	3	22	1	4	2	39	1	32	1	132
19.	(Brazil) axadasz (Brazil) Stryker	16	2	15	2	36	0	9	3	17	1	126
20.	(Mexico) Pollo (United States) Sphinx	37	0	23	1	48	0	1	12	49	0	123
21.	(Japan) Pepoclip (Japan) Zagou	28	2	16	2	28	3	35	0	7	4	105
22.	(Kuwait) Mshx (Saudi Arabia) Rew	4	5	41	0	43	0	45	0	23	3	101
23.	(United States) Boltz (United States) THORIK	35	0	10	2	12	1	24	2	28	0	99
24.	(Slovenia) Misha (Slovenia) t3enyy	46	0	44	0	31	2	26	1	4	8	95
25.	(Norway) IDrop (Sweden) Mappi	45	0	12	3	10	1	29	0	31	0	91
26.	(Saudi Arabia) FHD (Saudi Arabia) Hero	27	0	13	4	45	0	27	1	8	2	90
27.	(Brazil) 916Gon (Brazil) Pingu	26	2	45	0	17	0	42	0	5	5	90
28.	(United States) Cooper (Canada) Mero	20	4	18	2	39	2	41	1	16	1	88
29.	(Estonia) Karmy (Ukraine) Vanyak3kk	23	1	24	3	13	6	49	0	29	2	84
30.	(Italy) Kyry (Ukraine) P1ng	32	5	49	0	23	2	46	0	10	4	82
31.	(United States) Batman Bugha (Canada) Rapid	15	2	36	0	11	2	30	1	38	2	80
32.	(Brazil) Gabzera (Brazil) Nuti	40	1	7	3	25	0	36	0	15	0	78
33.	(United Kingdom) Pinq (Austria) vic0	8	2	33	0	40	0	21	5	37	0	74
34.	(Oman) QnDx (Kuwait) Rapit	31	2	34	1	26	3	43	0	12	4	68
35.	(Brazil) Kitoz (Brazil) Phzin	39	0	30	1	7	6	33	0	45	0	66
36.	(United States) Source (Mexico) Yumi	7	1	43	0	41	0	16	1	43	0	66
37.	(Bahrain) 7man (Saudi Arabia) Kalgamer	34	0	29	2	24	1	28	2	14	2	56
38.	(Japan) Jaemon (Japan) Yuma	22	1	14	0	32	0	32	1	20	1	56
39.	(Japan) Mkmkpapa (Japan) Shelom	44	0	40	0	27	2	15	2	21	1	52
40.	(United States) Ajerss (United States) Khanada	48	0	17	4	49	0	47	0	24	3	50
41.	(Russia) Grolzz (Sweden) Klown	17	4	31	0	20	0	37	0	30	1	50
42.	(France) PodaSai (France) Snayzy	25	3	25	0	18	1	20	0	36	0	48
43.	(Argentina) Fazer (Argentina) K1nG	19	0	46	0	22	0	23	2	25	1	42
44.	(United States) Brycx (United States) Chubs	36	0	26	0	42	0	22	3	26	3	35
45.	(United States) Okis	43	0	21	2	46	0	44	0	46	1	22
46.	(Mexico) Dukez (United States) Edgey	47	0	42	2	37	0	34	2	40	0	16
47.	(Japan) DayDus (Japan) Stain	24	2	47	0	47	0	48	0	42	0	12
48.	(Australia) Anon (Australia) Suns	42	0	38	1	38	0	38	1	33	0	8
49.	(United States) Skits (United States) Sorif	33	1	35	0	44	0	40	0	47	0	4

Lower Bracket
Pos	Team	Results by match										Pts	Prize money
Pos	Team	1		2		3		4		5		Pts	Prize money
Pos	Team	P	E	P	E	P	E	P	E	P	E	Pts	Prize money
1.	(Norway) MrSavage (Germany) Vadeal	11	4	13	3	8	5	29	3	1	8	249	(Note: Determined in Grand Finals)
2.	(United States) Ajerss (United States) Khanada	4	5	11	2	6	5	13	1	9	0	233	(Note: Determined in Grand Finals)
3.	(United States) Brycx (United States) Chubs	1	5	3	5	29	2	35	0	8	1	217	(Note: Determined in Grand Finals)
4.	(United States) Batman Bugha (Canada) Rapid	3	4	19	2	5	2	43	0	5	7	214	(Note: Determined in Grand Finals)
5.	(United States) Kwanti (Dominican Republic) Tkay	15	4	4	3	26	0	10	6	11	4	200	(Note: Determined in Grand Finals)
6.	(Brazil) Gabzera (Brazil) Nuti	31	1	5	4	7	1	8	2	13	2	184	(Note: Determined in Grand Finals)
7.	(Denmark) Liwshe (Denmark) Stenno	6	6	28	2	12	4	37	0	6	2	176	(Note: Determined in Grand Finals)
8.	(Germany) Cheatiin (Sweden) Pixie	14	1	1	6	23	4	42	0	10	0	171	(Note: Determined in Grand Finals)
9.	(United States) Bylah (United States) Peterbot	21	1	20	2	3	5	39	0	7	6	168	(Note: Determined in Grand Finals)
10.	(United States) Krisp (United States) Noxy	48	0	8	3	33	3	15	5	3	3	166	(Note: Determined in Grand Finals)
11.	(Brazil) Kitoz (Brazil) Phzin	7	3	2	8	45	0	24	4	28	1	162	(Note: Determined in Grand Finals)
12.	(United Kingdom) Pinq (Austria) vic0	36	1	39	2	20	3	1	11	30	4	161	(Note: Determined in Grand Finals)
13.	(Lithuania) Hen (Serbia) Vaske1x	10	4	42	0	10	4	40	1	17	5	159	(Note: Determined in Grand Finals)
14.	(Sweden) Fnajen (Sweden) Moneymaker	38	0	10	5	38	2	47	0	4	6	150	(Note: Determined in Grand Finals)
15.	(France) PodaSai (France) Snayzy	8	1	16	2	32	1	3	1	20	2	148	(Note: Determined in Grand Finals)
16.	(Russia) Grolzz (Sweden) Klown	44	0	6	5	28	1	31	0	2	6	144	(Note: Determined in Grand Finals)
17.	(United States) Cooper (Canada) Mero	2	4	26	3	11	5	38	0	36	1	141	(Note: Determined in Grand Finals)
18.	(United States) Source (Mexico) Yumi	5	4	32	2	9	4	44	0	16	0	138	(Note: Determined in Grand Finals)
19.	(Germany) JannisZ (Germany) Rezon	18	1	7	2	15	1	17	1	23	4	136	(Note: Determined in Grand Finals)
20.	(Estonia) Karmy (Ukraine) Vanyak3kk	12	4	45	1	22	0	6	1	15	3	134	(Note: Determined in Grand Finals)
21.	(Mexico) Dukez (United States) Edgey	28	2	30	0	1	8	20	3	33	1	133	(Note: Determined in Grand Finals)
22.	(Japan) Mkmkpapa (Japan) Shelom	28	0	9	1	16	3	7	4	46	0	127	(Note: Determined in Grand Finals)
23.	(France) Clement (France) Kyzen	9	4	33	3	14	1	18	4	42	0	122	(Note: Determined in Grand Finals)
24.	(Canada) Cented (United States) Pxlarized	23	0	12	1	2	5	33	0	25	1	120	(Note: Determined in Grand Finals)
25.	(Japan) DayDus (Japan) Stain	19	0	48	0	31	1	5	5	12	1	114	(Note: Determined in Grand Finals)
26.	(Argentina) Fishy (United States) Talls	13	6	25	1	17	1	32	3	24	1	113	$4,000
27.	(United States) Clix (United States) EpikWhale	16	4	14	2	24	0	14	0	21	1	110	$4,000
28.	(Saudi Arabia) FHD (Saudi Arabia) Hero	47	0	21	4	34	0	16	4	22	4	101	$4,000
29.	(Brazil) Frosty (Brazil) WeY	30	0	15	4	18	3	19	1	32	2	92	$4,000
30.	(Bahrain) 7man (Saudi Arabia) Kalgamer	25	1	43	0	4	6	34	1	31	2	90	$4,000
31.	(Oman) QnDx (Kuwait) Rapit	24	3	18	1	30	3	25	0	19	4	80	$4,000
32.	(Brazil) 916Gon (Brazil) Pingu	40	0	46	0	42	0	2	5	38	0	76	$4,000
33.	(Italy) Belusi (Germany) Vortex	41	0	35	0	21	1	23	1	18	5	75	$4,000
34.	(United States) Death (United States) Tahi	20	3	27	3	44	0	36	0	14	2	68	$4,000
35.	(Japan) Jaemon (Japan) Yuma	32	3	22	1	48	0	11	3	48	0	66	$4,000
36.	(United States) Bully (United States) Shadow	43	0	37	0	46	0	4	3	35	0	60	$4,000
37.	(Canada) Fatch (Canada) PaMstou	17	1	34	0	13	0	41	0	26	1	52	$4,000
38.	(Japan) Aim (Japan) Zazi	34	0	41	0	35	1	9	3	37	0	50	$4,000
39.	(Argentina) Fazer (Argentina) K1nG	33	0	29	1	36	0	12	2	27	1	44	$4,000
40.	(Brazil) Diguera (Brazil) Persa	45	0	40	0	27	2	21	6	43	0	42	$4,000
41.	(Italy) Kyry (Ukraine) P1ng	22	4	47	0	25	2	27	1	34	0	38	$4,000
42.	(United States) Skits (United States) Sorif	37	0	36	6	41	3	48	0	45	0	36	$4,000
43.	(Ukraine) Kirb1 (Japan) wickesy	26	1	17	0	37	1	28	1	29	1	34	$4,000
44.	(Saudi Arabia) Adapter (Saudi Arabia) FKS	35	1	31	1	19	2	45	0	47	0	30	$4,000
45.	(United States) Dog (Japan) Raru	42	2	23	2	43	0	26	1	39	0	29	$4,000
46.	(Australia) Anon (Australia) Suns	27	0	24	2	47	0	30	1	41	2	24	$4,000
47.	(Australia) Gazer (Australia) River	39	0	44	0	40	0	22	2	44	0	16	$4,000
48.	(United States) Okis	46	1	38	0	39	0	46	0	40	0	4	$4,000

Legend
Color	Movement
	Advancement to Grand Finals
	Relegation to Lower Bracket
	Elimination from tournament

Source: esports.net

Grand Finals
Pos	Team	Results by match												Pts	Prize money
Pos	Team	1		2		3		4		5		6		Pts	Prize money
Pos	Team	P	E	P	E	P	E	P	E	P	E	P	E	Pts	Prize money
1.	(United States) Cooper (Canada) Mero	2	7	2	5	5	5	12	5	14	5	23	2	330	$1,000,000
2.	(Poland) Kami (Poland) Setty	3	4	16	2	19	1	6	3	19	1	2	4	271	$650,000
3.	(Bosnia and Herzegovina) Chico (Serbia) TruleX	17	3	43	0	43	2	10	4	1	4	1	9	268	$400,000
4.	(Germany) Cheatiin (Sweden) Pixie	12	1	1	6	1	8	20	1	34	0	28	0	234	$300,000
5.	(Japan) Mkmkpapa (Japan) Shelom	15	3	14	1	13	2	34	1	2	4	8	4	224	$200,000
6.	(United States) Brycx (United States) Chubs	40	0	34	1	7	7	1	5	9	2	21	0	222	$150,000
7.	(Canada) Acorn (United States) Cold	25	0	5	6	32	1	2	5	17	3	9	2	222	$120,000
8.	(Canada) Eomzo (Canada) Rise	14	2	12	4	18	3	9	1	18	0	6	3	216	$100,000
9.	(United States) Reet (United States) Ritual	5	5	23	2	26	4	7	3	8	1	16	1	208	$80,000
10.	(United Kingdom) Pinq (Austria) vic0	6	6	11	2	12	2	25	2	16	3	29	0	195	$50,000
11.	(Serbia) Queasy (United Kingdom) Veno	13	1	38	0	8	0	3	7	40	1	14	4	190	$50,000
12.	(Germany) Flickzy (Germany) Gripey	9	7	18	3	33	0	40	2	37	0	4	8	178	$50,000
13.	(Estonia) Karmy (Ukraine) Vanyak3kk	45	1	19	4	2	5	13	2	33	0	13	2	178	$50,000
14.	(United States) Batman Bugha (Canada) Rapid	22	0	22	2	10	3	19	0	21	0	3	4	175	$50,000
15.	(Latvia) Merstach (Slovenia) TaySon	16	3	8	2	37	4	16	1	11	3	20	1	174	$50,000
16.	(Mexico) Pollo (United States) Sphinx	1	6	25	0	31	0	28	1	13	4	24	2	149	$30,000
17.	(Slovenia) Misha (Slovenia) t3enyy	38	2	15	4	46	1	37	2	39	3	7	6	147	$30,000
18.	(United States) Ajerss (United States) Khanada	41	2	48	0	4	7	49	2	10	4	38	0	146	$30,000
19.	(Poland) charyy (Poland) G13ras	23	0	3	5	27	0	4	2	24	1	42	1	146	$30,000
20.	(Sweden) Axeforce (Sweden) Robban	46	0	7	4	17	2	5	5	38	0	46	0	144	$30,000
21.	(Kuwait) Mshx (Saudi Arabia) Rew	24	3	20	2	36	0	17	4	15	8	37	0	139	$20,000
22.	(Brazil) Gabzera (Brazil) Nuti	29	0	17	2	3	4	45	0	30	1	12	2	134	$20,000
23.	(United States) Bugha (Cuba) Threats	32	0	41	0	34	0	11	4	3	6	30	2	130	$20,000
24.	(Brazil) axadasz (Brazil) Stryker	36	0	21	0	23	1	38	1	5	4	11	3	126	$20,000
25.	(United States) Krisp (United States) Noxy	8	1	9	5	22	2	41	1	31	0	39	0	114	$20,000
26.	(United States) Bylah (United States) Peterbot	35	1	6	8	21	3	27	2	32	1	35	0	110	$18,000
27.	(France) PodaSai (France) Snayzy	10	2	27	1	14	2	35	2	25	1	18	1	110	$18,000
28.	(Germany) JannisZ (Germany) Rezon	7	3	50	0	25	2	14	5	47	0	33	1	108	$18,000
29.	(Denmark) Liwshe (Denmark) Stenno	37	2	42	0	28	2	31	0	4	9	50	0	103	$18,000
30.	(Australia) Muz (India) Paper	31	0	31	0	45	0	24	2	27	0	5	11	100	$18,000
31.	(Poland) Blacha (Poland) Mikson	42	0	35	0	11	2	18	1	23	2	19	2	94	$16,000
32.	(Mexico) Dukez (United States) Edgey	11	4	13	3	24	0	26	0	26	0	26	1	92	$16,000
33.	(Lithuania) Hen (Serbia) Vaske1x	26	1	29	0	9	4	30	1	28	1	41	0	92	$16,000
34.	(Japan) Pepoclip (Japan) Zagou	28	1	40	0	6	2	33	0	44	1	17	3	86	$16,000
35.	(Sweden) Fnajen (Sweden) Moneymaker	44	0	33	2	39	4	32	1	29	1	10	4	80	$16,000
36.	(Norway) MrSavage (Germany) Vadeal	43	0	28	2	40	2	8	5	41	0	34	2	80	$14,000
37.	(France) Clement (France) Kyzen	20	3	36	0	35	1	39	1	12	5	36	0	80	$14,000
38.	(Japan) Boby (Japan) Larkpex	34	0	10	3	38	0	23	0	45	0	15	2	80	$14,000
39.	(Russia) Malibuca (Denmark) Th0masHD	50	0	4	6	49	0	50	0	50	0	32	1	79	$14,000
40.	(United States) Source (Mexico) Yumi	18	1	37	0	15	0	15	2	43	0	27	1	76	$14,000
41.	(Germany) Fastroki (Turkey) Kylie	27	0	39	1	42	0	22	5	35	2	22	5	68	$12,000
42.	(Norway) IDrop (Sweden) Mappi	4	5	46	0	41	0	42	0	36	0	40	0	68	$12,000
43.	(United States) Bacca (United States) Parz	47	0	45	2	48	0	48	0	7	4	48	1	66	$12,000
44.	(Canada) Cented (United States) Pxlarized	33	2	44	0	29	0	43	1	6	3	45	0	64	$12,000
45.	(Japan) DayDus (Japan) Stain	49	0	24	0	16	5	44	0	20	1	43	0	63	$12,000
46.	(Russia) Grolzz (Sweden) Klown	19	4	26	1	20	1	36	0	49	0	25	1	56	$10,000
47.	(Brazil) Kitoz (Brazil) Phzin	30	4	47	0	47	1	21	3	46	0	31	0	42	$10,000
48.	(United States) Boltz (United States) THORIK	39	0	32	0	30	0	29	1	22	3	44	2	32	$10,000
49.	(Australia) Alex (Australia) Worthy	21	4	49	0	50	0	46	0	42	0	47	0	29	$10,000
50.	(United States) Kwanti (Dominican Republic) Tkay	48	0	30	1	44	1	47	0	48	0	49	0	8	$10,000

== Top eliminations ==
Upper Bracket
Rank	Team	Eliminations
1	(Canada) Acorn & (United States) Cold	30
2	(Serbia) Queasy & (United Kingdom) Veno	23
3	(United States) Reet & (United States) Ritual	21
4	(Japan) Boby & (Japan) Larkpex	18
5	(Poland) Kami & (Poland) Setty	17
5	(Poland) Charyy & (Poland) G13ras	17
5	(Germany) Gripey & (Germany) Flickzy	17
5	(Turkey) Kylie & (Germany) Fastroki	17

Lower Bracket
Rank	Team	Eliminations
1	(Norway) MrSavage & (Germany) Vadeal	23
2	(Austria) vic0 & (United Kingdom) Pinq	21
3	(United States) Kwanti & (Dominican Republic) Tkay	17
4	(Brazil) Kitoz & (Brazil) Phzin	16
5	(Canada) Rapid & (United States) Batman Bugha	15

Grand Finals
Rank	Team	Eliminations
1	(United States) Cooper & (Canada) Mero	29
2	(Serbia) TruleX & (Bosnia and Herzegovina) Chico	22
3	(Germany) Gripey & (Germany) Flickzy	20
4	(Moldova) Misha & (Slovenia) t3eny	18
5	(Canada) Acorn & (United States) Cold	17

Source: esports.gg
