= Manchester City Esports =

Esports department of football club Manchester City

- Full name: Manchester City Esports
- Games: EA Sports FC; Fortnite Battle Royale; Rocket League
- Founded: July 2016
- Owner: City Football Group
- Partners: FaZe Clan; Dubai Expo 2020; Nexen Tire; Etisalat
- Parent group: Manchester City F.C.
- Website: website

Manchester City Esports is the name of several esports teams owned and operated by Premier League football club Manchester City F.C. Though their primary operation is in the UK, as with the football team, they also run teams in China and South Korea.

== UK division ==
Manchester City's first esports team was founded in Manchester in 2016, to compete in European FIFA competitions. They went on to partner with FaZe Clan in 2019, and in 2021, they established a Fortnite Battle Royale team.

=== EA FC ===
Manchester City started its first esports team in 2016 by signing their first esports athlete Kieran "Kez" Brown, followed the year after by their second player Marcus "ExpectSporting" Jorgensen, who signed from Brøndby IF.

==== Roster ====
{{{team}}} EA FC roster
Players
Coaches

Handle	Name	Nationality
Kacee	Anderson, Kacey	United States
Matias	Bonanno, Matias	Argentina
FG	Ghaffur, Faraaz	England
Tekkz	Hunt, Donovan	England

Head coach

Edu Castellano

Legend:
- (I) Inactive
- (S) Suspended
- Substitute
- (injured) Injury / Illness

Latest roster transaction: 17 November 2023.

==== Achievements ====
Type	Competition	Titles	Seasons	Participant(s)
FIFA; EA FC	ePremier League	2	2020–21; 2023–24	Shellz (2020–21); Tekkz (2023–24); Matias (2023–24)

=== Fortnite Battle Royale ===
In October 2021 Manchester City launched its first team outside of FIFA with an entry into Fortnite Battle Royale by signing 16-year-old American Aidan "Threats" Mong. Manchester City had launched a search to sign its first Fortnite Battle Royale player. Prospects up to the task had to navigate through a process that could end with an esports contract. Dubbed the City Solos Hunt, the campaign required players to submit a video explaining why they should be the next member of Manchester City Esports. In April 2022 20-year-old Konrad "Skram" joined the Fortnite Battle Royale roster as the first European player.

==== Roster ====
{{{team}}} Fortnite Battle Royale roster
Players
Coaches

Handle	Name	Nationality
Threats	Mong, Aidan	United States
Trippernn	Kjaer, Sebastian	Denmark
Setty	Zając, Iwo	Poland
Cold	Butler, Joshua	United States

Head coach

- Vacant

Legend:
- (I) Inactive
- (S) Suspended
- Substitute
- (injured) Injury / Illness

Latest roster transaction: 17 November 2023.

=== Rocket League ===
On 4 December 2025, Manchester City would sign their first Rocket League team to compete in the Rocket League Championship Series (RLCS), acquiring the roster known as 2 Danes 1 Bruv.

==== Roster ====
{{{team}}} Rocket League roster
Players
Coaches

Handle	Name	Nationality
accro	Smith, Aston	England
ejby	Lorentzen, William Ejby	Denmark
Seikoo	Grondein, Enzo	France

Head coach

Noah "n0ah" Hinder

Legend:
- (I) Inactive
- (S) Suspended
- Substitute
- (injured) Injury / Illness

Latest roster transaction: 8 March 2026.

== China division ==
Manchester City Esports China
- Full name: Manchester City Esports China
- Games: FIFA
- Founded: 5 June 2018; 8 years ago
- Owner: City Football Group
- Parent group: Manchester City F.C.

Manchester City Esports China is the Chinese esports team of Manchester City F.C. To date the only game in which Manchester City China have competed is FIFA Online. At the team's launch, it was announced that they had signed three leading Chinese players, including Zhang Jun (known as 'ArecaJun' ), the previous season's Most Valuable Player. Filling out their roster of five players, they also announced that the final two players would be signed based on performances in a tournament which Chinese fans of the football club could enter.

=== FIFA Online ===
==== Roster ====
{{{team}}} FIFA roster
Players
Coaches

Handle	Name	Nationality
Jichang	Zheng, Shao-Jie	China
Marspy	Fan, Cheuk Wah	Hong Kong
Daybreak	Huang, Ling-Yan	China
tp	Yao, Ya-Xun	China
J	,	China
LiverPu	,	China

Head coach

- Vacant

Legend:
- (I) Inactive
- (S) Suspended
- Substitute
- (injured) Injury / Illness

Latest roster transaction: 19 November 2019.

==== Achievements ====
Type	Competition	Titles	Seasons
FIFA Online	People's Premier League	1	2019

== South Korea division ==
Manchester City Esports Korea
- Full name: Manchester City Esports Korea
- Games: FIFA
- Founded: 20 November 2019; 6 years ago
- Owner: City Football Group
- Partners: Nexon
- Parent group: Manchester City F.C.

Manchester City Esports Korea is the South Korean esports team of Manchester City F.C. The team was created in 2019 in order to compete in FIFA Online 4 tournaments in South Korea.

=== FIFA Online ===
==== Roster ====
{{{team}}} FIFA roster
Players
Coaches

Handle	Name	Nationality
	Seo, Jun Yeol	South Korea
	Kim, Yoo Min	South Korea
	Kim, Sung Hoon	South Korea

Head coach

- Vacant

Legend:
- (I) Inactive
- (S) Suspended
- Substitute
- (injured) Injury / Illness

Latest roster transaction: 19 November 2019.

== Announcement ==
Manchester City Esports has re-signed Donovan "Tekkz" Hunt and Matias Bonanno for the upcoming EA FC 25 season. The pair played key roles in securing the team’s second ePremier League title. Edu Castellano will continue as head coach, with former pro Zezinho joining the coaching staff. The team’s focus this season is on winning the eChampions League and FC Pro World Championship.
