= FNCS Global Championship =

Fortnite Battle Royale tournament

Fortnite Global Championship
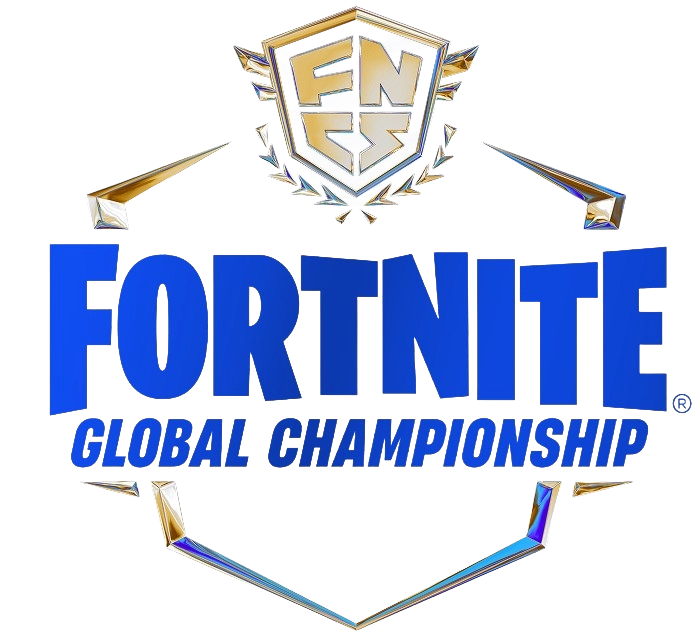
- Genre: Fortnite Battle Royale tournament
- Location: Various
- Years active: 2023–present
- Organizer: Epic Games; Blast ApS
- 2026 FNCS Global Championship

The FNCS Global Championship, Fortnite Global Championship, or simply Globals, is an annual Fortnite Battle Royale LAN tournament. Replacing the Fortnite World Cup, it is regarded as the largest recurring Fortnite tournament today; its champions are considered both FNCS winners and world champions. Since the first tournament in 2023, four FNCS Global Championships have been held. Team size has varied by year, following the competitive format; the 2023, 2024 and 2026 tournaments were held in duos, and the 2025 in trios.

Usually, players qualify to the FNCS Global Championship through a high placement on any of the three Major FNCS tournaments preceding the championship, with certain regions awarding more qualification spots than others. Exceptions include an additional "Last Chance Major" ahead of the 2023 edition, and the "Major 1 Summit" replacing Major 1 in terms of qualifying players for the 2026 edition.

== Background ==
Prior to the FNCS Global Championships, Epic Games organized multiple LAN tournaments, most notably the Fortnite World Cup and the FNCS Invitational 2022. Since the Fortnite World Cup, Epic Games also host FNCS tournaments seasonally.

== Tournaments ==
The host locations for the Fortnite Global Champion

=== 2023 ===
The 2023 FNCS Global Championship was held between October 13–15, 2023 in Copenhagen, Denmark, and played in duos. It was won by Cooper "Cooper" Smith and Matthew "Mero" Faitel.

=== 2024 ===
The 2024 FNCS Global Championship was held between September 7–8, 2024, in Fort Worth, Texas, US, and played in duos. It was won by Peter "Peterbot" Kata and Miguel "Pollo" Moreno.

=== 2025 ===
The 2025 FNCS Global Championship was held between September 6–7, 2025, Lyon-Décines, France, and played in trios. It was won by Egor "SwizzY" Luciko, Aleksa "Queasy" Cvetkovic and Andrejs "Merstach" Piratovs.

=== 2026 ===
The 2026 FNCS Global Championship was held between September 26–27 in Antwerp, Belgium, and played in duos. It was won by Egor "SwizzY" Luciko and Wilmer "Pixie" Juriander.

==== Qualification ====
In the FNCS Major 1 and Second Chance Qualifier, the best-performing duos qualified to the FNCS Major 1 Summit, which in turn has 15 qualification spots to the Global Championship; the remaining qualification spots are distributed across FNCS Major 2 and the Last Chance Qualifier as follows:

Region Tournament	Europe	North America		Brazil	Asia	Middle East	Oceania
Region Tournament	Europe	Central	West	Brazil	Asia	Middle East	Oceania
Major 1 Summit (May 2026)	(Austria) Vic0 & (Russia) Malibuca (United States) Peterbot & (Mexico) Pollo (Romania) shxrk & (Slovenia) t3eny (Denmark) Sky & (Denmark) Scroll (Canada) Acorn & (United States) Boltz (United States) Kingaling & (United States) Kraez (United States) Reet & (United States) Cooper (United States) Shadow & (United States) Vergo (Russia) SwizzY & (Sweden) Pixie (Poland) Darm & (Poland) Demus (Spain) Syaaz & (Spain) Scary (Israel) FoCuS & (Denmark) Th0masHD (United States) Golden & (United States) Ozone (Denmark) Tjino & (Denmark) PabloWingu (Switzerland) Chap & (Germany) Flickzy						
Major 2 (August 2026)	(Poland) charyy & (Poland) Kami (United Kingdom) Cr1nge & (United Kingdom) Twi (Norway) IDrop & (Norway) Ghonzo (United Kingdom) Velo & (United Kingdom) Zynox (Italy) Rax & (Germany) JannisZ (Netherlands) Tidi & (Finland) Julle (Ukraine) Fant & (Russia) Hlechis (United Kingdom) Nebs & (United Kingdom) Nxthan (Poland) Pixx & (Poland) Firen	(United States) Ritual & (United States) Cold (United States) Ajerss & (United Kingdom) Veno (United States) Higgs & (United States) Curve (Australia) Muz & (Canada) Rise (Canada) josh & (Canada) Eomzo (United States) Clix & (Canada) Rapid	(United States) EpikWhale & (United States) PXMP (United States) phoenix & (Canada) Retro	(Brazil) Mack & (Brazil) Diguera (Argentina) Lewa & (Argentina) Romero	(Japan) Yuma & (Japan) Koyota (Japan) Minipiyo & (Japan) FuuKun	(Russia) ~~Howly~~ & (Russia) 1Lusha (Kuwait) 5aald & (Kuwait) Smiky	(Australia) Resignz & (Australia) Tinka (Australia) Solvey & (Australia) Sazers
Last Chance Qualifier (August 2026)	(France) Momsy & (France) Seyyto (Czech Republic) Huty & (Czech Republic) F1shy (France) Izzi & (France) Nociff	(United States) Hcube & (United States) Encrypted (United States) Slepzi & (United States) Wagers	(United States) Ark & (United States) Khanada	(Argentina) Randu & (Brazil) Grx	(Japan) Rura & (Japan) ~~Riv~~	(Kuwait) Mshary & (Saudi Arabia) Salvatore	(Australia) Phazgod & (Australia) Crusades

== Players by wins ==
As of 2026, only Egor "SwizzY" Luciko has won multiple Global Championships:

Rank	Player	Wins	Tournaments won
1	(Russia) SwizzY	2	2025, 2026
2	(United States) Cooper	1	2023
2	(Canada) Mero	1	2023
2	(United States) Peterbot	1	2024
2	(Mexico) Pollo	1	2024
2	(Serbia) Queasy	1	2025
2	(Latvia) Merstach	1	2025
2	(Sweden) Pixie	1	2026

== Players by most appearances ==
As of 2025, 39 players have played in every FNCS Global Championship: (Note: Players who qualified for every FNCS Global Championship but didn't play in all of them include: SwizzY who was disqualified in 2023 and Vanyak3kk, who couldn't attend in 2024 due to visa issues. Additionally, Eomzo, who had failed to qualify in 2024, was added to the tournament as a fill, to then be disqualified from it. He qualified for all other editions.)

Legend
†	Player failed to qualify for the 2023 FNCS Global Championship Grand Finals
	Player also played at the Fortnite World Cup (solos & duos), the FNCS Invitational 2022 and the FNCS Major 1 Summit
	Player also played at the FNCS Invitational 2022 and the FNCS Major 1 Summit
	Player also played at the FNCS Major 1 Summit

Player	Placements			
Player	2023	2024	2025	2026
(United States) Clix †	52nd	11th	18th	4th
(United States) EpikWhale †	52nd	27th	31st	42nd
(Canada) Acorn	7th	26th	16th	12th
(United States) Cold	7th	26th	15th	11th
(Poland) Kami	2nd	23rd	4th	28th
(United States) Khanada	18th	20th	5th	45th
(Russia) Malibuca	39th	32nd	8th	3rd
(Australia) Muz	30th	27th	10th	31st
(United States) Peterbot	26th	1st	15th	23rd
(United States) Reet	9th	12th	13th	33rd
(United Kingdom) Veno	11th	11th	14th	37th
(Austria) vic0	10th	4th	14th	3rd
(United States) Ajerss (Note: Ajerss had initially failed to qualify in 2024, but was added as a fill.)	18th	16th	16th	37th
(United States) Boltz	48th	7th	5th	12th
(Poland) Charyy	19th	29th	4th	28th
(United States) Cooper	1st	20th	13th	33rd
(Germany) Flickzy	12th	4th	14th	21st
(United States) Higgs (Note: Known as Batman Bugha at the 2023 and 2024 editions)	14th	9th	18th	10th
(Sweden) Pixie (Note: Pixie had initially failed to qualify in 2023, but was added as a fill.)	4th	15th	2nd	1st
(Mexico) Pollo	16th	1st	16th	23rd
(Canada) Rapid	14th	9th	5th	4th
(United States) Ritual	9th	12th	15th	11th
(United States) Shadow †	61st	30th	10th	50th
(Japan) Yuma †	60th	43rd	25th	8th
