= 2024 FNCS Global Championship =

Fortnite Battle Royale tournament

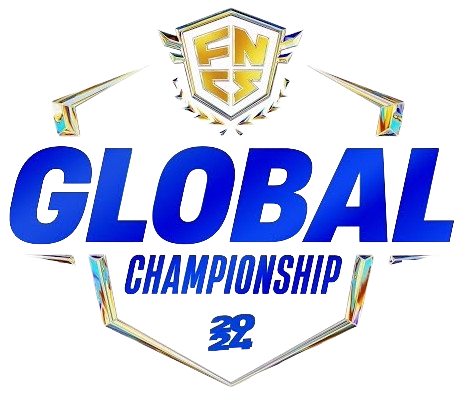

Tournament information
- Location: Fort Worth, Texas, US
- Dates: September 7, 2024–September 8, 2024
- Venue: Dickies Arena
- Participants: 100; 50 duos

Final positions
- Champions: Peterbot & Pollo

Tournament statistics
- Most Victory Royales: Peterbot & Pollo (5 wins)
- Most eliminations: Peterbot & Pollo (81 eliminations)
- Prize pool: $2,000,000

The 2024 FNCS Global Championship was a Fortnite Battle Royale tournament held in Fort Worth, Texas, on September 7–8, 2024, played in duos. The tournament was the second FNCS Global Championship and the culmination of the 2024 Fortnite Championship Series, the premier Fortnite Battle Royale competitive circuit. It was held at the Dickies Arena and featured a $2,000,000 prize pool. Its winners, Peter 'Peterbot' Kata and Miguel 'Pollo' Moreno were crowned Fortnite World Champions.

== Overview ==
Eventual winning duo Peter 'Peterbot' Kata and Miguel 'Pollo' Moreno formed ahead of the FNCS Major 1 2024 and finished runners up behind Abdullah 'Acorn' Akhras and Joshua 'Cold' Butler in that tournament, before winning Major 2 with a record-breaking 1,092 points, and then winning Major 3. The duo achieved a 147 point lead above second-placed Aleksa 'Queasy' Cvetkovic and Thomas 'Th0masHD' Høxbro Davidsen at the end of day one, but let that cushion shrink to 37 points ahead of the twelfth and final game; Cvetkovic and Høxbro Davidsen were the only duo with a chance to overtake Kata and Moreno at that point, but were eliminated in 29th place while Kata and Moreno obtained their fifth Victory Royale, winning the tournament with 985 points to Cvetkovic and Høxbro Davidsen's 776.

== Broadcast ==
The tournament was officially broadcast by Epic Games on Twitch and YouTube in English and Portuguese. The English broadcast featured the following team:

Role	Known as	Real name
Broadcast host	(United States) Zeke	Zeke Mateus
Stage host	(United Kingdom) Adam Savage	Adam Savage
Caster	(United States) MonsterDface	Javier Collazo
Caster	(United States) TheBestTaco	Melissa
Analyst	(United States) Kelly Link	Kelly Link
Analyst	(United Kingdom) Leven2k	Daniel
Analyst	(United Kingdom) MiniMiner	Scott
Analyst	(United States) Vivid	Noah Wright

At its peak, including official broadcasts and third-party watch parties, the tournament was watched by 809,000 people, roughly 80,000 more than the 2023 edition, making it the most-watched Fortnite tournament by that metric since the World Cup, although it would be surpassed by the following year's Global Championship. The tournament received similar viewership to the Fortnite World Cup on Fortnite's official Twitch channel, and its YouTube channel set a new record of nearly 90,000 peak viewers.

== Qualification ==
Qualification took place in FNCS Majors 1–3 2024.

Region Tournament	Europe	North America Central	Brazil	Asia	Middle East	Oceania
Major 1 (February 2024)	(Russia) Malibuca & (Latvia) Merstach (Serbia) Queasy & (Denmark) Th0masHD	(Canada) Acorn & (United States) Cold	(Brazil) Cadu & (Brazil) Seeyun	(Japan) Shelom & (Japan) Zagou	(Saudi Arabia) Kalgamer710 & (Bahrain) 7man	(Australia) Alex & (Australia) Worthy
Major 2 (May 2024)	(Russia) SwizzY & (Ukraine) ~~Vanyak3kk~~ (Slovenia) t3enyy & (Switzerland) Chap (Poland) Kami & (Poland) Setty (Germany) Rezon & (Germany) Vadeal (France) Andilex & (France) Seyyto	(United States) Peterbot & (Mexico) Pollo (United States) Reet & (United States) Ritual (United States) Cooper & (United States) Khanada	(Brazil) Persa & (Brazil) EdRoadToGlory	(Japan) Job & (Japan) Michael	(Saudi Arabia) FKS & (Saudi Arabia) Adapter	(Australia) Tinka & (Australia) Danath
Major 3 (August 2024)	(Germany) Flickzy & (Austria) vic0 (United Kingdom) Czb & (United Kingdom) Nxthan (Ukraine) P1ng & (Sweden) Wox (Germany) JannisZ & (Sweden) Pixie (Denmark) Scroll & (Denmark) Sky (Germany) Cheapz & (Germany) ~~Turtle~~ (Belgium) Casperinovic & (United Kingdom) Prism (Bosnia and Herzegovina) Chico & (Serbia) TruleX (Czech Republic) Huty & (Denmark) KovaaksXD (Poland) G13ras & (Poland) Charyy	(United States) Batman Bugha & (Canada) Rapid (United States) Clix & (United Kingdom) Veno (Cuba) Threats & (United States) Trashy (Mexico) Dukez & (United States) Sphinx (Canada) Avivv & (United States) Bugha (United States) Boltz & (United States) Brycx (India) Paper & (United States) VicterV (United States) EpikWhale & (Australia) Muz (United States) Shadow & (United States) Vergo (United States) Parz & (United States) Bacca	(Argentina) Fazer & (Argentina) K1nG (Brazil) 916Gon & (Brazil) ~~Night~~ (Brazil) Kayky & (Brazil) Kchorro	(Japan) xMipoli & (Japan) Koyota (Japan) Rise & (Japan) Yuma (Japan) Boby & (Japan) Larkpex	(Yemen) ~~Arrow~~ & (Saudi Arabia) ~~Wqzzi~~ (Spain) Clone & (Spain) KramSu (United Arab Emirates) ~~Pixo~~ & (Pakistan) ~~Milo~~	(Australia) Aspect & (Australia) Cazi (Australia) Deymo & (Australia) Resignz

Source: esports.gg

=== Team changes ===
Vanyak3kk and Night could not obtain visas for the event and were thus replaced by Japko and Kwanti, respectively. Turtle could not attend the event and was replaced by Krisp. Pixo was disqualified and Milo could not attend; their spot was awarded to North American duo Rise & Ajerss. Initially, underage Canadian player Eomzo was supposed to play with Wqzzi, replacing Arrow – who also could not obtain a visa – but was himself forced to leave the event due to erroneously filling out his legal paperwork, as well as his legal chaperone, streamer Faxuty, being kicked from the event. Wqzzi was also disqualified after, according to himself, having been deemed "suspicious" by hotel staff. Arrow & Wqzzi were finally replaced by North American duo Braydz & Visxals.

== Format ==
Teams were awarded points for eliminating opponents and outliving them, with 1.5 times more points being awarded on day 2, except for Victory Royales, which gave 65 and 100 points on days 1 and 2 respectively. Each eliminations was as such worth 4 points on day 1 and 6 points on day 2.

Day 1
Placement	Points
1st	65
2nd	56
3rd	52
4th	48
5th	44
6th	40
7th	38
8th	36
9th	34
10th	32
11th	30
12th	28
13th	26
14th	24
15th	22
16th	20
17th	18
18th	16
19th	14
20th	12
21st	10
22nd	8
23rd	6
24th	4
25th	2
26th–50th	0

Day 2
Placement	Points
1st	100
2nd	84
3rd	78
4th	72
5th	66
6th	60
7th	57
8th	54
9th	51
10th	48
11th	45
12th	42
13th	39
14th	36
15th	33
16th	30
17th	27
18th	24
19th	21
20th	18
21st	15
22nd	12
23rd	9
24th	6
25th	3
26th–50th	0

Source: Epic Games

== Leaderboard ==
Pos	Team	Day 1													Day 2													Total	Prize money
Pos	Team	Results by match												Pts	Results by match												Pts	Pts	Prize money
Pos	Team	1		2		3		4		5		6		Pts	7		8		9		10		11		12		Pts	Pts	Prize money
Pos	Team	P	E	P	E	P	E	P	E	P	E	P	E	Pts	P	E	P	E	P	E	P	E	P	E	P	E	Pts	Pts	Prize money
1.	(United States) Peterbot (Mexico) Pollo	7	8	15	3	2	12	18	1	1	10	1	11	442	28	1	36	0	1	10	17	4	1	9	1	12	543	985	$400,000
2.	(Serbia) Queasy (Denmark) Th0masHD	20	1	1	10	8	0	5	3	10	5	13	1	295	1	5	6	0	6	4	11	1	2	12	29	0	481	776	$300,000
3.	(Bosnia and Herzegovina) Chico (Serbia) TruleX	8	2	3	9	17	4	9	2	14	1	6	0	276	6	0	19	1	5	5	20	0	18	1	2	6	351	627	$200,000
4.	(Germany) Flickzy (Austria) vic0	2	7	17	2	20	1	1	9	11	6	29	2	289	42	0	4	8	10	3	23	2	10	5	28	0	285	574	$160,000
5.	(Ukraine) P1ng (Sweden) Wox	24	1	20	1	44	0	40	0	3	6	5	5	164	39	0	11	6	24	9	7	8	11	4	6	4	399	563	$120,000
6.	(Switzerland) Chap (Slovenia) t3enyy	1	7	42	0	11	2	28	1	38	2	42	0	143	43	2	14	3	7	6	13	7	12	4	8	5	390	533	$90,000
7.	(United States) Boltz (United States) Brycx	43	0	14	1	23	3	17	4	2	8	16	4	204	8	1	12	2	40	0	1	5	20	3	17	1	313	517	$60,000
8.	(Mexico) Dukez (United States) Sphinx	6	2	27	0	18	0	11	3	5	2	14	1	186	9	5	35	0	2	1	2	2	40	0	13	2	318	504	$50,000
9.	(United States) Batman Bugha (Canada) Rapid	18	0	4	3	30	0	16	3	29	1	28	0	112	14	4	39	1	4	6	25	2	5	5	3	4	384	499	$40,000
10.	(Poland) Japko (Russia) SwizzY	31	2	46	0	1	10	12	2	35	1	47	0	153	31	1	15	4	39	0	3	8	13	3	4	2	330	483	$30,000
11.	(United States) Clix (United Kingdom) Veno	15	1	11	3	9	2	14	6	23	1	33	0	168	26	4	3	8	18	0	48	0	19	1	15	7	276	444	$24,000
12.	(United States) Reet (United States) Ritual	25	3	25	0	5	6	21	5	30	2	35	2	130	19	2	18	3	23	4	31	1	6	6	5	3	294	424	$24,000
13.	(United States) Bacca (United States) Parz	44	0	2	3	15	2	25	0	41	1	17	4	138	3	4	38	0	3	5	30	0	7	1	22	0	285	423	$24,000
14.	(Canada) Avivv (United States) Bugha	36	0	22	2	10	3	2	2	33	2	38	0	132	5	6	13	1	25	2	29	1	3	7	38	0	288	420	$24,000
15.	(Germany) JannisZ (Sweden) Pixie	37	0	18	6	35	1	38	2	8	0	36	0	88	18	0	2	6	11	2	4	1	25	1	23	4	321	409	$24,000
16.	(United States) Ajerss (Canada) Rise	47	0	5	6	28	1	29	2	19	1	2	5	174	15	3	22	1	8	7	24	0	15	0	42	0	204	378	$20,000
17.	(Brazil) 916Gon (United States) Kwanti	28	0	40	2	36	0	13	2	17	1	39	0	64	13	5	7	3	17	1	15	1	4	4	44	0	312	376	$20,000
18.	(Czech Republic) Huty (Denmark) KovaaksXD	5	5	19	2	6	7	50	0	13	4	11	0	226	25	2	5	6	31	0	37	3	29	0	49	0	135	361	$20,000
19.	(Germany) Rezon (Germany) Vadeal	34	2	6	5	19	0	41	0	24	2	8	8	162	33	1	10	1	14	3	21	6	22	3	47	0	195	357	$20,000
20.	(United States) Cooper (United States) Khanada	32	0	29	1	16	2	37	0	6	3	4	2	140	10	2	24	1	48	0	16	1	31	0	10	5	186	326	$20,000
21.	(India) paper (United States) VicterV	13	1	43	0	12	2	8	5	7	3	43	0	172	32	2	20	1	42	0	39	0	8	3	16	2	150	322	$16,000
22.	(Argentina) Fazer (Argentina) K1nG	38	0	36	0	45	0	23	1	31	2	23	3	36	2	4	43	0	34	1	19	4	16	3	9	3	276	312	$16,000
23.	(Poland) Kami (Poland) Setty	10	5	38	0	37	0	36	0	26	0	32	0	52	34	0	1	7	12	0	9	0	33	0	18	0	259	311	$16,000
24.	(Japan) Koyota (Japan) xMipoli	16	3	24	1	24	1	7	0	9	2	9	4	178	24	2	21	3	15	2	42	1	47	0	25	2	117	295	$16,000
25.	(United Kingdom) Czb (United Kingdom) Nxthan	33	0	21	4	50	0	4	5	15	2	7	8	194	45	0	42	0	13	3	34	1	39	0	20	3	99	293	$16,000
26.	(Canada) Acorn (United States) Cold	4	4	12	6	25	2	10	4	16	4	19	2	232	27	1	48	0	38	1	22	4	42	1	35	1	60	292	$14,000
27.	(United States) EpikWhale (Australia) Muz	11	7	26	0	26	3	24	1	12	2	46	0	114	12	1	26	0	16	1	10	5	26	0	26	2	174	288	$14,000
28.	(Denmark) Scroll (Denmark) Sky	50	0	44	0	13	5	3	6	27	1	30	0	126	30	1	8	6	28	2	49	0	23	2	34	4	153	279	$14,000
29.	(Poland) Charyy (Poland) G13ras	23	0	8	0	14	3	34	0	34	2	3	4	154	36	2	27	0	21	1	6	5	46	0	36	0	123	277	$14,000
30.	(United States) Shadow (United States) Vergo	46	0	39	0	33	0	43	0	45	1	21	0	14	16	3	17	4	46	0	35	2	17	2	7	6	243	257	$14,000
31.	(Brazil) EdRoadToGlory (Brazil) Persa	40	0	34	1	31	0	6	5	4	3	44	0	124	23	3	32	1	20	2	28	1	36	0	11	2	126	250	$12,000
32.	(Russia) Malibuca (Latvia) Merstach	22	2	9	3	3	6	46	3	50	1	50	0	154	50	0	49	0	47	0	41	1	50	0	12	5	78	232	$12,000
33.	(Australia) Deymo (Australia) Resignz	12	3	37	1	7	3	45	1	37	0	31	1	102	7	5	31	0	41	0	32	2	35	2	27	2	123	225	$12,000
34.	(Germany) Cheapz (United States) Krisp	39	0	48	0	46	0	22	6	48	0	49	0	32	48	2	41	0	44	0	14	6	9	6	43	1	117	209	$12,000
35.	(Brazil) Cadu (Brazil) Seeyun	19	1	23	0	38	0	19	2	28	1	27	1	54	37	2	23	1	9	3	12	0	38	0	21	0	153	207	$12,000
36.	(Cuba) Threats (United States) Trashy	14	2	7	3	32	2	15	3	22	4	40	2	156	20	2	50	0	27	0	26	1	24	1	48	0	48	204	$10,000
37.	(United States) Braydz (United States) Visxals	41	0	10	2	29	0	32	0	40	1	10	3	88	11	3	30	0	26	0	18	3	41	0	37	0	105	193	$10,000
38.	(Belgium) Casperinovic (United Kingdom) Prism	26	4	33	1	39	0	26	1	32	0	15	3	58	46	0	29	0	33	0	5	1	14	4	31	0	132	190	$10,000
39.	(Saudi Arabia) Adapter (Saudi Arabia) FKS	9	3	41	0	21	3	20	0	44	0	20	3	104	35	0	40	0	32	0	8	3	43	0	30	1	78	182	$10,000
40.	(Japan) Shelom (Japan) Zagou	29	0	30	0	41	0	33	0	43	0	25	1	6	4	3	16	2	35	2	36	0	21	1	46	1	171	177	$10,000
41.	(Brazil) Kayky (Brazil) Kchorro	42	0	16	4	4	3	48	0	25	2	18	2	130	49	0	28	1	22	3	45	0	49	0	33	1	42	172	$8,000
42.	(Bahrain) 7man (Saudi Arabia) Kalgamer	27	1	49	0	22	3	30	0	47	0	48	0	24	44	0	9	8	30	2	33	1	34	2	24	2	147	171	$8,000
43.	(Japan) Rise (Japan) Yuma	3	8	13	4	42	1	27	3	36	0	41	1	146	21	0	37	0	29	0	47	0	44	1	45	0	21	167	$8,000
44.	(Spain) Clone (Spain) KramSu	30	0	32	1	27	1	39	0	18	3	26	2	44	40	1	44	0	37	0	40	0	32	3	14	6	96	140	$8,000
45.	(Australia) Alex (Australia) Worthy	21	3	35	2	48	0	49	0	20	4	45	2	66	47	2	34	2	45	2	46	0	27	2	50	0	48	114	$8,000
46.	(Japan) Job (Japan) Michael	45	0	28	2	43	0	44	0	42	0	12	2	44	17	5	46	0	43	1	38	1	37	0	40	0	69	113	$6,000
47.	(France) Andilex (France) Seyyto	35	1	47	0	47	0	35	3	49	1	37	0	20	38	0	45	2	19	4	50	0	45	2	39	1	75	95	$6,000
48.	(Japan) BOBY (Japan) Larkpex	17	1	45	0	34	2	31	1	21	1	34	0	48	22	2	25	0	36	1	27	1	28	0	41	0	39	87	$6,000
49.	(Australia) Aspect (Australia) Cazi	48	0	50	1	40	0	42	0	39	1	24	1	16	29	0	33	1	49	0	44	1	48	0	19	4	57	73	$6,000
50.	(Australia) danath (Australia) Tinka	49	0	31	0	49	0	47	0	46	0	22	2	16	41	0	47	0	50	0	43	0	30	0	32	0	0	16	$6,000

== Statistics ==
All statistics take into consideration both days of the tournament.

=== Team ===
Eliminations
Rank	Team	Eliminations
1	(United States) Peterbot & (United States) Pollo	81
2	(Austria) vic0 & (Germany) Flickzy	45
3	(Ukraine) P1ng & (Sweden) Wox	44
4	(Serbia) Queasy & (Denmark) Th0masHD	42
5	(Switzerland) Chap & (Slovenia) t3eny	39

Source: esports.gg

=== Individual ===
Damage ratio
Rank	Player	Ratio
1	(Denmark) Th0masHD	2.5
2	(United States) Peterbot	2.35
3	(Bosnia and Herzegovina) Chico	2.08
4	(United States) Braydz	1.55
5	(Japan) Koyota	1.47

Damage to players
Rank	Player	Damage
1	(United States) Peterbot	24,730
2	(Bosnia and Herzegovina) Chico	18,136
3	(Denmark) Th0masHD	17,394
4	(Sweden) Wox	14,661
5	(Mexico) Pollo	13,632

Distance traveled
Rank	Player	Distance
1	(Ukraine) P1ng	95.6 km
2	(Serbia) Queasy	93.7 km
3	(Sweden) Wox	89.7 km
4	(United States) Peterbot	88.9 km
5	(United States) Clix	84.9 km

Source: Osirion
