= Kami and Setty =

Polish Fortnite duo (2020–2025)

Kami

Personal information
- Name: Michał Kamiński
- Born: January 28, 2005 (age 21); Poland
- Nationality: Poland

Career information
- Game: Fortnite

Team history
- 2020: TheCartel Esports
- 2020–2021: Gamma Gaming
- 2022–2023: Become Legends
- 2023–2024: Gaimin Gladiators
- 2025–2026: Al Qadsiah

Setty

Personal information
- Name: Iwo Zając
- Born: September 8, 2003 (age 23); Poland
- Nationality: Poland

Career information
- Game: Fortnite

Team history
- 2018: Vex.esport
- 2018–2019: Grom.F1rst
- 2019: 300 Spartans
- 2020: Spectrum ESC
- 2021–2023: Become Legends
- 2023: Tundra Esports
- 2024–2025: Manchester City

Michał Kamiński (born January 28, 2005) and Iwo Zając (born September 8, 2003), better known as Kami and Setty respectively, are Polish professional Fortnite Battle Royale players known for winning the FNCS Invitational 2022. Having played every FNCS together between 2021 and 2025, except for one in 2022, of which they won two, the duo was often regarded as one of the best in the world.

Kamiński and Zając are both among the few players globally to have earnt over $1,000,000 playing Fortnite, having earnt over 1.6 and 1.3 million dollars respectively.

== Fortnite careers ==
First competing in 2019, aged 14 and 15 respectively, Kamiński and Zając both made over $1,000 in the Fortnite World Cup qualification. Kamiński qualified for his first FNCS in Chapter 2 Season 2, going on to place 5th alongside Jakub 'Kubx' Świtała, earning $20,000. Kamiński has since qualified for all but one FNCS, also placing 4th in Season 4, earning another $20,000. Zając, however, first qualified in Season 3. Much like Kamiński, he has since only failed to qualify for FNCS once.

=== (2020–2021) Trios with Teeq and FNCS win ===
With trios as the competitive gamemode in the latter half of Chapter 2, Zając and fellow Polish player Maciej 'Teeq' Radzio – already having played together in the Season 4 FNCS – began playing with Kamiński in late 2020. In terms of FNCS, the trio placed sixth in Season 5 before failing to qualify in Season 6, and then placing fourth in Season 7. At the June 2021 solo All-Star Showdown FNCS, Zając also managed to finish 13th, earning $15,000. In the Season 8 FNCS, Kamiński, Zając and Radzio won with 420 points – nearly 100 points above the second-placed trio. Three weeks later, they finished second in the 2021 FNCS Grand Royale behind the trio of Tai 'TaySon' Starčič, Henrik 'Hen' Mclean and Moussa 'Chapix' Faour.

=== (2022) Brief split ===
With the switch in competitive gamemode to duos for Chapter 3, Kamiński kept playing with Radzio, while Zając was left to play FNCS with Moussa 'Chapix' Faour; both duos were considered contenters to win the Season 1 FNCS, but ended up placing 20th and 44th, respectively.

=== (2022–2024) Invitational win and high FNCS placements ===
Both playing for Become Legends, Kamiński and Zając played together for the Chapter 3 Season 2 FNCS, placing 5th and earning $50,000 each, before placing ninth the following season. Between these FNCS tournaments, the duo took part in the 2022 Gamers8 LAN in Riyadh. Featuring various titles, the LAN had Fortnite tournaments in Battle Royale and Zero Build. Kamiński and Zając finished sixth in the Zero Build tournament taking place between July 28–29, 2022, earning $20,000 each. Often predicted to win the Battle Royale tournament, the duo took first place at the end of day 1 on July 30, but ended up third after the following day, earning $50,000 each.

Kamiński and Zając were among the 50 duos invited to play at the FNCS Invitational 2022 on November 12–13, 2022; Kamiński and Zając ended up winning the eleventh match of that tournament, taking the lead ahead of the twelfth and final match. Trying to catch the Polish duo off guard, second-placed duo Aleksa 'Queasy' Cvetkovic and Harry 'Veno' Pearson contested Kamiński and Zając at their drop spot, but lost to them off-spawn, allowing Kamiński and Zając to win the tournament, earning $100,000 each.

After placing 23rd in the first FNCS of Chapter 4, Kamiński and Zając qualified to the 2023 FNCS Global Championship by placing fifth in Season 2. The duo then placed fourth in Season 3's FNCS. At the 2023 FNCS Global Championship, Kamiński and Zając were often considered favorites to win. During the first game of its Grand Finals, they were contested by Japanese duo Stain and DayDus; Kamiński landed before the former and found a sniper rifle with which he no-scoped him in a renowned play. Kamiński and Zając eventually finished runners-up behind Cooper 'Cooper' Smith and Matthew 'Mero' Faitel.

In the first FNCS of Chapter 5, Kamiński and Zając placed 33rd, their worst FNCS placement together since failing to qualify nearly three years prior. In the following FNCS, however, the duo placed 3rd, qualifying for the 2024 FNCS Global Championship and earning $50,000 each.

=== (2024–2025) FNCS underperformances and split ===
Already qualified for the Global Championship, the Chapter 5 Season 3 FNCS proved an underperformance for Kamiński and Zając as they placed 48th – third last. Though they did win one match at the 2024 Global Championship, Kamiński and Zając only finished 23rd.

With the competitive gamemode switching to trios in Chapter 6, Kamiński and Zając initially played together alongside Polish player 'charry'. After placing 21st in FNCS Major 1, and ninth in Major 2, Kamiński split from Zając. According to both players, Kamiński had begun to adopt the IGL role after originally being a fragger, while Zając was still an IGL, which had caused friction.

=== (2025–present) Post-split ===
Both Zając and Kamiński qualified to the 2025 FNCS Global Championship through FNCS Major 3, the former alongside Aleksy 'Japko' Jablonsk and 'Panzer', and the latter alongside 'charyy' and Miran 'IDrop' Tavakolzadeh. At Globals, Zając and Kamiński's trios placed third and fourth, respectively. Kamiński and Zając were both booed significantly by the French audience at the event.
