= Peterbot =

American professional Fortnite player and Twitch streamer (born 2007)

Personal information
- Name: Peter Kata
- Born: June 20, 2007 (age 19)
- Nationality: Hungarian-American

Current team
- Team: Free Agent
- Game: Fortnite

Career information
- Playing career: 2020–present

Team history
- 2021: Flu Esports
- 2021–2022: Tru North Gaming
- 2023: Elite Esports
- 2024: Agent Gaming
- 2024: Exceed
- 2024–presents: Falcons

Career highlights and awards
- FNCS champion (2022 – C3S2); FNCS runner-up (2024 – C5S1); FNCS champion (2024 – C5S2); FNCS champion (2024 – C5S3); 2024 FNCS Global Championship winner; Esports World Cup 2024 runner-up (playing for Exceed); FNCS runner-up (2025 – C6S1); FNCS champion (2025 – C6S2); 2025 FNCS Pro-Am champion; FNCS champion (2025 – C6S3); 2026 FNCS Major 1 Summit runner-up

Twitch information
- Channel: Peterbot
- Followers: 1 million

YouTube information
- Channel: Peterbot
- Years active: 2020–present
- Subscribers: 947 thousand
- Views: 132.7 million
- Last updated: April 23rd, 2026

Peter Kata (born June 20, 2007), better known as Peterbot, (Note: Sometimes, particularly in the past, stylized as PeterBot.) is a Hungarian-American Fortnite player and Twitch streamer. Having won the 2024 FNCS Global Championship among 5 other FNCS events, he is widely regarded as the best Fortnite player of all time. As of 2026, Kata has earned nearly $1,000,000 in Fortnite tournament prize money.

== Fortnite career ==
=== 2021–2022: Early FNCS qualifications and win ===
Having played competitively since 2020, Kata qualified for his first FNCS Grand Finals in Chapter 2 Season 7, in 2021. He later placed 4th in the FNCS Grand Royale, alongside Logan "Bucke" Eschenburg and Mack "MackWood" Aesoph, earning them $28,000 each.

Playing alongside Bylah, Kata won Chapter 3 Season 2's FNCS, earning $65,000.

=== 2022–2023: LAN underperformances ===
Kata underperformed at the 2022 FNCS Invitational LAN, placing 37th out of 50 teams alongside Jamper, albeit gaining attention for his aiming ability when eliminating Australian player Basil. Similarly, Kata only managed to place 26th at the 2023 FNCS Global Championship alongside former FNCS winning teammate Bylah, earning them $9,000 each.

=== 2024–present: Consecutive FNCS wins ===
In 2024, playing with Miguel "Pollo" Moreno, Kata placed second in Chapter 5 Season 1's FNCS, earning them $45,000 each. Then, in Chapter 5 Season 2, Kata and Moreno won all weekly Cash Cups leading up to the FNCS Grand Finals, which they won with a record-breaking point tally, qualifying them for the 2024 Global Championship. Kata and Moreno also won Chapter 5 Season 3's FNCS. Their two consecutive FNCS wins earned them $140,000 each.

Playing for Exceed, Kata finished second at the 2024 Esports World Cup in August 2024.

Winning five out of twelve games, Kata and Moreno won the 2024 FNCS Global Championship, earning $200,000 each. Kata and Moreno's performances in 2024 made them widely regarded as the two best players of the year.

In Chapter 6 Season 1, as the competitive game mode had switched to trios, Kata played with Joshua "Cold" Butler and Maguire "Ritual" Morton, winning every weekly Divisional Cup leading up to the FNCS Grand Finals. Despite this, the trio placed second in Grands, losing out to Moreno's trio, albeit qualifying for the 2025 Global Championship and earning $25,500 each. Despite qualifying for Globals alongside Morton, Kata and Butler played the first three Divisional Cups of Chapter 6 Season 2 with Miguel Moreno, winning every one. Moreno, however couldn't play FNCS with Kata and Butler, since he had already qualified for the 2025 Global Championship alongside his own trio, and doing so would require all six qualified players to sign a disbandment form, which they didn't. Thus, Kata and Butler again played with Morton, winning both Chapter 6 Season 2 and 3's FNCS Grand Finals – the former only 11 points above Cody "Clix" Conrod's trio, and the latter only 3 points above Moreno's.

On May 10, 2025, in between his two FNCS victories, Kata won the FNCS Pro-Am alongside content creator AussieAntics, earning them $25,000 each. Kata was then challenged by former FNCS winner Rani "Ronaldo" Netz to a first to 100 elimination Fortnite 1v1 in which Netz would begin with a 99 elimination lead. Initially, the duel would be for a $10,000 wager, but it was later increased to $25,000, upon Fortnite themselves sponsoring the duel and adding $15,000 to the prize. On May 15, winning 100 straight 1v1s, of which 75 were build fights and 25 were zone wars, Kata defeated Netz and earned $25,000.

Despite Kata's and Moreno's respective trios having achieved the highest placements in the year leading up to the 2025 Global Championship, and having been favorites to win it, Kata's and Moreno's trios placed 15th and 16th respectively at the LAN tournament in a performance described as "horrendous" by Jordan Ashley of Hotspawn.

Upon the competitive format switching back to duos after the 2025 Globals, Kata and Moreno began playing together again, initially enjoying a streak of two Performance Evaluation and two FNCS Divisional Cup victories in September. In April 2026, the duo placed seventh in FNCS Major 1, qualifying for the FNCS Major 1 Summit in May, at which they placed runners-up. In total, the two tournaments earned Kata $83,000.

== Style of play ==
Known for his exceptional mechanics and aim, Kata's style of play has been described as "aggressive yet strategic". He has been known for notable clutches in major tournaments. Ahead of the 2024 FNCS Global Championship, Kata was called an "IGL-fragger" by host Miniminer, due to him leading his team yet also often fighting. Kata was sometimes accused of cheating because of his underperformances at LAN tournaments, but his later FNCS victories – online and in-person – have largely led to the disappearance of such accusations. Since 2024, he has been known to often claim the best loot on the map. Near the ends of tournaments, Kata has often landed at the same spot as the first-placed players, to attempt to prevent them from gaining more points and potentially surpass them.

== Content creation ==
Kata occasionally streams his tournaments on Twitch, and was nominated for the 2024 Fortnite Streamer of the Year – an award eventually won by Clix – at the 2024 Streamer Awards. Kata also has a YouTube channel with over 800,000 subscribers.

On August 8, 2025, a video surfaced of Kata repeatedly using the word nigger. The video was reportedly two years old, meaning Kata was 16 at the time. Upon Kata apologizing, his apology was accused of being AI-generated, sparking further controversy.
