= Pollo (gamer) =

Mexican professional Fortnite player and Fortnite YouTuber. (born 2008)

Personal information
- Name: Miguel Moreno
- Born: May 8, 2008 (age 18)
- Nationality: American-Mexican

Current team
- Team: None
- Game: Fortnite

Career information
- Playing career: 2020–present

Team history
- 2021–2022: Assault
- 2022–2023: Xen
- 2023: Ignite Beyond
- 2023: FUSION
- 2024: Exceed
- 2025–2026: Gentle Mates
- 2026–present: Falcons

Career highlights and awards
- FNCS runner up (2023 – C4S1); FNCS runner up (2024 – C5S1); FNCS champion (2024 – C5S2); FNCS champion (2024 – C5S3); 2024 FNCS Global Championship winner; FNCS champion (2025 – C6S1); FNCS runner up (2025 – C6S3)

Miguel Moreno (born May 8, 2008), better known as Pollo is an American-Mexican professional Fortnite Battle Royale player and YouTuber. Having won four FNCS titles, one of which being the 2024 FNCS Global Championship, he is widely regarded as one of the best Fortnite Battle Royale players of recent years.

== Fortnite career ==
=== 2020–2023: Early career on NA West ===
Playing on the North America West server, Moreno qualified for his first FNCS grand finals in Chapter 2 Season 3. He wouldn't qualify for another until the 2021 FNCS Grand Royale, subsequently qualifying for the next three FNCS grand finals, albeit never placing higher than 15th.

Moreno achieved his highest NA West FNCS placement in Chapter 4 Season 1, placing 2nd alongside Defiable, four points below Thorik and Alexander 'Boltz' Feyzjou.

=== 2023–2025: NA server merge and FNCS success ===
After the merger of servers NA East and West into NA Central for competitive Fortnite Battle Royale, Moreno played FNCS with Sphinx, placing 3rd in Chapter 4 Season 2 and qualifying for the 2023 FNCS Global Championship, earning $34,000 each. The duo then placed 5th in Season 3's FNCS, earning $20,000 each; in the Global Championship grand finals, they won the first match, but ended up placing 16th, splitting $30,000.

In 2024, playing with Peter 'Peterbot' Kata, Moreno placed second in Chapter 5 Season 1's FNCS, earning them $45,000 each. Then, in Chapter 5 Season 2, Moreno and Kata won all weekly Cash Cups leading up to the FNCS grand finals, which they won with a record-breaking point tally, qualifying them for the 2024 Global Championship. Moreno and Kata also won Chapter 5 Season 3's FNCS. Their two consecutive FNCS wins earned them $140,000 each. In September 2024, winning five out of twelve games, Kata and Moreno also won the FNCS Global Championship, earning $200,000 each. Kata and Moreno's performances in 2024 made them widely regarded as the two best players of the year.

Following the competitive game mode switching to trios in late 2024, Moreno won another in Chapter 6 Season 1 with Abdullah 'Acorn' Akhras and Aidan 'Ajerss' Bernero, splitting $180,000 and qualifying for the 2025 FNCS Global Championship. His FNCS victory marked a world record fourth in a row, tied with Brazilian Pedro 'Phzin' Henrique's four from 2021 to 2022. In the beginning of Chapter 6 Season 2, Moreno played with Peter 'Peterbot' Kata and Joshua 'Cold' Butler, despite having already qualified to the Global Championship with Akhras and Bernero. Following a new rule forcing players qualified to the Global Championship to play FNCS with the trios they had qualified with, Moreno returned to his original trio. Moreno, Akhras and Bernero went on to place 5th and 2nd in FNCS Seasons 2–3 respectively, losing the latter to Kata's trio by 3 points. Despite being widely considered favorites to win the 2025 FCNS Global Championship, Moreno's and Kata's trios placed 16th and 15th respectively.

== Style of play ==
Moreno has been considered both a support player and a fragger.
