= Fortnite =

2017 video game

- The logo of Fortnite since 2019
- Genres: Survival, battle royale, sandbox
- Developer: Epic Games (Note: Iron Galaxy co-developed the Xbox One and PlayStation 4 versions in Fortnite: Save the World. Psyonix developed Rocket Racing. Harmonix developed Fortnite Festival.)
- Publisher: Epic Games (Note: Gearbox Software published retail copies of Fortnite: Save the World for Xbox One and PlayStation 4 when the game was first released in July 2017. After the introduction of Battle Royale, Warner Bros. Games published retail copies for PlayStation, Xbox and Nintendo Switch consoles.)
- Platforms: macOS (Note: The iOS and Android clients of Fortnite Battle Royale were removed by Apple and Google respectively on August 13, 2020, as Epic had changed how one could buy V-bucks with the client, leading Epic to file a lawsuit against Apple. In subsequent actions, the courts ruled in April 2025 that Apple cannot block third-party storefronts or take fees from them, and Epic said that they plan to bring Fortnite back to iOS shortly after this ruling. It was returned to the US storefront on May 20, 2025. The iOS version returned for European users via the Epic Game Store following its launch in Europe on August 16, 2024, and it will be available in Brazil in July 2025 and in Japan and the United Kingdom, it is planned for launch in 2025 as well. The macOS client of both Battle Royale and Save the World, while downloadable, will not be able to be updated as well due to app signing restrictions. See Epic Games v. Apple. The game remained playable if one had already downloaded it. On Android, while it is no longer available on Google Play, it remains available via the Samsung Galaxy Store on Samsung Galaxy devices as well as directly from the Epic Games App on all other Android devices. Since May 5, 2022, the game can also be played via Xbox Cloud Gaming and GeForce Now on Android, macOS, iOS and iPadOS devices.); Windows; PlayStation 4; Xbox One; iOS; Nintendo Switch; Android; Xbox Series X/S; PlayStation 5; Nintendo Switch 2
- First release: Fortnite Save the World; July 25, 2017 (early access)
- Latest release: Fortnite Ballistic; December 11, 2024 (early access)

Fortnite is a 2017 online video game and game platform developed and released by Epic Games. It is available in seven distinct game mode versions that otherwise share the same general gameplay and game engine: Fortnite Battle Royale, a battle royale game in which up to 100 players fight to be the last person standing; Fortnite Save the World, a cooperative hybrid tower defense-shooter and survival game in which up to four players fight off zombie-like creatures and defend objects with traps and fortifications they can build; Fortnite Creative, in which players are given complete freedom to create worlds and battle arenas; Lego Fortnite, an open world game collection divided between survival game Lego Fortnite Odyssey and social game Lego Fortnite Brick Life; Fortnite Festival, a rhythm game; Rocket Racing (2023–2026), a racing game; Fortnite Ballistic (2024–2026), a tactical first-person shooter. All game modes are free-to-play.

Save the World and Battle Royale were released in 2017 as early access titles, while Creative was released on December 6, 2018. While Save the World and Creative versions have been successful for Epic Games, Fortnite Battle Royale in particular became an overwhelming success and a cultural phenomenon, drawing more than 125 million players in less than a year and earning hundreds of millions of dollars per month. Fortnite as a whole generated $9 billion in gross revenue up until December 2019, making it one of the highest-grossing media franchises of all time. Since its release, Fortnite has been listed among the greatest video games of all time.

Save the World is available for macOS, PlayStation 4, Windows, and Xbox One, while Battle Royale and Creative were released for all those platforms as well as Android and iOS devices and Nintendo Switch. The game also launched with the release of the ninth-generation PlayStation 5, Xbox Series X/S, and Nintendo Switch 2 consoles. Furthermore, Lego Fortnite, Rocket Racing, Fortnite Festival, and Fortnite Ballistic are available on all platforms. Most game modes support cross-platform play between the various supported devices.

Battle Royale has had 42 continuous seasons and 7 "Chapters" in its lifetime as of November 2026 and is currently in Chapter 7: Treasure Hunters.

== Game modes ==
Fortnite has multiple game modes, using the same engine; each has similar graphics and art assets. Five of these modes are directly created and managed by Epic Games and its subsidiaries:

- Fortnite: Save the World is a player-versus-environment cooperative game, with four players collaborating towards a common objective on various missions while avoiding the effects of an encroaching cataclysmic storm. The players take the role of commanders of home base shelters, collecting resources, saving survivors, and defending equipment that helps to either collect data on the storm or push back the storm. From missions, players are awarded several in-game items, which include hero characters, weapon and trap schematics, and survivors, all of which can be leveled up through gained experience to improve their attributes.
- Fortnite Battle Royale is a player-versus-player game for up to 100 players, allowing one to play alone, in a duo, or in a squad (usually comprising three or four players). Weaponless players airdrop from a "Battle Bus" that crosses the game's map, and then scavenge for weapons, items, and resources while trying to stay alive and to attack and eliminate other players. Over the course of a round, the safe area of the map shrinks in size due to an incoming storm; players outside that threshold take damage and can be eliminated if they fail to quickly evacuate. This forces remaining players into tighter spaces and encourages player encounters until the last player or team is alive. Players can also select Zero Build, a mode that removes building. Alongside these are Ranked options and other modes such as Reload, a 40-player mode which allows players to respawn after dying for a set amount of time on a smaller map, OG, which reintroduces the Chapter 1 map and weapons, and Blitz Royale, a tightly paced, 32-player mode that usually lasts five minutes. Furthermore, "Party Royale" serves as a social space, which hosts various concert events.
- Lego Fortnite is a platform for Lego-based games. The platform originally included four games, however, it now features only two primary games. Odyssey is a survival sandbox game where players play as Lego Minifig versions of characters, as they collect materials, build various buildings, craft various weapons and tools and fight against monsters. Brick Life is a social-based game designed as an age-appropriate Grand Theft Auto game. Lastly, Lego Expeditions was a co-operation action-adventure mode where up to four players can select characters from different hero classes and customize tools and weapons to defeat enemies or complete puzzles. LEGO Fortnite: Expeditions was removed and merged into Lego Fortnite: Odyssey on November 1, 2025. There was also LEGO Fortnite, which was a normal version that released on December 7th, 2023 and got merged with LEGO Fortnite: Expeditions on June 18th, 2025.
- Rocket Racing was a racing game developed by Psyonix and serving as a spin-off title to Rocket League. Players race vehicles, gaining speed boosts from special lane sections or by drifting, as well as the ability to jump and race on vertical and inverted surfaces, while avoiding obstacles on the course. It was removed on October 1, 2026.
- Fortnite Festival is a rhythm game developed by Harmonix, comprising three modes. In the "Main Stage", players play popular hit songs and original tracks created by Harmonix and the Epic Games Sound Team, hitting notes to the rhythm in the Main Stage on one of the four unique parts: Lead, Guitar/Bass, Drums and Vocals, like Harmonix's Rock Band games, while the "Battle Stage" pits sixteen players to get the highest score and survive each round until one player remains. In the "Jam Stage", players cooperate to make remixes, similar to Harmonix's Dropmix and Fuser, using any part of any song within Festival mode, which is also usable in Save the World, Battle Royale, Creative, and Unreal Editor for Fortnite (UEFN). The "Battle Stage" mode was removed on April 16, 2026.
- Fortnite Ballistic was a five-on-five, round-based tactical shooter, comparable to Counter-Strike and Valorant, launched in early access on December 11, 2024. One team must plant and protect a rift device while it is charging from the opposing team that seeks to eliminate them and disarm the device. Between rounds, players can buy in-game weapons and gear with currency earned in previous rounds. Ballistic is the first Epic-developed game on the Fortnite platform to directly support a first-person view. It was removed on April 16, 2026.
- Besides these modes, Fortnite offers the sandbox mode, Fortnite Creative. Within this mode, players are given complete freedom to spawn any item from the Battle Royale game mode on a custom island, and can create games such as battle arenas, race courses, platforming challenges, and more. Furthermore, it also supports Unreal Editor for Fortnite (UEFN), which allows players to edit worlds using Fortnite assets. Creative and UEFN also allow players to create custom Fall Guys and Teenage Mutant Ninja Turtles games, which can be accessible within the Fortnite launcher.

All modes of Fortnite are cross-platform play compatible, requiring users to use an Epic Games account for cross-saving between platforms.

=== V-Bucks ===
All modes are free-to-play; Save the World was pay-to-play until April 2026. The games are monetized through the use of V-Bucks, in-game currency that can be purchased with real-world funds, but also earned through completing missions and other achievements in Save the World. In other modes, V-Bucks can be used to buy cosmetic items such as character models, emotes, or the game's battle pass, a tiered progression of customization rewards for gaining experience and completing certain objectives during a Battle Royale season. The battle pass originally was aimed to support Fortnite Battle Royale, and with the expansion of game modes in 2023, two additional passes were added: the Festival Pass for Fortnite Festival and the Lego Pass for Lego Fortnite, each of which required progression in those modes to receive rewards. In November and December 2024, Epic changed these mechanics, allowing both passes to be progressed through experience points earned in any Fortnite game mode, as well as renaming the Festival Pass to Music Pass. Similarly, the Fortnite Crew, a monthly subscription that paid for the cost of the main battle pass and additional cosmetics, was expanded during the same time to encompass the Music and Lego passes.

At launch, the cost for V-Bucks was about 1000 V-Bucks for US$10, though they are discounted in larger V-Buck bundles. The battle pass, when first introduced, also cost 1000 V-Bucks, and included the ability to reclaim the V-Buck cost along with a smaller amount of V-Bucks. In 2020, Epic reduced the cost of V-Bucks purchases directly in-game or via Epic's website by 20% ($7.99 for 1000 V-Bucks), while still charging $10 for 1000 V-Bucks to both the Google Play Store and Apple App Store, as Epic argued the 30% revenue cut both Google and Apple took from such purchases was excessive. These changes led to two lawsuits, Epic Games v. Google and Epic Games v. Apple, both challenging the respective app store policies and revenue cut. In the case of the Apple suit, Epic was able to secure a ruling requiring Apple to allow in-app steering of users to make purchases through third-party storefronts, like Epic's, while in the Google suit, Epic reached a settlement to reduce the 30% revenue cut on the Play Store.

Epic has since raised the price of V-Bucks twice. The price was increased by about 12.5% in 2023 to offset inflation, with 1000 V-Bucks now costing $8.99 when purchased through Epic's storefront. The second increase in March 2026 was about a 20% increase in cost, with 800 V-Bucks now costing $10. Battle pass costs were also changed to remain at 800 V-Bucks, but contained only just enough V-Buck rewards to recover its cost. Epic claimed these increases were needed because operating costs for Fortnite had increased, and "frees up our teams to continue driving stories and building stuff you love". A large number of players stated they would boycott Fortnite as a result of this increase.

== Development history ==
=== Fortnite: Save the World (2011–2017) ===
Fortnite began from an internal game jam at Epic Games following the publishing of Gears of War 3 around 2011. Though it was not initially one of the developed titles during the jam, the concept of merging the construction game genre, representing games like Minecraft and Terraria, and shooter games arose, leading to the foundation of Fortnite. Development of Fortnite slowed due to several issues, including switching from Unreal Engine 3 to Unreal Engine 4, a deeper role-playing game approach to extend the life of the game, and a switch of art style from a dark theme to a more cartoonish style. Further, Epic was looking to get into the games as a service model, and brought in Chinese publisher Tencent to help; Tencent took a large stake in Epic as part of this, leading to the departure of several executives, including Cliff Bleszinski, who had been a key part of Fortnite's development. Fortnite's approach was changed to be Epic's testbed for games as a service, and further slowed the development.

Epic prepared to release Fortnite as a paid early access title in July 2017, with plans to release it as free-to-play in 2019 while gaining feedback from players to improve the game. With the release of Fortnite Battle Royale, the player-versus-environment mode was distinguished as "Save the World". Ultimately, Epic opted to release Save the World as a premium title, bringing it out of early access on June 29, 2020. Later, Epic announced that Save the World would become free-to-play for most console and computer versions in April 2026.

=== Fortnite Battle Royale (2017–2018) ===
Near the same time that Epic released Fortnite into early access, PlayerUnknown's Battlegrounds had become a worldwide phenomenon, having sold over 5 million copies three months from its March 2017 release and drawing strong interest in the battle royale genre. Epic recognized that with the Fortnite base game, they could also do a battle royale mode, and rapidly developed their own version atop Fortnite in about two months. By September 2017, Epic was ready to release this as a second mode from "Save the World" in the paid-for early access but then later released it as a free game, Fortnite Battle Royale, supported with microtransactions. This version quickly gained players, with over 10 million players during its first two weeks of release, and led Epic to create separate teams to continue the Fortnite Battle Royale development apart from the Save the World version, outside of common engine elements and art assets. This allowed Fortnite Battle Royale to expand to other platforms otherwise not supported by Save the World, including iOS, Android mobile devices, Nintendo Switch, and Nintendo Switch 2.

=== Fortnite Creative (2018–2023) ===
A creative sandbox mode launched on December 6, 2018, synchronized with the start of season 7 of Fortnite Battle Royale. Each player has access to a private, persistent island on which they construct buildings and add and manipulate objects as desired. Players can invite friends to this island and take part in unofficial games such as race tracks or jumping courses. Only players who purchased the battle pass initially received their own island, but a week later, on December 13, players who did not purchase it received access to the game mode for free.

=== Fortnite Experiences (2023–present) ===
In March 2023, Epic released the Unreal Editor for Fortnite (UEFN), a standalone editor for Windows. UEFN allows creators to use the Unreal Editor with features of Unreal Engine 5 and Fortnite assets in developing new modes within the Fortnite Creative mode; this mode was called "Creative 2.0".

In October 2023, Epic redesigned the main Fortnite client to present Epic's own various modes as well as the many creative modes as part of Fortnite Experiences, comparable to Roblox in presentation. This was followed by introducing three new Epic-developed modes for the game in December 2023: Lego Fortnite, a survival game developed with The Lego Group, Rocket Racing, an arcade-style driving game developed by Psyonix, and Fortnite Festival, a rhythm game developed by Harmonix. Each mode was introduced as free-to-play, interfacing with the game's battle pass system and offering new rewards associated with those modes. One recent Epic experience features music by Daft Punk.

Many improvements in UEFN were announced in March 2024, including the addition of Unreal Engine's MetaHuman character rendering technology, and more assets from Lego, Rocket Racing, and Fall Guys. Epic also stated their intent to have future Fortnite Battle Royale seasons starting in late 2025 to be developed in UEFN.

As part of releasing a beta for the Epic Games Launcher in October 2026, Epic said that a native Linux version of Fortnite, including the Easy Anti-cheat protection, is being developed.

== Reception ==
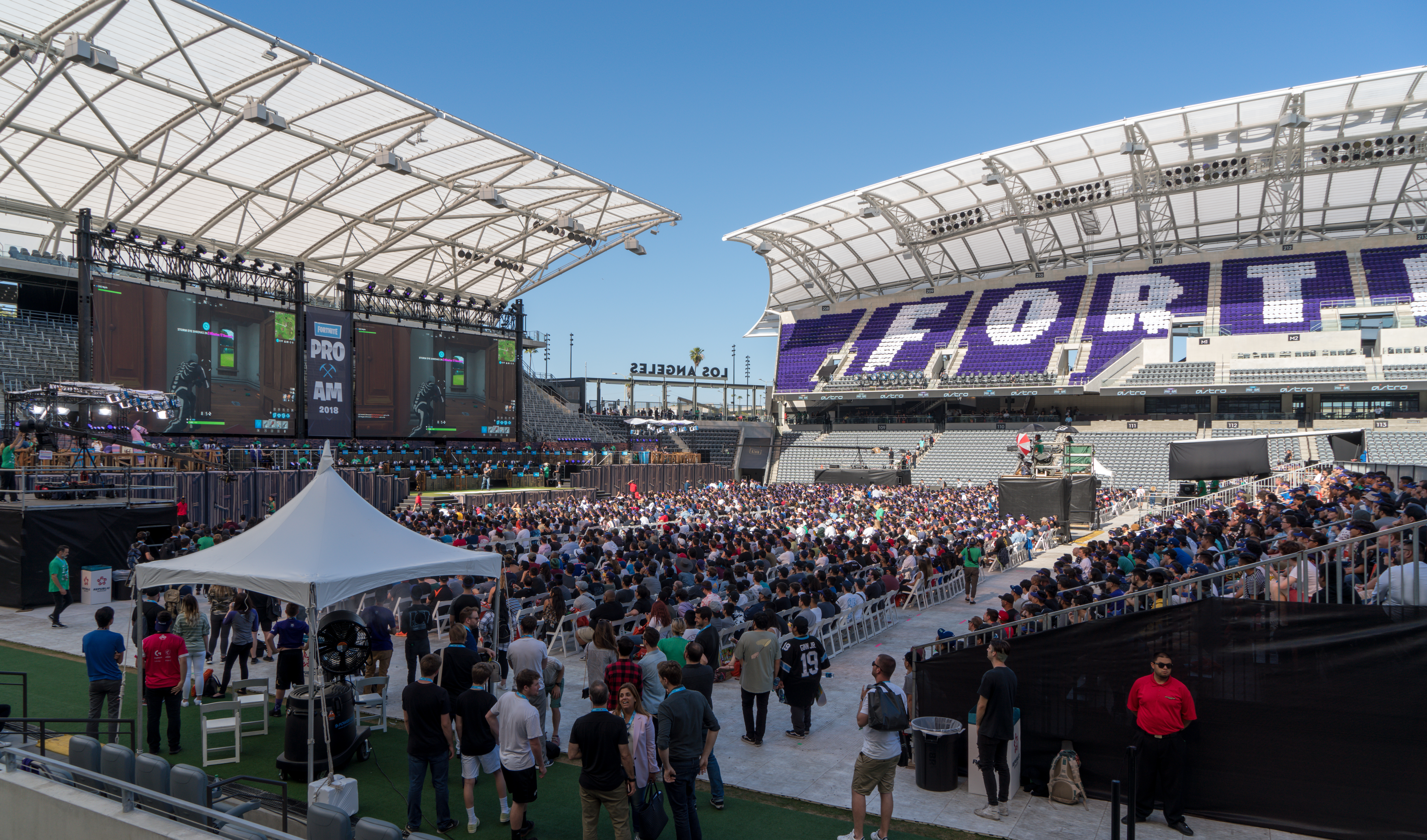
The Fortnite Pro-Am event at E3 2018

The Save the World mode achieved over one million players by August 2017, just before the release of Battle Royale.

Fortnite Battle Royale became a significant financial success for Epic Games, leading them to separate the teams between Save the World and Battle Royale to provide better support for both modes. Within two weeks of release, over 10 million players had played the mode, and by June 2018, just after the Nintendo Switch release, had reached 125 million players. Revenue from Fortnite Battle Royale during the first half of 2018 had been estimated in the hundreds of millions of dollars per month, with total 2018 revenue estimated at $2.4 billion by analysis firm SuperData Research. Total revenue for Fortnite reached more than $9 billion by the end of 2019.

Fortnite Battle Royale has also become a cultural phenomenon, with several celebrities reporting they play the game, and athletes using Fortnite emotes as victory celebrations. A notable streaming event in March 2018, with streamer Ninja playing Fortnite Battle Royale alongside Drake, Travis Scott, Kim DotCom, and Pittsburgh Steelers wide receiver JuJu Smith-Schuster, broke viewership records for Twitch to date, and led to Epic arranging a Fortnite Battle Royale pro–am with 50 pairs of streamers and professional players matched with celebrities at E3 2018 in June 2018. Epic Games has developed organized esports competitions around Fortnite Battle Royale, such as the inaugural US$30 million Fortnite World Cup tournament that took place in July 2019 and the Fortnite Championship Series (FNCS), the latter of which would be organized by Epic Games in 2020 and 2021 before being organized by Blast ApS from 2022 onwards.

There has also been growing concern over Fortnite Battle Royale's draw toward young children, emphasized with the release of the mobile client. Parents and teachers had expressed concern that students are being distracted and drawn away from schoolwork due to playing Fortnite. Concerns have also been raised about the impact that playing a game involving repeated depictions of gun violence may have on young children.

=== Awards ===
In 2017, the game was nominated for "Best Co-op Game" by PC Gamer, and for "Best Spectator Game" by IGN. In 2018, the game won the award for Best Ongoing Game by PC Gamer and IGN, the latter of which nominated it for "Best Nintendo Switch Game", "Best Mobile Game", and "Best Action Game".

Year	Award	Category	Result	Ref(s).
2017	The Game Awards 2017	Best Multiplayer	Nominated	
2018	16th Visual Effects Society Awards	Outstanding Visual Effects in a Real-Time Project (A Hard Day's Night)	Nominated	
2018	21st Annual D.I.C.E. Awards	Outstanding Achievement in Online Gameplay	Nominated	
2018	SXSW Gaming Awards 2018	Excellence in Multiplayer	Nominated	
2018	SXSW Gaming Awards 2018	Excellence in Gameplay	Nominated	
2018	14th British Academy Games Awards	Evolving Game	Nominated	
2018	14th British Academy Games Awards	Multiplayer	Nominated	
2018	2018 Webby Awards	People's Voice Award for Best Multiplayer/Competitive Game	Won	
2018	Game Critics Awards 2018	Best Ongoing Game	Won	
2018	Develop Awards	Best Animation	Nominated	
2018	Teen Choice Awards	Choice Videogame	Won	
2018	BBC Radio 1's Teen Awards	Best Game (Fortnite Battle Royale)	Won	
2018	Golden Joystick Awards 2018	Best Competitive Game	Won	
2018	Golden Joystick Awards 2018	Mobile Game of the Year	Nominated	
2018	Golden Joystick Awards 2018	Ultimate Game of the Year (Fortnite Battle Royale)	Won	
2018	The Game Awards 2018	Best Multiplayer Game	Won	
2018	The Game Awards 2018	Best Mobile Game	Nominated	
2018	The Game Awards 2018	Best Ongoing Game	Won	
2018	The Game Awards 2018	Best Esports Game	Nominated	
2018	Gamers' Choice Awards	Fan Favorite Game	Won	
2018	Gamers' Choice Awards	Fan Favorite Multiplayer Game	Won	
2018	Gamers' Choice Awards	Fan Favorite eSports Game	Won	
2018	Gamers' Choice Awards	Fan Favorite Battle Royale Game	Won	
2018	Gamers' Choice Awards	Fan Favorite eSports League Format (Community Skirmishes)	Won	
2019	22nd Annual D.I.C.E. Awards	Online Game of the Year	Won	
2019	15th British Academy Games Awards	Evolving Game	Won	
2019	15th British Academy Games Awards	Mobile Game	Nominated	
2019	Famitsu Awards	Excellence Prize	Won	
2019	2019 Webby Awards	Best Multiplayer/Competitive Game	Won	
2019	Game Critics Awards 2019	Best Ongoing Game	Nominated	
2019	Golden Joystick Awards 2019	Still Playing	Nominated	
2019	Golden Joystick Awards 2019	eSports Game of the Year	Won	
2019	The Game Awards 2019	Best Ongoing Game	Won	
2019	The Game Awards 2019	Best Community Support	Nominated	
2019	The Game Awards 2019	Best eSports Game	Nominated	
2019	The Game Awards 2019	Best eSports Event (Fortnite World Cup)	Nominated	
2020	16th British Academy Games Awards	Evolving Game	Nominated	
2020	2020 Kids' Choice Awards	Favorite Video Game	Nominated	
2020	The Game Awards 2020	Best Ongoing Game	Nominated	
2020	The Game Awards 2020	Best Community Support	Nominated	
2020	The Game Awards 2020	Best eSports Game	Nominated	
2020	Best of Galaxy Store Awards	Game of the Year 2020	Won	
2021	2021 Kids' Choice Awards	Favorite Video Game	Nominated	
2021	11th Streamy Awards	Brand Engagement	Won	
2022	The Game Awards 2022	Best Community Support	Nominated	
2022	The Game Awards 2022	Best Ongoing Game	Nominated	
2023	The Game Awards 2023	Best Ongoing Game	Nominated	
2024	20th British Academy Games Awards	Evolving Game	Nominated	
2024	20th British Academy Games Awards	EE Game of the Year	Nominated	
2024	Equinox Latam Game Awards	Battle Royale	Won	
2024	Equinox Latam Game Awards	Ongoing Game	Nominated	
2024	The Game Awards 2024	Best Ongoing Game	Nominated	
2024	The Game Awards 2024	Best Community Support	Nominated	
2025	Golden Joystick Awards 2025	Still Playing Award - PC and Console	Nominated	
2025	The Game Awards 2025	Best Ongoing Game	Nominated	
2025	The Game Awards 2025	Best Community Support	Nominated	
2026	Golden Joystick Awards 2026	Still Playing Award - PC & Console	Nominated	
2026	The Streamer Awards 2026	Stream Game of the Year	Nominated	
2026	The Game Awards 2026	Best Ongoing Game	Pending	
