= Fortnite Ballistic =

Canceled video game

- Developer: Epic Games
- Publisher: Epic Games
- Series: Fortnite
- Engine: Unreal Engine 5
- Platforms: Android; Nintendo Switch; Nintendo Switch 2; PlayStation 4; PlayStation 5; Windows; Xbox One; Xbox Series X/S
- Release: December 11, 2024 (early access)
- Genre: Tactical shooter

Fortnite Ballistic was a tactical first-person shooter game mode for Fortnite. It was released into early access on December 11, 2024. It received mixed reviews from critics upon its early access release. It was shut down on April 16, 2026, due to low player engagement.

== Gameplay ==
Ballistic was a tactical first-person shooter accessible via the Fortnite launcher. In the mode, two teams of five players compete against each other across several rounds, with one team aiming to plant a "Rift Point Device" at a designated location on the map, and the other team attempting to stop them. When a player is killed, they cannot respawn until the next round; the round can also be won based on which team is the last one standing. In-between rounds, players can purchase weapons and other types of equipment to use against enemy players, such as pistols, shotguns, and grenades. Similar to other tactical shooters, like the Counter-Strike series and Valorant, the guns are more accurate when players are standing still. The first team to win seven rounds wins the match.

== Release ==
Ballistic was first announced via a blog post on December 7, 2024, before being released into early access on December 11. It was made available on all platforms Fortnite itself was available on and released with one map, "Skyline 10". Alongside the modes early access release, Epic stated that the mode will receive updates over time to expand upon its content. Upon the mode's release, it immediately began facing server issues caused by an influx of players attempting to play it. On March 24, 2026, Epic Games announced Fortnite Ballistic would shut down on April 16, 2026 due to low player engagement.

== Reception ==
Opinions on Ballistic upon its initial early access release were mixed. Jake Tucker of PC Gamer was very critical of the mode in its initial state, calling it a "disappointment" that "doesn't work for a bunch of different reasons". He highlighted what he felt was a lack of content at launch, wishing for more variety in the weapon selection, while also criticizing the mode's movement and what he felt was unrewarding gameplay. He further described the mode as a "featureless porridge of its influences, garnished with Fortnite theming." Polygon's Ana Diaz shared similar thoughts, viewing the game itself as unpolished and criticized its server issues, though she felt that there was a good basis for a first-person shooter game present. Kotaku's Zack Zwiezen believed that Ballistic itself was unfinished and "rough around the edges", though felt that the mode was still enjoyable and demonstrated that Epic Games could create a good first-person shooter experience within Fortnite.
