= Fortnite Save the World =

Co-op sandbox survival game developed by Epic Games

- Developer: Epic Games (Note: People Can Fly assisted in the game's development, while Iron Galaxy co-developed the Xbox One and PlayStation 4 versions.)
- Publisher: Epic Games (Note: Retail versions published by Gearbox Software)
- Director: Darren Sugg
- Artist: Pete Ellis
- Composer: Rom Di Prisco
- Series: Fortnite
- Engine: Unreal Engine 5
- Platforms: macOS (Note: Due to the Epic Games v. Apple lawsuit, Epic could no longer update the macOS client for Save the World after September 23, 2020, making it effectively unplayable.); PlayStation 4; Windows; Xbox One; Xbox Series X/S; PlayStation 5; Nintendo Switch 2
- Release: June 29, 2020: macOS, PlayStation 4, Windows, Xbox One; June 29, 2020; Xbox Series X/S; November 10, 2020; PlayStation 5; November 12, 2020; Nintendo Switch 2; April 16, 2026
- Genres: Third-person shooter, survival, tower defense
- Modes: Single-player, multiplayer

Fortnite Save the World is a looter shooter survival video game produced by Epic Games, part of the game Fortnite. It is a cooperative and sandbox-style game with elements of tower defense and played in hybrid-third-person, described by Epic as a cross between Minecraft and Left 4 Dead. The game was initially released as a paid-for early access title for macOS, PlayStation 4, Windows, and Xbox One on July 25, 2017, with plans for a full free-to-play release announced in late 2018. Epic eventually opted to move the game to pay-to-play in June 2020, discontinuing major development on it to focus on the larger Fortnite game, before finally going free-to-play in April 2026, along with release on the Nintendo Switch 2. The retail versions of the game were published by Gearbox Software, while online distribution of the PC versions is handled by Epic's launcher.

Fortnite is set on contemporary Earth, where the sudden appearance of a worldwide storm causes 98% of the world's population to disappear, and zombie-like creatures rise to attack the remainder. Considered by Epic as a cross between Minecraft and Left 4 Dead, Fortnite has up to four players cooperating on various missions on different maps to collect resources, build fortifications around defensive objectives that help fight the storm and protect survivors, and construct weapons and traps to engage in combat with waves of these creatures that attempt to destroy the objectives. Players gain rewards through these missions to improve their hero characters, support teams, and arsenal of weapons and trap schematics, to take on more difficult missions.

The game was initially supported through microtransactions to purchase a virtual currency known as V-Bucks, which could be spent on loot boxes that yielded valuable rewards. A standalone battle royale game, Fortnite Battle Royale, was released for the same platforms in September 2017. Epic eventually removed paid loot boxes, instead opting to support the game via direct purchase of cosmetics in the Battle Royale item shop. Following the release, the player-versus-environment mode was officially distinguished as "Save the World".

== Synopsis ==
One day, 98% of Earth's human population suddenly disappeared, and the remaining humans found the skies covered in dense clouds, creating chaotic storms that dropped husks: humanoid zombie-like creatures that attacked the living. The survivors constructed "storm shields", a field that cleared the storm clouds from immediately overhead and reduced the attacks from husks, and used these to set up survivor bases across the globe. The player is a commander of one of these bases, charged with going out of the storm shield to find resources, survivors, and other allies to help expand their storm shield and return Earth to its normal state.

== Gameplay ==
The "tower defense" aspect of the game revolves around the player character defending the storm shield against zombie-like creatures.

Fortnite Save the World is described as a unique blend of sandbox survival co-op lite RPG tower defense game, and is an amalgamation of player progression, exploration, scavenging items, sharing scarce resources, crafting weapons, building fortified structures, and fighting waves of encroaching monsters. Tim Sweeney, Epic Games' founder, described the game as "Minecraft meets Left 4 Dead".

The game is played from a third-person perspective. Up to four players cooperate in various missions to collect resources, build fortifications around defensive objectives that help fight the storm and protect survivors, and construct weapons and traps to engage in combat with waves of these creatures that attempt to destroy the objectives. Players gain rewards through these missions to improve their hero characters, support teams, and arsenal of weapons and trap schematics to take on more difficult missions.

=== Quests and events ===
Players can review their current story progress and quests, which can include daily, weekly, side, challenge, and event quests, which when completed provide in-game currency or resources.

Fortnite Save the World offers themed events with a unique progression line, new locations, and rewards based on those themes. The first such event was its Halloween event, "Fortnitemares", which offered Halloween-themed heroes, characters, weapons, and traps (usable outside the event) by completing many objectives.

=== Map and missions ===
Missions are divided among four world locations - Stonewood, Plankerton, Canny Valley, and Twine Peaks, which become available only after progressing far enough in the story. During timed events and the Survive the Storm mode, special locations are added. Within a location are several possible mission areas that show the type of mission, the terrain it takes place on, its difficulty rating relative to the player's current power level, and whether the mission is currently under special "storm" conditions that throw random effects, like buffed husks or mini-bosses, into the mission but have potentially better rewards if completed. The player can select a special "play with others" option that automatically matches them with players at a similar power level and story progression on a random mission for added rewards.

During missions, players can make their fortifications from one of three base materials (wood, brick, and metal), and in several configurations, including floors/ceilings, walls, stairs, and ramps; players can edit these for more configurations, such as adding a door or window to a wall. Each fortification part can be upgraded with more resources of the same type to improve its durability, and when they are damaged, can be repaired by spending additional resources. Traps, which have a few activations before they fall apart, can be placed on floors, walls, and ceilings, and arranged in ways to make them more lethal or effective against husks. Traps may also include beneficial resources for players, such as healing pads, defender posts, and launch pads. Similarly, players can use a range of weapons, but these have limited durability that depletes as they are used or as a penalty if the player should be downed by husks and need to respawn without the help of allies. Players can construct new weapons, ammo, and traps from gathered resources, or find these by searching containers across the map. During missions, the game progresses through an accelerated day-night cycle; during the day, the husks are more passive and rarely pose immediate threats, while during the night, bands of husks may spawn in and will aggressively seek players.

Most missions take place on procedurally generated landscapes. Most missions are based on locating sites representing the objectives on the map, building fortifications around those locations, and then facing off against several waves of husks that will try to destroy the objectives. During completion of these missions, players are generally given a "storm forecast" to know where husks will spawn in as to enhance fortification in that direction, though this direction can change in more difficult missions. Other missions are time-limited, requiring the players to locate and help many survivors, build several radar towers, or clear out various encampments of husks scattered around the map before time runs out. These missions encourage the players to explore the map and farm for resources (either by searching objects or destroying them with an axe) used to build the fortifications, weapons, ammunition, and traps needed to defend or attack the husks. Players also frequently need to seek BluGlo, a special resource that does not carry over between maps to activate certain mission objectives. Some missions are considered a loss if the objective is destroyed or time runs out, while other missions allow the players to rework their fortifications and start their defense again if the objective is destroyed. Maps will frequently have optional objectives that are discovered through exploration, such as human survivors that need help. Completing these successfully earns immediate in-game rewards such as resources, weapons, and traps. Missions themselves may provide bonus objectives, such as by completing the mission within a certain in-game period, using a few fortification pieces, or saving more survivors than the minimum necessary, which affects the quality of rewards the players receive after the successful completion of the main mission.

One unique mission type is Storm Shield Defense (SSD) missions. In each of the four world locations, the player is allocated a map that remains persistent, representing the site where their base's storm shield generator is placed, and in the storm mode, the player must return to this map to expand the storm shield, requiring them to add a new objective to defend successfully to continue the story. At any time, the player can enter this map without starting the defense mission and use their carried-over resources to build out the fortifications and traps, or add resources to a special storage area for this map. Successfully completing SSD-missions unlocks "Endurance Mode", which allows players to test their skills and builds against an increasingly difficult and unending siege on their base.

=== Command and armory ===
The player has a roster of hero characters, defender characters, and support characters (called Survivors). Hero characters represent characters from one of four classes that the player can use while on a mission, as well as used to undertake resource-gathering missions, making them unavailable to use until they return from the mission. Defender characters can be summoned to help with defense, but only if there are fewer than four players on a mission. Support characters (called "Survivors", who must be rescued in game) are used to form various non-playable squads that provide passive bonuses to the player's attack strength, building speed, armor, and health, with additional benefits if the player can match certain characterization attributes within a squad.

The player can spend commander upgrade skill points, earned by completing missions, and technology research points, earned over time, to unlock new base support skills, gadgets, and tools. These can improve a player's base attributes, attributes that are shared with other players while on missions, unlock higher levels of evolution for schematics and characters, open up new squad positions, or unlock general skills that players can use in the field. Collectively, the player's progress on the commander rating, their survivor squad composition, and their selected hero character make up the player's current "power level", which relates to what difficulty of missions the player should take and the game's matchmaking services.

The player has an itemization inventory of weapon and trap schematics, along with collected resources. The crafting schematics are used to construct weapons and traps when on the field. The player can spend different types of experience points and resources earned as mission rewards to level up and evolve schematics and characters. For weapons and traps, this generally boosts their effectiveness as well as unlocking additional attribute "perk" bonuses, while leveling up hero characters will increase stats and unlock special skills the character has while in the field. Schematics and characters are generally assigned a rarity, which determines how much they can be leveled and evolved. A player's inventory of schematics and characters is limited, but players can opt to slot anyone they do not need into a collection book to gain rewards when certain collection sets are completed; use one or more of these schematics or characters to transform them into a new random item, or simply retire them to gain back experience points and other resources to free up the inventory slots.

=== Locker, store and item shop ===
The player has access to a complete gallery of all Fortnite cosmetic items across all gameplay modes, featuring outfits, back bling, and harvesting tools. The player can spend real-world currency and/or different in-game currencies, experience points, and resources earned as mission rewards, from loot boxes (represented as llama piñatas), or other resources to level up and evolve schematics and characters.

Heroes in the player's locker have different power levels and abilities, which can be increased either by upgrading them or by enhancing their support team with Survivor XP or Hero XP. The upgrades, however, are locked until certain quests are completed, such as the Storm Shield Defense missions. Heroes also come in different rarities, but unlike the Battle Royale counterpart, the rarity of a hero can be upgraded further using Hero XP and other account resources such as Epic or Legendary Flux that can be obtained either from the weekly shop, or by completing some missions.

Although most cosmetics earned in Fortnite Battle Royale can be used in Fortnite Save the World, there are some that cannot. These include all gliders, all contrails, and some backblings. Reactivity for some backblings may not work in Save the World either. Epic Games has sparked some controversy among players when a Save the World exclusive hero (Metal Team Leader) was made available in the Fortnite Battle Royale item shop as a skin. Some players felt ripped off by Epic Games' decision as they've already purchased the item in Save the World which was taunted to be rare.

== Development ==
=== History ===
==== Conception ====
Fortnite was revealed at the 2011 Spike Video Game Awards (VGA), with Epic's former design director Cliff Bleszinski introducing a trailer for the game. Donald Mustard, creative lead at Epic, said in 2017 that this announcement was "three weeks after we came up with the idea, before we even made the game". The title, which started out as an internal game jam project following the completion of Gears of War 3, represents a departure from the company's previous work. As Bleszinski explained during the Spike event, Epic wanted to "switch things up a little bit and do something different and fun" with Fortnite, describing it as "a world where you explore, you scavenge, you build and ultimately you survive." In an interview with Engadget, he also echoed these statements, claiming that the game would differ from the Gears of War series: "There's no dudebros in it...Not that there's anything wrong with that, right? But creatively for the team, Gears has been amazing for us. But it's fun to kind of stretch our wings and do something that's a little different from the usual." At the time of its creation, producer Roger Collum said that the game grew out of taking two popular genres: building games like Minecraft and Terraria, and shooting games like Gears of War, to make something novel, comparing it to making peanut butter cups out of peanut butter and chocolate. When they showed this approach to other developers, they found that the concept was an idea that others had had but never worked towards any final product, and from that knew they had something with potential to build on.

As the game was in its very preliminary stages at the VGA reveal, the goal of this reveal was to seek public interest in the title and potential publishing partners to decide on the game's release platforms and timeframe. During the July 2012 San Diego Comic-Con, Epic announced that Fortnite would be an exclusive personal computer title, and the first one to be developed by Epic using their new Unreal 4 game engine, with a planned release in 2013. The game's development was originally started in the Unreal 3 engine, but as they progressed, they had seen the opportunity to work in several of the new feature sets and scripting language offered by Unreal 4 for Fortnite, while still running on most personal computers at that time. They further opted for personal computer exclusivity to avoid the difficulty of having to go through console certification, and as they planned to be constantly monitoring and tweaking the game, acting as a dungeon master, the personal computer approach would allow them to do this without restrictions normally set by console manufacturers. Bleszinski later clarified that they would not rule out a release on other platforms as they developed the title.

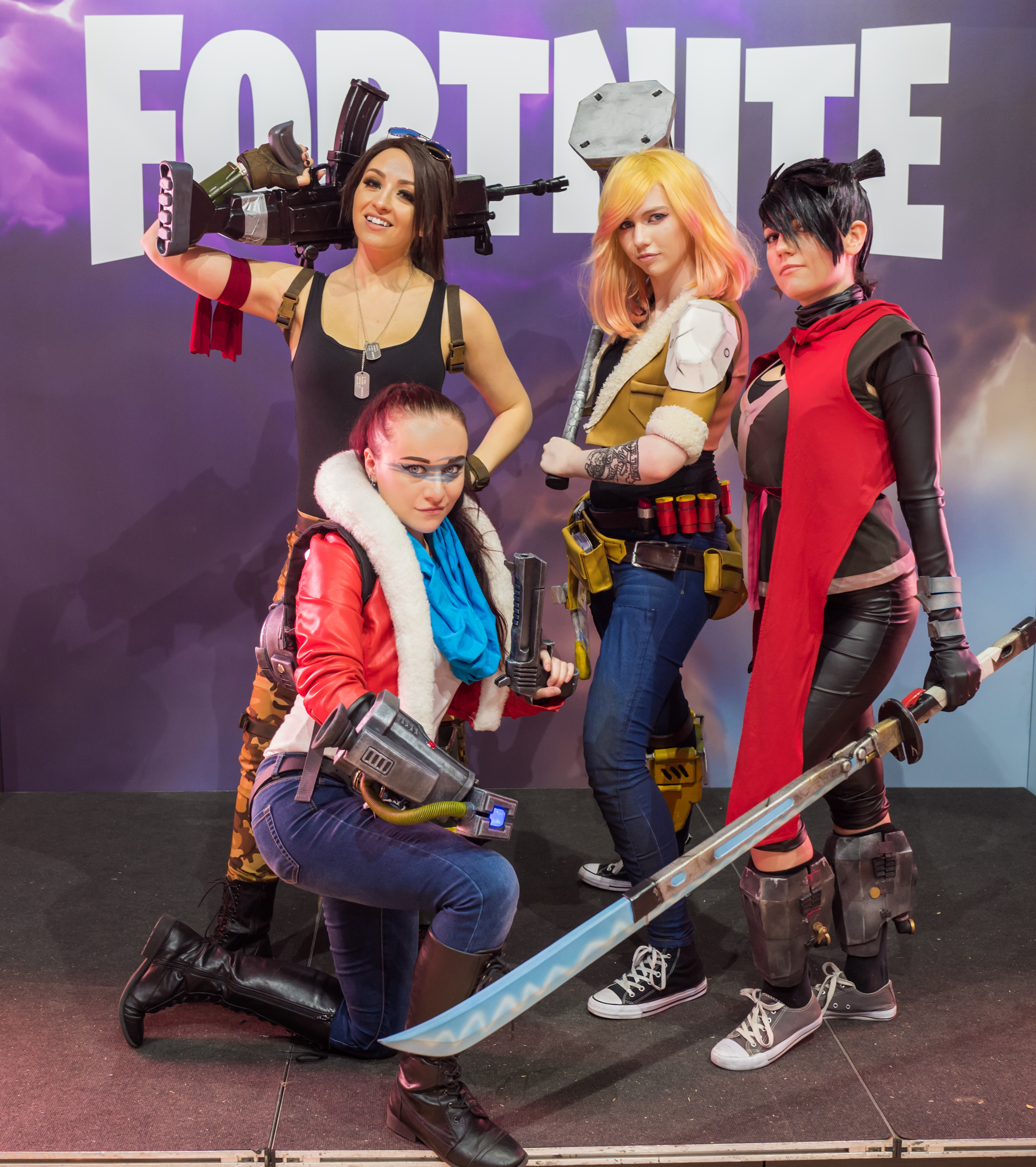
Fortnite cosplayers at Gamescom 2017

Fortnite's development was spread among several of Epic's satellite studios, and was also co-developed by the Polish studio People Can Fly, which had worked with Epic previously on earlier games, and had been fully acquired by Epic sometime in 2012. People Can Fly were briefly renamed Epic Games Poland in 2013 to align with Epic's other studios. By March 2014, there were about 90 developers working on the game. People Can Fly later returned to being an independent studio and their own name in 2015, but continued to help Epic with Fortnite's development.

==== Transition under Tencent ====
Fortnite's early development hit several roadblocks. First, Epic began using Fortnite as the testing ground for the new Unreal Engine 4, which slowed some development. A further factor recognized was that to maintain interest in the game, it needed to have deep systems for player progression and itemization, similar to computer role-playing games. They reached out and brought in system designers from popular massively multiplayer online games, including Darren Sugg, to gain input on how to create these types of systems. A culminating issue in the slowdown was the investment from Tencent in Epic Games in 2012, which transitioned many high-level executives, including Bleszinski, out of the company. Epic had recognized they needed to prepare for offering games that followed the games as a service model. Tencent had excelled at this in China and agreed to help Epic for significant ownership in Epic. Epic used Fortnite as the spearhead for Epic's games-as-a-service model, which created additional hurdles, according to Mustard. Further, with the transition of executives, new leadership was needed to take over for Fortnite's development team. Sugg, for example, had been discussing the various game systems in depth with Bleszinski, who otherwise was leading the design. With Bleszinski's departure, Sugg had to take over as lead design to continue the vision that Bleszinski's team had. Rod Fergusson, who had left Epic after Tencent's investment in 2012, stated that if he had stayed on with Epic, he would likely have cancelled Fortnite by this point.

At the same time, Epic made several gameplay decisions that established the basis of Fortnite. Initially, when players placed walls and other fortifications, they would have had players complete a mini-game to complete the construction. They found that the game was more successful when these fortifications built themselves, allowing players to create forts quickly, and kept this approach. They could also bring in various game modes that had been envisioned in Gears of War 3, but which then were limited by the game's engine. The dynamic nature of the game world due to players' fortifications and de-construction required them to come up with an artificial intelligence pathfinding solution for the enemies. Epic considered they were trying to build a toolkit for players to interact with to create emergent gameplay solutions based on the situation of the missions, from which they can continue to expand upon with new items throughout the life of the game.

By November 2013, Epic confirmed that Fortnite would not release that year, nor offered a target release date, though affirmed the game was still in development by several of its studios. Epic Games Vice President of Publishing Mike Fischer said in 2015 that Epic recognized that they "announced this game too soon", and that its lengthy development period was due to "very good reasons." Fortnite was featured in the May 2014 issue of Game Informer, revealing that the title would be released as a free-to-play game.

By 2014, Fortnite was at a "pretty functional prototype" with most of the Unreal 4 engine elements smoothed out, according to Mustard. Epic anticipated it would still take about three more years to complete, not only in polishing and balancing the game, but setting in place the necessary backend elements for the games-as-a-service model. To help support development and get player feedback, Epic used a series of closed alpha test periods. The game's first closed alpha, called Online Test 1, ran from December 2 to 19, 2014, while Online Test 2 ran from March 24 to April 14, 2015. Epic said the first alpha was designed to help it "make sure all of our basic systems are working" and establish "a baseline for how people play in order to make Fortnite better." After being demoed at WWDC 2015 on Mac, Fortnite entered closed beta testing in the fall of 2015. Approximately 50,000 players took part in these periods.

Fortnite was being developed alongside Paragon, which Epic announced in November 2015. As Paragon seemed to take Epic's focus, leaving little news about Fortnite, CEO Tim Sweeney said in March 2016 that they were still committed to Fortnite once Paragon was launched and established, given that much of the work on Fortnite would take time to get the right balance for gameplay. "We figure we should start with one major successful launch and do one at a time. Fortnite will be next."

==== Early access release and Battle Royale spinoff ====
By June 2017, Epic Games announced that Fortnite was now set for a 2018 release across Windows, macOS, and the PlayStation 4 and Xbox One consoles. Leading up to this free-to-play release, the game was offered as a paid early access period starting on July 25, 2017, for all platforms; players who pre-ordered Founder's Packs were granted access to the game on July 21. The lengthy period since the game's alpha phases was ascribed to developing Fortnite as a games-as-a-service model, according to creative lead Donald Mustard. While the game had been in a playable state for the two years before this, Epic wanted to develop ongoing content to players to keep them interested in the title, such as planning timed events with unique rewards, following the approach used by games like League of Legends and Warframe. Since the game had already been announced earlier in 2014 through Game Informer, Epic opted not to use their Electronic Entertainment Expo time or space in June 2017 to re-announce the game, fearing that coverage of it would be lost in the deluge of other gaming news coming out of the event. Instead, the Epic marketing team worked with Twitch and other game streamers to provide them with early copies of the game to play and promote on their channels in the weeks leading up to their target release date of July 25, 2017. However, a few weeks before this date, Epic recognized that the game was still not ready for release; it was playable but not content-complete. Rather than prolonging it further, Epic decided to release the game into paid early access on July 25, 2017, which would also allow them to get active feedback on the game as they progressed in development. At the time of the start of early access, Gearbox Software helped distribute the game on physical media.

With the popularity of Fortnite Battle Royale, which was first released in early access around September 2017 and gained considerable attention by early 2018, Epic split off a separate development team to focus on improvements for this mode. Epic said that their attention to Fortnite was causing some of their other games to see lower player populations, leading them to reduce development efforts on these games, particularly Paragon. By the end of January 2018, Epic announced it was shutting down Paragon by April of that year, providing refunds to all players. Players on a Fortnite-dedicated Reddit forum had expressed concerns that a similar fate could befall the Save the World mode of Fortnite, as externally, the Save the World mode has not received the same attention in providing updates and improvements compared to the Battle Royale mode since that mode's release. Epic's Ed Zobrist said that as of March 2018 that the retention rates for "Save the World" have been high, and have grown since the release of Fortnite Battle Royale, and the company has since improved communications with the player base, such as providing development road maps and known bug lists.

In October 2018, Epic announced that the game's free-to-play release would not happen until at least 2019, which was done to ensure that it would be ready to accommodate large groups of new players. A significant patch for the game to be released in November 2018 aims to rework much of the game's metagame interfaces, providing some automation and helpful advice through newly introduced characters for hero outfitting, survivor squads, and other activities. A change in its loot box system was made in January 2019, which allowed players to know what items they would get from the "loot llamas" purchased via the in-game store, similar to an x-ray; contents of such loot llamas will be randomized daily.

==== Final release ====
On June 29, 2020, Epic announced that they had decided to end Save the World's early access period and make it a full release, but abandoning the original free-to-play plans and keeping the game a premium title. With this change, they could no longer support common shared items between the Save the World and Battle Royale modes of Fortnite. With this, Epic planned to include Ventures, season-long events to give players new challenges in the Save the World mode alongside recurring annual events. Long-term players of the Save the World mode criticized Epic for this change; they had long seen the mode receive less care than Fortnite Battle Royale with many features that had been planned now dropped, and that the game's campaign that was to have had taken place over four major acts was effectively only 75% complete and appeared to be no longer a priority. A campaign hashtag "#SaveSaveTheWorld" grew among both these players as well as sympathetic Fortnite Battle Royale players to convince Epic to put more development resources into this mode.

Following a series of teasers, Epic Games announced that Save the World will become free-to-play on April 16, 2026, alongside releasing this mode for the Nintendo Switch 2. The game was eventually made free-to-play on April 16, 2026.The mode will be using Unreal Engine 5 to align with the rest of Fortnite. Those players that had purchased Fortnite at launch will be able to continue earning V-bucks through daily missions, story quests, and mission alerts.

=== Art and design ===
In their initial prototypes of the game, Epic had used creepier and darker designs for the husks and other enemies, and many of the elements of the settings were assets pulled from both Gears of War and Unreal series, which further created a dark, depressing environment. Bleszinski said that they found this to create an "exhaustive environment" that was too grim, and designed to take the design in a more cartoonish approach, while remaining creepy, so that players would enjoy spending time in the game's world, without competing with games like DayZ. They used works from Pixar, Tim Burton, and Looney Tunes as inspiration for the designs.

Fortnite uses procedural generation to build out the maps for each mission. The game also includes an "AI director" that monitors how players are progressing and alters the challenges of the monsters it sends out to the players based on that progression, easing off if players are having greater difficulty in surviving. At one point, the game had a team-based player versus player mode, where each side attempted to build up a base around a central target while trying to attack the opponent's target after breaking through their base. This did not make it into the final game.

Epic has cross-platform play between PC and PS4 and has stated plans to allow separate Fortnite cross-platform support for Xbox One and personal computer users, but cross-platform play between all three platforms has not been announced. However, for a few hours during one day in September 2017, players found they could cross-play between all three platforms. Epic later corrected this, calling it a "configuration error".

== Reception ==
Reception

Aggregate score
Aggregator	Score
Metacritic	PC: 81/100; PS4: 78/100; XONE: 85/100

Review scores
Publication	Score
PC Gamer (US)	55/100
Polygon	7.5/10

=== Sales ===
On July 26, 2017, it was announced that Fortnite had sold over 500,000 digital pre-order copies. On August 18, 2017, Epic confirmed that Fortnite had surpassed over a million players.

=== Legal issues ===
Following the addition of x-ray loot boxes in February 2019, Epic Games was the subject of a class-action lawsuit claiming that its former model for loot boxes was predatory because they did not report the odds which rare items would appear in these boxes. Epic offered to settle the case in February 2021, besides retaining about $26 million to substantiated claims from members of the class particularly to minors affected by the case, by also crediting all players of Save the World with 1,000 V-bucks (about $8 equivalent), with Epic's lawyers stating "it's the right thing to do and we feel strongly about random item loot boxes".
