= DropMix =

2017 music mixing video game

- Developer: Harmonix
- Publisher: Hasbro
- Platforms: iOS, Android
- Release: NA: September 20, 2017
- Genres: Rhythm, card game, music video game
- Modes: Single-player, multiplayer

DropMix is a music mixing game developed by Harmonix and published by Hasbro, launched in 2017 but discontinued. The game used physical cards with chips embedded with near field communication, a specialized electronic game board with NFC and Bluetooth capabilities, and a companion application for mobile devices (iOS or Android) that communicates with the board via Bluetooth. By playing a card, representing a song, on a board space, the board will detect its NFC code and relay that to the app, which will play a sample from that song, such as a drum loop or a vocal section. With multiple cards on the board, the app manages how all the current songs are mixed as played through the app, creating a mashup. The game had several game modes for single and multi-player play, and additional cards, featuring more song samples, could be purchased as booster packs.

The app was removed from the iOS and Android app stores on December 14, 2022.

== Gameplay ==
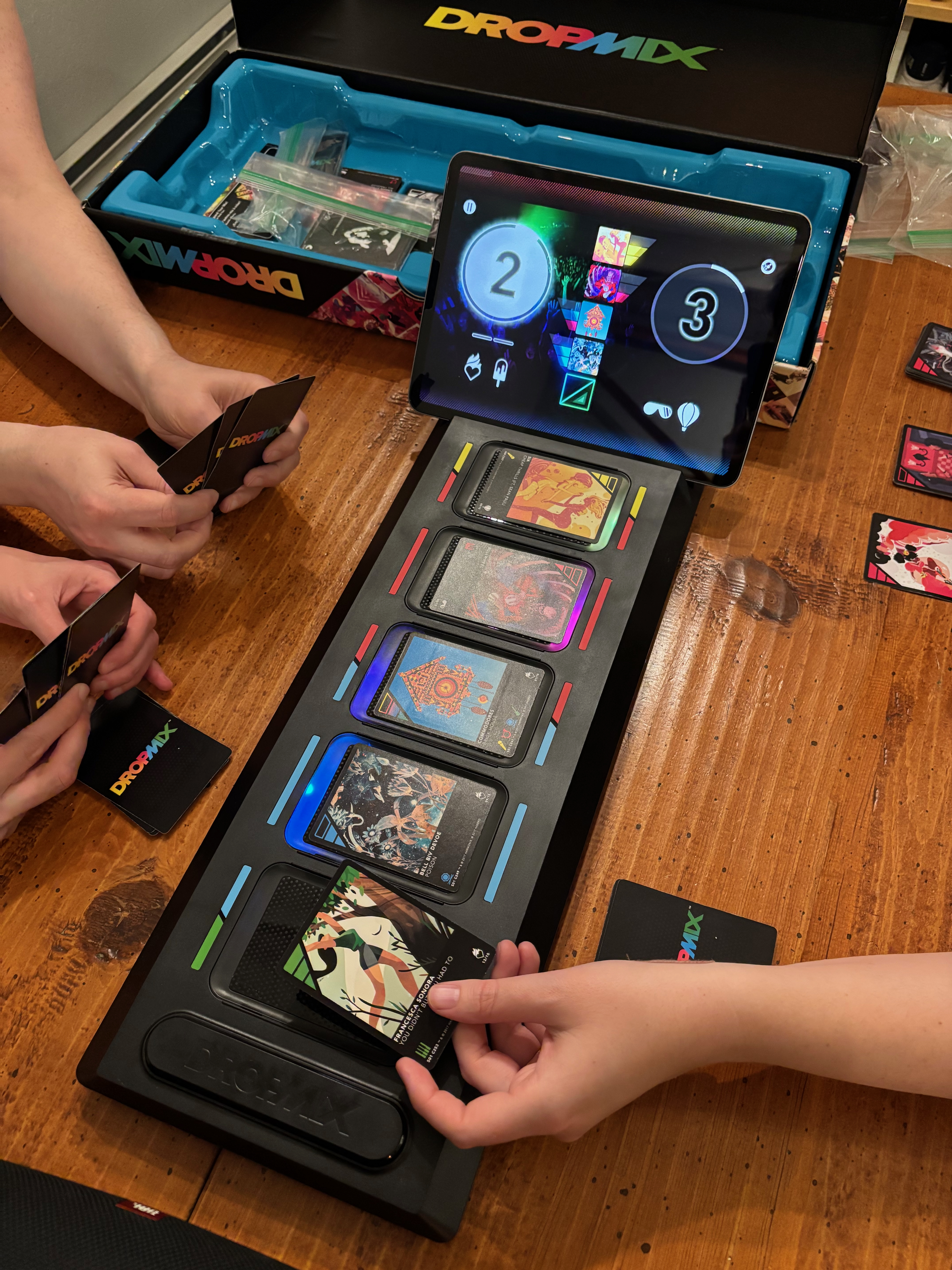
DropMix in multiplayer "Clash" mode

DropMix comes in a core package that includes 60 NFC-equipped cards, each representing a different song, and an electronic game board with five marked spaces. The game also requires a mobile device that can communicate with the board through Bluetooth through a free app. Additional cards enabling new music samples within the app could be purchased separately as booster packs, the price depending on the number of cards available.

Each card is keyed to at least one of four colors, the colors representative of the instrument that can be sampled from that song. For example, yellow represents vocal tracks, while blue represents drum tracks. The board's five spaces are similarly marked by color, with three of the five spaces accepting cards of two different colors. Placing a card on a space with a matching color will cause that track sample to be used as part of the app's current mix; non-matching placement will have no effect. In addition, each card has a power level marking from one to three. In the app, this represents how much an influence the sample will have on the ongoing mix in terms of its speed, key or length. A card with 3 power will have a pronounced impact on the current mix compared to a card with a power of 1. Cards can be played on top of other cards or removed from the board, the app playing the sample only from the top-most card. Special white cards can be played on any space, which can cause an entire change in the speed and key of the ongoing loop.

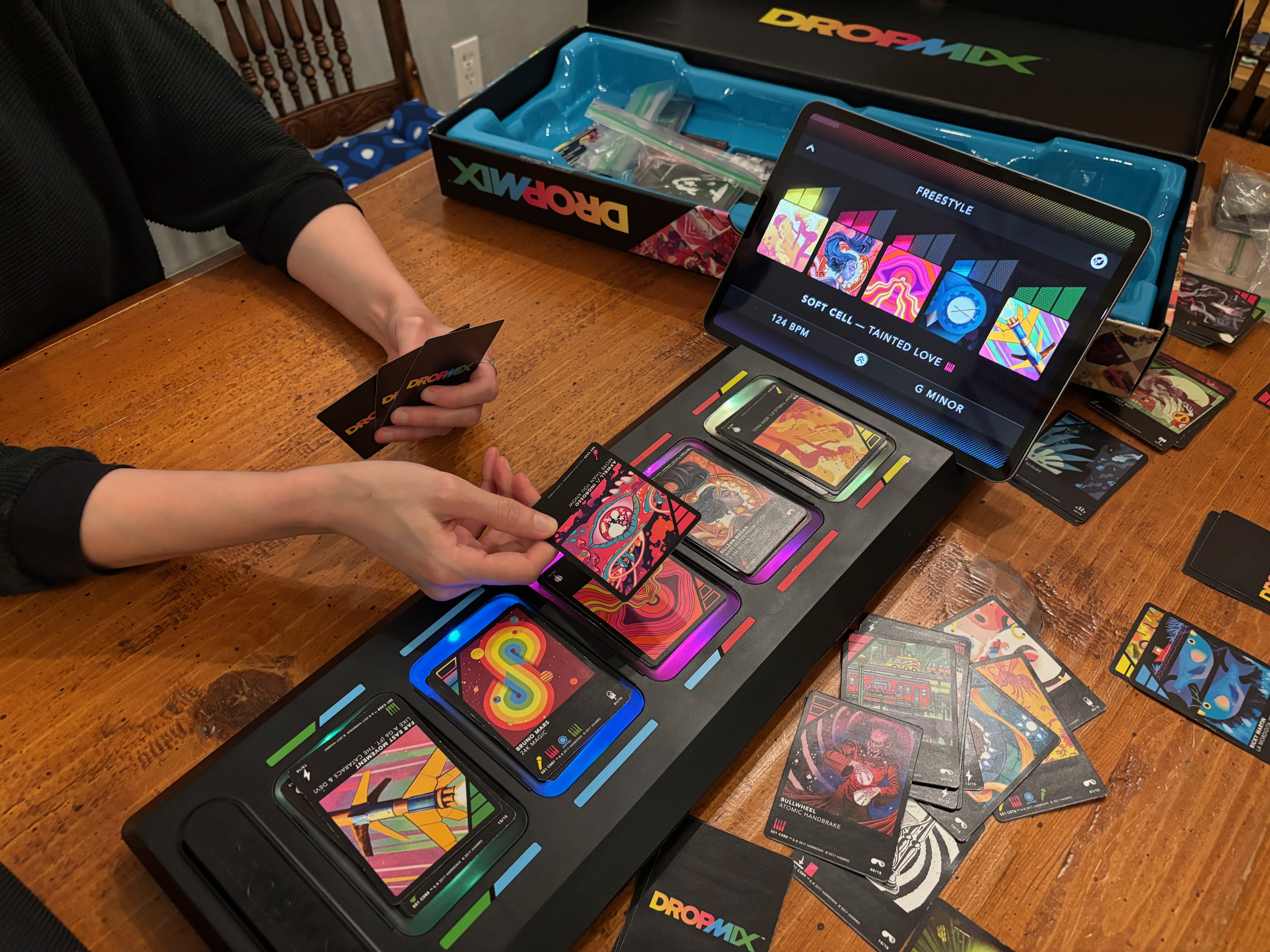
DropMix in "Freestyle" mode

The app provides four game modes as of August 2018. "Freestyle" mode lets players simply try to combine the cards in various mixes without any other rules or scoring goals. In "Clash", two teams of either one or two players prepare card hands. Taking turns, each player plays a card by color as instructed by the app, but may only play a card of greater power than one already present (if such is the case). If they can, they earn points; if they are unable to, they hit a button on the game board which has the app determine cards to be removed from the game board to keep the game going. In "Party" mode, one to five players split the available cards between them, and taking turns, must try to respond to specific "requests" provided by the app in the fastest time, with score penalties if they play incorrectly. A patch released in August 2018 introduced "Puzzle" Mode, a solo game that combines the special actions of "Clash" mode with features of "Party" mode point building by using cards and the DropMix spinner to clear board elements.

The game's soundtrack consists of licensed songs, as well as original compositions by Harmonix Music. At any time, players can save the current mix to the app and share that through social media.

Cards are organized into "playlists." Each playlist contains 15 cards. The Starter Pack comes with the board and 4 playlists. Dropmix cards can be purchased in one of two forms: Playlist Packs and Discover Packs. With Playlist Packs, you will receive 16 cards. 15 of the cards are listed (and make up a playlist) and the additional card is hidden and part of the Baffler playlist. With Discover Packs, there are 4 series. There are 6 packs of 5 cards per pack. The only way to distinguish packs from one another is from the images on the fronts of the packs, but each pack contains a specific set of cards. Each Series includes 30 cards (in total), and will complete only half of 4 playlist. 2 Discover Pack Series completes 4 playlist packs.

== History ==
DropMix was announced by Harmonix and Hasbro in March 2017, and was released in September 2017.

The game was nominated for "Best Family/Social Game" at the 2017 Game Critics Awards, and for "Best Mobile Game" in Destructoid's Game of the Year Awards 2017. It was also nominated for the Tin Pan Alley Award for Best Music in a Game at the New York Game Awards 2018, and for "Family Game of the Year" at the 21st Annual D.I.C.E. Awards, and won the award for "Game, Music or Performance Based" at the 17th Annual National Academy of Video Game Trade Reviewers Awards; in addition, it was nominated for "Excellence in Convergence" at the 2018 SXSW Gaming Awards, and for "Best Music/Sound Design" and "Technical Achievement" at the 2018 Webby Awards.

The product packaging said that the Android and iOS apps were only promised to be available until December 31, 2019. Harmonix released another DJ game in 2020, Fuser. Fuser is a fully digital game that incorporates some of the same gameplay mechanics as DropMix.

== See also ==
- Fortnite Festival
