= Fuser (video game) =

FUSER
- Developer: Harmonix
- Publisher: NCSoft
- Engine: Unreal Engine 4
- Platforms: Microsoft Windows, Nintendo Switch, PlayStation 4, Xbox One
- Release: November 10, 2020
- Genres: Rhythm, party, multiplayer
- Modes: Single-player, multiplayer

Fuser is a rhythm game developed by Harmonix and published by NCSoft. It was released on November 10, 2020, for Microsoft Windows, Nintendo Switch, PlayStation 4, and Xbox One. Fuser allows players to create DJ mixes from a number of licensed musical tracks, scoring the player based on their remix. The game features both single-player and multiplayer modes as well as the ability to share remixes with other users. Following the acquisition of Harmonix by Epic Games in 2021, Harmonix shuttered the multiplayer servers in December 2022 and removed the game and additional content from sale, while leaving the single player components playable.

== Gameplay ==
In Fuser, the player takes the role of a DJ at a large concert, creating mashups of various songs. Gameplay consists of controlling a virtual DJ table with four record players, custom instruments, sound filters, and up to 24 pre-selected songs called a "crate" available to remix. Each song is separated into four stems, which are keyed by color and related to a type of musical instrument such as drums, guitar or vocals. At any time, the player can pick a song, select a stem from that song, and place it on any of the record players to add the selected stem the current mix. The game automatically adjusts the mix's tempo and musical key. Additionally, players can cue a second instrument track, which can be then switched back and forth individually with a single drop or using a "riser" that transitions them over a short period. Audio filters can be used on each instrument, and the user has the ability to create various instrument loops via a synthesizer which then can be added as another instrument. This concept is comparable to Harmonix's prior game DropMix, which was a physical card game incorporating NFC technology with an electronic game board and mobile app that was published through Hasbro.

The game has a single-player campaign featuring multiple sets across various venues. At each set, the player's mixes are scored, with more points given by adding new tracks either on the downbeat or at specific beats by each instrument where the track drops. Additionally, the virtual audience will give requests, such as for specific songs, songs from a specific genre, or a certain type of instrument. Completing these requests in a short amount of time scores additional points. The player is ranked on a five-star scale based on their total score during the set. To achieve a high score, the player has the opportunity to customize the contents of the crate to be as efficient as possible in switching between tracks.

Before their discontinuation, Fuser also included both cooperative and competitive multiplayer modes in which players collaborated on creating a mix or battled against each other. Players could also participate in weekly mix events that tasked players with creating a mix based around a particular musical genre or instrument that was then voted on by other players. The game also features a freestyle mode that allows players to create their own mixes and share them with others over social media.

Harmonix introduced the Headliner Spotlight feature in May 2021, which presented a few "Diamond Stage" dedicated Twitch channels where players could perform Fuser mixes in front of viewers. Players could earn in-game diamonds from other game activities to reserve spots on the Diamond Stage as well as to unlock additional cosmetics, songs, and other features. While a player was performing on the stage, viewers could submit requests, in similar fashion to those in the game's campaign mode, to challenge the current player.

== Development ==
Harmonix had announced a publishing deal through NCSoft in August 2018 for a rhythm game for personal computers and consoles. Harmonix's Dan Sussman said that NCSoft had seen the game in an early state and quickly became their publishing partner for it, including support for showcasing the game at industry events. Fuser was announced at the 2020 PAX East event in February 2020, with plans for release on November 10, 2020.

Sussman said that Fuser was a continued evolution of their music games in how they have looked at player agency. With Fuser, Sussman believed that many players of their games have a wide range of musical tastes and wished to have more control of how they interacted with the game's music, thus enabling them to be creative with their tastes. Additionally, Harmonix found that with games like Rock Band, which offered a large number of songs, the songs essentially became disposable as players didn't have much incentive to learn the songs in details; players wanted a game that gave them an opportunity to get more familiar with the structure of a song. Compared to many of Harmonix's past games, Fuser does not require any special peripherals; Harmonix's Dan Walsh said the main driver behind this decision was accessibility and ease of bringing the game to market, both as retail and digital products. Sussman also found that because Fuser featured gameplay distinct from their previous games, it was able to draw both experienced rhythm game players and new players.

Sussman said that as with past Harmonix games, songs from bands closely associated with Harmonix employees will likely also appear on the full setlist. Sussman also said that for music licensing purposes, they assured that the rights for these songs allowed for the ability to mix with other songs and for the sharing of game mixes to social media.

Harmonix announced that the game's online features will shut down on December 19, 2022. The game and all DLC would be removed from sale, though players would still be able to use all content they own in the game's offline modes following this date. However, it was announced on December 16, 2022, that the servers would stay up until early 2023, due to an unspecified issue.

== Soundtrack ==
The following songs are included with the base Fuser game:

Artist	Song	Genre	Year
50 Cent	"In da Club"	Rap/Hip-Hop	2003
a-ha	"Take On Me"	Pop	1984
Ace of Base	"The Sign"	Pop	1994
Agent 001	"Daniel Wiggy"	Dance	2003
Amy Winehouse	"Rehab"	R&B	2006
Armin van Buuren	"Blah Blah Blah"	Dance	2018
Austin Seltzer	"Shanghai Slugfest"	Dance	2020
Ava Max	"Sweet but Psycho"	Pop	2018
Bad Bunny	"Yo Perreo Sola"	Latin/Caribbean	2020
Basement Jaxx	"Where's Your Head At"	Dance	2001
Basra Khan	"Black Phosphorous"	Dance	2020
Becky G & Natti Natasha	"Sin Pijama"	Latin/Caribbean	2018
Benny Benassi presents The Biz	"Satisfaction"	Dance	2002
Bignums	"High Fructose"	Dance	2020
Billie Eilish	"Bad Guy"	Pop	2019
Black Light Odyssey	"Sequence Her"	Dance	2019
Blue Öyster Cult	"(Don't Fear) The Reaper"	Rock	1976
Bobby Brown	"My Prerogative"	R&B	1988
Brad Paisley	"Mud on the Tires"	Country	2003
Brown	"Reminds Me"	Dance	2020
Cade7	"Dot Calm"	Dance	2020
Cardi B	"Bodak Yellow"	Rap/Hip-Hop	2017
Carly Rae Jepsen	"Call Me Maybe"	Pop	2011
The Chainsmokers ft. Daya	"Don't Let Me Down"	Dance	2015
Charm Syndicate	"Bloom"	Dance	2020
Childish Gambino	"Summertime Magic"	R&B	2018
The Clash	"Rock the Casbah"	Rock	1982
Coldplay	"Clocks"	Rock	2002
Colette	"Physically (Pete Moss Remix)"	Dance	2020
CrackCase	"Rupture Academy"	Dance	2020
Da Sunlounge ft. Sara Z	"Been Here From the Start"	Dance	2013
Danny Humbles	"Streetfire Tango"	Dance	2020
David Youu	"Get Back To Me"	Dance	2020
Deadmau5 ft. Rob Swire	"Ghosts 'n' Stuff"	Dance	2008
Dissentor	"Rotten Colossus"	Dance	2020
DMX	"X Gon' Give It to Ya"	Rap/Hip-Hop	2003
Dolly Parton	"Jolene"	Country	1973
Donna Summer	"Hot Stuff"	Dance	1979
Doscomp	"Lonely Mornings"	Dance	2020
Dua Lipa	"Don't Start Now"	Pop	2019
DYH	"Let's Go Home"	Dance	2020
Eddie Japan	"Summer Hair"	Rock	2019
Eric B. & Rakim	"Don't Sweat the Technique"	Rap/Hip-Hop	1992
Faint Shadow	"Feeling Never Lasts"	Dance	2019
Fatboy Slim	"The Rockafeller Skank"	Dance	1998
Flo Rida feat. Sage the Gemini & Lookas	"G.D.F.R."	Rap/Hip-Hop	2014
Grandmaster Melle Mel	"The Message (2012)"	Rap/Hip-Hop	1982
Greg LeBeau	"This Isn’t Enough"	Dance	2020
Grouplove	"Tongue Tied"	Pop	2011
Hashtyani	"Mantra"	Dance	2020
Hollow	"Rip The Floor Open"	Dance	2020
Imagine Dragons	"Thunder"	Rock	2017
J Balvin & Willy William	"Mi Gente"	Latin/Caribbean	2017
Joliet	"Groove on Lockdown"	Dance	2020
Jonas Brothers	"Sucker"	Pop	2019
Justin Timberlake	"Can't Stop the Feeling!"	Pop	2016
Karol G & Nicki Minaj	"Tusa"	Latin/Caribbean	2019
Kendrick Lamar & SZA	"All the Stars"	Rap/Hip-Hop	2018
The Killers	"The Man"	Rock	2017
LaBelle	"Lady Marmalade"	R&B	1974
Lady Gaga	"Born This Way"	Pop	2011
Life On Planets	"Raise it Up"	Dance	2018
Lil Nas X ft. Billy Ray Cyrus	"Old Town Road (Remix)"	Pop	2019
Lizzo	"Good as Hell"	Rap/Hip-Hop	2016
LMFAO ft. Lauren Bennett & GoonRock	"Party Rock Anthem"	Dance	2011
Lonely C ft Kendra Foster	"Hold Up (Radio Edit)"	Dance	2018
Lord Felix	"Studio 54"	Rap/Hip-Hop	2019
Macklemore & Ryan Lewis ft. Wanz	"Thrift Shop"	Rap/Hip-Hop	2012
Maroon 5 ft. Christina Aguilera	"Moves like Jagger"	Pop	2011
Megadeth	"Symphony of Destruction"	Rock	1992
Meghan Trainor	"Me Too"	Pop	2016
Midnight Magic	"I Gotta Feeling"	Dance	2016
Migos	"Stir Fry"	Rap/Hip-Hop	2017
Naughty by Nature	"O.P.P."	Rap/Hip-Hop	1991
Nelly	"Hot in Herre"	Rap/Hip-Hop	2002
O-Zone	"Dragostea Din Tei"	Dance	2003
ORION	"Time For Crime"	Dance	2019
Otis Redding	"(Sittin' On) The Dock of the Bay"	R&B	1968
Panic! at the Disco	"High Hopes"	Pop	2018
Pattern Drama ft. Aquarius Heaven & Hezza Fezza	"Wait For Me"	Dance	2017
Paul van Dyk	"For an Angel (PvD Remix '09)"	Dance	1994
Pharrell Williams	"Happy"	Pop	2013
Pitbull ft. Ne-Yo, Afrojack & Nayer	"Give Me Everything"	Pop	2011
Pixies	"Here Comes Your Man"	Rock	1989
Post Malone	"Better Now"	Rap/Hip-Hop	2018
Rage Against the Machine	"Killing in the Name"	Rock	1992
Rick Astley	"Never Gonna Give You Up"	Pop	1987
Rüfüs Du Sol	"Eyes"	Dance	2018
Salt-N-Pepa	"Push It"	Rap/Hip-Hop	1987
Sam Hunt	"Body Like a Back Road"	Country	2017
Sean Paul	"Temperature"	Latin/Caribbean	2006
Shania Twain	"Any Man of Mine"	Country	1995
Sia ft. Sean Paul	"Cheap Thrills"	Pop	2016
Smash Mouth	"All Star"	Rock	1999
Soul Clap ft. Nick Monaco & Bill "Bass" Nelson	"Future 4 Love"	Rock	2016
Steve Porter	"Espresso"	Dance	2017
STL GLD ft. Latrell James	"Chaka Zulu"	Rap/Hip-Hop	2012
T.I. ft. Jay-Z	"Bring Em Out"	Rap/Hip-Hop	2004
TK Sun	"Hold On Infinite"	Dance	2020
Tones and I	"Dance Monkey"	Pop	2019
A Tribe Called Quest	"Can I Kick It?"	Rap/Hip-Hop	1990
Twenty One Pilots	"Stressed Out"	Rock	2015
The Unicorn Princess	"Back To Boston"	Dance	2020
Warren G & Nate Dogg	"Regulate"	Rap/Hip-Hop	1994
The Weeknd	"Blinding Lights"	Pop	2019
Whitney Houston	"I Wanna Dance with Somebody (Who Loves Me)"	Pop	1987
Young MC	"Bust a Move"	Rap/Hip-Hop	1989
Zedd, Maren Morris & Grey	"The Middle"	Dance	2018

Three songs were also available as pre-order bonuses. The pre-order bonuses were later released as normal DLC on January 21, 2021.

Artist	Song	Genre	Year
Dua Lipa	"New Rules"	Pop	2017
Khalid	"Young Dumb & Broke"	R&B	2017
The Killers	"Mr. Brightside"	Rock	2003

=== DLC ===
Upon release, 25 songs became available as the first batch of DLC.

Artist	Song	Genre	Year
21 Savage	"A Lot"	Rap/Hip-Hop	2019
Afrojack ft. Eva Simons	"Take Over Control"	Dance	2010
Alanis Morissette	"Ironic"	Pop	1996
Amerie	"1 Thing"	R&B	2005
Ava Max	"Kings & Queens"	Pop	2020
Bananarama	"Venus"	Pop	1986
The Cranberries	"Linger"	Rock	1993
DJ Snake, J Balvin & Tyga	"Loco Contigo"	Latin/Caribbean	2019
Echo & the Bunnymen	"Lips Like Sugar"	Rock	1987
Erasure	"A Little Respect"	Pop	1988
Evanescence	"Bring Me to Life"	Rock	2003
Fetty Wap	"Trap Queen"	Rap/Hip-Hop	2014
French Montana ft. Swae Lee	"Unforgettable"	Rap/Hip-Hop	2017
Glen Campbell	"Gentle on My Mind"	Country	1967
Ini Kamoze	"Here Comes the Hotstepper (Heartical Mix)"	Latin/Caribbean	1994
Justin Timberlake	"Rock Your Body"	Pop	2003
Kane Brown ft. Lauren Alaina	"What Ifs"	Country	2017
Kelly Clarkson	"Stronger (What Doesn't Kill You)"	Pop	2012
Mark Ronson ft. Miley Cyrus	"Nothing Breaks Like a Heart"	Pop	2018
Nicki Minaj	"Starships"	Pop	2012
Sean Paul	"Get Busy"	Latin/Caribbean	2003
Soulja Boy Tell 'Em	"Crank That (Soulja Boy)"	Rap/Hip-Hop	2007
Tone Loc	"Funky Cold Medina"	Rap/Hip-Hop	1989
Topic with A7S	"Breaking Me"	Dance	2019
Usher ft. Pitbull	"DJ Got Us Fallin' in Love"	Pop	2010

On November 18, 2020, Harmonix announced the first batch of post-release DLC songs, along with the 2020 Backstage Pass which includes all songs and cosmetic packs released until the end of 2020.

Artist	Song	Genre	Year	Release date
Deee-Lite	"Groove Is in the Heart"	Pop	1990	November 19, 2020
Harry Styles	"Adore You"	Pop	2019	November 19, 2020
Zedd & Griff	"Inside Out"	Dance	2020	November 19, 2020
Maroon 5	"Maps"	Pop	2014	November 24, 2020
Schoolboy Q	"Man of the Year"	Rap/Hip-Hop	2013	November 24, 2020
Tag Team	"Whoomp! (There It Is)"	Rap/Hip-Hop	1993	November 24, 2020
Future	"Mask Off"	Rap/Hip-Hop	2017	December 3, 2020
Sub Urban	"Cradles"	Dance	2019	December 3, 2020
OneRepublic	"Counting Stars"	Pop	2013	December 3, 2020
Lizzo	"Juice"	Rap/Hip-Hop	2019	December 10, 2020
Rascal Flatts	"Life Is a Highway"	Country	2006	December 10, 2020
Weezer	"Buddy Holly"	Rock	1994	December 10, 2020
Mase	"Feel So Good"	Rap/Hip-Hop	1997	December 17, 2020
The Sugarhill Gang	"Apache (2012)"	Rap/Hip-Hop	1981	December 17, 2020
Wu-Tang Clan	"Gravel Pit"	Rap/Hip-Hop	2000	December 17, 2020
Icona Pop ft. Charli XCX	"I Love It"	Pop	2012	December 22, 2020
Flo Rida ft. T-Pain	"Low"	Rap/Hip-Hop	2007	December 22, 2020
EMF	"Unbelievable"	Pop	1990	December 22, 2020
Lil Uzi Vert	"XO Tour Llif3"	Rap/Hip-Hop	2017	December 29, 2020
Jack Harlow	"Whats Poppin"	Rap/Hip-Hop	2020	December 29, 2020
SAINt JHN	"Roses (Imanbek Remix)"	Dance	2019	December 29, 2020
Chumbawamba	"Tubthumping"	Rock	1997	January 7, 2021
The Clash	"Should I Stay or Should I Go"	Rock	1982	January 7, 2021
Post Malone	"Circles"	Pop	2019	January 7, 2021
Chaka Demus & Pliers	"Murder She Wrote"	Latin/Caribbean	1992	January 14, 2021
Kat DeLuna ft. Elephant Man	"Whine Up"	Latin/Caribbean	2007	January 14, 2021
Ricky Martin	"Livin' la Vida Loca"	Latin/Caribbean	1999	January 14, 2021
Jason Derulo	"Take You Dancing"	Pop	2020	January 28, 2021
Marshmello ft. Bastille	"Happier"	Dance	2018	January 28, 2021
Shaggy	"Boombastic (Hot Shot 2020)"	Latin/Caribbean	1995	January 28, 2021
24kGoldn ft. Iann Dior	"Mood"	Rap/Hip-Hop	2020	February 4, 2021
Bebe Rexha ft. Doja Cat	"Baby, I'm Jealous"	Pop	2020	February 4, 2021
Shawn Mendes	"Higher"	Pop	2020	February 4, 2021
David Guetta & Sia	"Let's Love"	Dance	2020	February 11, 2021
Dua Lipa & Blackpink	"Kiss and Make Up"	Pop	2017	February 11, 2021
Surf Mesa ft. Emilee	"ILY (I Love You Baby)"	Dance	2019	February 11, 2021
Anitta ft. Cardi B and Myke Towers	"Me Gusta"	Latin/Caribbean	2020	February 18, 2021
Harry Styles	"Golden"	Pop	2020	February 18, 2021
Marshmello, Imanbek ft. Usher	"Too Much"	Dance	2020	February 18, 2021
Bell Biv DeVoe	"Poison"	R&B	1990	February 25, 2021
DaBaby	"Bop"	Rap/Hip-Hop	2019	February 25, 2021
Daddy Yankee ft. Snow	"Con Calma"	Latin/Caribbean	2019	February 25, 2021
Ava Max	"My Head & My Heart"	Pop	2020	March 4, 2021
Bonnie Tyler	"Holding Out for a Hero"	Rock	1984	March 4, 2021
David Guetta ft. Nicki Minaj & Flo Rida	"Where Them Girls At"	Dance	2011	March 11, 2021
Vengaboys	"We Like to Party! (The Vengabus)"	Dance	1998	March 11, 2021
The White Stripes	"Seven Nation Army"	Rock	2003	March 11, 2021
Sean Kingston	"Fire Burning"	Latin/Caribbean	2009	March 18, 2021
Tiësto	"Red Lights"	Dance	2013	March 18, 2021
Linkin Park	"Numb"	Rock	2003	March 25, 2021
Martin Garrix	"Animals"	Dance	2013	March 25, 2021
Modern English	"I Melt with You"	Pop	1982	March 25, 2021
Darude	"Sandstorm"	Dance	2000	April 1, 2021
Panic! at the Disco	"Dancing's Not a Crime"	Pop	2018	April 1, 2021
La Guerra Naranja	"Una Noche Más"	Latin/Caribbean	2021	April 8, 2021
Winnage	"The Night Porter"	Dance	2021	April 8, 2021
Ja Rule ft. Ashanti	"Always on Time"	R&B	2001	April 15, 2021
Lady Gaga & Blackpink	"Sour Candy"	Pop	2020	April 15, 2021
Free Sheets	"Don't You Dare"	Rap/Hip-Hop	2001	April 22, 2021
ximena	"pi de limón"	Dance	2021	April 22, 2021
Anthrax	"Among the Living"	Rock	1987	April 29, 2021
The Offspring	"Self Esteem"	Rock	1994	April 29, 2021
J. Cole	"No Role Modelz"	Rap/Hip-Hop	2015	May 6, 2021
Some Lover	"Days Ahead, Days Behind"	Country	1995	May 6, 2021
Billie Eilish	"Therefore I Am"	Pop	2020	May 13, 2021
Disclosure ft. Sam Smith	"Latch"	Dance	2012	May 13, 2021
The Cure	"Friday I'm in Love"	Rock	1992	May 20, 2021
Soft Cell	"Tainted Love"	Pop	1981	May 20, 2021
Connecticut River Boys	"Must Be Nice"	Country	1970	May 25, 2021
Dirty Vegas	"Days Go By"	Dance	2001	May 27, 2021
Haddaway	"What Is Love"	Dance	1993	May 27, 2021
Faint Shadow	"Loop Pack 01"	Dance	2021	May 27, 2021
Danny Humbles	"Loop Pack 02"	Dance	2021	May 28, 2021
The Last Cavallard	"Abilene and Down"	Country	1985	May 28, 2021
Fleetwood Mac	"Dreams"	Rock	1977	June 3, 2021
Hall & Oates	"Maneater"	Rock	1982	June 3, 2021
Cap'n Spicy Dill	"Soon May the Wellerman Come"	Pop	1860	June 3, 2021
TK Sun	"Loop Pack 03"	Dance	2021	June 4, 2021
Zara Larsson	"Look What You've Done"	Pop	2021	June 10, 2021
Alesso & Armin van Buuren	"Leave a Little Love"	Dance	2021	June 10, 2021
Imagine Dragons	"Follow You"	Rock	2021	June 17, 2021
Machine Gun Kelly & Blackbear	"My Ex's Best Friend"	Rock	2020	June 17, 2021
Dissentor	"Loop Pack 12"	Dance	2021	June 17, 2021
Dissentor	"Loop Pack 04"	Dance	2021	June 18, 2021
Joel Corry ft. MNEK	"Head & Heart"	Pop	2020	June 24, 2021
Masked Wolf	"Astronaut in the Ocean"	Rap/Hip-Hop	2019	June 24, 2021
Blanks	"Hart and 12th"	Dance	2013	June 25, 2021
Lil Nas X	"Montero (Call Me by Your Name)"	Pop	2021	July 1, 2021
Tiësto	"The Business"	Dance	2020	July 1, 2021
ATB, Topic, A7S	"Your Love (9PM)"	Dance	2021	July 8, 2021
Skrewbert	"The Game Got You"	Dance	2016	July 8, 2021
Warlords of the Old West	"Strychnine Baby"	Rock	2003	July 9, 2021
Beast Business	"Royce Please"	Rap/Hip-Hop	2016	July 15, 2021
Marlon Kane	"This is How You Left Me"	R&B	1969	July 15, 2021
Black Astrolabe	"Parabola"	Rock	1973	July 15, 2021
Katrina and the Waves	"Walking on Sunshine"	Pop	1983	July 22, 2021
Faint Shadow	"Loop Pack 07"	Dance	2021	July 22, 2021
The Lingala Sound	"Crystal Beach"	Dance	2016	July 29, 2021
TK Sun	"Loop Pack 11"	Dance	2021	July 29, 2021
Jace The Revelator ft. Info$ec	"Silly Bros"	Rap/Hip-Hop	2005	July 30, 2021
Righteous Palms Crew	"Take U 4 A Ride"	Dance	1993	August 5, 2021
Bignums	"Loop Pack 05"	Rap/Hip-Hop	2021	August 12, 2021
The Venona Project	"Fermionic"	Dance	2006	August 19, 2021
Pinhole Cage	"Just About to Snap"	Rock	1997	August 19, 2021
Basra Khan	"Loop Pack 06"	Dance	2021	August 26, 2021
Victoria Chance	"Love Theme from The Invisible Jury"	Pop	2014	September 2, 2021
Spectral Interference	"Slackjaw"	Dance	1986	September 9, 2021
The Proclaimers	"I'm Gonna Be (500 Miles)"	Rock	1988	September 23, 2021
Fine Young Cannibals	"She Drives Me Crazy"	Rock	1988	September 23, 2021
Freda Turner	"Hard Light"	Dance	1978	September 30, 2021
Ellie Goulding	"Lights"	Pop	2010	October 7, 2021
X Ambassadors	"Renegades"	Rock	2015	October 7, 2021
Deep Purple	"Smoke on the Water"	Rock	1972	October 7, 2021
Talking Heads	"Burning Down the House"	Rock	1983	October 7, 2021
Lossage	"Moon Lab"	Dance	2013	October 14, 2021
Pseudoprime	"Laser Dome"	Dance	2014	October 21, 2021
Bignums	"Larry's Place (Part II)"	Rap/Hip-Hop	2019	October 28, 2021
Naughty by Nature	"Hip Hop Hooray"	Rap/Hip-Hop	1993	November 4, 2021
Mobb Deep	"Shook Ones (Part II)"	Rap/Hip-Hop	1995	November 4, 2021
Rick James	"Super Freak"	R&B	1981	November 4, 2021
War	"Low Rider"	Rock	1975	November 4, 2021
Jackson Oak	"Submerged"	Rock	1995	November 4, 2021
Macrotape	"Barcoded"	Dance	1990	November 18, 2021
Tiny Taps	"Dead Metrocard"	Dance	2006	November 25, 2021
Megan Thee Stallion	"Savage"	Rap/Hip-Hop	2020	December 9, 2021
Dua Lipa	"Levitating"	Pop	2020	December 9, 2021
Lizzo ft. Cardi B	"Rumors"	Pop	2021	December 9, 2021
The Kid LAROI	"Stay"	Pop	2021	December 9, 2021
CrackCase	"Somatic"	Dance	2015	December 9, 2021
The Flashpaper Kingdom	"Watch Your Step"	Dance	2012	December 16, 2021
Marlon Kane	"Parlayed"	R&B	1969	January 6, 2022
Candy Kettles	"Dexting"	Dance	2015	January 20, 2022
Nightfeels	"Find You"	Rock	2005	February 10, 2022
5 Bladed	"GrimeTime"	Dance	2015	February 17, 2022
Son Horizon	"That Unbearable Lightness"	Dance	2010	April 14, 2022

On February 10, 2022, it was announced that after the release of individual singles from the 2021 Mixtape pack in March, paid DLC releases for the game would cease, while music inside of the Diamond Shop will continue to be released.

== Reception ==
Reception

Aggregate scores
Aggregator	Score
Metacritic	NS: 80/100; PC: 74/100; PS4: 82/100; XONE: 81/100
OpenCritic	78% recommend

Review scores
Publication	Score
Destructoid	6.5/10
GameSpot	8/10
Hardcore Gamer	4/5
IGN	7/10
Nintendo Life	7/10
Nintendo World Report	8/10
PCMag	4.5/5
Shacknews	8/10
The Guardian	5/5

Fuser received a generally positive reception from critics. The PC release received "mixed or average reviews". Fellow review aggregator OpenCritic assessed that the game received strong approval, being recommended by 78% of critics.
