= 2021 OpTic Chicago season =

American esports team season

- Head coach: Troy "Sender" Michaels
- General manager: Hector "HECZ" Rodriguez
- Owner: Andy Miller
- Arena(s): Wintrust Arena

Results
- Record: 26-18 (.591)
- Place: 4th
- Season Playoffs: T-5th
- Total Earnings: $295,000

The 2021 OpTic Chicago season is the second season for NRG Esports in the Call of Duty League. It was announced on November 11, 2020 that this would be the first season under the brand of OpTic Chicago after the Chicago Huntsmen re-branded when CEO Hector "HECZ" Rodriguez regained the intellectual property of OpTic Gaming.

The league season was re-structured moving into the 2021 season with the regular season now consisting of five stages which all would culminate with a major tournament. Each major would include all 12 teams with teams split into 2 groups of six. Teams would then compete against the five teams in their group to determine seeding for the stage ending major tournament.

== Preceding offseason ==
The team announced on September 7 and 8, 2020 that Pierce "Gunless" Hillman, Alec "Arcitys" Sanderson, and Preston "Prestinni" Sanderson left the team. Gunless and Prestinni later joined the Seattle Surge while Arcitys joined the Atlanta FaZe.

On September 14, 2020 it was announced that OpTic Gaming Los Angeles player Brandon "Dashy" Otell joined Seth "Scump" Abner", Matthew "FormaL" Piper, and Dylan "Envoy" Hannon to make up the starting roster as the CDL announced the league returned to 4v4.

== Overview ==
=== Kickoff Classic ===
On January 24, the CDL opened the season with the Kickoff Classic that had 6 matches that were all voted on by the fans. With 89.7% of the vote, the fans voted for OpTic to face former player Matthew "Nadeshot" Haag's franchise the LA Thieves. OpTic won that match 3–0.

=== Stage 1 ===
Prior to their match in the Kickoff Classic it was revealed that the Dallas Empire sent OpTic to Group B for Stage 1. Group B included the Atlanta FaZe, Florida Mutineers, Los Angeles Guerrillas, Paris Legion, and Toronto Ultra. Stage 1 was initially planned to consist of 3 home series on February 11–14, 18–21, and 25–28, however as a result of the Texas power crisis the final two weeks were condensed into a super week. It concluded with the Stage 1 Major happening on March 1–7.

As a result of their 4–1 record in Stage 1, OpTic Chicago finished second in the Group B standings and qualified for the Winner's Bracket at the Major. At the major the team finished with a 2–2 record ultimately placing 4th overall.

=== Stage 2 ===
The Stage 2 groups were announced via the Call of Duty League's YouTube on 12 March. Atlanta FaZe sent OpTic to Group B for Stage 2. Group B also included the Dallas Empire, Florida Mutineers, Paris Legion, Minnesota Rokkr and Seattle Surge. Stage 2 consisted of the Toronto Ultra home series on March 18–21, Week 2 on March 25–28 and the Los Angeles Guerillas home series on April 1–4. It concluded with the Stage 2 Major on April 5–11.

After finishing Stage 2 with a 3–2 record, the same record as Minnesota ROKKR and Dallas Empire, OpTic Chicago were subsequently seeded 2nd from Group B as a result of tiebreakers qualifying for the Winner's Bracket at the Major. At the major the team finished with a 1–2 record, placing them tied for 5th with Los Angeles Thieves.

=== Stage 3 ===
The Stage 3 groups were announced via the Call of Duty League's YouTube on 16 April. Toronto Ultra sent OpTic to Group B for Stage 3. Group B also included the Atlanta FaZe, Los Angeles Thieves, New York Subliners, Seattle Surge and London Royal Ravens. Stage 3 consisted of the London Royal Ravens home series on April 22–25, Paris Legion home series April 29- May 2 and the Dallas Empire home series May 6–9. It concluded with the Stage 3 Major in the week of May 10.

After finishing Stage 3 with a 2–3 record, OpTic Chicago were seeded 4th from Group B and were placed in the Loser's Bracket at the Major. At the major the team finished with a 3–1 record, placing them 4th overall.

=== Stage 4 ===
The Stage 4 groups were announced via the Call of Duty League's YouTube on 22 May. New York Subliners sent OpTic to Group A for Stage 4. Group A also included the Atlanta FaZe, Los Angeles Thieves, Minnesota ROKKR, Seattle Surge and Paris Legion. Stage 4 consisted of the OpTic Chicago home series on May 27–30, Florida Mutineers home series June 3–6 and the Los Angeles Thieves home series June 10–13. It concluded with the Stage 4 Major on June 17–20.

After finishing Stage 4 with a 3–2 record, OpTic Chicago were seeded 2nd from Group A and were placed in the Winners's Bracket at the Major. At the major the team finished with a 2–2 record, placing them 4th overall.

=== Stage 5 ===
The Stage 5 groups were announced via the Call of Duty League's YouTube on 25 June. Dallas Empire sent OpTic to Group A for Stage 5. Group A also included the Atlanta FaZe, Los Angeles Thieves, New York Subliners, London Royal Ravens and Paris Legion. Stage 4 consisted of the New York Subliners home series on July 8–11, Minnesota ROKKR home series July 15–18 and the Seattle Surge home series July 22–25. It will conclude with the Stage 5 Major on July 29–1 August, which will see the return of fans in attendance for the first time since February 2020 as a result of the COVID-19 pandemic.

After finishing Stage 5 with a 4–1 record, OpTic Chicago were seeded 1st from Group A and were placed in the Winners's Bracket at the Major with a first round bye.

== Roster ==
2021 OpTic Chicago roster
Players
Coaches

Handle	Name	Nationality
Dashy	Otell, Brandon	Canada
Envoy	Hannon, Dylan	United States
FormaL	Piper, Matthew	United States
Scump	Abner, Seth	United States
General	General, Jordon	United States

Head coach

- Troy "Sender" Michaels

Assistant coach(es)

- Damon "Karma" Barlow

Legend:
- (I) Inactive
- (S) Suspended
- Substitute
- (injured) Injury / Illness

Latest roster transaction: February 11, 2021.

== Standings ==
2021 Call of Duty League standings
#	Team	Pts	EP	MW	ML	M%	GW	GL	G%
1	Atlanta FaZe	525	5	34	7	.829	122	53	.697
2	Toronto Ultra	415	5	29	17	.630	113	79	.589
3	Dallas Empire	400	5	26	18	.591	99	84	.541
4	OpTic Chicago	360	5	26	18	.591	97	74	.567
5	New York Subliners	340	5	24	17	.585	85	81	.512
6	Minnesota ROKKR	305	5	20	17	.541	75	73	.507
7	Los Angeles Thieves	240	5	18	21	.462	74	83	.471
8	Florida Mutineers	210	5	17	19	.472	69	70	.496
9	Seattle Surge	120	5	11	25	.306	56	85	.397
10	London Royal Ravens	110	5	9	23	.281	45	79	.363
11	Los Angeles Guerrillas	100	5	8	26	.235	44	87	.336
12	Paris Legion	100	5	8	22	.267	42	73	.365

== Game log ==
=== Preseason ===
2021 preseason game log
Kickoff Classic

1	January 24	OpTic Chicago	3	–	0	LA Thieves	Online
	5:00 pm CST						Online
		250	HP- Garrison			136	
		6	S&D- Checkmate			4	
		3	CTRL- Raid			0	

=== Regular season ===
2021 regular season game log
Stage 1

Qualifier match 1	February 12	OpTic Chicago	3	–	0	Paris Legion	Online
	3:00 pm EST						Online
		250	HP - Raid			102	
		6	S&D - Checkmate			4	
		3	CTRL - Raid			2	

Qualifier match 2	February 14	OpTic Chicago	2	–	3	Atlanta FaZe	Online
	6:00 pm EST						Online
		250	HP - Garrison			225	
		0	S&D - Miami			6	
		3	CTRL - Checkmate			2	
		245	HP - Moscow			250	
		1	S&D - Moscow			6	

Qualifier match 3	February 24	OpTic Chicago	3	–	1	Toronto Ultra	Online
	5:00 pm CST						Online
		250	HP - Checkmate			68	
		4	S&D - Raid			6	
		3	CTRL - Raid			1	
		250	HP - Raid			218	

Qualifier match 4	February 25	OpTic Chicago	3	–	1	Los Angeles Guerrillas	Online
	3:30 pm CST						Online
		234	HP - Garrison			250	
		6	S&D - Moscow			3	
		3	CTRL - Raid			1	
		250	HP - Moscow			191	

Qualifier match 5	February 28	OpTic Chicago	3	–	1	Florida Mutineers	Online
	3:30 pm CST						Online
		229	HP - Garrison			250	
		6	S&D - Checkmate			5	
		3	CTRL - Checkmate			2	
		250	HP - Checkmate			178	

Winners' round 1	March 4	OpTic Chicago	3	–	0	New York Subliners	Online
	3:30 pm CST						Online
		250	HP - Checkmate			180	
		6	S&D - Moscow			1	
		3	CTRL - Raid			1	

Winners' round 2	March 5	OpTic Chicago	2	–	3	Dallas Empire	Online
	3:30 pm CST						Online
		149	HP - Garrison			250	
		6	S&D - Moscow			2	
		3	CTRL - Raid			2	
		157	HP - Moscow			250	
		5	S&D - Checkmate			6	

Losers' round 4	March 6	OpTic Chicago	3	–	1	Los Angeles Thieves	Online
	3:30 pm CST						Online
		250	HP - Crossroads			190	
		5	S&D - Raid			6	
		3	CTRL - Checkmate			1	
		250	HP - Raid			166	

Losers' round 5	March 6	OpTic Chicago	0	–	3	New York Subliners	Online
	5:00 pm CST						Online
		155	HP - Crossroads			250	
		1	S&D - Garrison			6	
		1	CTRL - Checkmate			3	

Stage 2

Qualifier match 1	March 21	OpTic Chicago	3	–	1	Paris Legion	Online
	1:00 pm CST						Online
		250	HP - Checkmate			184	
		4	S&D - Express			6	
		3	CTRL - Raid			0	
		250	HP - Apocalypse			224	

Qualifier match 2	March 25	OpTic Chicago	0	–	3	Minnesota ROKKR	Online
	2:30 pm CST						Online
		81	HP - Raid			250	
		4	S&D - Raid			6	
		1	CTRL - Raid			3	

Qualifier match 3	March 28	OpTic Chicago	0	–	3	Florida Mutineers	Online
	4:00 pm CST						Online
		221	HP - Raid			250	
		5	S&D - Checkmate			6	
		2	CTRL - Checkmate			3	

Qualifier match 4	April 1	OpTic Chicago	3	–	0	Seattle Surge	Online
	2:30 pm CST						Online
		250	HP - Raid			226	
		6	S&D - Checkmate			2	
		3	CTRL - Raid			2	

Qualifier match 5	April 4	OpTic Chicago	3	–	2	Dallas Empire	Online
	3:00 pm CST						Online
		244	HP - Moscow			250	
		6	S&D - Raid			2	
		2	CTRL - Checkmate			3	
		250	HP - Checkmate			108	
		6	S&D - Checkmate			1	

Winners' round 1	April 8	OpTic Chicago	1	–	3	Toronto Ultra	Online
	2:30 pm CST						Online
		250	HP - Checkmate			236	
		5	S&D - Moscow			6	
		1	CTRL - Raid			3	
		234	HP - Raid			250	

Losers' round 3	April 9	OpTic Chicago	3	–	1	Seattle Surge	Online
	4:00 pm CST						Online
		202	HP - Raid			250	
		6	S&D - Checkmate			2	
		3	CTRL - Raid			1	
		250	HP - Garrison			183	

Losers' round 4	April 10	OpTic Chicago	2	–	3	Minnesota ROKKR	Online
	2:30 pm CST						Online
		192	HP - Garrison			250	
		6	S&D - Express			2	
		1	CTRL - Garrison			3	
		250	HP - Moscow			138	
		5	S&D - Moscow			6	

Stage 3

Qualifier match 1	April 23	OpTic Chicago	3	–	1	London Royal Ravens	Online
	3:30 pm CST						Online
		250	HP - Garrison			207	
		6	S&D - Moscow			4	
		2	CTRL - Checkmate			3	
		250	HP - Moscow			152	

Qualifier match 2	April 24	OpTic Chicago	3	–	0	Seattle Surge	Online
	5:00 pm CST						Online
		250	HP - Moscow			240	
		6	S&D - Moscow			4	
		3	CTRL - Checkmate			1	

Qualifier match 3	May 2	OpTic Chicago	1	–	3	Los Angeles Thieves	Online
	5:00 pm CST						Online
		205	HP - Checkmate			250	
		6	S&D - Express			3	
		2	CTRL - Raid			3	
		117	HP - Apocalypse			250	

Qualifier match 4	May 6	OpTic Chicago	1	–	3	New York Subliners	Online
	3:30 pm CST						Online
		92	HP - Apocalypse			250	
		2	S&D - Express			6	
		3	CTRL - Checkmate			1	
		230	HP - Moscow			250	

Qualifier match 5	May 9	OpTic Chicago	0	–	3	Atlanta FaZe	Online
	3:30 pm CST						Online
		88	HP - Raid			250	
		2	S&D - Moscow			6	
		0	CTRL - Raid			3	

Losers' round 2	May 14	OpTic Chicago	3	–	1	Los Angeles Guerrillas	Online
	3:30 pm CST						Online
		148	HP - Garrison			250	
		6	S&D - Moscow			5	
		3	CTRL - Raid			2	
		250	HP - Moscow			210	

Losers' round 3	May 15	OpTic Chicago	3	–	0	Dallas Empire	Online
	3:30 pm CST						Online
		250	HP - Garrison			151	
		6	S&D - Checkmate			5	
		3	CTRL - Raid			1	

Losers' round 4	May 15	OpTic Chicago	3	–	0	Florida Mutineers	Online
	5:00 pm CST						Online
		250	HP - Moscow			139	
		6	S&D - Raid			5	
		3	CTRL - Checkmate			1	

Losers' round 5	May 16	OpTic Chicago	2	–	3	Toronto Ultra	Online
	2:00 pm CST						Online
		250	HP - Garrison			180	
		3	S&D - Moscow			6	
		2	CTRL - Raid			3	
		250	HP - CHeckmate			117	
		5	S&D - Raid			6	

Stage 4

Qualifier match 1	May 28	OpTic Chicago	3	–	0	Minnesota ROKKR	Online
	3:30 pm CST						Online
		250	HP - Moscow			238	
		6	S&D - Standoff			2	
		3	CTRL - Raid			0	

Qualifier match 2	May 30	OpTic Chicago	0	–	3	Atlanta FaZe	Online
	5:00 pm CST						Online
		157	HP - Moscow			250	
		4	S&D - Express			6	
		0	CTRL - Raid			3	

Qualifier match 3	June 5	OpTic Chicago	3	–	1	Paris Legion	Online
	3:30 pm CST						Online
		250	HP - Garrison			240	
		6	S&D - Standoff			2	
		1	CTRL - Raid			3	
		250	HP - Moscow			156	

Qualifier match 4	June 10	OpTic Chicago	2	–	3	Seattle Surge	Online
	3:30 pm CST						Online
		232	HP - Raid			250	
		6	S&D - Moscow			3	
		1	CTRL - Checkmate			3	
		250	HP - Checkmate			227	
		4	S&D - Raid			6	

Qualifier match 5	June 13	OpTic Chicago	3	–	1	Los Angeles Thieves	Online
	5:00 pm CST						Online
		250	HP - Garrison			163	
		4	S&D - Standoff			6	
		3	CTRL - Checkmate			0	
		250	HP - Moscow			126	

Winner's round 1	June 17	OpTic Chicago	0	–	3	Dallas Empire	Arlington, Texas
	5:00 pm CST						Esports Stadium Arlington
		160	HP - Garrison			250	
		1	S&D - Standoff			6	
		1	CTRL - Checkmate			3	

Loser's round 3	June 19	OpTic Chicago	3	–	2	Seattle Surge	Arlington, Texas
	2:00 pm CST						Esports Stadium Arlington
		250	HP - Checkmate			175	
		6	S&D - Express			4	
		2	CTRL - Checkmate			3	
		217	HP - Apocalypse			250	
		6	S&D - Moscow			3	

Loser's round 4	June 19	OpTic Chicago	3	–	1	Minnesota ROKKR	Arlington, Texas
	6:30 pm CST						Esports Stadium Arlington
		250	HP - Checkmate			180	
		4	S&D - Raid			6	
		3	CTRL - Checkmate			2	
		250	HP - Garrison			215	

Loser's round 5	June 20	OpTic Chicago	1	–	3	Dallas Empire	Arlington, Texas
	3:00 pm CST						Esports Stadium Arlington
		244	HP - Garrison			250	
		3	S&D - Express			6	
		3	CTRL - Checkmate			2	
		176	HP - Moscow			250	

Stage 5

Qualifier match 1	July 8	OpTic Chicago	3	–	0	Paris Legion	Online
	3:30 pm EST						Online
		250	HP - Garrison			185	
		6	S&D - Standoff			5	
		3	CTRL - Raid			0	

Qualifier match 2	July 11	OpTic Chicago	3	–	0	New York Subliners	Online
	5:00 pm EST						Online
		250	HP - Moscow			200	
		6	S&D - Express			5	
		3	CTRL - Raid			1	

Qualifier match 3	July 18	OpTic Chicago	3	–	2	Atlanta FaZe	Online
	3:30 pm CST						Online
		250	HP - Moscow			177	
		4	S&D - Miami			6	
		3	CTRL - Raid			2	
		172	HP - Apocalypse			250	
		6	S&D - Standoff			5	

Qualifier match 4	July 22	OpTic Chicago	3	–	0	London Royal Ravens	Online
	3:30 pm CST						Online
		250	HP - Raid			207	
		6	S&D - Moscow			4	
		3	CTRL - Raid			2	

Qualifier match 5	July 24	OpTic Chicago	2	–	3	Los Angeles Thieves	Online
	5:00 pm CST						Online
		250	HP - Moscow			72	
		6	S&D - Express			1	
		1	CTRL - Checkmate			3	
		196	HP - Checkmate			250	
		3	S&D - Moscow			6	

Winner's round 2	July 30	OpTic Chicago	2	–	3	Toronto Ultra	Arlington, Texas
	6:30 pm CST						Esports Stadium Arlington
		250	HP - Checkmate			236	
		2	S&D - Miami			6	
		3	CTRL - Raid			2	
		134	HP - Garrison			250	
		2	S&D - Express			6	

Loser's round 4	July 31	OpTic Chicago	3	–	2	Seattle Surge	Arlington, Texas
	6:30 pm CST						Esports Stadium Arlington
		188	HP - Moscow			250	
		6	S&D - Raid			5	
		3	CTRL - Checkmate			0	
		204	HP - Raid			250	
		6	S&D - Standoff			2	

Loser's round 5	August 1	OpTic Chicago	3	–	1	Dallas Empire	Arlington, Texas
	6:30 pm CST						Esports Stadium Arlington
		250	HP - Moscow			86	
		5	S&D - Raid			6	
		3	CTRL - Checkmate			2	
		250	HP - Raid			203	

Loser's round 5	August 1	OpTic Chicago	1	–	3	Toronto Ultra	Arlington, Texas
	6:30 pm CST						Esports Stadium Arlington
		245	HP - Garrison			250	
		6	S&D - Moscow			4	
		1	CTRL - Raid			3	
		148	HP - Checkmate			250	

=== Postseason ===
2021 post season game log
Playoffs

Winner's round 1	August 19	OpTic Chicago	2	–	3	New York Subliners	Los Angeles, California
	3:00 pm CST						Galen Center
		110	HP - Checkmate			250	
		1	S&D - Express			6	
		3	CTRL - Checkmate			2	
		250	HP - Apocalypse			96	
		4	S&D - Raid			6	

Loser's round 1	August 19	OpTic Chicago	3	–	1	Florida Mutineers	Los Angeles, California
	7:00 pm CST						Galen Center
		250	HP - Moscow			102	
		2	S&D - Standoff			6	
		3	CTRL - Checkmate			1	
		250	HP - Apocalypse			159	

Loser's round 2	August 20	OpTic Chicago	1	–	3	Toronto Ultra	Los Angeles, California
	5:30 pm CST						Galen Center
		176	HP - Checkmate			250	
		3	S&D - Moscow			6	
		3	CTRL - Raid			2	
		230	HP - Raid			250	
