= Arcitys =

American professional esports player (born 1998)

Personal information
- Name: Alec Sanderson
- Nationality: American

Career information
- Game: Call of Duty
- Playing career: 2015–present

Team history
- 2015–2016: EZG eSports West
- 2016: Apotheon Esports
- 2016: FLARE eSports
- 2016: GosuCrew
- 2016–2019: eUnited
- 2020: Chicago Huntsmen
- 2021–2022: Atlanta FaZe
- 2022–2023: Los Angeles Guerrillas
- 2023–2024: Seattle Surge
- 2025: Vegas Falcons

Career highlights and awards
- 2× COD World Champion (2019, 2021); 1× COD Challengers Champion (2024)

Alec Sanderson, better known as Arcitys, is an American professional Call of Duty for the Vegas Falcons of the Call of Duty League (CDL). Beginning his career in 2015, Arcitys won 2019 Call of Duty World League Championship representing eUnited and the 2021 Call of Duty League Championship representing Atlanta FaZe.

== Career ==
=== Call of Duty: Black Ops III (2015–2016 season) ===
Arcitys started his career on the team EZG eSports West alongside Kazmo, Muniebro, and twin brother Prestinni. This team finished first in the pA League Season 1 Regular Season and won the pA League Season 1 Playoffs. After turning 18, Arcitys and Prestinni started teaming with Stumpfy and Destiny under Apotheon Esports to begin competing in CWL and MLG tournaments. The team had some good placements online and at the first LAN event, they battled through the open bracket and into pools for a top 12 placement at the MLG Orlando Open. The team then dropped Destiny for Mayhem and qualified for the Call of Duty Champs 2015 at the CWL NA Championship Qualifier. At the CWL Championship, the team failed to make it out of pools and placed top 24.

=== Call of Duty: Infinite Warfare (2016–2017 season) ===
At the start of the year, Arcitys would join GosuCrew with Gunless, DraMa, and Prestinni. The team was looking relatively strong online and qualified for pools at the Las Vegas Open where they would finish with a modest top 12 placement. Seeing the potential, veteran player Silly decided to pick up the trio of Arcitys, Prestinni, and Gunless to play under eUnited. Going into the roster's initial offline event people were unsure if eUnited can turn the online success into LAN success, and they proved they could by winning the CWL Atlanta Open beating tournament favorites OpTic Gaming in the grand final. Despite winning the last event, eUnited still was not in the top 4 of NA pro points so they had to play through the open bracket at the CWL Paris Open and after not making it into pools they finished with a disappointing top 16 placement. The team did rebound and place second at the CWL Dallas Open this time losing in another close and entertaining grand finals against OpTic Gaming. The team then placed an underwhelming top 6 in the CWL Pro League Stage 1 and after the disappointing finish, Gunless made the decision to bench himself in hopes of getting traded. eUnited used Swarley as a temporary substitute and only placed top 12 at the CWL Anaheim Open. The decision was then made to trade Gunless for Clayster and the team would go on to finish an improved third-place finish in CWL Pro League Stage 2. After a good run of events with a changing roster the team had high hopes for 2017 Call of Duty Champs, but after losing a quarter-final series against Team Envy they were knocked down to the losers bracket and would ultimately be knocked out by Luminosity Gaming and place 5-6th.

=== Call of Duty: World War II (2017–2018 season) ===
The roster of Arcitys, Silly, Clayster, and Prestinni would remain unchanged going into the new season and was one of the few teams that didn't make a change from the prior year. The team placed top 6 at the first event at the CWL Dallas Open after losing in a close-fought match against eventual event winners Team Kaliber. The team then finished second in the CWL Northern Arena Showdown, but at the CWL New Orleans Open would once again be knocked out by eventual winners Team Kaliber for another top 6 placement. The team finished second at the Canadian Championship Series National Final but would go on to a series of disappointing tournaments, finishing top six at CWL Atlanta, top 16 at CWL Birmingham, and a top 6 placing at the CWL Pro League Stage 1. Hoping to break the run of bad form, the team replaced Silly for FeLo and placed third at the Seattle Open. The team then struggled only placing top 12 at the CWL Anaheim Open. The team improved in league play, finishing in the top four in the CWL Pro League Stage 2. At Call of Duty Champs 2018, the team would fall short of Team Kaliber in the winner's bracket, and would eventually fall to FaZe Clan for a top 4 placement.

=== Call of Duty: Black Ops 4 (2018–2019 season) ===
Going into the Black Ops 4 season and with the announcement of 5-man starting rosters the team dropped Felo for the rising star aBeZy and acquired the veteran Jkap. eUnited had a great showing at the first event, losing in the finals to Optic Gaming and placing second at the CWL Las Vegas Open. This placement would guarantee the team a spot in the 2019 CWL Pro League. Despite having a good start to the league going 5–2 in the first two weeks, roster rumors began to flair up however no roster change was made. After no roster changes were made the team finished with a very disappointing and lowest possible top 16 placement at CWL Fort Worth. After such a poor placement, eUnited decided to bench Jkap and would introduce the rising star Simp. The new roster would have a good showing at their first two events CWL London and CWL Anaheim placing 2nd and 4th respectively. At the 2019 CWL Pro League Playoffs Arcitys would have his first large success winning the tournament by taking down Gen.G in the finals. After winning the previous event eUnited were going in to Call of Duty Champs 2019 as favorites and would come away with back to back event wins and as 2019 Call of Duty World Champions by beating 100 Thieves in a game 5 thriller.

=== Call of Duty: Modern Warfare (2019–2020 season) ===
On October 24, 2019, it was announced by NRG Esports via its social media channels that Arcitys had joined its currently unnamed CDL Franchise, which on October 30, 2019, would be named Chicago Huntsmen.

=== Call of Duty: Black Ops Cold War (2020–2021 season) ===
On September 15, 2020, Arcitys joined Atlanta FaZe, reuniting him with eUnited teammates aBeZy and Simp. At the 2021 Call of Duty League Championship, Arcitys was able to capture his second ring, with the Atlanta FaZe defeating Toronto Ultra 5-3 in the grand finals.

=== Call of Duty: Vanguard (2021–2022 season) ===
For the 2021-2022 season, Arcitys remained in Atlanta, but the team struggled to recreate their success in Cold War, failing to win a single major championship before losing to the Los Angeles Thieves in the grand finals of the 2022 Call of Duty League Championship.

=== Call of Duty: Modern Warfare II (2022–2023 season) ===
For the 2022-2023 season, Arcitys left Atlanta FaZe and joined the Los Angeles Guerrillas.

=== Call of Duty: Modern Warfare III (2023–2024 season) ===
For the 2023-2024 season, Arcitys joined Seattle Surge. During the middle of the season, Arcitys was released from the team. After being released, Arcitys went to compete in the amateur scene and won the Call of Duty Challengers Championship, representing Lore Gaming.
