= 2023 Call of Duty League season =

- League: Call of Duty League
- Sport: Call of Duty: Modern Warfare II
- Duration: December 2, 2022 – June 18, 2023
- Teams: 12
- Season MVP: Paco "HyDra" Rusiewiez

Stage Champions
- Stage 1: New York Subliners
- Stage 2: Atlanta FaZe
- Stage 3: Toronto Ultra
- Stage 4: Los Angeles Thieves
- Stage 5: New York Subliners

Grand Finals
- Champions: New York Subliners
- Runners-up: Toronto Ultra
- Finals MVP: Matthew "KiSMET" Tinsley

Seasons
- ← 2022 2024 →

The 2023 Call of Duty League season was the fourth season of the Call of Duty League, an esports league based on the video game franchise Call of Duty.

== Teams ==
Team	Location	Joined	Owner
Atlanta FaZe	(United States) Atlanta, GA	2020	Atlanta Esports Ventures, FaZe Clan
Boston Breach	(United States) Boston, MA	2022	Kraft Sports Group
Florida Mutineers	(United States) Orlando, FL	2020	Misfits Gaming
London Royal Ravens	(United Kingdom) London, UK	2020	ReKTGlobal, Inc.
Los Angeles Guerrillas	(United States) Los Angeles, CA	2020	Kroenke Sports & Entertainment
Los Angeles Thieves	(United States) Los Angeles, CA	2021	100 Thieves
Minnesota ROKKR	(United States) Minneapolis, MN	2020	WISE Ventures
New York Subliners	(United States) New York City, NY	2020	NYXL
OpTic Texas	(United States) Dallas, TX	2020	OpTic Gaming
Seattle Surge	(United States) Seattle, WA	2020	Canucks Sports & Entertainment, Enthusiast Gaming
Toronto Ultra	(Canada) Toronto, ON	2020	OverActive Media
Vegas Legion	(United States) Las Vegas, NV	2020	c0ntact Gaming

== Regular season ==
The 2023 CDL season began on December 2, 2022. Teams competed in five Majors throughout the season, culminating in the Call of Duty Championship tournament in Las Vegas, Nevada. The five Majors were played in Raleigh, Boston, Arlington, Columbus, and Toronto. The Minnesota ROKKR also hosted two home series matches in Madison, Wisconsin and St. Paul, Minnesota during the Stage 4 and 5 qualifiers.

== Standings ==
2023 Call of Duty League standings
#	Team	Pts	EP	MW	ML	M%	GW	GL	G%
1	Atlanta FaZe	385	5	31	16	.660	112	81	.580
2	OpTic Texas	320	5	30	15	.667	101	76	.571
3	New York Subliners	320	5	31	17	.646	112	77	.593
4	Toronto Ultra	305	5	27	17	.614	105	73	.590
5	Los Angeles Thieves	285	5	27	19	.587	103	75	.579
6	Minnesota ROKKR	220	5	19	23	.452	76	86	.469
7	Boston Breach	190	5	18	20	.474	80	75	.516
8	Seattle Surge	190	5	18	21	.462	75	80	.484
9	Las Vegas Legion	170	5	18	21	.462	73	89	.451
10	Florida Mutineers	130	5	13	24	.351	54	89	.378
11	Los Angeles Guerrillas	80	5	9	25	.265	51	86	.372
12	London Royal Ravens	70	5	7	24	.226	40	81	.331

As of 28 May 2023

== Stage 1 ==
Stage 1 group stage began on December 2, 2022, and ended on December 14.

=== Group stage ===
Pos	Team	Overall Series	Overall Games
1	Minnesota ROKKR	3–1	10–6
2	Toronto Ultra	3–1	10–7
3	Atlanta FaZe	2–2	9–8
4	Boston Breach	2–2	9–8
5	Los Angeles Thieves	2–2	9–8
6	London Royal Ravens	2–2	9–8
7	OpTic Texas	2–2	8–8
8	Los Angeles Guerrillas	2–2	8–9
9	New York Subliners	2–2	7–8
10	Florida Mutineers	2–2	7–9
11	Seattle Surge	1–3	7–10
12	Las Vegas Legion	1–3	6–10

=== Major ===
The Stage 1 Major ran from December 14 through December 18, 2022, at the Raleigh Convention Center. All twelve CDL teams, alongside four Challengers teams, competed against each other. The teams were put into four groups of four, with three CDL teams and one Challengers team in each group. Teams played the other three teams in their group once, with the top two from each group advancing to a double elimination bracket.

Group A

Pos	Team	Overall Series	Overall Games	Qualification
1	New York Subliners	2–0	6–0	Winners Round 1
2	Minnesota ROKKR	2–1	6–4	Winners Round 1
3	Los Angeles Guerrillas	1–2	4–6	
4	Decimate Gaming	0–2	0–6	

Group B

Pos	Team	Overall Series	Overall Games	Qualification
1	Toronto Ultra	2–0	6–2	Winners Round 1
2	Florida Mutineers	2–1	8–6	Winners Round 1
3	OpTic Texas	1–2	5–8	
4	Pollodrom	0–2	3–6	

Group C

Pos	Team	Overall Series	Overall Games	Qualification
1	Atlanta FaZe	2–0	6–2	Winners Round 1
2	Seattle Surge	2–1	6–3	Winners Round 1
3	LAG Academy	1–2	5–8	
4	London Royal Ravens	0–2	2–6	

Group D

Pos	Team	Overall Series	Overall Games	Qualification
1	Los Angeles Thieves	2–0	6–3	Winners Round 1
2	Las Vegas Legion	2–1	8–7	Winners Round 1
3	Elevate	1–2	6–8	
4	Boston Breach	0–2	4–6	

=== Bracket ===
Winners Round 1	Winners Round 2	Winners Final	Final
New York Subliners	3
Florida Mutineers	1
New York Subliners	1
Seattle Surge	3
Los Angeles Thieves	1
Seattle Surge	3
Seattle Surge	3
Atlanta FaZe	2
Toronto Ultra	3
Minnesota ROKKR	1
Toronto Ultra	1
Atlanta FaZe	3
Atlanta FaZe	3
Las Vegas Legion	2	Seattle Surge	1
New York Subliners	4
Elimination Round 1	Elimination Round 2	Elimination Round 3	Elimination Final
Toronto Ultra	3
Florida Mutineers	0	Los Angeles Thieves	1	Atlanta FaZe	1
Los Angeles Thieves	3	Toronto Ultra	2	New York Subliners	3
New York Subliners	3
New York Subliners	3
Minnesota ROKKR	2	Las Vegas Legion	1
Las Vegas Legion	3

== Stage 2 ==
Stage 2 group stage began on January 13, 2023, and ended on January 29.

=== Group stage ===
Pos	Team	Overall Series	Overall Games	Qualification
1	OpTic Texas	4–1	13–10	Winners Round 1 Seed
2	Toronto Ultra	4–1	13–5	Winners Round 1 Seed
3	Boston Breach	3–2	13–8	Winners Round 1 Seed
4	New York Subliners	3–2	12–8	Winners Round 1 Seed
5	Minnesota ROKKR	3–2	10–9	Winners Round 1 Seed
6	Atlanta FaZe	3–2	11–10	Winners Round 1 Seed
7	Los Angeles Guerrillas	2–3	11–11	Winners Round 1 Seed
8	Los Angeles Thieves	2–3	8–11	Winners Round 1 Seed
9	Florida Mutineers	2–3	9–13	Losers Round 1 Seed
10	Las Vegas Legion	2–3	8–12	Losers Round 1 Seed
11	Seattle Surge	1–4	8–13	Losers Round 1 Seed
12	London Royal Ravens	1–4	7–13	Losers Round 1 Seed

=== Major ===
The Stage 2 Major ran from February 2 through February 5, 2023. The Major was hosted by Boston Breach.

Upper round 1	Upper round 2	Upper final	Final
1	OpTic Texas	3
8	Los Angeles Thieves	2
1	OpTic Texas	0
5	Minnesota ROKKR	3
4	New York Subliners	2
5	Minnesota ROKKR	3
5	Minnesota ROKKR	2
6	Atlanta FaZe	3
2	Toronto Ultra	3
7	Los Angeles Guerrillas	1
2	Toronto Ultra	0
6	Atlanta FaZe	3
3	Boston Breach	2
6	Atlanta FaZe	3
6	Atlanta FaZe	4
8	Los Angeles Thieves	2
Lower round 1	Lower round 2	Lower round 3	Lower round 4	Lower final
8	Los Angeles Thieves	3
2	Toronto Ultra	0
9	Florida Mutineers	0
8	Los Angeles Thieves	3	8	Los Angeles Thieves	3
4	New York Subliners	0	5	Minnesota ROKKR	0
4	New York Subliners	3
8	Los Angeles Thieves	3	8	Los Angeles Thieves	3
12	London Royal Ravens	1
1	OpTic Texas	1
7	Los Angeles Guerrillas	3
1	OpTic Texas	3
10	Las Vegas Legion	2
7	Los Angeles Guerrillas	0	3	Boston Breach	0
3	Boston Breach	3
3	Boston Breach	3
11	Seattle Surge	1

== Stage 3 ==
Stage 3 group stage began on February 17, 2023, and ended on March 5.

=== Group stage ===
Pos	Team	Overall Series	Overall Games	Qualification
1	Seattle Surge	4–1	13–5	Winners Round 1 Seed
2	Boston Breach	4–1	13–8	Winners Round 1 Seed
3	Toronto Ultra	3–2	12–7	Winners Round 1 Seed
4	Atlanta FaZe	3–2	11–7	Winners Round 1 Seed
5	Los Angeles Thieves	3–2	12–8	Winners Round 1 Seed
6	New York Subliners	3–2	9–8	Winners Round 1 Seed
7	OpTic Texas	3–2	9–9	Winners Round 1 Seed
8	Los Angeles Guerrillas	2–3	10–12	Winners Round 1 Seed
9	Las Vegas Legion	2–3	9–12	Losers Round 1 Seed
10	London Royal Ravens	2–3	9–13	Losers Round 1 Seed
11	Florida Mutineers	1–4	6–13	Losers Round 1 Seed
12	Minnesota ROKKR	0–5	4–15	Losers Round 1 Seed

=== Major ===
The Stage 3 Major ran from March 9 through March 12, 2023. The Major was hosted by OpTic Texas.

Upper round 1	Upper round 2	Upper final	Final
1	Seattle Surge	3
8	Los Angeles Guerrillas	2
1	Seattle Surge	2
4	Atlanta FaZe	3
4	Atlanta FaZe	3
5	Los Angeles Thieves	0
4	Atlanta FaZe	1
3	Toronto Ultra	3
2	Boston Breach	3
7	OpTic Texas	0
2	Boston Breach	2
3	Toronto Ultra	3
3	Toronto Ultra	3
6	New York Subliners	1
3	Toronto Ultra	4
7	OpTic Texas	2
Lower round 1	Lower round 2	Lower round 3	Lower round 4	Lower final
8	Los Angeles Guerrillas	1
2	Boston Breach	3
9	Las Vegas Legion	3
9	Las Vegas Legion	3	9	Las Vegas Legion	0
5	Los Angeles Thieves	1	4	Atlanta FaZe	1
5	Los Angeles Thieves	3
2	Boston Breach	1	7	OpTic Texas	3
12	Minnesota ROKKR	0
7	OpTic Texas	3
7	OpTic Texas	3
1	Seattle Surge	1
10	London Royal Ravens	2
7	OpTic Texas	3	7	OpTic Texas	3
11	Florida Mutineers	1
6	New York Subliners	1
11	Florida Mutineers	3

== Stage 4 ==
Stage 4 group stage began on March 31, 2023, and ended on April 16.

=== Group stage ===
Pos	Team	Overall Series	Overall Games	Qualification
1	OpTic Texas	5–0	15–3	Winners Round 1 Seed
2	Los Angeles Thieves	4–1	13–5	Winners Round 1 Seed
3	Seattle Surge	4–1	13–6	Winners Round 1 Seed
4	New York Subliners	4–1	13–7	Winners Round 1 Seed
5	Las Vegas Legion	4–1	13–9	Winners Round 1 Seed
6	Atlanta FaZe	3–2	11–11	Winners Round 1 Seed
7	Minnesota ROKKR	2–3	9–10	Winners Round 1 Seed
8	Boston Breach	2–3	8–12	Winners Round 1 Seed
9	Toronto Ultra	1–4	10–12	Losers Round 1 Seed
10	London Royal Ravens	1–4	5–13	Losers Round 1 Seed
11	Los Angeles Guerrillas	0–5	4–15	Losers Round 1 Seed
12	Florida Mutineers	0–5	4–15	Losers Round 1 Seed

=== Major ===
The Stage 4 Major ran from April 20 through April 23, 2023. The Major had no host.

Upper round 1	Upper round 2	Upper final	Final
1	OpTic Texas	3
8	Boston Breach	1
1	OpTic Texas	3
4	New York Subliners	0
4	New York Subliners	3
5	Las Vegas Legion	0
1	OpTic Texas	1
2	Los Angeles Thieves	3
2	Los Angeles Thieves	3
7	Minnesota ROKKR	1
2	Los Angeles Thieves	3
6	Atlanta FaZe	1
3	Seattle Surge	1
6	Atlanta FaZe	3
2	Los Angeles Thieves	4
1	OpTic Texas	2
Lower round 1	Lower round 2	Lower round 3	Lower round 4	Lower final
8	Boston Breach	1
6	Atlanta FaZe	3
9	Toronto Ultra	3
9	Toronto Ultra	3	9	Toronto Ultra	2
12	Florida Mutineers	0	1	OpTic Texas	3
5	Las Vegas Legion	2
6	Atlanta FaZe	3	6	Atlanta FaZe	0
12	Florida Mutineers	3
4	New York Subliners	2
7	Minnesota ROKKR	3
4	New York Subliners	3
10	London Royal Ravens	2
7	Minnesota ROKKR	3	7	Minnesota ROKKR	1
3	Seattle Surge	2
3	Seattle Surge	3
11	Los Angeles Guerrillas	2

== Stage 5 ==
Stage 5 group stage began on May 5, 2023, and ended on May 21.

=== Group stage ===
Pos	Team	Overall Series	Overall Games	Qualification
1	OpTic Texas	5–0	15–3	Winners Round 1 Seed
2	Atlanta FaZe	4–1	12–5	Winners Round 1 Seed
3	Toronto Ultra	3–2	12–7	Winners Round 1 Seed
4	Boston Breach	3–2	11–8	Winners Round 1 Seed
5	Minnesota ROKKR	3–2	12–9	Winners Round 1 Seed
6	New York Subliners	3–2	12–9	Winners Round 1 Seed
7	Las Vegas Legion	3–2	11–11	Winners Round 1 Seed
8	Florida Mutineers	3–2	9–9	Winners Round 1 Seed
9	Los Angeles Thieves	1–4	8–12	Losers Round 1 Seed
10	Seattle Surge	1–4	5–13	Losers Round 1 Seed
11	Los Angeles Guerrillas	1–4	5–13	Losers Round 1 Seed
12	London Royal Ravens	0–5	2–15	Losers Round 1 Seed

=== Major ===
The Stage 5 Major ran from May 25 through May 28, 2023. The Major was hosted by Toronto Ultra.

Upper round 1	Upper round 2	Upper final	Final
1	OpTic Texas	0
8	Florida Mutineers	3
8	Florida Mutineers	0
5	Minnesota RØKKR	3
4	Boston Breach	2
5	Minnesota ROKKR	3
5	Minnesota RØKKR	0
2	Atlanta FaZe	3
2	Atlanta FaZe	3
7	Las Vegas Legion	0
2	Atlanta FaZe	3
3	Toronto Ultra	1
3	Toronto Ultra	3
6	New York Subliners	2
2	Atlanta FaZe	3
6	New York Subliners	4
Lower round 1	Lower round 2	Lower round 3	Lower round 4	Lower final
1	OpTic Texas	0
3	Toronto Ultra	3
9	Los Angeles Thieves	3
9	Los Angeles Thieves	3	9	Los Angeles Thieves	0
12	London Royal Ravens	0	5	Minnesota RØKKR	0
4	Boston Breach	1
3	Toronto Ultra	2	6	New York Subliners	3
12	London Royal Ravens	3
6	New York Subliners	3
7	Las Vegas Legion	3
8	Florida Mutineers	0
10	Seattle Surge	0
7	Las Vegas Legion	0	6	New York Subliners	3
6	New York Subliners	3
6	New York Subliners	3
11	Los Angeles Guerrillas	0

== Championship ==
The 2023 Call of Duty League Championship took place from June 15 through June 18, 2023. The top eight teams from the regular season standings competed in a Double Elimination bracket.

=== Bracket ===
Winners Round 1	Winners Round 2	Winners Final	Final
1	Atlanta FaZe	3
8	Seattle Surge	1
1	Atlanta Faze	1
4	Toronto Ultra	3
4	Toronto Ultra	3
5	Los Angeles Thieves	2
4	Toronto Ultra	3
3	New York Subliners	0
2	OpTic Texas	3
7	Boston Breach	1
2	OpTic Texas	1
3	New York Subliners	3
3	New York Subliners	3
6	Minnesota RØKKR	2	4	Toronto Ultra	0
3	New York Subliners	5
Elimination Round 1	Elimination Round 2	Elimination Round 3	Elimination Final
2	OpTic Texas	2
8	Seattle Surge	3	8	Seattle Surge	3	3	New York Subliners	3
5	Los Angeles Thieves	2	8	Seattle Surge	1	1	Atlanta Faze	1
1	Atlanta Faze	3
1	Atlanta Faze	3
7	Boston Breach	3	7	Boston Breach	1
6	Minnesota RØKKR	1

=== Grand finals ===
The 2023 Call of Duty League season Grand finals were held on June 18, 2023. It was best of 9 (first to 5).

Grand Finals	June 18	Toronto Ultra	0	–	5	New York Subliners
	12:00 PDT/15:00 EDT (19:00 UTC)					
		84	Zarqwa Hydroelectric - Hardpoint			250
		1	Breenbergh Hotel - Search & Destroy			6
		0	Breenbergh Hotel - Control			3
		236	Breenbergh Hotel - Hardpoint			250
		4	Embassy - Search & Destroy			6

== Broadcast and viewership ==
In early 2020, Activision Blizzard signed a three-year broadcasting rights deal with YouTube, making the streaming platform the exclusive broadcasting partner for the CDL. The 2023 CDL season marks the first season since the expiration of the deal. In December 2022, the CDL announced that it would be broadcasting the entirety of the season exclusively on Twitch and its official website.

The opening weekend of the 2023 season saw record viewership. The highest viewed match was OpTic Texas versus the Florida Mutineers, which reached a peak of over 190,000 on Twitch. The peak viewership made it the fourth-most watched CDL match of match of all time, only behind the three championship matches from 2020 to 2022.
