= 2026 Call of Duty League season =

- League: Call of Duty League
- Sport: Call of Duty: Black Ops 7
- Duration: December 5, 2025 – July 19, 2026
- Teams: 12
- Season MVP: Thomas "Scrap" Ernst

Major Champions
- Major 1: Paris Gentle Mates
- Major 2: FaZe Vegas
- Major 3: Los Angeles Thieves
- Major 4: OpTic Texas

Grand Finals
- Champions: FaZe Vegas
- Runners-up: OpTic Texas
- Finals MVP: Chris "Simp" Lehr

Seasons
- ← 2025 2027 →

The 2026 Call of Duty League season will be the seventh season of the Call of Duty League, an esports league based on the video game franchise Call of Duty.

== Teams ==
| Team | Location | Joined | Owner |
|---|---|---|---|
| Boston Breach | (United States) Boston, MA | 2022 | Kraft Sports Group |
| Carolina Royal Ravens | (United States) Charlotte, NC | 2020 | ReKTGlobal, Inc. |
| Cloud9 New York | (United States) New York City, NY | 2020 | Cloud9 |
| FaZe Vegas | (United States) Las Vegas, NV | 2020 | Atlanta Esports Ventures, FaZe Clan |
| G2 Minnesota | (United States) Minneapolis–Saint Paul, MN | 2020 | G2 Esports |
| Los Angeles Thieves | (United States) Los Angeles, CA | 2021 | 100 Thieves |
| Miami Heretics | (United States) Miami, FL | 2020 | Misfits Gaming, Team Heretics |
| OpTic Texas | (United States) Dallas, TX | 2020 | OpTic Gaming |
| Paris Gentle Mates | (France) Paris | 2020 | Gentle Mates |
| Riyadh Falcons | (Saudi Arabia) Riyadh | 2020 | Team Falcons |
| Toronto KOI | (Canada) Toronto, ON | 2020 | OverActive Media, Movistar KOI |
| Vancouver Surge | (Canada) Vancouver, BC | 2020 | Canucks Sports & Entertainment, Enthusiast Gaming |

== Regular season ==
The 2026 CDL season will begin on December 5, 2025. Teams will compete in four Majors throughout the season, culminating in the Call of Duty Championship tournament. This season the four majors are split between the United States and Europe and will be held in the cities of Dallas, Birmingham in the United Kingdom, Atlanta and Paris respectively.

== Standings ==
2026 Call of Duty League standings
| # | Team | Pts | EP | MW | ML | M% | GW | GL | G% |
|---|---|---|---|---|---|---|---|---|---|
| 1 | OpTic Texas | 575 | 4 | 40 | 12 | .769 | 139 | 70 | .665 |
| 2 | Los Angeles Thieves | 500 | 4 | 38 | 15 | .717 | 134 | 79 | .629 |
| 3 | FaZe Vegas | 440 | 4 | 33 | 21 | .611 | 120 | 93 | .563 |
| 4 | Paris Gentle Mates | 380 | 4 | 29 | 23 | .558 | 109 | 101 | .519 |
| 5 | Toronto KOI | 290 | 4 | 26 | 23 | .531 | 98 | 85 | .536 |
| 6 | G2 Minnesota | 250 | 4 | 21 | 26 | .447 | 89 | 94 | .486 |
| 7 | Riyadh Falcons | 240 | 4 | 24 | 20 | .545 | 88 | 82 | .518 |
| 8 | Miami Heretics | 235 | 4 | 22 | 23 | .489 | 88 | 86 | .506 |
| 9 | Carolina Royal Ravens | 150 | 4 | 16 | 22 | .421 | 65 | 85 | .433 |
| 10 | Boston Breach | 115 | 4 | 12 | 25 | .324 | 58 | 92 | .387 |
| 11 | Vancouver Surge | 95 | 4 | 10 | 27 | .270 | 44 | 91 | .326 |
| 12 | Cloud9 New York | 30 | 4 | 4 | 31 | .114 | 38 | 97 | .281 |

As of 28 June 2026

== Major 1 ==
Major 1 online qualifiers began on December 5, 2025, and ended on January 25, 2026. The Major was hosted by OpTic Texas in Dallas, United States. The champions were the Paris Gentle Mates, who defeated OpTic Texas 4-3.

=== Online qualifiers ===
| Pos | Team | Overall Series | Overall Games | Qualification |
|---|---|---|---|---|
| 1 | Paris Gentle Mates | 5–2 | 18–11 | Winners Round 1 Seed |
| 2 | FaZe Vegas | 5–2 | 16–10 | Winners Round 1 Seed |
| 3 | Riyadh Falcons | 5–2 | 16–12 | Winners Round 1 Seed |
| 4 | Carolina Royal Ravens | 5–2 | 16–13 | Winners Round 1 Seed |
| 5 | Los Angeles Thieves | 4–3 | 14–13 | Winners Round 1 Seed |
| 6 | OpTic Texas | 4–3 | 14–13 | Winners Round 1 Seed |
| 7 | G2 Minnesota | 3–4 | 16–15 | Winners Round 1 Seed |
| 8 | Toronto KOI | 3–4 | 14–14 | Winners Round 1 Seed |
| 9 | Miami Heretics | 3–4 | 15–15 | Losers Round 1 Seed |
| 10 | Boston Breach | 3–4 | 15–17 | Losers Round 1 Seed |
| 11 | Vancouver Surge | 1–6 | 13–18 | Losers Round 1 Seed |
| 12 | Cloud9 New York | 1–6 | 4–20 | Losers Round 1 Seed |

=== Major ===
Upper round 1 | Upper round 2 | Upper final | Final
1 | Paris Gentle Mates | 3
8 | Toronto KOI | 1
1 | Paris Gentle Mates | 3
5 | Los Angeles Thieves | 0
4 | Carolina Royal Ravens | 0
5 | Los Angeles Thieves | 3
1 | Paris Gentle Mates | 0
6 | OpTic Texas | 3
2 | FaZe Vegas | 0
7 | G2 Minnesota | 3
7 | G2 Minnesota | 0
6 | OpTic Texas | 3
3 | Riyadh Falcons | 0
6 | OpTic Texas | 3
6 | OpTic Texas | 3
1 | Paris Gentle Mates | 4
Lower round 1 | Lower round 2 | Lower round 3 | Lower round 4 | Lower final
8 | Toronto KOI | 2
7 | G2 Minnesota | 3
9 | Miami Heretics | 3
9 | Miami Heretics | 3 | 9 | Miami Heretics | 0
12 | Vancouver Surge | 0 | 1 | Paris Gentle Mates | 3
4 | Carolina Royal Ravens | 1
7 | G2 Minnesota | 2 | 2 | FaZe Vegas | 2
12 | Vancouver Surge | 3
2 | FaZe Vegas | 3
2 | FaZe Vegas | 3
5 | Los Angeles Thieves | 0
10 | Boston Breach | 1
2 | FaZe Vegas | 3 | 2 | FaZe Vegas | 3
3 | Riyadh Falcons | 2
3 | Riyadh Falcons | 3
11 | Cloud9 New York | 1

== Major 2 ==
Major 2 online qualifiers began on February 13, 2026, and ended on March 22, 2026. Only 10 teams attended the LAN event. The top 6 teams automatically qualified to the main bracket, teams 7 to 10 played a single elimination match to determine the 2 remaining teams that played in the bracket.

The champions were the FaZe Vegas, who defeated OpTic Texas 4-1.

=== Online qualifiers ===
| Pos | Team | Overall Series | Overall Games | Qualification |
|---|---|---|---|---|
| 1 | OpTic Texas | 10–1 | 31–10 | Main bracket |
| 2 | Miami Heretics | 7–4 | 25–14 | Main bracket |
| 3 | Los Angeles Thieves | 7–4 | 26–17 | Main bracket |
| 4 | Riyadh Falcons | 6–5 | 24–18 | Main bracket |
| 5 | FaZe Vegas | 6–5 | 22–19 | Main bracket |
| 6 | G2 Minnesota | 6–5 | 20–20 | Main bracket |
| 7 | Carolina Royal Ravens | 6–5 | 20–20 | Play-in |
| 8 | Toronto KOI | 5–6 | 18–19 | Play-in |
| 9 | Vancouver Surge | 4–7 | 14–26 | Play-in |
| 10 | Paris Gentle Mates | 4–7 | 21–25 | Play-in |
| 11 | Boston Breach | 3–8 | 14–27 | |
| 12 | Cloud9 New York | 2–9 | 11–31 | |

=== Major ===
==== Play-in ====
Play-in
8 | Toronto KOI | 3
9 | Vancouver Surge | 1
7 | Carolina Royal Ravens | 1
10 | Paris Gentle Mates | 3

==== Main bracket ====
Upper round 1 | Upper round 2 | Upper final | Final
1 | OpTic Texas | 3
8 | Toronto KOI | 0
1 | OpTic Texas | 3
6 | G2 Minnesota | 0
6 | G2 Minnesota | 3
4 | Riyadh Falcons | 0
1 | OpTic Texas | 3
5 | FaZe Vegas | 1
3 | Los Angeles Thieves | 2
5 | FaZe Vegas | 3
5 | FaZe Vegas | 3
10 | Paris Gentle Mates | 0
2 | Miami Heretics | 1
10 | Paris Gentle Mates | 3 | 1 | OpTic Texas | 1
5 | FaZe Vegas | 4
Lower round 1 | Lower round 2 | Lower round 3 | Lower final
10 | Paris Gentle Mates | 1
8 | Toronto KOI | 3 | 8 | Toronto KOI | 3 | 5 | FaZe Vegas | 3
4 | Riyadh Falcons | 0 | 8 | Toronto KOI | 3 | 8 | Toronto KOI | 1
3 | Los Angeles Thieves | 0
6 | G2 Minnesota | 1
2 | Miami Heretics | 0 | 3 | Los Angeles Thieves | 3
3 | Los Angeles Thieves | 3

== Major 3 ==
Major 3 online qualifiers began on April 17, 2026, and ended on May 10, 2026. This event was a Pro-Am and featured four challengers teams.

The champions were the Los Angeles Thieves, who defeated OpTic Texas 4-3.

=== Online qualifiers ===
| Pos | Team | Overall Series | Overall Games |
|---|---|---|---|
| 1 | OpTic Texas | 5–0 | 15–6 |
| 2 | Toronto KOI | 4–1 | 14–6 |
| 3 | Los Angeles Thieves | 3–2 | 12–8 |
| 4 | FaZe Vegas | 3–2 | 12–9 |
| 5 | Riyadh Falcons | 3–2 | 11–9 |
| 6 | Paris Gentle Mates | 3–2 | 11–10 |
| 7 | Carolina Royal Ravens | 2–3 | 11–12 |
| 8 | G2 Minnesota | 2–3 | 9–10 |
| 9 | Vancouver Surge | 2–3 | 8–11 |
| 10 | Miami Heretics | 2–3 | 8–12 |
| 11 | Boston Breach | 1–4 | 7–14 |
| 12 | Cloud9 New York | 0–5 | 4–15 |

=== Major ===
==== Group stage ====
Group A

First Round
OpTic Texas | 3
OMIT | 0
Winner's bracket
G2 Minnesota | 3
Vancouver Surge | 1
OMIT | 3
Vancouver Surge | 0
Loser's bracket

Second Round
OpTic Texas | 3
G2 Minnesota | 1
G2 Minnesota | 3
OMIT | 0

Group B

First Round
Toronto KOI | 3
Huntsmen | 0
Winner's bracket
Carolina Royal Ravens | 0
Miami Heretics | 3
Huntsmen | 2
Carolina Royal Ravens | 3
Loser's bracket

Second Round
Toronto KOI | 3
Miami Heretics | 1
Miami Heretics | 3
Carolina Royal Ravens | 1

Group C

First Round
Los Angeles Thieves | 3
Project Notorious | 1
Winner's bracket
Paris Gentle Mates | 1
Boston Breach | 3
Project Notorious | 2
Paris Gentle Mates | 3
Loser's bracket

Second Round
Los Angeles Thieves | 3
Boston Breach | 0
Boston Breach | 1
Paris Gentle Mates | 3

Group D

First Round
FaZe Vegas | 3
ROC Esports | 1
Winner's bracket
Riyadh Falcons | 3
Cloud9 New York | 0
ROC Esports | 0
Cloud9 New York | 3
Loser's bracket

Second Round
FaZe Vegas | 0
Riyadh Falcons | 3
FaZe Vegas | 3
Cloud9 New York | 0

==== Playoffs ====
Upper round 1 | Upper round 2 | Upper final | Final
OpTic Texas | 3
Miami Heretics | 0
OpTic Texas | 3
Riyadh Falcons | 2
Riyadh Falcons | 3
Paris Gentle Mates | 0
OpTic Texas | 3
Toronto KOI | 2
Toronto KOI | 3
G2 Minnesota | 2
Toronto KOI | 3
FaZe Vegas | 1
Los Angeles Thieves | 2
FaZe Vegas | 3 | OpTic Texas | 3
Los Angeles Thieves | 4
Lower round 1 | Lower round 2 | Lower round 3 | Lower final
FaZe Vegas | 3
Miami Heretics | 2 | Paris Gentle Mates | 1 | Toronto KOI | 0
Paris Gentle Mates | 3 | FaZe Vegas | 1 | Los Angeles Thieves | 3
Los Angeles Thieves | 3
Riyadh Falcons | 0
G2 Minnesota | 1 | Los Angeles Thieves | 3
Los Angeles Thieves | 3

== Major 4 ==
Major 4 online qualifiers began on May 29, 2026, and ended on June 21, 2026.

The champions were OpTic Texas, who defeated Los Angeles Thieves 4-3.

=== Online qualifiers ===
| Pos | Team | Overall Series | Overall Games | Qualification |
|---|---|---|---|---|
| 1 | Los Angeles Thieves | 5–0 | 15–7 | Winners Round 1 Seed |
| 2 | Riyadh Falcons | 4–1 | 12–9 | Winners Round 1 Seed |
| 3 | OpTic Texas | 3–2 | 13–8 | Winners Round 1 Seed |
| 4 | Paris Gentle Mates | 3–2 | 11–7 | Winners Round 1 Seed |
| 5 | FaZe Vegas | 3–2 | 12–8 | Winners Round 1 Seed |
| 6 | Boston Breach | 3–2 | 12–10 | Winners Round 1 Seed |
| 7 | G2 Minnesota | 2–3 | 12–12 | Winners Round 1 Seed |
| 8 | Carolina Royal Ravens | 2–3 | 8–11 | Winners Round 1 Seed |
| 9 | Miami Heretics | 2–3 | 8–11 | Losers Round 1 Seed |
| 10 | Toronto KOI | 2–3 | 9–13 | Losers Round 1 Seed |
| 11 | Vancouver Surge | 1–4 | 5–12 | Losers Round 1 Seed |
| 12 | Cloud9 New York | 0–5 | 6–15 | Losers Round 1 Seed |

=== Major ===
Upper round 1 | Upper round 2 | Upper final | Final
1 | Los Angeles Thieves | 3
8 | Carolina Royal Ravens | 0
1 | Los Angeles Thieves | 3
5 | FaZe Vegas | 2
4 | Paris Gentle Mates | 1
5 | FaZe Vegas | 3
1 | Los Angeles Thieves | 3
3 | OpTic Texas | 0
2 | Riyadh Falcons | 2
7 | G2 Minnesota | 3
7 | G2 Minnesota | 0
3 | OpTic Texas | 3
3 | OpTic Texas | 3
6 | Boston Breach | 1
1 | Los Angeles Thieves | 3
3 | OpTic Texas | 4
Lower round 1 | Lower round 2 | Lower round 3 | Lower round 4 | Lower final
8 | Carolina Royal Ravens | 2
7 | G2 Minnesota | 1
9 | Miami Heretics | 3
9 | Miami Heretics | 2 | 4 | Paris Gentle Mates | 3
4 | Paris Gentle Mates | 3 | 3 | OpTic Texas | 3
4 | Paris Gentle Mates | 3
4 | Paris Gentle Mates | 3 | 4 | Paris Gentle Mates | 0
12 | Cloud9 New York | 0
5 | FaZe Vegas | 2
2 | Riyadh Falcons | 0
5 | FaZe Vegas | 3
10 | Toronto KOI | 3
10 | Toronto KOI | 3 | 10 | Toronto KOI | 0
6 | Boston Breach | 0
6 | Boston Breach | 3
11 | Vancouver Surge | 2

== Championships ==
The 2025 Call of Duty League Championship took place at the Michelob Ultra Arena in Las Vegas, United States from July 16 to 19.

=== Bracket ===
Winners Round 1 | Winners Round 2 | Winners Final | Final
1 | OpTic Texas | 3
8 | Miami Heretics | 0
1 | OpTic Texas | 3
4 | Paris Gentle Mates | 1
4 | Paris Gentle Mates | 3
5 | Toronto KOI | 0
1 | OpTic Texas | 2
3 | FaZe Vegas | 3
2 | Los Angeles Thieves | 1
7 | Riyadh Falcons | 3
7 | Riyadh Falcons | 0
3 | FaZe Vegas | 3
3 | FaZe Vegas | 3
6 | G2 Minnesota | 1 | 3 | FaZe Vegas | 5
1 | OpTic Texas | 2
Elimination Round 1 | Elimination Round 2 | Elimination Round 3 | Elimination Final
7 | Riyadh Falcons | 3
8 | Miami Heretics | 3 | 8 | Miami Heretics | 0 | 1 | OpTic Texas | 3
5 | Toronto KOI | 2 | 7 | Riyadh Falcons | 3 | 7 | Riyadh Falcons | 1
4 | Paris Gentle Mates | 2
4 | Paris Gentle Mates | 3
2 | Los Angeles Thieves | 2 | 6 | G2 Minnesota | 0
6 | G2 Minnesota | 3

=== Grand final ===
FaZe Vegas (host eSports CDL team) to compete against the 2025 CDL champions team OpTic Texas in best of 9 (first to 5) at 3:00 PM (15:00) venue time (PDT), translating to 6:00 PM (18:00) EDT, and 22:00 UTC, on Sunday, July 19, 2026, the timing is to avoid conflict with the 2026 FIFA World Cup final to occur 3 hours prior of Argentina/Spain.

| Grand Finals | July 19 | FaZe Vegas | 5 | – | 2 | OpTic Texas |
| | 15:00 PDT/18:00 EDT (22:00 UTC) | | | | | |
| | | 216 | Colossus - Hardpoint | | | 250 |
| | | 6 | Raid - Search & Destroy | | | 5 |
| | | 4 | Scar - Overload | | | 3 |
| | | 250 | Scar - Hardpoint | | | 194 |
| | | 6 | Den - Search & Destroy | | | 5 |
| | | 3 | Den - Overload | | | 4 |
| | | 6 | Hacienda - Search & Destroy | | | 5 |
