= Miami Heretics =

Call of Duty League esports team

- Founded: August 20, 2019; 7 years ago
- League: Call of Duty League
- Team history: Florida Mutineers (2019–2023); Miami Heretics (2023–present)
- Based in: Miami, Florida, U.S.
- Arena: None
- Colors
- Parent group: Team Heretics
- Website: Official website

The Miami Heretics (formerly Florida Mutineers) are an American professional Call of Duty League (CDL) esports team based in Miami, Florida. The Heretics are owned by Team Heretics.

== History ==
=== Florida Mutineers ===
On August 20, 2019, Activision Blizzard announced that Misfits Gaming had purchased one of the two new franchise slots for the Call of Duty League. According to ESPN, the publisher was looking to sell slots for approximately $25 million per team. On October 28, 2019, branding was revealed as the Florida Mutineers. On December 2, 2019, they revealed the five-man starting roster of Prestinni, Frosty, Skyz, Havok, and Maux and coach Atura.

After splitting their first two series of the 2020 season at the CDL 2020 Launch Weekend event, the Mutineers outperformed expectations at the Atlanta FaZe Home Series. After losing 3–2 to the London Royal Ravens in their first series, Florida survived elimination matches against Optic Gaming Los Angeles and London, taking these series 3-1 and 3–2, respectively. In the semifinals, Prestinni and the Mutineers ousted twin Arcitys and the Chicago Huntsmen 3–2 to meet the Atlanta FaZe in the finals, where they would lose 3–0.

Sometime prior to their next event, CDL Los Angeles, Prestinni made the decision to take some time away from the competitive scene, leading to the team's signing and immediate starting of Maurice "Fero" Henriquez. This would turn out to be a permanent move, however, as Fero would remain in the starting lineup even after Prestinni's return in late March 2020. The new lineup of Fero, Frosty, Skyz, Havok, and Maux would fall short at CDL Los Angeles, going 1–2 in matches with a 3-7 map count. They would bounce back with an event win at CDL Dallas, making a loser's bracket run before dropping the Minnesota ROKKR in the finals for their first win of the 2020 season. An early exit from their own home series, however, would prove to be the catalyst for change. An underperforming Maux was replaced with standout amateur player Joe "Owakening" Conley prior to CDL Minnesota. The new lineup saw unprecedented success across the next two events; Owakening, Fero, Frosty, Havok, and Skyz blitzed through CDL Minnesota and CDL Paris with an 8-0 match record and 24-9 map count.

=== Miami Heretics ===
On 24 August 2023, Florida Mutineers announced that the team would be rebranded to Miami Heretics following a partnership with Spanish esports organization Team Heretics. As part of the announcement, the team announced an all Spanish roster for the 2024 season. In October 2026, Team Heretics fully acquired the franchise spot from Misfits Gaming, becoming the full-owners of the team.

== Team Identity ==
The Miami Heretics' colors are orange and blue.

== Current roster ==
Miami Heretics roster
Players
Coaches

Handle	Name	Nationality
MettalZ	Serrano, Adrián	Spain
ReeaL	Fernández, José	Spain
Snoopy	Lozano, Eric	Mexico
SupeR	Escudero, Diego	Spain

Head coach

Jorge "MethodZ" Bancells

Assistant coach(es)

Alejandro "Lucky" López

Legend:
- (I) Inactive
- (S) Suspended
- Substitute
- (injured) Injury / Illness

Latest roster transaction: October 6, 2026.

== Awards and records ==
=== Seasons overview ===
Season	Regular season							Finish	Playoffs	Note
Season	P	MW	ML	MW%	GW	GL	GW%	Finish	Playoffs	Note
2020	32	20	12	.625	69	61	.531	3rd	7-8th, Lost in Losers round 3, 1-3 (OGLA)	As Florida Mutineers
2021	36	17	19	.472	69	70	.496	8th	7-8th, Lost in Losers round 1, 0-3 (OpTic)	As Florida Mutineers
2022	31	13	18	.419	54	67	.446	9th	Did not qualify	As Florida Mutineers
2023	37	13	24	.351	54	89	.378	10th	Did not qualify	As Florida Mutineers
2024	39	17	22	.436	69	82	.457	8th	5-6th, Lost in Losers round 2, 0-3 (Thieves)	As Miami Heretics
2025	40	20	20	.500	82	83	.497	5th	4th, Lost in Losers round 3, 2-3 (Surge)	As Miami Heretics
2026	45	22	23	.489	88	86	.506	8th	5-6th, Lost in Losers round 2, 0-3 (Falcons)	As Miami Heretics

=== Tournament wins ===
==== Florida Mutineers ====
Date	Prize	Event	Roster
2020-04-12	$50,000	Call of Duty League 2020 Week 5 - Dallas	Havok • Maux • Skyz • Frosty • Fero • Atura (coach)
2020-06-14	$50,000	Call of Duty League 2020 Week 9 - Minnesota	Havok • Skyz • Frosty • Fero • Owakening • Atura (coach)
2020-06-21	$50,000	Call of Duty League 2020 Week 10 - Paris	Havok • Skyz • Frosty • Fero • Owakening • Atura (coach)

=== Individual accomplishments ===
Rookie of the year

- RenKor (David Isern) – 2025

2nd Team All-Star

- RenKor (David Isern) – 2025
