= 2021 Call of Duty League season =

2021 Call of Duty League Season
- League: Call of Duty League
- Sport: Call of Duty: Black Ops Cold War
- Duration: January 23 – August 22, 2021
- Teams: 12
- Season MVP: Chris "Simp" Lehr

Stage Champions
- Stage 1: Atlanta FaZe
- Stage 2: Toronto Ultra
- Stage 3: Atlanta FaZe
- Stage 4: Atlanta FaZe
- Stage 5: Minnesota ROKKR

Grand Finals
- Champions: Atlanta FaZe
- Runners-up: Toronto Ultra
- Finals MVP: Tyler "aBeZy" Pharris

Seasons
- ← 2020 2022 →

The 2021 Call of Duty League season was the second season for the Call of Duty League, an esports league based on the video game franchise Call of Duty.

== Teams ==
| Team | Location | Joined | Owner |
|---|---|---|---|
| Atlanta FaZe | (United States) Atlanta, GA | 2020 | Atlanta Esports Ventures, FaZe Clan |
| OpTic Chicago | (United States) Chicago, IL | 2020 | NRG Esports |
| Dallas Empire | (United States) Dallas, TX | 2020 | Envy Gaming |
| Florida Mutineers | (United States) Orlando, FL | 2020 | Misfits Gaming |
| London Royal Ravens | (United Kingdom) London, UK | 2020 | ReKTGlobal, Inc. |
| Los Angeles Guerrillas | (United States) Los Angeles, CA | 2020 | Kroenke Sports & Entertainment |
| Los Angeles Thieves | (United States) Los Angeles, CA | 2021 | 100 Thieves |
| Minnesota ROKKR | (United States) Minneapolis, MN | 2020 | WISE Ventures |
| New York Subliners | (United States) New York City, NY | 2020 | Andbox |
| Paris Legion | Paris, France | 2020 | c0ntact Gaming |
| Seattle Surge | (United States) Seattle, WA | 2020 | Canucks Sports & Entertainment, Enthusiast Gaming |
| Toronto Ultra | (Canada) Toronto, ON | 2020 | OverActive Media |

== Regular season ==
=== Format ===
For the 2021 season, the twelve teams are evenly split into two groups of six teams each. The season consists of five stages, with teams playing group play matches over the course of three weeks to determine seeding for that stage's Major. For Stage 1, the finalists of 2020 season Dallas Empire and Atlanta FaZe got to pick which teams plays in which group, with Dallas Empire first getting to pick a team for the group of Atlanta FaZe, followed by Atlanta FaZe picking a team for the group of Dallas Empire. The team which was picked by Dallas Empire for the group of Atlanta FaZe then got to pick a team for the group of Dallas Empire, with this process continuing until both groups consist of 6 teams. The six teams in each group will then play each other over the course of three weeks to determine seeding, with teams being awarded 10 CDL Points for each victory. At each Major, teams are awarded CDL Points based on their final standings; 75 CDL Points for 1st place, 60 CDL Points for 2nd place, 50 CDL Points for 3rd place, 40 CDL Points for 4th place, 30 CDL Points for 5th/6th place, 20 CDL Points for 7th/8th place, 10 CDL Points for 9th/10th place and no CDL Points for 11th/12th place. For Stage 2, the top two teams from the Stage 1 Major will have the first two picks for the Stage 2 groups, repeating the same process before Stage 1 kicked off.

=== Prize pool distribution ===
The prize pool distribution has changed heavily since the 2020 season. This is due to the increase of the prize pool as well as all 12 teams qualifying for each major tournament. There is $500,000 for each major event and $2,500,000 for the playoffs making a total of about $5,000,000 for the whole season in prizes.

Majors:

- 1st Place = $200,000
- 2nd Place = $120,000
- 3rd Place = $80,000
- 4th Place = $40,000
- 5th/6th Place = $20,000 per team
- 7th/8th Place = $10,000 per team
- 9th-12th Place = $0

Playoffs:

- 1st Place = $1,200,000
- 2nd Place = $650,000
- 3rd Place = $300,000
- 4th Place = $150,000
- 5th/6th Place = $75,000 per team
- 7th/8th Place = $25,000 per team
- 9th-12th Place = $0

== Standings ==
2021 Call of Duty League standings
| # | Team | Pts | EP | MW | ML | M% | GW | GL | G% |
|---|---|---|---|---|---|---|---|---|---|
| 1 | Atlanta FaZe | 525 | 5 | 34 | 7 | .829 | 122 | 53 | .697 |
| 2 | Toronto Ultra | 415 | 5 | 29 | 17 | .630 | 113 | 79 | .589 |
| 3 | Dallas Empire | 400 | 5 | 26 | 18 | .591 | 99 | 84 | .541 |
| 4 | OpTic Chicago | 360 | 5 | 26 | 18 | .591 | 97 | 74 | .567 |
| 5 | New York Subliners | 340 | 5 | 24 | 17 | .585 | 85 | 81 | .512 |
| 6 | Minnesota ROKKR | 305 | 5 | 20 | 17 | .541 | 75 | 73 | .507 |
| 7 | Los Angeles Thieves | 240 | 5 | 18 | 21 | .462 | 74 | 83 | .471 |
| 8 | Florida Mutineers | 210 | 5 | 17 | 19 | .472 | 69 | 70 | .496 |
| 9 | Seattle Surge | 120 | 5 | 11 | 25 | .306 | 56 | 85 | .397 |
| 10 | London Royal Ravens | 110 | 5 | 9 | 23 | .281 | 45 | 79 | .363 |
| 11 | Los Angeles Guerrillas | 100 | 5 | 8 | 26 | .235 | 44 | 87 | .336 |
| 12 | Paris Legion | 100 | 5 | 8 | 22 | .267 | 42 | 73 | .365 |

== Stage 1 ==
Stage 1 group stages began on February 11, 2021, and ended on February 28.

Group A

| Pos | Team | Overall Series | Overall Games | Qualification |
|---|---|---|---|---|
| 1 | Dallas Empire | 4–1 | 14–7 | Winners Round 2 Seed |
| 2 | Los Angeles Thieves | 4–1 | 12–7 | Winners Round 1 Seed |
| 3 | New York Subliners | 3–2 | 11–7 | Winners Round 1 Seed |
| 4 | Minnesota ROKKR | 3–2 | 10–8 | Losers Round 2 Seed |
| 5 | Seattle Surge | 1–4 | 6–14 | Losers Round 1 Seed |
| 6 | London Royal Ravens | 0–5 | 5–15 | Losers Round 1 Seed |

Group B

| Pos | Team | Overall Series | Overall Games | Qualification |
|---|---|---|---|---|
| 1 | Atlanta FaZe | 5–0 | 15–6 | Winners Round 2 Seed |
| 2 | OpTic Chicago | 4–1 | 14–6 | Winners Round 1 Seed |
| 3 | Los Angeles Guerrillas | 2–3 | 8–13 | Winners Round 1 Seed |
| 4 | Paris Legion | 2–3 | 10–11 | Losers Round 2 Seed |
| 5 | Toronto Ultra | 1–4 | 9–13 | Losers Round 1 Seed |
| 6 | Florida Mutineers | 1–4 | 6–13 | Losers Round 1 Seed |

=== Major ===
The Stage 1 Major ran from March 3 to March 7, 2021. Atlanta FaZe won the Major, with the Dallas Empire as the runners-up.

Upper round 1 | Upper round 2 | Upper final | Final
A1 | Dallas Empire | 3
B2 | OpTic Chicago | 3 | B2 | OpTic Chicago | 2
A3 | New York Subliners | 0 | A1 | Dallas Empire | 0
B1 | Atlanta FaZe | 3
B1 | Atlanta FaZe | 3
A2 | Los Angeles Thieves | 0 | B3 | Los Angeles Guerrillas | 0
B3 | Los Angeles Guerrillas | 3
B1 | Atlanta FaZe | 5
A1 | Dallas Empire | 2
Lower round 1 | Lower round 2 | Lower round 3 | Lower round 4 | Lower round 5 | Lower final
B3 | Los Angeles Guerrillas | 1
A3 | New York Subliners | 3 | A3 | New York Subliners | 3 | A1 | Dallas Empire | 3
B4 | Paris Legion | 1 | B6 | Florida Mutineers | 2 | A3 | New York Subliners | 3 | A3 | New York Subliners | 0
A5 | Seattle Surge | 1 | B6 | Florida Mutineers | 3 | B2 | OpTic Chicago | 0
B6 | Florida Mutineers | 3 | B2 | OpTic Chicago | 3
A2 | Los Angeles Thieves | 3 | A2 | Los Angeles Thieves | 1
A4 | Minnesota ROKKR | 2 | B5 | Toronto Ultra | 0
B5 | Toronto Ultra | 3 | B5 | Toronto Ultra | 3
A6 | London Royal Ravens | 2

== Stage 2 ==
Stage 2 group stages began on March 18, 2021, and ended on April 4. Starting with Stage 2, Crossroads Hardpoint and Garrison Search & Destroy were removed from the list of maps being played, with Apocalypse Hardpoint and Express Search & Destroy being added.

Group A

| Pos | Team | Overall Series | Overall Games | Qualification |
|---|---|---|---|---|
| 1 | Atlanta FaZe | 4–1 | 14–4 | Winners Round 2 Seed |
| 2 | New York Subliners | 4–1 | 13–8 | Winners Round 1 Seed |
| 3 | Toronto Ultra | 2–3 | 9–11 | Winners Round 1 Seed |
| 4 | London Royal Ravens | 2–3 | 7–10 | Losers Round 2 Seed |
| 5 | Los Angeles Guerrillas | 2–3 | 9–11 | Losers Round 1 Seed |
| 6 | Los Angeles Thieves | 1–4 | 6–14 | Losers Round 1 Seed |

Group B

| Pos | Team | Overall Series | Overall Games | Qualification |
|---|---|---|---|---|
| 1 | Minnesota ROKKR | 3–2 | 9–10 | Winners Round 2 Seed |
| 2 | OpTic Chicago | 3–2 | 9–9 | Winners Round 1 Seed |
| 3 | Dallas Empire | 3–2 | 13–9 | Winners Round 1 Seed |
| 4 | Seattle Surge | 2–3 | 10–10 | Losers Round 2 Seed |
| 5 | Paris Legion | 2–3 | 8–10 | Losers Round 1 Seed |
| 6 | Florida Mutineers | 2–3 | 8–9 | Losers Round 1 Seed |

=== Major ===
The Stage 2 Major ran from April 7 to April 11, 2021. Toronto Ultra won the Major, with the Atlanta FaZe as the runners-up.

Upper round 1 | Upper round 2 | Upper final | Final
A1 | Atlanta FaZe | 3
B2 | OpTic Chicago | 1 | A3 | Toronto Ultra | 1
A3 | Toronto Ultra | 3 | A1 | Atlanta FaZe | 3
B3 | Dallas Empire | 1
B1 | Minnesota ROKKR | 2
A2 | New York Subliners | 0 | B3 | Dallas Empire | 3
B3 | Dallas Empire | 3
A1 | Atlanta FaZe | 3
A3 | Toronto Ultra | 5
Lower round 1 | Lower round 2 | Lower round 3 | Lower round 4 | Lower round 5 | Lower final
B1 | Minnesota ROKKR | 3
B2 | OpTic Chicago | 3 | B2 | OpTic Chicago | 2 | B3 | Dallas Empire | 1
B4 | Seattle Surge | 3 | B4 | Seattle Surge | 1 | B1 | Minnesota ROKKR | 1 | A3 | Toronto Ultra | 3
A5 | Los Angeles Guerrillas | 0 | B6 | Florida Mutineers | 1 | A3 | Toronto Ultra | 3
B6 | Florida Mutineers | 3 | A3 | Toronto Ultra | 3
A2 | New York Subliners | 0 | A6 | Los Angeles Thieves | 0
A4 | London Royal Ravens | 2 | A6 | Los Angeles Thieves | 3
B5 | Paris Legion | 0 | A6 | Los Angeles Thieves | 3
A6 | Los Angeles Thieves | 3

== Stage 3 ==
Stage 3 group stages began on April 22, 2021, and ended on May 9. Matches were played on Thursday through Sunday.

Group A

| Pos | Team | Overall Series | Overall Games | Qualification |
|---|---|---|---|---|
| 1 | Toronto Ultra | 5–0 | 15–1 | Winners Round 2 Seed |
| 2 | Florida Mutineers | 3–2 | 10–9 | Winners Round 1 Seed |
| 3 | Dallas Empire | 3–2 | 9–10 | Winners Round 1 Seed |
| 4 | Minnesota ROKKR | 2–3 | 9–12 | Losers Round 2 Seed |
| 5 | Los Angeles Guerrillas | 1–4 | 9–12 | Losers Round 1 Seed |
| 6 | Paris Legion | 1–4 | 5–13 | Losers Round 1 Seed |

Group B

| Pos | Team | Overall Series | Overall Games | Qualification |
|---|---|---|---|---|
| 1 | New York Subliners | 4–1 | 14–7 | Winners Round 2 Seed |
| 2 | Atlanta FaZe | 4–1 | 14–8 | Winners Round 1 Seed |
| 3 | Los Angeles Thieves | 3–2 | 12–10 | Winners Round 1 Seed |
| 4 | OpTic Chicago | 2–3 | 8–10 | Losers Round 2 Seed |
| 5 | London Royal Ravens | 2–3 | 10–12 | Losers Round 1 Seed |
| 6 | Seattle Surge | 0–5 | 4–15 | Losers Round 1 Seed |

=== Major ===
The Stage 3 Major ran from May 13 until May 16, 2021. Atlanta FaZe won their second Major of the season, with the New York Subliners as the runners-up.

Upper round 1 | Upper round 2 | Upper final | Final
A1 | Toronto Ultra | 2
B2 | Atlanta FaZe | 3 | B2 | Atlanta FaZe | 3
A3 | Dallas Empire | 0 | B2 | Atlanta FaZe | 2
B1 | New York Subliners | 3
B1 | New York Subliners | 3
A2 | Florida Mutineers | 3 | A2 | Florida Mutineers | 0
B3 | Los Angeles Thieves | 1
B1 | New York Subliners | 2
B2 | Atlanta FaZe | 5
Lower round 1 | Lower round 2 | Lower round 3 | Lower round 4 | Lower round 5 | Lower final
A2 | Florida Mutineers | 0
A3 | Dallas Empire | 0 | B4 | OpTic Chicago | 3 | B2 | Atlanta FaZe | 3
B4 | OpTic Chicago | 3 | B4 | OpTic Chicago | 3 | B4 | OpTic Chicago | 2 | A1 | Toronto Ultra | 2
A5 | Los Angeles Guerrillas | 3 | A5 | Los Angeles Guerrillas | 1 | A1 | Toronto Ultra | 3
B6 | Seattle Surge | 1 | A1 | Toronto Ultra | 3
B3 | Los Angeles Thieves | 3 | B3 | Los Angeles Thieves | 1
A4 | Minnesota ROKKR | 0 | B5 | London Royal Ravens | 0
B5 | London Royal Ravens | 3 | B5 | London Royal Ravens | 3
A6 | Paris Legion | 1

== Stage 4 ==
Stage 4 group stages began on May 27, 2021, and ended on June 13. Matches were played on Thursday through Sunday. Starting with Stage 4, Checkmate Search & Destroy was removed from the list of maps being played, with Standoff Search & Destroy being added.

Group A

| Pos | Team | Overall Series | Overall Games | Qualification |
|---|---|---|---|---|
| 1 | Atlanta FaZe | 5–0 | 15–2 | Winners Round 2 Seed |
| 2 | OpTic Chicago | 3–2 | 11–8 | Winners Round 1 Seed |
| 3 | Minnesota ROKKR | 3–2 | 10–10 | Winners Round 1 Seed |
| 4 | Paris Legion | 2–3 | 9–11 | Losers Round 2 Seed |
| 5 | Los Angeles Thieves | 1–4 | 7–14 | Losers Round 1 Seed |
| 6 | Seattle Surge | 1–4 | 7–14 | Losers Round 1 Seed |

Group B

| Pos | Team | Overall Series | Overall Games | Qualification |
|---|---|---|---|---|
| 1 | Toronto Ultra | 4–1 | 14–3 | Winners Round 2 Seed |
| 2 | New York Subliners | 4–1 | 12–8 | Winners Round 1 Seed |
| 3 | Dallas Empire | 3–2 | 11–10 | Winners Round 1 Seed |
| 4 | Florida Mutineers | 3–2 | 13–9 | Losers Round 2 Seed |
| 5 | London Royal Ravens | 1–4 | 5–13 | Losers Round 1 Seed |
| 6 | Los Angeles Guerrillas | 0–5 | 3–15 | Losers Round 1 Seed |

=== Major ===
The Stage 4 Major ran from June 17 to June 20, 2021. For the first time since March 2020 the league moved back to playing on LAN. Atlanta FaZe won their third Major of the season, with the Dallas Empire as the runners-up.

Upper round 1 | Upper round 2 | Upper final | Final
A1 | Atlanta FaZe | 3
B2 | New York Subliners | 0 | A3 | Minnesota ROKKR | 0
A3 | Minnesota ROKKR | 3 | A1 | Atlanta FaZe | 3
B1 | Toronto Ultra | 1
B1 | Toronto Ultra | 3
A2 | OpTic Chicago | 0 | B3 | Dallas Empire | 2
B3 | Dallas Empire | 3
A1 | Atlanta FaZe | 5
B3 | Dallas Empire | 4
Lower round 1 | Lower round 2 | Lower round 3 | Lower round 4 | Lower round 5 | Lower final
B3 | Dallas Empire | 3
B2 | New York Subliners | 3 | B2 | New York Subliners | 1 | B1 | Toronto Ultra | 2
B4 | Florida Mutineers | 3 | B4 | Florida Mutineers | 2 | B3 | Dallas Empire | 3 | B3 | Dallas Empire | 3
A5 | Los Angeles Thieves | 2 | B6 | Los Angeles Guerrillas | 0 | A2 | OpTic Chicago | 1
B6 | Los Angeles Guerrillas | 3 | A3 | Minnesota ROKKR | 1
A2 | OpTic Chicago | 3 | A2 | OpTic Chicago | 3
A4 | Paris Legion | 0 | A6 | Seattle Surge | 2
B5 | London Royal Ravens | 1 | A6 | Seattle Surge | 3
A6 | Seattle Surge | 3

== Stage 5 ==
Stage 5 group stages began on July 8, 2021, and will end on July 25. Matches are played on Thursday through Sunday.

Group A

| Pos | Team | Overall Series | Overall Games | Qualification |
|---|---|---|---|---|
| 1 | OpTic Chicago | 4–1 | 14–5 | Winners Round 2 Seed |
| 2 | Atlanta FaZe | 4–1 | 14–4 | Winners Round 1 Seed |
| 3 | Los Angeles Thieves | 3–2 | 11–11 | Winners Round 1 Seed |
| 4 | London Royal Ravens | 2–3 | 7–13 | Losers Round 2 Seed |
| 5 | New York Subliners | 1–4 | 7–14 | Losers Round 1 Seed |
| 6 | Paris Legion | 1–4 | 7–13 | Losers Round 1 Seed |

Group B

| Pos | Team | Overall Series | Overall Games | Qualification |
|---|---|---|---|---|
| 1 | Dallas Empire | 4–1 | 13–5 | Winners Round 2 Seed |
| 2 | Toronto Ultra | 4–1 | 13–5 | Winners Round 1 Seed |
| 3 | Minnesota ROKKR | 3–2 | 11–7 | Winners Round 1 Seed |
| 4 | Florida Mutineers | 3–2 | 10–9 | Losers Round 2 Seed |
| 5 | Seattle Surge | 1–4 | 4–12 | Losers Round 1 Seed |
| 6 | Los Angeles Guerrillas | 0–5 | 2–15 | Losers Round 1 Seed |

=== Major ===
The Stage 5 Major ran from July 29 to August 1, 2021. Minnesota ROKKR won their first Major of the season after being down 0–4 in the finals with the Toronto Ultra as the runners-up.

Upper round 1 | Upper round 2 | Upper final | Final
A1 | OpTic Chicago | 2
B2 | Toronto Ultra | 3 | B2 | Toronto Ultra | 3
A3 | Los Angeles Thieves | 2 | B2 | Toronto Ultra | 0
B3 | Minnesota ROKKR | 3
B1 | Dallas Empire | 1
A2 | Atlanta FaZe | 1 | B3 | Minnesota ROKKR | 3
B3 | Minnesota ROKKR | 3
B3 | Minnesota ROKKR | 5
B2 | Toronto Ultra | 4
Lower round 1 | Lower round 2 | Lower round 3 | Lower round 4 | Lower round 5 | Lower final
B1 | Dallas Empire | 3
A3 | Los Angeles Thieves | 3 | A3 | Los Angeles Thieves | 1 | B2 | Toronto Ultra | 3
B4 | Florida Mutineers | 2 | A5 | New York Subliners | 1 | B1 | Dallas Empire | 1 | A1 | OpTic Chicago | 1
A5 | New York Subliners | 3 | A5 | New York Subliners | 3 | A1 | OpTic Chicago | 3
B6 | Los Angeles Guerrillas | 2 | A1 | OpTic Chicago | 3
A2 | Atlanta FaZe | 2 | B5 | Seattle Surge | 2
A4 | London Royal Ravens | 0 | B5 | Seattle Surge | 3
B5 | Seattle Surge | 3 | B5 | Seattle Surge | 3
A6 | Paris Legion | 1

== Championship ==
The 2021 Call of Duty League Championship began on August 19 and concluded on August 22, 2021. The top eight teams competed in the Championship, and all matches were played in Los Angeles.

=== Bracket ===
Upper round 1 | Upper round 2 | Upper final | Final
1 | Atlanta FaZe | 3
4 | OpTic Chicago | 2 | 5 | New York Subliners | 0
5 | New York Subliners | 3 | 1 | Atlanta FaZe | 3
3 | Dallas Empire | 0
2 | Toronto Ultra | 2
3 | Dallas Empire | 3 | 3 | Dallas Empire | 3
6 | Minnesota ROKKR | 0
1 | Atlanta FaZe | 5
2 | Toronto Ultra | 3
Lower round 1 | Lower round 2 | Lower round 3 | Lower final
2 | Toronto Ultra | 3
8 | Florida Mutineers | 1 | 4 | OpTic Chicago | 1 | 3 | Dallas Empire | 2
4 | OpTic Chicago | 3 | 2 | Toronto Ultra | 3 | 2 | Toronto Ultra | 3
6 | Minnesota ROKKR | 2
5 | New York Subliners | 1
7 | Los Angeles Thieves | 2 | 6 | Minnesota ROKKR | 3
6 | Minnesota ROKKR | 3

=== Grand finals ===
| Grand Finals | August 22 | Atlanta FaZe | 5 | – | 3 | Toronto Ultra | Los Angeles |
| | 3:00 pm EDT (19:00 UTC) | Details | | | | | |
| | | 175 | Moscow - Hardpoint | | | 250 | |
| | | 6 | Express - Search & Destroy | | | 5 | |
| | | 3 | Raid - Control | | | 0 | |
| | | 250 | Raid - Hardpoint | | | 78 | |
| | | 2 | Miami - Search & Destroy | | | 6 | |
| | | 3 | Garrison - Control | | | 2 | |
| | | 5 | Raid - Search & Destroy | | | 6 | |
| | | 250 | Apocalypse - Hardpoint | | | 147 | |
