= G2 Minnesota =

American professional Call of Duty League (CDL) esports team

- Founded: July 1, 2019
- League: Call of Duty League
- Team history: Minnesota RØKKR (2019–2025); G2 Minnesota (2025–present)
- Based in: Minneapolis, Minnesota, U.S.
- Colors
- Stage titles: 1 (2021 Major 5)
- Parent group: G2 Esports
- Website: Official website

G2 Minnesota (formerly known as Minnesota RØKKR) is an American professional Call of Duty League (CDL) esports team based in Minneapolis, Minnesota. The team is owned by G2 Esports, a European esports organization, who merged with Version1 (Owned by WISE Ventures, a private investments fund owned by the Wilf family, the owners of the Minnesota Vikings, along with Gary Vaynerchuk), in December 2023.

== History ==
On July 1, 2019, Minnesota was announced as one of the twelve cities owning a spot in the CDL. On October 29, 2019, Minnesota announced their branding as Minnesota ROKKR; Brett Diamond, COO of WISE Ventures, explained they were going for a Norse mythology theme. In Old Norse dialect, røkkr translates to twilight, and can also be linked to Ragnarök.

During the 2020 Call of Duty League season the team failed to win any Home Series, resulting in an 8th finish in the Regular Season standings. At the Champions Weekend the team finished 9th/10th following a loss to the New York Subliners in the Winners Bracket round 1, followed by a loss against OpTic Gaming Los Angeles in the Losers Bracket round 2.

In September 2020 the Minnesota RØKKR were joined by Priestahh, MajorManiak, Attach and Accuracy.

On August 1, 2021, Minnesota RØKKR won their first Major in franchise history after being down 0–4 against Toronto Ultra during the Stage 5 major finals.

In September 2021 the Minnesota RØKKR revealed that Priestahh, MajorManiak, Attach and Standy would return as the roster for the 2022 CDL season.

On August 25, 2022, Minnesota RØKKR announced Bance, Afro, Attach and Cammy as their starting roster going into the 2023 CDL season.

On December 5, 2023, it was announced that G2 Esports, a European esports organization who last fielded a Call of Duty team during the Black Ops 4 season, had merged with Version1, which was also owned by WISE Ventures, with G2 acquiring operating rights to the Minnesota RØKKR in the process; as a result of this, Version1 would not field any teams in any esport for the foreseeable future. Accuracy, Lynz, Owakening and Vivid would make up the 2024 roster for the Minnesota RØKKR.

== Current roster ==
G2 Minnesota roster
Players
Coaches

| Handle | Name | Nationality |
|---|---|---|
| Abe | Abraham, Ronald | United States |
| Prolute | Vera, Byron | United States |
| Spart | Cervantez, Kris | United States |
| TJHaLy | Haly, Thomas | United States |

Head coach

Daniel "Loony" Loza

Assistant coach(es)

Alexander "alexdotzip" Purpora

Legend:
- (I) Inactive
- (S) Suspended
- Substitute
- (injured) Injury / Illness

Latest roster transaction: November 2, 2026.

== Awards and records ==
=== Seasons overview ===
| Season | Regular season | | | | | | | Finish | Playoffs | Note |
| Season | P | MW | ML | MW% | GW | GL | GW% | Finish | Playoffs | Note |
|---|---|---|---|---|---|---|---|---|---|---|
| 2020 | 28 | 12 | 16 | .429 | 50 | 62 | .446 | 8th | 9–10th, Lost in Losers round 2, 0–3 (OGLA) | As Minnesota RØKKR |
| 2021 | 36 | 19 | 17 | .528 | 72 | 73 | .497 | 6th | 4th, Lost in Losers round 3, 2–3 (Ultra) | As Minnesota RØKKR |
| 2022 | 28 | 14 | 14 | .500 | 57 | 58 | .496 | 11th | Did not qualify | As Minnesota RØKKR |
| 2023 | 42 | 19 | 23 | .452 | 76 | 86 | .469 | 6th | 7–8th, Lost in Losers round 1, 1–3 (Breach) | As Minnesota RØKKR |
| 2024 | 36 | 11 | 25 | .306 | 56 | 90 | .384 | 11th | Did not qualify | As Minnesota RØKKR |
| 2025 | 39 | 15 | 24 | .385 | 72 | 93 | .436 | 9th | Did not qualify | As Minnesota RØKKR |
| 2026 | 47 | 21 | 26 | .447 | 89 | 94 | .486 | 6th | 5–6th, Lost in Losers round 2, 0–3 (Gentle Mates) | As G2 Minnesota |

=== Tournament wins ===
| Date | Prize | Event | Roster |
|---|---|---|---|
| 2021-08-01 | $ 200,000 | Call of Duty League 2021 – Stage 5 Major | Attach • Priestahh • MajorManiak • Standy • Saintt (coach) |

=== Individual accomplishments ===
2nd Team All-Star

- Attach (Dillon Price) – 2022
