= 2022 Call of Duty League season =

- League: Call of Duty League
- Sport: Call of Duty: Vanguard
- Duration: January 21 – August 7, 2022
- Teams: 12
- Season MVP: McArthur "Cellium" Jovel

Stage Champions
- Stage 1: OpTic Texas
- Stage 2: Los Angeles Guerrillas
- Pro-Am Classic: New York Subliners
- Stage 3: Seattle Surge
- Stage 4: Los Angeles Thieves

Grand Finals
- Champions: Los Angeles Thieves
- Runners-up: Atlanta FaZe
- Finals MVP: Kenneth "Kenny" Williams

Seasons
- ← 2021 2023 →

The 2022 Call of Duty League season was the third season for the Call of Duty League, an esports league based on the video game franchise Call of Duty.

== League format and changes ==
=== Teams ===
Before the start of the 2022 season, Envy Gaming announced that it would be merging with OpTic Gaming, resulting in the Dallas Empire being renamed to OpTic Texas. As a result of the merger, the Chicago franchise spot became vacant, with the vacant spot being taken by a new franchise based in Boston, named the Boston Breach.

Team	Location	Joined	Owner
Atlanta FaZe	(United States) Atlanta, GA	2020	Atlanta Esports Ventures, FaZe Clan
Boston Breach	(United States) Boston, MA	2022	Kraft Sports Group
Florida Mutineers	(United States) Orlando, FL	2020	Misfits Gaming
London Royal Ravens	(United Kingdom) London, UK	2020	ReKTGlobal, Inc.
Los Angeles Guerrillas	(United States) Los Angeles, CA	2020	Kroenke Sports & Entertainment
Los Angeles Thieves	(United States) Los Angeles, CA	2021	100 Thieves
Minnesota ROKKR	(United States) Minneapolis, MN	2020	WISE Ventures
New York Subliners	(United States) New York City, NY	2020	NYXL
OpTic Texas	(United States) Dallas, TX	2020	OpTic Gaming
Paris Legion	Paris, France	2020	c0ntact Gaming
Seattle Surge	(United States) Seattle, WA	2020	Canucks Sports & Entertainment, Enthusiast Gaming
Toronto Ultra	(Canada) Toronto, ON	2020	OverActive Media

=== Broadcasting ===
On January 21, the League announced that Esports Engine will become their official broadcasting partner for the 2022 season.

Shoutcasters Clint "Maven" Evans and Joe "Merk" DeLuca returned, although they were not given offers to return until just before the beginning of the season. In an interview with Dot Esports, general manager Daniel Tsay claimed that contract negotiations prevented from addressing their absence and stated that the pair will only call the Majors, playoffs, and Champs weekend.

Lottie Van-Praag and Jess Brohard both departed and were replaced by Loviel "Velly" Cardwell and Guy "Blaze" Spencer as desk host stage host, respectively. Alyssa "Allycxt" Parker was added as desk analyst, alongside a returning Anthony "NAMELESS" Wheeler.

== Kickoff Classic ==
The Kickoff classis ran from January 21 to January 23, 2022. The tournament was won by Toronto Ultra, with Seattle Surge coming in second.

The 2022 Kickoff Classic saw less viewership compared to its previous seasons, peaking at just under 80,000 concurrent viewers, compared to a 107,000 peak viewership from 2021.

Round 1
Seattle Surge	3
London Royal Ravens	0
New York Subliners	3
Boston Breach	2
Los Angeles Thieves	3
Paris Legion	1
Florida Mutineers	3
Los Angeles Guerrillas	1

Quarterfinals
Atlanta FaZe	1
Seattle Surge	3
Minnesota ROKKR	0
New York Subliners	3
OpTic Texas	1
Los Angeles Thieves	3
Toronto Ultra	3
Florida Mutineers	1

Semifinals
Seattle Surge	3
New York Subliners	1
Los Angeles Thieves	2
Toronto Ultra	3

Finals
Seattle Surge	1
Toronto Ultra	3

== Regular season ==
=== Format ===
For the 2022 season, teams will play at four Majors on a hybrid online/LAN model. Each Major will take place over the course of 4 weeks, with each team playing online qualifying matches during the first three weeks against five random teams. After these three weeks the standings will be used to seed the teams for the major, with the bottom 4 teams starting in the Elimination Bracket.

In the middle of the season professional and amateur players will play against each other in a Pro-am tournament, and a Call of Duty: Warzone tournament featuring Call of Duty League pro players, streamers, and other influencers will be organized as well.

=== Schedule ===
To start the season, all twelve teams played against each other on January 21 through January 23, 2022, at the Esports Stadium Arlington in Arlington, Texas. Two weeks later, on February 4 through February 6, the 2022 season officially started with the first matches being played online. The online qualifiers for Major I ended on February 20, with the Major being hosted by OpTic Texas on March 3 through March 6. Major II online qualifiers took place from March 11 through March 27, with the Major taking place from March 31 through April 3, hosted by Minnesota ROKKR.

Before the start of Major III, the midseason events will place with an online all-star weekend on April 9 and April 10. Two weeks later on April 24, the CDL Warzone Pacific tournament took place which saw four players from all twelve teams fighting until the last man standing. From May 5 through May 8, the Pro-Am Classic took place, which saw the twelve CDL teams being joined by the four best Challengers teams in a tournament with the winning team taking home $100,000.

After the midseason events concluded, Major III was hosted by Toronto Ultra from June 2 through June 5, with the online qualifiers taking place from May 13 through May 29. The final Major of the season was hosted by New York Subliners, with the online qualifiers taking place from July 1 through July 17 and the Major itself taking place on July 21 through July 24.

The season concluded with the 2022 Call of Duty Championship, from August 4 through August 7, at the Galen Center in Los Angeles, California.

== Standings ==
2022 Call of Duty League standings
#	Team	Pts	EP	MW	ML	M%	GW	GL	G%
1	Atlanta FaZe	330	4	28	13	.683	102	70	.593
2	OpTic Texas	265	4	24	12	.667	90	55	.621
3	Los Angeles Thieves	200	4	17	17	.500	71	66	.518
4	London Royal Ravens	190	4	17	14	.548	63	62	.504
5	Seattle Surge	185	4	15	15	.500	65	62	.512
6	Boston Breach	180	4	16	16	.500	63	68	.481
7	Toronto Ultra	180	4	16	18	.471	70	72	.493
8	New York Subliners	160	4	14	14	.500	56	56	.500
9	Florida Mutineers	160	4	13	18	.419	54	67	.446
10	Los Angeles Guerrillas	155	4	15	17	.469	59	72	.450
11	Minnesota ROKKR	140	4	14	14	.500	57	58	.496
12	Paris Legion	20	4	2	23	.080	31	73	.298

As of 17 July 2022

== Stage 1 ==
Stage 1 group stage began on February 4, 2022, and ended on February 20.

=== Group stage ===
Pos	Team	Overall Series	Overall Games	Qualification
1	Atlanta FaZe	5–0	15–5	Winners Round 1 Seed
2	London Royal Ravens	4–1	13–7	Winners Round 1 Seed
3	Los Angeles Thieves	4–1	13–8	Winners Round 1 Seed
4	OpTic Texas	3–2	13–7	Winners Round 1 Seed
5	Seattle Surge	3–2	10–10	Winners Round 1 Seed
6	Toronto Ultra	2–3	9–9	Winners Round 1 Seed
7	Los Angeles Guerrillas	2–3	10–11	Winners Round 1 Seed
8	Boston Breach	2–3	10–12	Winners Round 1 Seed
9	Florida Mutineers	2–3	8–10	Losers Round 1 Seed
10	Minnesota ROKKR	2–3	9–13	Losers Round 1 Seed
11	New York Subliners	1–4	6–14	Losers Round 1 Seed
12	Paris Legion	0–5	5–15	Losers Round 1 Seed

=== Major ===
The Stage 1 Major ran from March 3 through March 6, 2022. The Major was won by OpTic Texas after defeating Atlanta FaZe 5–2 in the finals.

Upper round 1	Upper round 2	Upper final	Final
1	Atlanta FaZe	3
8	Boston Breach	0
1	Atlanta FaZe	2
4	OpTic Texas	3
4	OpTic Texas	3
5	Seattle Surge	0
4	OpTic Texas	3
2	London Royal Ravens	1
2	London Royal Ravens	3
7	Los Angeles Guerrillas	2
2	London Royal Ravens	3
6	Toronto Ultra	1
3	Los Angeles Thieves	2
6	Toronto Ultra	3
4	OpTic Texas	5
1	Atlanta FaZe	2
Lower round 1	Lower round 2	Lower round 3	Lower round 4	Lower final
8	Boston Breach	3
6	Toronto Ultra	3
9	Florida Mutineers	2
8	Boston Breach	3	8	Boston Breach	2
12	Paris Legion	1	2	London Royal Ravens	1
5	Seattle Surge	2
6	Toronto Ultra	0	1	Atlanta FaZe	3
12	Paris Legion	3
1	Atlanta FaZe	3
7	Los Angeles Guerrillas	0
1	Atlanta FaZe	3
10	Minnesota ROKKR	3
10	Minnesota ROKKR	1	3	Los Angeles Thieves	2
3	Los Angeles Thieves	3
3	Los Angeles Thieves	3
11	New York Subliners	0

== Stage 2 ==
Stage 2 group stage began on March 11, 2022, and ended on March 27.

=== Group stage ===
Pos	Team	Overall Series	Overall Games	Qualification
1	OpTic Texas	5–0	15–3	Winners Round 1 Seed
2	London Royal Ravens	4–1	13–7	Winners Round 1 Seed
3	Boston Breach	4–1	13–6	Winners Round 1 Seed
4	New York Subliners	3–2	10–9	Winners Round 1 Seed
5	Atlanta FaZe	3–2	11–10	Winners Round 1 Seed
6	Los Angeles Guerrillas	3–2	9–9	Winners Round 1 Seed
7	Florida Mutineers	2–3	7–9	Winners Round 1 Seed
8	Seattle Surge	2–3	9–12	Winners Round 1 Seed
9	Minnesota ROKKR	2–3	8–13	Losers Round 1 Seed
10	Paris Legion	1–4	8–14	Losers Round 1 Seed
11	Toronto Ultra	1–4	10–13	Losers Round 1 Seed
12	Los Angeles Thieves	0–5	7–15	Losers Round 1 Seed

=== Major ===
The Stage 2 Major took place from March 31 through April 3, 2022, and was won by Los Angeles Guerrillas with Atlanta FaZe once again coming in second.

Upper round 2	Upper round 3	Upper final	Final
1	OpTic Texas	0
8	Seattle Surge	3
8	Seattle Surge	2
5	Atlanta FaZe	3
4	New York Subliners	0
5	Atlanta FaZe	3
5	Atlanta FaZe	3
3	Boston Breach	0
2	London Royal Ravens	0
7	Florida Mutineers	3
7	Florida Mutineers	2
3	Boston Breach	3
3	Boston Breach	3
6	Los Angeles Guerrillas	0
5	Atlanta FaZe	2
6	Los Angeles Guerrillas	5
Lower round 1	Lower round 2	Lower round 3	Lower round 4	Lower final
1	OpTic Texas	3
7	Florida Mutineers	3
9	Minnesota ROKKR	1
1	OpTic Texas	3	1	OpTic Texas	1
12	Los Angeles Thieves	2	3	Boston Breach	2
4	New York Subliners	2
7	Florida Mutineers	2	6	Los Angeles Guerrillas	3
12	Los Angeles Thieves	3
6	Los Angeles Guerrillas	3
2	London Royal Ravens	3
8	Seattle Surge	2
10	Paris Legion	1
2	London Royal Ravens	0	6	Los Angeles Guerrillas	3
6	Los Angeles Guerrillas	3
6	Los Angeles Guerrillas	3
11	Toronto Ultra	1

== Pro-Am Classic ==
From May 5 through May 8, 2022, all twelve Call of Duty League teams alongside four Challengers teams competed against each other. The teams were put into 4 groups of 4, with three CDL teams and one Challengers team in each group. Teams played the other three teams in their group once, with the top 2 from each group advancing to a single elimination bracket. The tournament was won by the New York Subliners, with the Los Angeles Thieves coming in second.

Group A

Pos	Team	Overall Series	Overall Games	Qualification
1	Atlanta FaZe	3–0	9–2	Winners Round 1
2	Toronto Ultra	2–1	7–4	Winners Round 1
3	Strike X	1–2	4–7	
4	Seattle Surge	0–3	2–9	

Group B

Pos	Team	Overall Series	Overall Games	Qualification
1	Florida Mutineers	3–0	9–2	Winners Round 1
2	OpTic Texas	2–1	6–5	Winners Round 1
3	Minnesota ROKKR	1–2	5–6	
4	Ultra Academy EU	0–3	2–9	

Group C

Pos	Team	Overall Series	Overall Games	Qualification
1	New York Subliners	3–0	9–1	Winners Round 1
2	Los Angeles Thieves	2–1	6–4	Winners Round 1
3	London Royal Ravens	1–2	4–7	
4	Team War	0–3	2–9	

Group D

Pos	Team	Overall Series	Overall Games	Qualification
1	Boston Breach	2–1	8–4	Winners Round 1
2	Paris Legion	2–1	7–6	Winners Round 1
3	Ultra Academy NA	2–1	7–7	
4	Los Angeles Guerrillas	0–3	4–9	

=== Bracket ===
Quarterfinals
Atlanta FaZe	2
OpTic Texas	3
Boston Breach	1
Los Angeles Thieves	3
Florida Mutineers	1
Toronto Ultra	3
New York Subliners	3
Paris Legion	0

Semifinals
OpTic Texas	1
Los Angeles Thieves	3
Toronto Ultra	1
New York Subliners	3

Finals
Los Angeles Thieves	1
New York Subliners	3

== Stage 3 ==
Stage 3 group stage began on May 13, 2022, and ended on May 29. As part of Stage 3, the Call of Duty League introduced Bounty Week. From May 20 through May 22 all twelve teams played single series with $10,000 on the line for during series.

=== Group stage ===
Pos	Team	Overall Series	Overall Games	Qualification
1	Minnesota ROKKR	5–0	15–3	Winners Round 1 Seed
2	OpTic Texas	4–1	14–4	Winners Round 1 Seed
3	Seattle Surge	4–1	14–5	Winners Round 1 Seed
4	Toronto Ultra	4–1	14–8	Winners Round 1 Seed
5	Atlanta FaZe	3–2	10–8	Winners Round 1 Seed
6	New York Subliners	3–2	12–8	Winners Round 1 Seed
7	Florida Mutineers	2–3	8–12	Winners Round 1 Seed
8	Los Angeles Thieves	2–3	6–9	Winners Round 1 Seed
9	Boston Breach	1–4	6–13	Losers Round 1 Seed
10	Los Angeles Guerrillas	1–4	5–14	Losers Round 1 Seed
11	London Royal Ravens	1–4	5–14	Losers Round 1 Seed
12	Paris Legion	0–5	5–15	Losers Round 1 Seed

=== Major ===
The Stage 3 Major took place from June 2 through June 5, 2022. The major was won by Seattle Surge, with Atlanta FaZe coming in second.

Upper round 1	Upper round 2	Upper final	Final
1	Minnesota ROKKR	2
8	Los Angeles Thieves	3
8	Los Angeles Thieves	0
5	Atlanta FaZe	3
4	Toronto Ultra	1
5	Atlanta FaZe	3
5	Atlanta FaZe	2
3	Seattle Surge	3
2	OpTic Texas	2
7	Florida Mutineers	3
7	Florida Mutineers	1
3	Seattle Surge	3
3	Seattle Surge	3
6	New York Subliners	2
3	Seattle Surge	5
5	Atlanta Faze	3
Lower round 1	Lower round 2	Lower round 3	Lower round 4	Lower final
1	Minnesota ROKKR	3
7	Florida Mutineers	0
9	Boston Breach	0
1	Minnesota ROKKR	0	4	Toronto Ultra	3
4	Toronto Ultra	3	5	Atlanta FaZe	3
4	Toronto Ultra	3
4	Toronto Ultra	3	4	Toronto Ultra	2
12	Paris Legion	1
8	Los Angeles Thieves	1
2	OpTic Texas	3
8	Los Angeles Thieves	3
10	Los Angeles Guerrillas	0
2	OpTic Texas	3	2	OpTic Texas	1
11	London Royal Ravens	0
6	New York Subliners	1
11	London Royal Ravens	3

== Stage 4 ==
Stage 4 group stage began on June 24, 2022, and ended on July 10.

=== Group stage ===
Pos	Team	Overall Series	Overall Games	Qualification
1	London Royal Ravens	4–1	14–7	Winners Round 1 Seed
2	New York Subliners	4–1	14–7	Winners Round 1 Seed
3	Boston Breach	4–1	12–9	Winners Round 1 Seed
4	Los Angeles Thieves	3–2	13–8	Winners Round 1 Seed
5	Atlanta FaZe	3–2	11–8	Winners Round 1 Seed
6	Florida Mutineers	3–2	11–10	Winners Round 1 Seed
7	Minnesota ROKKR	3–2	10–11	Winners Round 1 Seed
8	Toronto Ultra	2–3	9–13	Winners Round 1 Seed
9	Los Angeles Guerrillas	2–3	10–12	Losers Round 1 Seed
10	OpTic Texas	1–4	9–13	Losers Round 1 Seed
11	Seattle Surge	1–4	7–12	Losers Round 1 Seed
12	Paris Legion	0–5	5–15	Losers Round 1 Seed

=== Major ===
The Stage 4 Major took place from July 14 through July 17, 2022. It was won by Los Angeles Thieves, with New York Subliners coming in second.

Upper round 1	Upper round 2	Upper final	Final
1	London Royal Ravens	2
8	Toronto Ultra	3
8	Toronto Ultra	0
4	Los Angeles Thieves	3
4	Los Angeles Thieves	3
5	Atlanta FaZe	1
4	Los Angeles Thieves	1
2	New York Subliners	3
2	New York Subliners	3
7	Minnesota ROKKR	2
2	New York Subliners	3
6	Florida Mutineers	0
3	Boston Breach	2
6	Florida Mutineers	3
2	New York Subliners	3
4	Los Angeles Thieves	5
Lower round 1	Lower round 2	Lower round 3	Lower round 4	Lower final
1	London Royal Ravens	2
6	Florida Mutineers	1
9	Los Angeles Guerrillas	3
9	Los Angeles Guerrillas	0	5	Atlanta FaZe	3
5	Atlanta FaZe	3	4	Los Angeles Thieves	3
5	Atlanta FaZe	3
5	Atlanta FaZe	3	5	Atlanta FaZe	1
12	Paris Legion	2
10	OpTic Texas	1
7	Minnesota ROKKR	2
8	Toronto Ultra	2
10	OpTic Texas	3
10	OpTic Texas	3	10	OpTic Texas	3
3	Boston Breach	1
3	Boston Breach	3
11	Seattle Surge	2

== Championship ==
The 2022 Call of Duty League Championship took place from August 4 through August 7, 2022. The top eight teams from the regular seasons standings competed in a Double Elimination bracket.

=== Bracket ===
Winners Round 1	Winners Round 2	Winners Final	Final
1	Atlanta FaZe	3
8	New York Subliners	2
1	Atlanta FaZe	3
5	Seattle Surge	2
4	London Royal Ravens	2
5	Seattle Surge	3
1	Atlanta FaZe	1
3	Los Angeles Thieves	3
2	OpTic Texas	3
7	Toronto Ultra	2
2	OpTic Texas	0
3	Los Angeles Thieves	3
3	Los Angeles Thieves	3
6	Boston Breach	2	3	Los Angeles Thieves	5
1	Atlanta FaZe	2
Elimination Round 1	Elimination Round 2	Elimination Round 3	Elimination Final
2	OpTic Texas	3
8	New York Subliners	3	8	New York Subliners	0	1	Atlanta FaZe	3
4	London Royal Ravens	2	2	OpTic Texas	1	5	Seattle Surge	1
5	Seattle Surge	3
5	Seattle Surge	3
7	Toronto Ultra	3	7	Toronto Ultra	1
6	Boston Breach	1

=== Grand finals ===
Grand Finals	August 7	Los Angeles Thieves	5	–	2	Atlanta FaZe
	12:00 noon PDT (19:00 UTC)					
		250	Gavutu - Hardpoint			187
		6	Berlin - Search & Destroy			2
		3	Gavutu - Control			2
		250	Tuscan - Hardpoint			212
		1	Bocage - Search & Destroy			6
		2	Berlin - Control			3
		6	Tuscan - Search & Destroy			5
