= Cloud9 New York =

New York City-based esports team

- Founded: May 2, 2019
- League: Call of Duty League
- Team history: New York Subliners (2019–2024); Cloud9 New York (2024–present)
- Based in: New York City, U.S.
- Colors
- Championships: 1 (2023) (New York Subliners)
- Stage titles: 3 (2023 Major 1 & 5) (2024 Major 4)
- Parent group: Cloud9
- Website: Official website

Cloud9 New York is an American professional Call of Duty League (CDL) esports team based in New York City. The team is operated by Cloud9, an esports organization owned by Jack Etienne. The team were formerly known as the New York Subliners (NYSL), owned by Sterling Equities subsidiary Sterling.VC. New York was announced as one of the first five cities to own a spot in the CDL.

== History ==
=== Call of Duty: Modern Warfare ===
NYSL entered the CDL with high expectations due to their veteran filled lineup led by ZooMaa. These expectations were halted quickly, with the team suffering frequent losses at the Launch Weekend event. The underperforming continued into the following events for the Subliners, ultimately leading to the team's first roster change; in which they acquired "Mack".

This new addition of Mack also brought along a new energy to the team. The NYSL defeated fan-favorite Chicago Huntsmen during week 6, winning in a unanimous 3–0 fashion. The team went on to finish 5th in the league overall.

The Subliners faced obstacles early with team composition. This came in January 2021 when Tommy 'ZooMaa' Paparatto, veteran Call of Duty professional and league starter announced his retirement. The team responded with the addition of amateur player, Conor 'Diamondcon' Johst to fill this position.

=== Call of Duty: Vanguard ===
The Call of Duty team of NYSL had been struggling for a while before they picked up a player named KiSMET, who had been making waves in the competitive scene for his exceptional skills. KiSMET's addition to the team was a game-changer, and he immediately showed his worth in the Respawn game mode.

With KiSMET on board, NYSL was able to make a strong comeback in the 2022 Vanguard Pro Am Classic, which was KiSMET's first event back in the CDL after Modern Warfare. KiSMET's contributions were crucial in their victory, and NYSL emerged as the champions of the 2022 Vanguard Pro Am Classic.

On March 20, 2022, Clayster announced he was benched from NYSL in favor of PaulEhx.

From July 14, 2022, to Sunday, July 17, 2022, the NYSL parent organization NYXL (company) hosted the Call of Duty League Major IV at Kings Theatre (Brooklyn). After the major, NYSL had secured a spot to the Call of Duty Champs 2022.

The NYSL tied for 5 & 6 place against Toronto Ultra at the 2022 Call of Duty League Championships.

The NYSL continued to have obstacles in team composition throughout the 2022 season. After the championships, NYSL players Crimsix, PaulEhx, HyDra, and coach Dreal, participated on a podcast called 'The Flank', in which the players discussed racism between players, knowledge of NYXL's internal plans for their replacement since before Major 4, and favoritism from coaches and management.

Crimsix, renowned professional player with the most wins in Call of Duty history, retired after the 2022 season with NYSL.

=== Call of Duty: Modern Warfare 2 ===
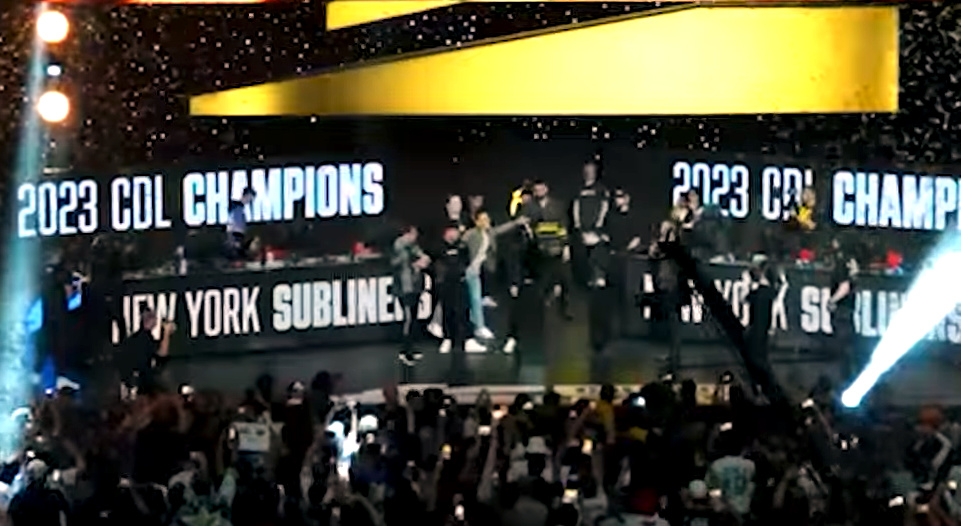
NYSL won the 2023 Call of Duty League championship.

After the departure of Crimsix, the New York Subliners built their roster for the 2023 Call of Duty Modern Warfare 2 season around Hydra, making two significant additions in the form of players Priestahh and Skyz.

At the first tournament of the season, Major 1 hosted by the league in Raleigh, North Carolina, NYSL won the top seat.

On December 19, 2022, NYXL announced that they would no longer be hosting Major IV for 2023.

The NYSL won the 2023 Call of Duty League Championships. KiSMET was awarded MVP of the event for his performance.

=== Call of Duty: Modern Warfare 3 ===
After winning the MW2 championship, The New York Subliners dropped Priestahh and added Sib to their professional lineup for the MW3 Season. During the

At the fourth tournament of the season, Major 4 hosted by the league in Burbank, California, NYSL won the top seat.

NYSL lost the 2024 Call of Duty League Championship, losing to OpTic Texas in the Grand Final.

=== Call of Duty: Black Ops 6 ===
During the middle of last season, the franchise spot was sold to Cloud9 and the team was later rebranded as "Cloud9 New York". The team started the offseason by parting ways with their entire roster and coaching staff, barring Sib. In October 2024, Cloud9 New York built their roster around Sib with additions of Attach, Kremp, and Mack with Accuracy as the new head coach.

== New York Subliners Academy ==
On January 25, 2024, NYSL announced that they would be creating a semi-professional team (Tier 2) for Call of Duty Challengers Cup, featuring players Gunless, Classic, PaulEhx, and Decemate.

Four months later, the whole team was let go on May 7, 2024, only ten days before they were set to appear at the Call of Duty Major 3 hosted by Toronto Ultra.

== Current roster ==
Cloud9 New York roster
Players
Coaches

Handle	Name	Nationality
Cammy	McKilligan, Cameron	Scotland
Insight	Craven, Jamie	England
Lurqxx	Brown, Logan	United States
Pred	Zulbeari, Amer	Australia
Wevy (Note: Wevy is currently loaned out to Vancouver Surge) (I)	Medina, Jason	United States

Head coach

Arian "Arian" Chitsaz

Assistant coach(es)

Lamar "Accuracy" Abedi
Michael "MajorManiak" Syzmaniak

Legend:
- (I) Inactive
- (S) Suspended
- Substitute
- (injured) Injury / Illness

Latest roster transaction: October 22, 2026.

== Awards and records ==
=== Seasons overview ===
Season	Regular season							Finish	Playoffs	Note
Season	P	MW	ML	MW%	GW	GL	GW%	Finish	Playoffs	Note
2020	30	13	17	.433	57	60	.487	5th	7–8th, Lost in Losers round 2, 2–3 (London)	As New York Subliners
2021	41	24	17	.528	85	81	.512	5th	5–6th, Lost in Losers round 2, 1–3 (Rokkr)	As New York Subliners
2022	29	14	15	.483	59	61	.492	8th	5–6th, Lost in Losers round 2, 0–3 (OpTic)	As New York Subliners
2023	48	31	17	.646	112	77	.593	3rd	1st, Won Grand Finals, 5–0 (Ultra)	As New York Subliners
2024	46	30	16	.652	108	76	.587	4th	2nd, Lost in Grand Finals, 1–5 (OpTic)	As New York Subliners
2025	36	12	24	.333	57	80	.416	10th	Did not qualify	As Cloud9 New York
2026	35	4	31	.114	38	97	.281	12th	Did not qualify	As Cloud9 New York

=== Tournament wins ===
==== Major ====
Date	Prize	Event	Roster
2020-07-12	$50,000	Call of Duty League 2020 Week 11 – New York	ZooMaa • Temp • Accuracy • Attach • Mack • Revan (coach)
2022-12-18	$200,000	Call of Duty League 2023 – Major 1	HyDra • KiSMET • Skyz • Priestahh • DREAL (coach) • Sender (coach)
2023-05-28	$200,000	Call of Duty League 2023 – Major 5	HyDra • KiSMET • Skyz • Priestahh • DREAL (coach) • Sender (coach)
2023-06-18	$1,000,000	Call of Duty League Championship 2023	HyDra • KiSMET • Skyz • Priestahh • DREAL (coach) • Sender (coach)
2024-06-30	$150,000	Call of Duty League 2024 – Major 4	HyDra • KiSMET • Skyz • Sib • DREAL (coach) • Sender (coach)

==== Other CDL Events ====
Date	Prize	Event	Roster
2022-05-08	$100,000	Call of Duty League 2022 – Pro-Am Classic	HyDra • Crimsix • PaulEhx • KiSMET • DREAL (coach) • Revan (coach)

=== Individual accomplishments ===
Season MVP

- Hydra (Paco Rusiewiez) – 2023

Champs MVP

- KiSMET (Matthew Tinsley) – 2023

1st Team All-Star

- Hydra (Paco Rusiewiez) – 2023, 2024

2nd Team All-Star

- Hydra (Paco Rusiewiez) – 2022
