= Paris Gentle Mates =

Professional French Call of Duty League esports team

- Founded: August 20, 2019
- League: Call of Duty League
- Team history: Los Angeles Guerrillas (2019–2024); Los Angeles Guerrillas M8 (2024–2025); Paris Gentle Mates (2025–present)
- Based in: Paris, France
- Colors
- Stage titles: 2 (2022 Major 2) (2026 Major 1)
- Parent group: Gentle Mates
- Website: Official website

The Paris Gentle Mates (formerly known as Los Angeles Guerrillas and Los Angeles Guerrillas M8) are a French professional Call of Duty League (CDL) esports team based in Paris. Paris Gentle Mates is owned by French esports organization Gentle Mates. The Guerrillas were formerly owned by Kroenke Sports & Entertainment from its founding in 2019 to 2024.

== History ==
On August 20, 2019, Activision Blizzard announced that Kroenke Sports & Entertainment had purchased one of the two new franchise slots for the Call of Duty League. According to ESPN, the publisher was looking to sell slots for approximately $25 million per team. On October 18, 2019, branding was revealed as the Los Angeles Guerrillas. The Guerrillas won their first major in franchise history during Major Two of the 2022 Call of Duty League.

In December 2024, the franchise slot was sold to the French organization Gentle Mates and the team name was tweaked to the "Los Angeles Guerrillas M8". In November 2025, the team relocated to Paris and the name was changed to "Paris Gentle Mates".

== Current roster ==
Paris Gentle Mates roster
Players
Coaches

Handle	Name	Nationality
04	Rodriguez, Jovan	United States
Abuzah	François, Jordan	Belgium
Drazah	Jordan, Zack	United States
JoeDeceives	Romero, Joseph	United States

Head coach

Raymond "Rambo" Lussier

Assistant coach(es)

Ashkan "Cheek" Chitsaz
Troy "Sender" Michaels

Legend:
- (I) Inactive
- (S) Suspended
- Substitute
- (injured) Injury / Illness

Latest roster transaction: November 5, 2026.

== Awards and records ==
=== Seasons overview ===
Season	Regular season							Finish	Playoffs	Note
Season	P	MW	ML	MW%	GW	GL	GW%	Finish	Playoffs	Note
2020	20	5	15	.250	30	53	.361	12th	11-12th, Lost in Losers round 1, 2-3 (OGLA)	As Los Angeles Guerrillas
2021	34	8	26	.235	44	87	.336	11th	Did not qualify	As Los Angeles Guerrillas
2022	32	15	17	.469	59	72	.450	10th	Did not qualify	As Los Angeles Guerrillas
2023	34	9	25	.265	51	86	.372	11th	Did not qualify	As Los Angeles Guerrillas
2024	40	14	26	.350	57	91	.385	6th	7-8th, Lost in Losers round 1, 0-3 (Ultra)	As Los Angeles Guerrillas
2025	32	6	26	.188	42	82	.339	11th	Did not qualify	As Los Angeles Guerrillas M8
2026	52	29	23	.558	109	101	.519	4th	4th, Lost in Losers round 3, 2-3 (Falcons)	As Paris Gentle Mates

=== Tournament wins ===
==== Los Angeles Guerrillas ====
Date	Prize	Event	Roster
2022-04-03	$ 200,000	Call of Duty League 2022 - Major 2	SlasheR • Asim • Huke • Spart • Ricky (coach) • Bevils (coach)

==== Paris Gentle Mates ====
Date	Prize	Event	Roster
2026-02-01	$ 150,000	Call of Duty League 2026 - Major 1	Ghosty • Envoy • Sib • Neptune • Mayhem (coach) • Cheek (coach)

=== Individual accomplishments ===
1st Team All-Star

- JoeDeceives (Joseph Romero) – 2026
