= Vancouver Surge =

Professional Call of Duty League team

- Founded: September 13, 2019
- League: Call of Duty League
- Team history: Seattle Surge (2019–2024); Vancouver Surge (2024–present)
- Based in: Vancouver, British Columbia, Canada
- Colors
- Stage titles: 1 (2022 Major 3)
- Parent group: Canucks Sports & Entertainment, Enthusiast Gaming
- Website: Official website

The Vancouver Surge (formerly the Seattle Surge) are a professional Call of Duty League (CDL) esports team based in Vancouver, British Columbia. Representing the Luminosity Gaming esports organization, the Surge are owned and operated by Enthusiast Gaming and Canucks Sports & Entertainment.

== History ==
=== Early years (2020–present) ===
Following the establishment of the Surge in 2019, Seattle entered the CDL to start the 2020 season. The team's first starting roster was Karma, Octane, Apathy, Enable, and Slacked who were all coached by Joey "Nubzy" DiGiacomo.

Throughout the first two Call of Duty titles the Surge competed in (Modern Warfare and Black Ops: Cold War), the team did not score well in 2020 league matches and finished in last place in the 2020 Call of Duty League Championship. The team underwent multiple roster changes and shifts in the 2020 and 2021 seasons, including the acquisition of players Pandur and Proto in 2020 and a drastic roster change in 2021. The team then consisted of Octane, Classic, Gunless, Prestinni, and Loony. Decemate also made an appearance on the squad, but only for a short time, being released from the Surge just 15 days after signing. Despite these changes, Seattle tallied another disappointing season in 2021 league matches. This led to the release of its entire roster, including the Head Coaching position.

In September 2021, the organization announced the acquisition of veteran Accuracy along with Sib, Pred, and Mack. They also named Sam "Fenix" Spencer as the new head coach and Brandon "Novus" Hewitt as the new general manager.

In the league's first official LAN tournament of the new COD year and title, Call of Duty: Vanguard, the Seattle Surge took 2nd place in the 2022 Kickoff Classic, losing 3–1 map count in the Grand Finals to the Toronto Ultra. They won a match against the 2021 COD World Champions Atlanta FaZe, and also defeated an experienced NYSL team. Seattle Surge went on to defeat the Atlanta Faze in the CDL 2022 Major 3 Grand Final to secure the franchise's first tournament win ever.

The 2022 Season Pred got Rookie of the year. He was also part of the all star team (1st Team) which Sib was on the opposing all star team (2nd Team).

== Roster ==
Vancouver Surge roster
Players
Coaches

Handle	Name	Nationality
Mamba	Solano, Paul	Mexico
Nemensions	TBA	United States
Vik	Vikram	United States
Wevy (Note: Wevy is currently on loan from Cloud9 New York)	Medina, Jason	United States

Head coach

Ricky "Atura" Lugo

Assistant coach(es)

Travis "Jokr" Speer

Legend:
- (I) Inactive
- (S) Suspended
- Substitute
- (injured) Injury / Illness

Latest roster transaction: October 22, 2026.

== Awards and records ==
=== Seasons overview ===
Season	Regular season							Finish	Playoffs	Note
Season	P	MW	ML	MW%	GW	GL	GW%	Finish	Playoffs	Note
2020	21	5	16	.238	32	53	.376	11th	11-12th, Lost in Losers round 1, 0-3 (Legion)	As Seattle Surge
2021	36	11	25	.306	56	85	.397	9th	Did not qualify	As Seattle Surge
2022	30	15	15	.500	65	62	.512	5th	3rd, Lost in Losers finals, 1-3 (FaZe)	As Seattle Surge
2023	39	18	21	.462	75	80	.484	8th	4th, Lost in Losers round 3, 1-3 (FaZe)	As Seattle Surge
2024	40	16	24	.400	70	90	.438	5th	7-8th, Lost in Losers round 1, 2-3 (Heretics)	As Seattle Surge
2025	43	25	18	.581	94	84	.528	4th	2nd, Lost in Grand Finals, 3–5 (OpTic)	As Vancouver Surge
2026	37	10	27	.270	44	91	.326	11th	Did not qualify	As Vancouver Surge

=== Tournament wins ===
Date	Prize	Event	Roster
2022-06-05	$ 200,000	Call of Duty League 2022 - Major 3	Accuracy • Mack • Sib • Pred • Fenix (coach) • Equuip (coach)

=== Individual accomplishments ===
Rookie of the year

- Pred (Amer Zulbeari) – 2022

1st Team All-Star

- Pred (Amer Zulbeari) – 2022

2nd Team All-Star

- Pred (Amer Zulbeari) – 2023
- Sib (Daunte Gray) – 2022
