= Carolina Royal Ravens =

American Call of Duty esports team

- Founded: 13 September 2019
- League: Call of Duty League
- Team history: London Royal Ravens (2019–2023); Carolina Royal Ravens (2023–present)
- Based in: Charlotte, North Carolina, U.S.
- Colors
- Parent group: ReKTGlobal
- Website: Official website

The Carolina Royal Ravens (formerly London Royal Ravens) are an American professional Call of Duty League (CDL) esports team based in Charlotte, North Carolina. The Carolina Royal Ravens are owned by ReKTGlobal, an esports parent company who also owns Rogue.

== History ==
ReKTGlobal announced that it had bought the London slot in the CDL on 13 September 2019. The team was the first of the twelve CDL teams to reveal its branding, announced on 15 October 2019 as the London Royal Ravens. The team name was inspired by the Ravens of the Tower of London legend.

On 12 November 2020, it was announced that Sidemen member Vikram "Vikkstar123" Singh Barn had become the co-owner of the team.

Ahead of the 2024 season, the franchise was relocated to the Carolinas in the United States, rebranding the franchise as the Carolina Royal Ravens.

== Current roster ==
Carolina Royal Ravens roster
Players
Coaches

Handle	Name	Nationality
Nejra	Pabo'n, Jonathan	Puerto Rico
Owakening	Conley, Joseph	United States
Renegade	Willette, Jonathan	United States
Skyz	Bueno, Cesar	United States

Head coach

Jonathan “Ronin” Conklin

Legend:
- (I) Inactive
- (S) Suspended
- Substitute
- (injured) Injury / Illness

Latest roster transaction: November 5, 2026.

== Awards and records ==
=== Seasons overview ===
Season	Regular season							Finish	Playoffs	Note
Season	P	MW	ML	MW%	GW	GL	GW%	Finish	Playoffs	Note
2020	26	12	14	.462	57	60	.487	6th	4th, Lost in Losers round 5, 1-3 (Huntsmen)	As London Royal Ravens
2021	32	9	23	.281	45	79	.363	10th	Did not qualify	As London Royal Ravens
2022	31	17	14	.548	63	62	.504	4th	7-8th, Lost in Losers round 1, 2-3 (Subliners)	As London Royal Ravens
2023	31	7	24	.226	40	81	.331	12th	Did not qualify	As London Royal Ravens
2024	37	13	24	.351	65	88	.425	10th	Did not qualify	As Carolina Royal Ravens
2025	40	20	20	.500	75	78	.490	6th	7-8th, Lost in Losers round 1, 0-3 (FaZe)	As Carolina Royal Ravens
2026	38	16	22	.421	65	85	.433	9th	Did not qualify	As Carolina Royal Ravens
