= Riyadh Falcons =

Saudi Arabian esports team

- Founded: May 02, 2019
- League: Call of Duty League
- Team history: Paris Legion (2019–2022); Vegas Legion (2022–2024); Vegas Falcons (2024–2025); Riyadh Falcons (2025–present)
- Based in: Riyadh, Saudi Arabia
- Colors
- Parent group: Team Falcons
- Website: Official website

The Riyadh Falcons are a Saudi Arabian professional Call of Duty League (CDL) esports team based in Riyadh. Originally founded as the Paris Legion by C0ntact Gaming, Paris was announced as one of the first five cities to host a CDL team. According to ESPN, the publisher was looking to sell slots for approximately $25 million per team. Despite being one of the first five cities to join the CDL, the team was the final one to unveil their branding on November 2, 2019. The organisation moved to Las Vegas ahead of the 2022 season, becoming the Vegas Legion. Before the 2025 season, the team was sold to Saudi esports organization Team Falcons and rebranded as the Vegas Falcons, then relocated again to Riyadh before the 2026 season becoming the Riyadh Falcons.

== History ==
=== Paris Legion (2020–2022) ===
Upon entering the CDL, the team then consisted of the following five man squad: Denz, KiSMET, Louqa, Shockz, and Zed. The team began the season at the bottom of the standings, being looked at as the clear underdogs. Paris immediately responded with upset victories over OpTic Gaming LA and the London Royal Ravens. The team's success did not continue throughout the season however. The team went on to finish the 2020 season with a lackluster record of 11–17, as well as an early exit from the playoffs. This poor showing led the team to drop its entire roster.

After a rough start to their participation in the CDL, Paris released their whole roster and elected to sign Skrapz, Aqua, Classic, and Fire40. Fire was released from the team and replaced by Temp. Not long after, Paris looked to make another roster change and acquired Zaptius in place of Classic, who went to Seattle Surge near the tail-end of the 2021 season.

After a disappointing 2021 season for the French team, the roster was once again shaken up headed into Vanguard with John, Decemate, Felo, and Temp. They would find little success and would eventually release Decemate and Felo to replace them with GRVTY and Jimbo.

=== Vegas Legion (2022–2024) ===
On 1 June 2022, the Paris Legion announced that the franchise would be relocating to Las Vegas for the 2023 season. The team officially announced that it had relocated to Las Vegas on 12 September 2022, and with the move changed its name to Vegas Legion.

=== Vegas Falcons (2024–2025) ===
In August 2024, Saudi Arabian organization Team Falcons announced that they had acquired the team and renamed it to the Vegas Falcons, while also announcing the roster of Exnid, Khhx, KingAbody, and Roxas with LewTee as the head coach. In November 2024, the team announced that three-time Call of Duty world champion Clayster would be joining the coaching staff. In December 2024, Khhx and KingAbody were benched and D7oom and WXSL were called up from the academy team. In January 2025, KiinG was called up and Roxas was benched. In March 2025, after not winning match in throughout the first two stages, LewTee was fired as head coach. In April 2025, the entire roster (barring Exnid) was benched and the team signed former world champions Arcitys, Pred, and Preistahh.

=== Riyadh Falcons (2025–present) ===
In September 2025, the team relocated to Riyadh and were renamed to "Riyadh Falcons". The team also announced the signing of Cellium.

== Current roster ==
Riyadh Falcons roster
Players
Coaches

Handle	Name	Nationality
Cellium	Jovel, McArthur	United States
KiSMET	Tinsley, Matthew	United States
Kremp	Haworth, Kyle	United States
Sib	Gray, Daunte	United States

Head coach

Mehran "Mayhem" Anjomshoa

Assistant coach(es)

Mutab

Legend:
- (I) Inactive
- (S) Suspended
- Substitute
- (injured) Injury / Illness

Latest roster transaction: October 30, 2026.

== Awards and records ==
=== Seasons overview ===
Season	Regular season							Finish	Playoffs	Note
Season	P	MW	ML	MW%	GW	GL	GW%	Finish	Playoffs	Note
2020	26	10	26	.385	41	57	.418	10th	9-10th, Lost in Losers round 2, 1–3 (Ravens)	As Paris Legion
2021	30	8	22	.267	42	73	.365	12th	Did not qualify	As Paris Legion
2022	25	2	23	.080	31	73	.298	12th	Did not qualify	As Paris Legion
2023	39	18	21	.462	73	89	.451	9th	Did not qualify	As Vegas Legion
2024	37	15	22	.405	65	79	.451	9th	Did not qualify	As Vegas Legion
2025	31	3	28	.097	26	89	.226	12th	Did not qualify	As Vegas Falcons
2026	44	24	20	.545	88	82	.518	7th	3rd, Lost in Losers Finals, 1–3 (OpTic)	As Riyadh Falcons
