= Los Angeles Thieves =

American esports team

- Short name: LA Thieves
- Founded: November 6, 2020; 6 years ago
- League: Call of Duty League
- Team history: Los Angeles Thieves (2020–present)
- Based in: Los Angeles, California, U.S.
- Colors
- Championships: 1 (2022)
- Stage titles: 5 (2022 Major 4) (2023 Major 4) (2025 Major 3 & 4) (2026 Major 3)
- Partners: AT&T; Lexus; Oakley; Razer; United States Navy
- Parent group: 100 Thieves
- Website: thieves.callofdutyleague.com/en-us/

The Los Angeles Thieves (or LA Thieves) are an American professional Call of Duty League (CDL) esports team based in Los Angeles, California. The team is owned by 100 Thieves. The Thieves won the 2022 world championship and have won five stage titles.

== History ==
=== 2021 season: Cold War ===
On November 6, 2020, 100 Thieves announced their expansion in the Call of Duty League, following the purchase of the slot previously owned by Immortals Gaming Club under the branding of OpTic Gaming Los Angeles. This marked the return of former professional player turned CEO Matthew Haag to the scene where his career started.

The LA Thieves did not obtain a spot in the inaugural 2020 Call of Duty League season. They inherited the roster of Kenneth "Kenny" Williams, Thomas "TJHaLy" Haly, Austin "SlasheR" Liddicoat, and Zack "Drazah" Jordan as a substitute, and later added Donovan "Temp" Laroda as their fourth and Jordan "JKap" Kaplan as their coach. During the 2021 season, the team made numerous roster changes and benchings, signing various players such as Carlos "Venom Hernandez, Cuyler "Huke" Garland, and Johnathon "John" Perez. The team finished the 2021 Call of Duty League season with a 7th place in the Regular Season, and a 7th/8th finish at the Championship Weekend, with the final variation of the starting roster being Drazah, John, Kenny, and SlasheR.

=== 2022 season: Vanguard ===
After the end of the 2021 season the team released John, TJHaLy, Venom, SlasheR, and Huke, with Sam "Octane" Larew and Dylan "Envoy" Hannon joining the starting lineup and Nathaniel "Pentagrxm" Thomas as a substitute. During the middle of the season, Shane "ShAnE" McKerral joined the coaching staff as an assistant. 2022 was the team's most successful year, winning their first major title at Major IV in New York City, then claiming the 2022 Call of Duty League Championship title, defeating Atlanta FaZe in the grand finals 5–2.

=== 2023 season: Modern Warfare II ===
The team started their offseason by making no changes and keeping the same roster (barring Pentagrxm). During major 2 qualifiers, the team brought in Kenyen "Capsidal" Sutton as a temporary substitute due to Kenny dealing with health issues. Kenny was able to return later on in the qualifiers. The team once again finished 1st in the fourth major of the season and captured their second major title. They ended the season placing 7th-8th in the 2023 CDL Championship after being eliminated by the Seattle Surge.

=== 2024 season: Modern Warfare III ===
During the offseason, Octane announced his retirement from competitive Call of Duty , while Drazah, Envoy, and Kenny all left the team. In September 2023, the team announced the roster of Marcus "Afro" Reid, Cameron "Cammy" McKilligan, Daniel "Ghosty" Rothe, and Joseph "JoeDeceives" Romero. After placing 9th-12th in the first major and a 2–5 record in the qualifiers, Cammy was released and JoeDeceives was moved to substitute with Kyle "Kremp" Haworth and Byron "Nastie" Plumridge joining the roster. After placing 9th-12th again in major 2, Afro was benched and JoeDeceives was moved back to the starting roster. They ended the season placing 4th in the 2024 CDL Championship after being eliminated by the Toronto Ultra.

=== 2025 season: Black Ops 6 ===
During the offseason, the team mutually agreed to part ways with head coach JKap and players Afro, Kremp, Nastie, and JoeDeceives were all released. In September 2024, the team announced Ghosty, a returning Envoy, Paco "HyDra" Rusiewiez, and Thomas "Scrap" Ernst as their starting roster for the 2025 season and promoted assistant coach ShAnE to head coach with Troy "Sender" Michaels joining the coaching staff as an assistant. The team would go on to have their most successful regular season since 2022 by winning the second minor tournament, along with the third and fourth major tournaments, and finishing 1st in the regular season standings. At the end of the season, Scrap was named the regular season MVP and the team placed 7th-8th in the 2025 CDL Championship after being eliminated by the Vancouver Surge.

=== 2026 season: Black Ops 7 ===
During the offseason, Ghosty and Envoy were both released. In September 2025, the team announced the return of Kenny and the signing of Tyler "aBeZy" Pharris. After a top 6 finish at the first major, the team decided to release Kenny and signed top amateur Jeremiah "Nium" Harrison. The team once again achieved regular season success by winning both minor tournmanets, along with the third major, and 2nd in the regular seasons standings. Scrap was once again named regular season MVP and Nium was named the 2026 Rookie of The Year, but the team struggled heavily at the 2026 CDL Championship and again placed 7th-8th after being eliminated by G2 Minnesota.

The LA Thieves ended the 2026 Black Ops 7 Season with a 3rd place finish at the Esports World Cup.

=== 2027 season: Mordern Warfare IV ===
During the offseason, the team announced the departures of Nium, HyDra, Scrap, and assistant coach Sender. On November 4, 2026, the team announced its starting roster for the 2027 season, consisting of aBeZy, Ghosty and Envoy, with the latter two returning to the team, alongside top amateur player Dayton "DK" K.

== Current roster ==
Los Angeles Thieves roster
Players
Coaches

Handle	Name	Nationality
aBeZy	Pharris, Tyler	United States
DK	K, Dayton	Wales
Envoy	Hannon, Dylan	United States
Ghosty	Rothe, Daniel	United States

Head coach

Shane "ShAnE" McKerral

Legend:
- (I) Inactive
- (S) Suspended
- Substitute
- (injured) Injury / Illness

Latest roster transaction: November 4, 2026.

== Awards and records ==
=== Seasons overview ===
Season	Regular season							Finish	Playoffs
Season	P	MW	ML	MW%	GW	GL	GW%	Finish	Playoffs
2021	39	18	21	.462	74	83	.471	7th	7-8th, Lost in Lower Round 1, 2–3 (Rokkr)
2022	35	18	17	.514	76	69	.524	3rd	1st, Won Grand Finals, 5–2 (FaZe)
2023	46	27	19	.587	103	75	.579	5th	7-8th, Lost in Lower Round 1, 2–3 (Surge)
2024	37	17	20	.459	69	84	.451	7th	4th, Lost in Lower Round 3, 2-3 (Ultra)
2025	48	37	11	.771	131	55	.704	1st	7-8th, Lost in Lower Round 1, 0-3 (Surge)
2026	53	38	15	.717	134	79	.629	2nd	7-8th, Lost in Lower Round 1, 2-3 (G2)

=== Tournament wins ===
==== Major ====
Date	Prize	Event	Roster
2022-07-17	$200,000	Call of Duty League 2022 - Major 4	Drazah • Kenny • Octane • Envoy • JKap (coach) • ShAnE (coach)
2022-08-07	$1,200,000	Call of Duty League Championship 2022	Drazah • Kenny • Octane • Envoy • JKap (coach) • ShAnE (coach)
2023-04-23	$200,000	Call of Duty League 2023 - Major 4	Drazah • Kenny • Octane • Envoy • JKap (coach) • ShAnE (coach)
2025-04-27	$150,000	Call of Duty League 2025 - Major 3	Ghosty • Envoy • HyDra • Scrap • ShAnE (coach) • Sender (coach)
2025-05-25	$150,000	Call of Duty League 2025 - Major 4	Ghosty • Envoy • HyDra • Scrap • ShAnE (coach) • Sender (coach)
2026-05-17	$150,000	Call of Duty League 2026 - Major 3	HyDra • Scrap • aBeZy • Nium • ShAnE (coach) • Sender (coach)

==== Minor ====
Date	Prize	Event	Roster
2025-03-02	$20,000	Call of Duty League 2025 - Minor 2	Ghosty • Envoy • HyDra • Scrap • ShAnE (coach) • Sender (coach)
2026-04-26	$20,000	Call of Duty League 2026 - Minor 1	HyDra • Scrap • aBeZy • Nium • ShAnE (coach) • Sender (coach)
2026-06-07	$20,000	Call of Duty League 2026 - Minor 2	HyDra • Scrap • aBeZy • Nium • ShAnE (coach) • Sender (coach)

=== Individual accomplishments ===
Season MVP

- Scrap (Thomas Ernst) – 2025, 2026

Champs MVP

- Kenny (Kenneth Williams) – 2022

Rookie of The Year

- Nium (Jeremiah Harrison) – 2026

1st Team All-Star

- HyDra (Paco Rusiewiez) – 2025, 2026
- Scrap (Thomas Ernst) – 2025, 2026

2nd Team All-Star

- Octane (Sam Larew) – 2023
