= Enthusiast Gaming =

Canadian digital media company

- Trade name: Enthusiast Gaming Holdings Inc.
- Type: Public
- Traded as: TSX: EGLX
- Industry: Video game journalism
- Founded: 2014; 12 years ago
- Founder: Menashe Kestenbaum
- Key people: Francesco Aquilini (chairman); Adrian Montgomery (interim CEO)
- Website: https://www.enthusiastgaming.com

Enthusiast Gaming Holdings Inc. is a Canadian digital media company specializing in video game journalism. Founded in 2014 by entrepreneur Menashe Kestenbaum, the company owned the websites Destructoid and Escapist Magazine from 2014 to September 2022, as well the gaming convention Enthusiast Gaming Live Expo (EGLX) from 2015 to 2019.

The company went public on the TSX Venture Exchange in October 2018. In January 2020, the company's listing moved to the Toronto Stock Exchange. The company was also trading on the Nasdaq from April 2021 to October 2023. Enthusiast Gaming owns a number of websites and runs an annual convention in Toronto.

== Brands ==
=== Websites ===
- DiabloII Net & Wiki (acquired 2018)
- Gaming Street (founded 2019)
- Planet Destiny (acquired 2019)
- Steel Media (Pocket Gamer) (acquired 2019)
- The Sims Resource (acquired 2019)
- Omnia Media (acquired 2020)
- Vedatis (Icy Veins) (acquired 2021)
- Tabwire (Tabstats) (acquired 2021)
- GameKnot (acquired 2021)
- Addicting Games (acquired 2021)
- U.GG (acquired 2021)
- Beyond Games (founded 2021)

==== Former ====
Gamurs Group acquired six websites and several brands from Enthusiast Gaming in September 2022:

- Destructoid (acquired 2017)
  - Flixist (acquired 2017)
  - Japanator (acquired 2017 and merged into Siliconera)
  - Gamnesia (acquired 2018 and merged into Nintendo Enthusiast)
  - Nintendo Enthusiast (founded 2011 by Enthusiast Gaming founder and merged into Destructoid)
- The Escapist (acquired 2018)
  - Gameumentary (acquired 2018)
  - Only Single Player (acquired 2016)
- Operation Sports (acquired 2018)
- PC Invasion (acquired 2018)
  - PC Enthusiast (founded 2015 and merged into PC Invasion)
- Siliconera (acquired 2019)
- Upcomer (founded 2021)
  - Daily Esports (founded 2018 and merged into Upcomer)
- Xbox Enthusiast (founded 2015, website closed in 2019)
- PlayStation Enthusiast (founded 2015, website closed in 2019)

== Esports teams ==
- Vancouver Titans (Overwatch – Overwatch League)
- Seattle Surge (Call of Duty)

=== Former ===
- Luminosity Gaming (multiple titles, sold to Vertiqal Studios in 2025)

== Enthusiast Gaming Live Expo ==
The Enthusiast Gaming Live Expo (EGLX) was an annual gaming convention hosted at the Metro Toronto Convention Centre from 2015 to 2019. It is billed as Canada's largest video game convention, with a reported peak of 30,000 attendees. In October 2018, Enthusiast Gaming announced that EGLX will host the World Electronic Sports Games Canadian Championship. EGLX 2020 was delayed from October to November due to the ongoing COVID-19 pandemic and was hosted live on streaming services. No public plans to resume hosting Enthusiast Gaming Live Expo have been announced.
