= Crimsix =

American professional esports player

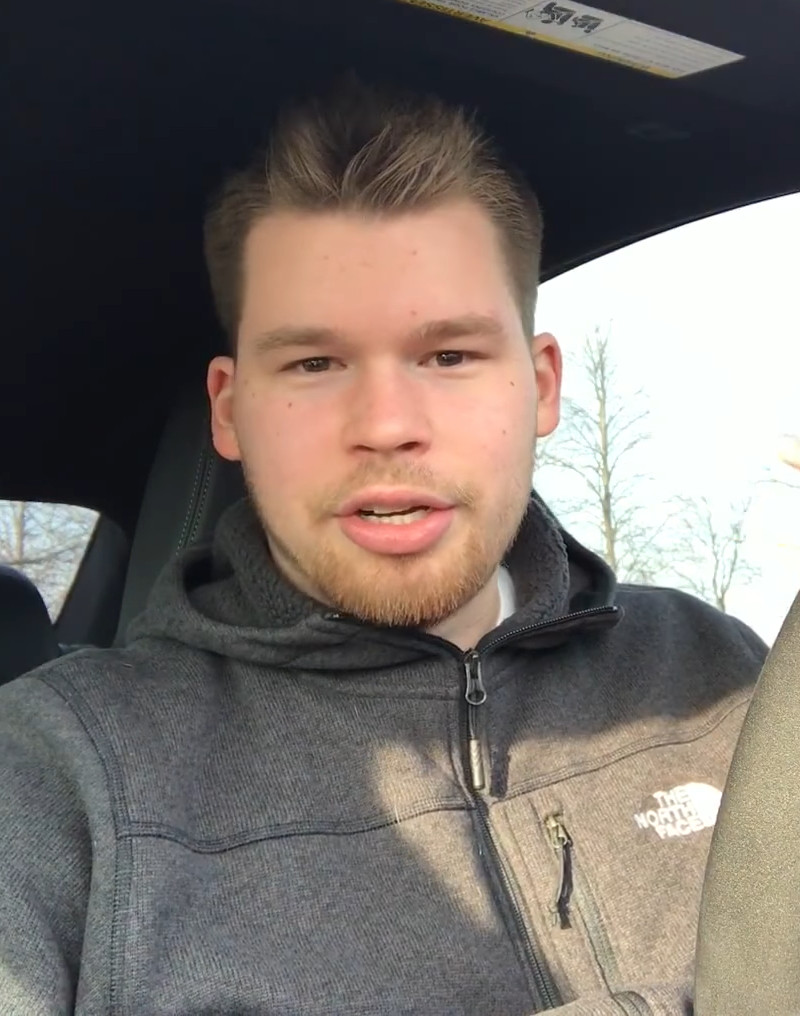
- Porter in 2016

Personal information
- Name: Ian Porter
- Nickname(s): Crim, C6
- Born: 1992 or 1993 (age 33–34)
- Nationality: American

Career information
- Games: Halo; Call of Duty; RENNSPORT
- Playing career: 2008–2012 (Halo); 2012–2022 (Call of Duty)

Team history
- 2012–2014: compLexity Gaming
- 2014: Evil Geniuses
- 2014–2019: Optic Gaming
- 2020–2021: Dallas Empire
- 2021–2022: New York Subliners

Career highlights and awards
- 3× Call of Duty Championship champion (2014, 2017, 2020); Winningest Call of Duty player (39 wins)

Twitch information
- Channel: Crimsix
- Years active: 2010–present
- Followers: 490 thousand

IMSA VP Racing SportsCar Challenge career
- Debut season: 2025
- Current team: RAFA Racing Team
- Car number: 68
- Starts: 2
- Championships: 0
- Wins: 1
- Podiums: 1
- Poles: 0

Previous series
- 2024: Porsche Sprint Challenge North America

Championship titles
- 2024: Porsche Sprint Challenge North America
Medal record
Representing United States
Summer X Games
Bronze medal – third place	2014 Austin	MLG COD: Ghosts
- Statistics up to date as of March 3, 2025.

Ian Porter, better known as Crimsix, is an American racing driver and former professional Call of Duty player. As an esports competitor he has represented multiple organizations in multiple game titles, most notably representing Optic Gaming and Complexity in Call of Duty.

== Halo career ==
Starting in 2008 Ian "Crimsix" Porter began gaming competitively when he noticed that there was a large number of skilled players competing at MLG events across the country. With the release of Halo: Reach he began playing on the MLG Pro circuit and placed 4th at MLG Columbus. Across the rest of the season, Porter continued to place well at other events. However, in 2012 Halo: Reach was removed from the MLG Pro Circuit and replaced by Call of Duty: Black Ops 2.

== Call of Duty career ==
=== compLexity ===
==== Black Ops 2 ====
Porter made the switch from Halo to Call of Duty joining the compLexity Gaming organization and roster of ACHES, TeePee and FEARS in December 2012. Midway through the season, compLexity would add Clayster to the roster. They would find immediate success winning their very next event and would eventually finish second in Black Ops 2 season standings for the 2012-2013 season.

==== Ghosts ====
Going in to Ghosts the domination would continue with the team winning the MLG Columbus 2013 however the team decided to drop Clayster citing internal conflicts. The team would replace him with world champion Karma they would instantly click and win the next event. Porter and his teammates would win the Call of Duty Championship 2014 in emphatic fashion only dropping 4 maps in the entire tournament. After becoming world champions they would continue to dominate by winning MLG CoD League Season 1 Playoffs and UGC Niagara 2014. After the event on May 6, 2014, compLexity would announce that the roster had been purchased by Evil Geniuses.

=== Evil Geniuses ===
==== Ghosts ====
After the team's transition to the new organization, they had continued success by maintaining first place in the league and were the first team to clinch a spot in the Championship bracket at MLG Anaheim. With the first LAN event at the MLG X Games Invitational. The team had the number 1 seed going into the event due to their win at the 2014 Call of Duty Championship. They secured the 2nd seed in their group setting up a match-up against OpTic Gaming in the Semifinals. They lost the match 3-1 and were knocked down to the Bronze Medal Game. They would beat EnVyUs taking the bronze medal at the first ever MLG event at X Games. This was the first event the team had lost on Ghosts. The team would come back after this disappointment to the next event MLG Anaheim, getting their revenge over Optic in the final and winning the event. A month later the team would attend Gfinity 3, the event was not a good one, with them placing 5th-8th and out of the money. This would be the first time Porter had finished outside the top 4 in his Call of Duty career.

Evil Geniuses did not attend UMG Dallas in August 2014. 2 days after the Dallas event, Karma would announce that he wanted to leave the team; a day later he was benched. With Karma leaving to go to FaZe Clan and Dedo coming to Evil Geniuses, the team now consisted of ACHES, TeePee, Crimsix, and Dedo. This new look EG squad would look to start their career ahead with Dedo with a win, but that was not to be at UMG Nashville with the team finishing a disappointing 13th-16th. The team failed to qualify for the MLG CoD League Season 3 Playoffs of the MLG CoD League. As the defending champions, the team traveled to France to compete at ESWC 2014. With rumors about the squad parting ways, they were not expected to place well. However, they went out with a bang as they beat TCM Gaming 3–1 in the Grand Final.

After the victory at ESWC 2014, it was very clear that the roster would not be sticking together heading into the Advanced Warfare season. On November 14, 2014, it was revealed that all 5 players' contracts were bought out by OpTic Gaming. Enabling the roster to join any team organization they pleased. In the end, ACHES would go to FaZe Clan and Dedo would head to Team FeaR. Porter, Teepee, and Karma were all picked up by the OpTic Gaming organization, with TeePee and Karma going to OpTic Nation, whereas Crimsix went to OpTic Gaming.

=== Optic Gaming ===
==== Advanced Warfare ====
With a roster consisting of Nadeshot, Scump, Formal, and Crimsix, the team won three out of the first five events of the year, but would perform poorly at Call of Duty Championship 2015 finishing 7th. This poor placement pushed Nadeshot into retirement and allowed the team to add Porter's former teammate Karma from Optic Nation. Karma would finally make his debut at UMG California 2015, which the team would win. This roster would go on to win three of the final six events of the year, whilst also placing second three times.

==== Black Ops 3 ====
The roster would continue going into the Black Ops 3 season. Qualifying for the 2016 NA CWL Stage 1 Regular Season and winning the corresponding playoffs that would follow. The team would win three more events before being upset at the 2016 NA CWL Stage 2 Playoffs. They would bounce back however winning the MLG Orlando Open 2016 but once again failed to perform at the biggest event of the year placing 7-8th at the 2016 Call of Duty Championship.

==== Infinite Warfare ====
Infinite Warfare started slowly with the team placing 5-6th at the 2017 CWL Las Vegas Open. OpTic placed second at the 2017 CWL Atlanta Open and then won the 2017 CWL Paris Open and the 2017 CWL Dallas Open. These strong placements qualified them for the 2017 CWL Global Pro League Stage 1. The team placed 4th in the playoffs and 7-8th at the 2017 CWL Anaheim Open. With fans skeptical about the strength of the roster, OpTic Gaming finished the year as the undisputed best team by winning the 2017 CWL Global Pro League Stage 2 and finally claiming victory at the elusive Call of Duty Championship. This would be the first Call of Duty Championship win for the Optic Gaming organization and would make Porter a 2-time Call of Duty World Champion.

==== WWII ====
Initially, the roster would stay together going into the WWII season. However, the team had inconsistent placings, inconsistent practice regime, and poor results at the first five major events, most notably placing 13-16th at the 2018 Seattle Open. The roster which is considered one of the best teams of all time would split up. Removing FormaL and Karma and picking up Octane and Methodz, however, this roster change would not solve their tournament drought. The end to WWII saw them place 5-6th at the 2018 CWL Anaheim Open, 7-8th at the Stage 2 playoffs, and a shocking 17-24th at the 2018 CWL Championship the lowest champs placing of Porter's career. This was the first time since Black Ops 2 that Porter would fail to win a single championship title throughout a season.

==== Black Ops 4 ====
After the announcement of a 5-player roster in the Black Ops 4 season, OpTic decided to drop Methodz and Octane, and pick up young talents Dashy and TJHaLy, as well as re-adding Karma back into the lineup. The line-up consisted of Crimsix, Scump, Dashy, TJHaly, and Karma. After dominating online tournaments they would win the 2019 CWL Las Vegas Open (their first Major tournament win since the 2017 CWL Championship) and the first event of the year. Porter and the team would place well throughout the rest of the season placing top 3 on a number of occasions, however, they would not win another event.

=== Dallas Empire ===
==== Modern Warfare ====
On October 10, 2019 Activision would announce that the Call of Duty pro circuit would be switching to a city base franchised league following the Overwatch League model. On October 18, 2019 Dallas Empire a franchise owned by Team Envy would announce that Porter had joined their team. The team would later go on to announce the final roster as: Clayster, Huke, iLLeY, and Shotzzy alongside Crimsix. The team entered the inaugural CDL season as one of the top teams, but sadly suffered two losses at Launch Weekend. The team quickly found its expected form, and found continual success throughout the season. This success of course was capped off with the team winning 1st at the Call of Duty League Championship 2020. This marked the third championship ring for Crimsix.

==== Black Ops Cold War ====
Crimsix stayed with the Dallas Empire for the Black Ops Cold War season, with the team failing to win any of the season's five majors and finishing third during the Championship Weekend. After the end of the season the Dallas Empire and Crimsix announced that he would be allowed to leave the team as a Restricted Free Agent.

=== New York Subliners ===
==== Vanguard ====
Crimsix announced on October 22, 2021, that he would be joining the New York Subliners for the 2021-22 CDL season via a tweet. Also announced in the tweet were the additional roster members for the Subliners, which included Neptune, Hydra, and the 3x World Champion Clayster. After struggling through the first two majors, Subliners won the 2022 Pro-Am Classic with Crimsix, Hydra, Kismet and PaulEhx. He left the team at the end of the season.

== Racing career ==
In 2023, Crimsix announced he was retiring from CoD and was going to instead compete as a professional sim racer with FaZe clan. He left the organization in November 2024.

After partnering with RAFA Racing Team, Porter began racing in real life; he lost 30 pounds training for the discipline. Porter entered the Porsche Sprint Challenge North America in 2024, racing a Porsche 718 Cayman for RAFA. After sweeping his debut weekend in the season opener at Sebring International Raceway, he ended the season with ten wins and the championship in the Cayman Pro-Am Driver's class.

RAFA joined IMSA in 2025 and signed Porter to race a Toyota GR Supra EVO2 in the IMSA VP Racing SportsCar Challenge's GSX Bronze Cup. Porter scored his first IMSA win at Circuit of the Americas.
