= Scump =

American content creator and professional Call of Duty player

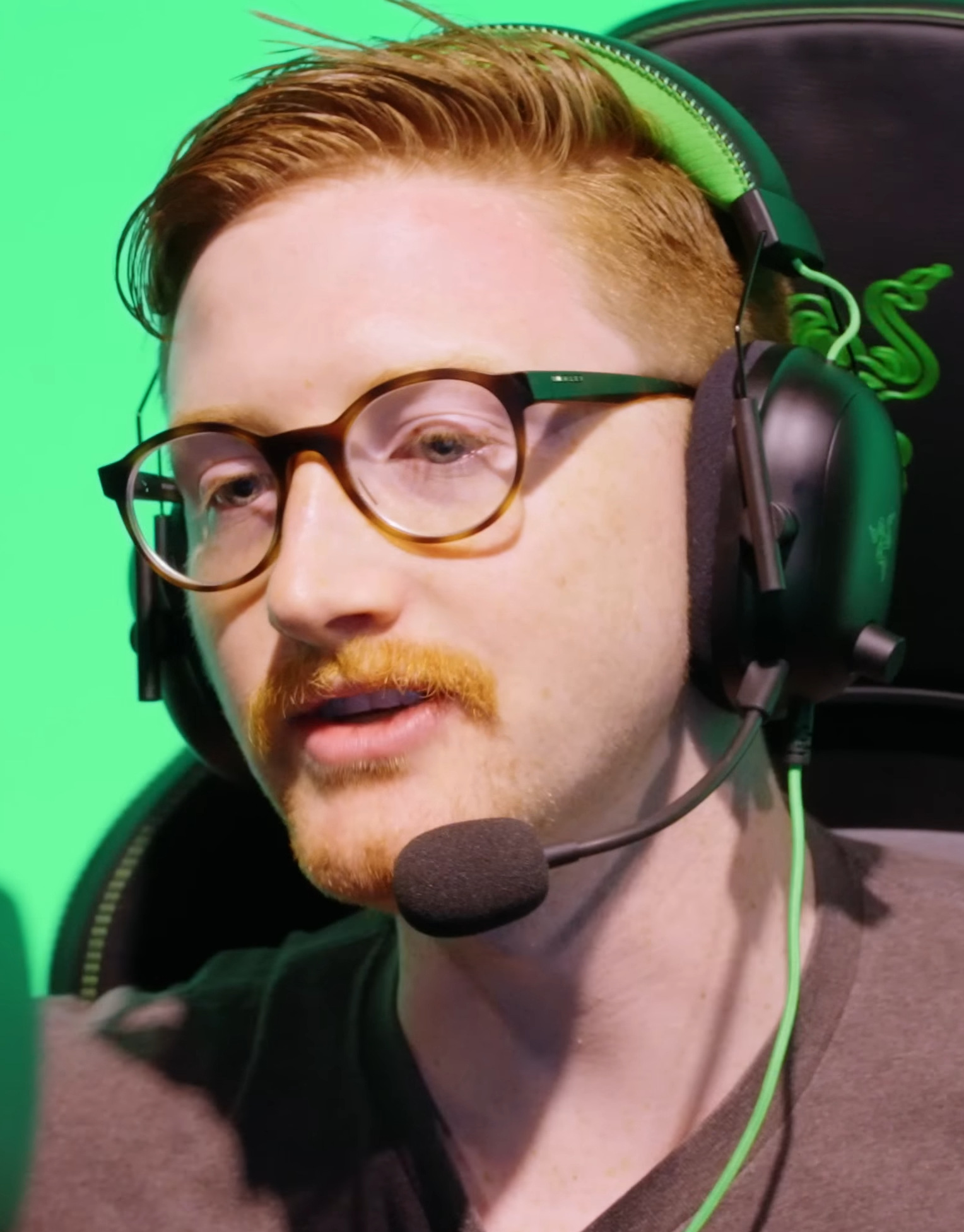
- Abner in 2023

Personal information
- Name: Seth Abner
- Born: June 30, 1995 (age 31)
- Nationality: American

Career information
- Game: Call of Duty
- Playing career: 2011–2023
- Role: SMG Slayer

Team history
- 2011: Quantic LeveraGe
- 2011–2012: OpTic Gaming
- 2012: apeX eSports NA
- 2012–2014: OpTic Gaming
- 2014: Team EnVyUs
- 2014–2019: OpTic Gaming
- 2019–2020: Chicago Huntsmen
- 2020–2021: OpTic Chicago
- 2021–2023: OpTic Texas

Career highlights and awards
- COD World Champion (2017); 30x Call of Duty Tournament Champion; 2× MLG X Games champion (2014, 2015); 2016 Esports Console Player of the Year; 2021 World Series of Warzone Solo Yolo Champion

Twitch information
- Channel: scump
- Years active: 2010–present
- Followers: 2 million
- Last updated: 28 October 2026

Seth Abner (born June 30, 1995), also known as scump or scumperjumper, is an American content creator and former professional Call of Duty player. Associated with OpTic Gaming for much of his career, Scump last played for the Call of Duty League team OpTic Texas. Abner is a two time Major League Gaming (MLG) X Games gold medalist. During the first ever Esports Awards in 2016, Abner won the Esports Console Player of the Year award. In August 2017, Abner achieved his first ever Call of Duty World Championship. He is considered to be the most popular and one of the greatest Call of Duty players of all time.

== Call of Duty esports career ==
=== Call of Duty: Black Ops II (2012–2013 season) ===
Abner played for OpTic for the Call of Duty: Black Ops II season. OpTic would take their only 1st-place finish at UMG Chicago, but would never finish outside of the top 10. OpTic achieved a 3rd-place finish at the 2013 Call of Duty Championship to finish off the 2012–2013 season.

=== Call of Duty: Ghosts (2013–2014 season) ===
Abner stayed on OpTic going into the Call of Duty: Ghosts season. However, after a 9th-place finish at the MLG Fall Championship and a 13th-place finish at UMG Philadelphia, Abner announced he would be leaving OpTic and joining Team EnVyUs alongside Merk, ProoFy, and Goonjar because of a rivalry with Nadeshot. Less than two-weeks after his departure from OpTic, Abner announced that he was leaving Envy and returning to Optic. He would rejoin the lineup of Nadeshot, MBoZe, and Clayster for the Call of Duty Championship 2014. The squad finished 3rd for the second year in a row. After that tournament, the team picked up ProoFy to replace MBoZe, who then became captain of OpTic Nation. The new team placed in the top eight at UGC Niagara, and was invited to attend the MLG X Games Invitational. Here, OpTic advanced all the way through their bracket to face Team Kaliber in the Grand Final. OpTic won, and Abner became one of the first gold medalists for Call of Duty. The next few events were inconsistent for OpTic, with 4th and 5th placings at Gfinity 3, UMG Dallas, UMG Nashville, and MLG CoD League Season 3 Playoffs.

=== Call of Duty: Advanced Warfare (2014–2015 season) ===
Upon release of Call of Duty: Advanced Warfare, OpTic parted ways with Clayster and ProoFy and added Matt "Formal" Piper, Ian "Crimsix" Porter to the team. The team initially placed second to Crimsix's longtime teammate Aches at the first event of the season, and afterwards placed first at UMG Orlando 2015, the MLG Pro League Season 1 Playoffs, and the Call of Duty Championship's NA Regional event. At the 2015 Call of Duty World Championship, the team placed a disappointing 7th after they went into the event as the clear favorites. After the event, Abner's longtime teammate, Nadeshot, decided to leave competitive Call of Duty and was replaced by Damon "Karma" Barlow, with Abner becoming the team captain. As the new captain of OpTic Gaming, Abner led the team to 6 more championships and 2 more Pro League Regular Season wins to end the Advanced Warfare season. They won ESWC Zénith 2015 and Gfinity Spring Masters 1 with Enable in place of Karma, but as they returned to the United States they went to California to compete at UMG California 2015 with Karma. When they won UMG Cali it marked their 3rd straight event win in three consecutive weekends in three different countries. They then finished 1st in Season 2 of the MLG Pro League to qualify for MLG Pro League Season 2 Playoffs at the summer XGAMES in Austin, Texas, where he and OpTic defended their title and won his second gold medal. OpTic and Abner then finished 2nd to FaZe Clan at UMG Dallas 2015 and Gfinity Summer Championship. They bounced back as they won UMG Washington D.C. 2015 and MLG Pro League Season 3 Regular Season, where they went 11–0 in the season. Once again, they fell short and placed 2nd to Abner's ex-teammate, Clayster's FaZe team for the final time in AW. Abner then went on to win the final event of Advanced Warfare, MLG World Finals, with OpTic Gaming. He stated that the World Finals was the only event where he felt like he got carried, but it still marked Abner's and OpTic's most successful year by far. They won 9 championships, all 3 of the online Pro League Season, appeared in 10/11 Grand Finals, they won many online tournaments hosted by MLG and UMG, earned 1,651,320 pro points, and Abner had the most pro points out of any player with 447,975.

=== Call of Duty: Black Ops III (2015–2016 season) ===
Going into the Call of Duty: Black Ops III season Abner confirmed that OpTic Gaming would not be making any roster changes, like many other teams. OpTic Gaming went on to successfully qualify for the Call of Duty World League NA. OpTic gaming placed 2nd in the first event of the season, the "Totino's invitational", losing to Rise Nation in the final. After entering the next event with a top-4 seed, Abner and his team were met an even worse placing of 4–8 along with the other top-seeded teams, however the event suffered from technical difficulties leading to an apology from the event's management. Abner has won now two 25k tournaments hosted by UMG gaming and one 25k tournament hosted by ESL.

Alongside teammates Crimsix and FormaL, and Karma, Abner won the 2016 Call of Duty World League Stage One Finals Tournament of North America for Call of Duty: Black Ops III. The tournament was presented by PS4 with a grand prize of $250,000 for the winning team. Abner also won MLG Anaheim and MLG Orlando with OpTic Gaming.

=== Call of Duty: Infinite Warfare (2016–2017 season) ===
After competing at four Call of Duty World Championship events and failing to win first place at any, Abner achieved success at the 2017 Call of Duty World League Championship in the title of Call of Duty: Infinite Warfare. His team, Optic Gaming won first prize ($1.5 million) in the Call of Duty World League final.

=== Call of Duty: World War II (2017–2018 season) ===
Initially, Abner remained the leader of OpTic Gaming going into WWII. After inconsistent placings at numerous major events, the roster split up after a series of poor tournament placings, with Abner performing badly individually. They kicked FormaL and Karma and recruited players Sam 'Octane' Larew and Anthony 'Methodz' Zinni. But their problems weren't solved, as they placed 5–6th at the CWL Anaheim open, 7–8th at stage two playoffs and 17–24th in the 2018 Call of Duty Championship. This was the first time since Modern Warfare 2 that OpTic Gaming failed to win a single championship throughout a season.

=== Call of Duty: Black Ops 4 (2018–2019 season) ===
At the beginning of the Call of Duty: Black Ops 4 season Abner teamed up with Karma, Crimsix, TJHaly and Dashy, as this was the first year that competitive Call of Duty used a five-man roster. OpTic Gaming won the first Black ops 4 tournament, CWL Las Vegas 2018, bringing home $100,000. As of 2019 Abner has had the 5th highest earnings in Call of Duty history ($652,140).

=== Call of Duty: Modern Warfare (2019–2020 season) ===
Ahead of the 2019–2020 CDL season, Abner announced via his personal Twitter account that he had left OpTic Gaming. On October 24, 2019, it was announced by NRG Esports via its social media channels that Abner had joined its currently unnamed CDL franchise, which on October 30, 2019, would be named Chicago Huntsmen.

=== Call of Duty: Black Ops Cold War (2020–2021 season) ===
Ahead of the 2020-2021 CDL season, NRG Esports had acquired the OpTic Gaming brand and rebranded the Chicago Huntsmen into OpTic Chicago.

=== Call of Duty: Vanguard (2021–2022 season) ===
Ahead of the 2021-2022 CDL season, Abner joined the newly formed OpTic Texas after OpTic Gaming merged with Dallas Empire's partner organization Envy.

=== Call of Duty: Modern Warfare II (2022–2023 season) ===
Ahead of the 2022-2023 CDL season, Abner announced that the 2022-2023 CDL season would be his final season in the CDL but on January 17, 2023, Abner ultimately decided to retire during the season, marking the end of his 12-year career.

== Personal life ==
Abner was born on June 30, 1995, to Kristen and Shawn Abner, a retired professional baseball player. In 2013, he graduated from Cumberland Valley High School in Mechanicsburg, Pennsylvania. After retiring from competitive play, he focused on being a content creator and streamer for the Optic organization. In 2024, he was named the Esports Personality of the Year at the 2024 Esports Awards.

On August 15, 2025, Abner announced that he and his wife were expecting their first child together.

== Awards and nominations ==
Year	Ceremony	Category	Result	Ref.
2022	Forbes 30 Under 30	Games	Included	
2022	The Streamer Awards	Best FPS Streamer	Nominated	
2024	Esports Awards	Esports Personality of the Year	Won	

== Books ==
- Rodriguez, Hector; Haag, Matthew; Abner, Seth; Johnson, Will; Glassel, Ashley; Musselman, Ryan; Wyatt, Ryan (May 17, 2016). OpTic Gaming: The Making of eSports Champions. HarperCollins. ISBN 9780062449306.
