= Aches (gamer) =

American professional eSports player (born 1994)

ACHES
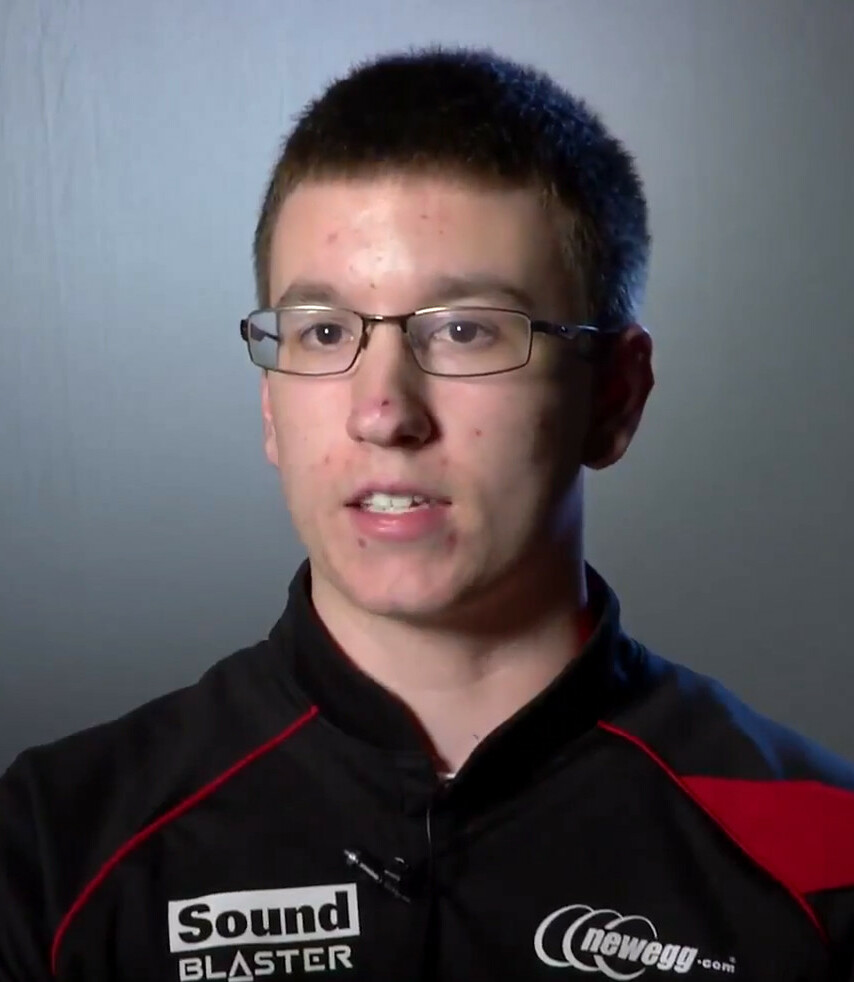
- Price in 2013

Personal information
- Name: Patrick Price
- Born: July 18, 1994 (age 32)
- Nationality: American

Career information
- Games: Call of Duty series
- Playing career: 2010–2022

Team history
- 2010–2011: Leverage
- 2012–2014: compLexity Gaming
- 2014: Evil Geniuses
- 2014–2015: FaZe Clan
- 2015–2016: Team EnVyUs
- 2016: compLexity
- 2016–2017: Cloud9
- 2017–2018: Evil Geniuses
- 2018–2019: Team EnVyUs
- 2019–2020: Los Angeles Guerrillas

Career highlights and awards
- 2× World League champion (2014, 2018)

Patrick Price (born July 18, 1994) known by his video game moniker ACHES, is an American former professional esports player. Price is best known for playing Call of Duty.

== Career ==
Price won the Call of Duty Championship 2014 with compLexity Gaming and the Call of Duty Championship 2018 with Evil Geniuses, making him one of only nine players to have won two or more Call of Duty Championships.

Price was suspended from MLG events for "repeated harassment" and prohibited from attending four games of the Call of Duty Pro League starting on August 6, 2016, and from participating in the July 27, 2016, MLG 2K Tournament.

Price officially retired from competitive Call of Duty on January 27, 2022. Along with his retirement, he announced that he was consulting with a studio for a new AAA video game, in addition to joining two Call of Duty League-based series, The Flank and Dexerto's Reverse Sweep.

On March 2, 2022, Price announced that he had joined the Ubisoft San Francisco Studio to work on their new title, XDefiant.

== Personal life ==
Price was born on July 18, 1994, to Lesa and BJ Price. He grew up in Sanford, North Carolina, and was a graduate of Southern Lee High School in 2012.

== Controversy ==
At UMG Chicago 2012, held in late December 2012 during the Call of Duty: Black Ops II competitive season, a heated moment unfolded between professional players Patrick "Aches" Price and Matthew "Nadeshot" Haag. During the Grand Final of the tournament, OpTic Gaming defeated Aches' team in a high-stakes match. As the game concluded, Nadeshot celebrated the victory energetically and reportedly stepped toward Aches’ side of the stage in the heat of the moment. In response, Aches physically shoved Nadeshot in a brief but tense altercation that quickly drew attention from event staff and other players. Though the push was minor and did not escalate further, the incident became one of the most talked-about moments in early Call of Duty esports history, symbolizing the intense rivalry between Aches' teams and OpTic Gaming. The event also helped solidify Aches’ role as a polarizing figure in the scene and added fuel to the ongoing feud between the two players.
