= Call of Duty Pro League =

Annual esports competition

Tournament information
- Sport: Call of Duty
- Location: Columbus, Ohio, United States
- Established: 2014
- Defunct: 2019
- Number of tournaments: Varies
- Teams: 16

The Call of Duty Pro League was an annual Call of Duty league held twice each season. To determine qualification, teams would play at other tournaments to gather Pro Points.

The inaugural league started in 2014 on Call of Duty: Ghosts for the Xbox 360 and was won by compLexity Gaming.

As with the Call of Duty World League, the Call of Duty Pro League was replaced by the franchised Call of Duty League from 2020 onwards.

== Results by year ==
Year	Game Version	Stage 1 Champions	Stage 2 Champions	Stage 3 Champions
2014	Ghosts	compLexity Gaming	Evil Geniuses	Team EnVyUs
2015	Advanced Warfare	OpTic Gaming	OpTic Gaming	FaZe Clan
2016	Black Ops III	OpTic Gaming	Team EnVyUs	N/A (Note: The Call of Duty Pro League only consisted of 2 stages during Black Ops III, Infinite Warfare and WWII)
2017	Infinite Warfare	Splyce	OpTic Gaming	N/A
2018	WWII	FaZe Clan	Team Kaliber	N/A
2019	Black Ops 4	eUnited	N/A	N/A
