= Karma (Call of Duty player) =

Canadian-American professional esports player

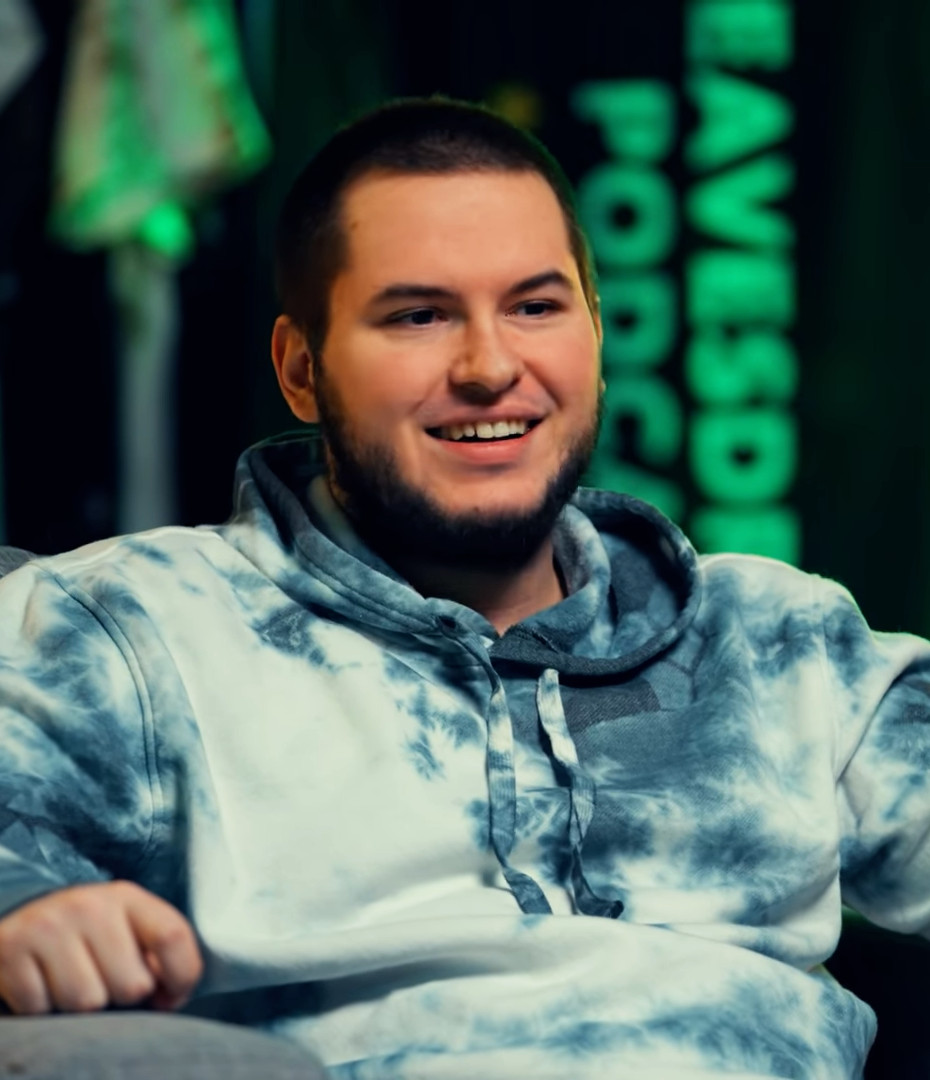
- Barlow in 2022

Personal information
- Name: Damon Barlow
- Nickname(s): Three Rings, DB4, DB5
- Born: 17 July 1994 (age 32)
- Nationality: Canadian American

Current team
- Team: OpTic Texas
- Role: Head coach
- Game: Call of Duty
- League: Call of Duty League

Career information
- Playing career: 2010–2020
- Coaching career: 2023–present

Team history

As player:
- 2011: Xtravagant
- 2012–2013: Fariko Impact
- 2013: Team EnVyUs
- 2013–2014: compLexity Gaming
- 2014: Evil Geniuses
- 2014: FaZe Clan
- 2014–2015: OpTic Nation
- 2015–2019: OpTic Gaming
- 2019–2020: Seattle Surge

As coach:
- 2023–present: OpTic Texas

Career highlights and awards
- As player: 3× Call of Duty Championship champion (2013, 2014, 2017); As coach: 2× Call of Duty League Championship champion (2024, 2025)

Damon Barlow, better known as Karma, is a Canadian-American professional Call of Duty coach and former player. He is currently the head coach for OpTic Texas. He is the first three-time Call of Duty Championship winner, winning back-to-back titles in 2013 & 2014, and also in 2017, with Fariko Impact, compLexity Gaming, and OpTic Gaming respectively. In 2024, he also joined James "Crowder" Crowder as the only two people to win a World Championship as a player and a head coach. He is also a Major League Gaming (MLG) X Games 2015 gold medalist, with OpTic Gaming. Karma joined OpTic replacing outgoing captain Matt "Nadeshot" Haag on the team. He is a naturalized American citizen. As of May 2020, Karma has won $815,087.25 from tournament winnings, making him the player to have earned the fifth most total prize money playing professional Call of Duty, and making him the player to have earned the fifth most total prize money playing any professional console game. He also runs an active YouTube channel.

== Career ==
=== Beginnings ===
Barlow began playing competitive Call of Duty in 2010. He first started playing Call of Duty during Call of Duty 4: Modern Warfare. He started showcasing what he was truly capable of with the release of Call of Duty: World at War, however, his skill went largely unnoticed due to the lack of support in the community of the game.

His first real chance to shine came with the release of Call of Duty: Black Ops. His first major event was MLG Columbus where he placed a decent 10th with his team yunGunZ. Going into the next event the team showed signs of improvement finishing 6th at MLG Anaheim. However, looking for more than just an average showing, he joined forces with the legendary Rambo under the Xtravagant name. Expecting to replicate the success the IXI name saw in the past, Karma and his teammates went into the rest of the season confident. However, it turned out to be much of the same with another 6th-place finish at MLG Orlando and a 5th-place finish at the season-end MLG National Championship 2011.

=== Breakthrough ===
Like many players, due to the lack of support, he chose to not compete during Call of Duty: Modern Warfare 3. With the release of Call of Duty: Black Ops II, he joined the newly formed team Fariko Impact coming in with great expectations. Following solid performances at the first two events, but not what the team was expecting, the roster got reshuffled. Going into the MLG Winter Championship in Dallas, Impact's roster consisted of Karma, Parasite, Killa, and Mirx. This is where both the team and Karma himself started reaching new levels. They ran through the competition and took the tournament win. This success continued into the next 3 events with the highlight being the Call of Duty Championship where Impact won the grand prize of $400,000. During this streak of wins, Karma became known as the best player in the game. However, the success came to a stop at the MLG Spring Championship where Impact finished 2nd. Hoping they could bring back the success they had previously seen, the team stuck together for another go during Gfinity 1. Unfortunately, it got worse, as the team finished a disappointing 4th. Before the team arrived back in the states, Karma left Impact and joined EnVyUs.

=== Team EnVyUs ===
Expectations skyrocketed immediately for the team with people expecting them to be capable of knocking compLexity off of their historic run. Unfortunately, this never happened as EnVyUs never achieved even a top 3 finish in the Black Ops 2 season. Going into the release of Call of Duty: Ghosts, EnVyUs still had high expectations of winning championships. At the first event of the season at MLG Fall Championship, the team once again came up well short of what was expected, finishing 6th. This was the last straw for Karma as he decided to make another team change. He left Envy and joined compLexity.

=== compLexity ===
The roster change by compLexity following a tournament win at the MLG Fall Championship was met with much criticism; however, Karma quickly proved why he is still considered one of the best in the game as the team won their first two events together at UMG Philadelphia and Call of Duty Championship 2014. Following the win at the biggest championship of the year, Karma along with the rest of the team cemented themselves as the clear favorites going into every event. At the next major LAN event at UGC Niagara, the team finally looked beatable falling to an amateur team, XGN, in the first round of the Championship Bracket. However, the Losers Bracket didn't scare them, as they went 21–2 in map count on Sunday to go all the way through the Losers bracket and win the tournament. Following the tournament, Karma and his teammates announced that they were joining Evil Geniuses.

=== Evil Geniuses ===
Following the switch over to Evil Geniuses, the team hoped to continue the same success. Unfortunately, they came up short at their very first event which was the MLG X Games Invitational. They took home a disappointing bronze medal. Despite the loss, the team was able to bounce back and win the International Playoff at the MLG Championship Anaheim losing only a combined 5 maps the entire event. Karma and the rest of the team hoped this would be a sign of more success for them. However, at Gfinity 3 the team lost to Team Kaliber in their group stage ensuring they can only have the second seed. They were placed in the Championship Bracket against FaZe who they would end up losing to, 3–0. The team had their worst placing to date finishing in the 5th-8th category. The next event was UMG Dallas but EG would not be attending due to Karma's wife giving birth and him wanting to stay at home with her. After Dallas, Karma announced that he was no longer happy with EG and would be leaving. After some speculation, it was announced that he was loaned to FaZe Clan for the remainder of the season but would remain on contract with Evil Geniuses. He later left Evil Geniuses after he complained on Twitter of being criticized for missing the Electronic Sports League Gamescom tournament for the birth of his daughter with wife Holly Barlow.

=== OpTic Gaming ===
Damon "Karma" Barlow, joined Optic gaming in 2014, with the roster of, Seth "Scump" Abner, Matthew "Formal" Piper, and Ian "Crimsix" Porter, they became the most dominant team throughout the jetpack era (Call of Duty: Advanced Warfare, Call of Duty: Black Ops 3, and Call of Duty: Infinite Warfare.) With the Optic Gaming roster, he won his third world championship. He has cemented himself as one of the greatest Call of Duty players of all time.

=== Seattle Surge ===
On June 3, 2020, Seattle Surge announced that Damon "Karma" Barlow had retired from competitive Call of Duty. Karma explained that he no longer enjoyed the game, specifically Modern Warfare, and thought his team could do better without him as he was "pretty bad."

== Coaching career ==
Damon "Karma" Barlow rejoined OpTic Texas as head coach in May 2023, ahead of Major 5 in the Call of Duty League season. Karma replaced then Head Coach Raymond "Rambo Ray" Lussier. Under Karma's leadership, OpTic Texas has won the Call of Duty League Championship in the 2024 & 2025.
