= Call of Duty Championship 2013 =

Esports competition

Tournament information
- Sport: Call of Duty: Black Ops 2
- Location: Los Angeles, California, U.S.
- Administrator: Activision, Electronic Sports League
- Tournament format: Pool Play to seed brackets then Double-Elimination.
- Purse: $1 million

Final positions
- Champions: Fariko Impact ( Adam “Killa” Sloss, Chris “Parasite” Duarte, Marcus "MiRx" Carter, Damon "Karma" Barlow)

The Call of Duty Championship 2013 was held from April 5–7, 2013 and was won by Fariko Impact with a roster of Adam “Killa” Sloss, Chris “Parasite” Duarte, Marcus “MiRx” Carter and Damon "Karma" Barlow over Team EnVyUs, with a roster of Tosh "StaiNViLLe" Mcgruder, Raymond "Rambo" Lussier, Jordan "JKap" Kaplan, Jordan "ProoFy" Cannon.

Call of Duty: Black Ops II is a first-person shooter video game.

== Placings ==
=== Top 8 ===
| Place | Team | Prize money |
|---|---|---|
| 1st | Fariko Impact | $400,000 |
| 2nd | Team EnVyUs | $200,000 |
| 3rd | OpTic Gaming | $120,000 |
| 4th | compLexity Gaming | $100,000 |
| 5th | Team FeaR | $70,000 |
| 6th | Epsilon eSports | $50,000 |
| 7th | vVv Gaming | $35,000 |
| 8th | inFerno eSports | $25,000 |

| Preceded by None | Call of Duty Championship | Succeeded by Call of Duty Championship 2014 |
