= Clayster =

American professional esports player

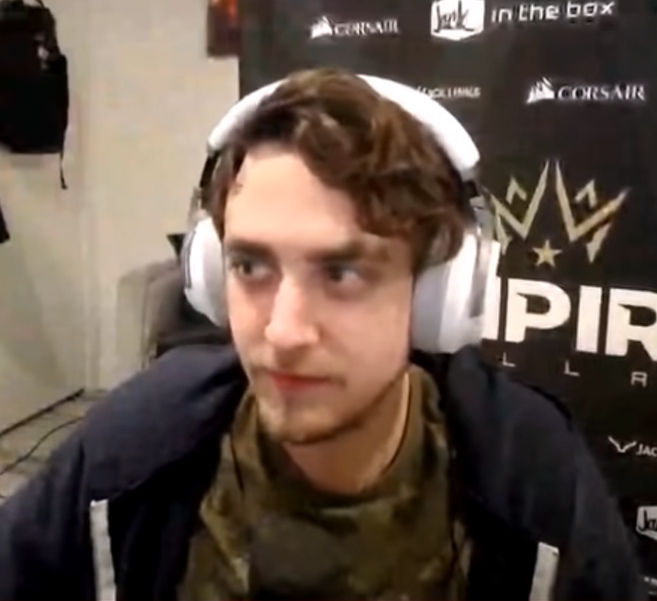
- Eubanks in 2020

Personal information
- Name: James Clayton Eubanks
- Nickname: Clay
- Born: May 7, 1992 (age 34)
- Nationality: American

Career information
- Game: Call of Duty
- Playing career: 2010?–2024
- Role: Head coach
- Coaching career: 2024–present

Team history

As player:
- 2015–2017: FaZe Clan
- 2017–2019: eUnited
- 2019–2020: Dallas Empire
- 2021–2022: New York Subliners
- 2022–2023: Las Vegas Legion
- 2023–2024: Carolina Royal Ravens

As coach:
- 2024–2025: Vegas Falcons (assistant)
- 2025–2026: Vegas / Riyadh Falcons

Career highlights and awards
- As player: 3× CWL/CDL champion (2015, 2019, 2020); CWL Championship MVP (2015); CWL Pro League champion (2019)

James Clayton Eubanks, better known as Clayster or Clay, is an American professional Call of Duty coach and former player who was most recently head coach for the Riyadh Falcons of the Call of Duty League (CDL). Eubanks is a three-time Call of Duty World Champion.

== Early life ==
Eubanks is from Winchester, Virginia, and attended West Virginia University. He is the son of former musician Jerry Eubanks.

== Career ==
Eubanks was the Major League Gaming (MLG) X Games 2014 gold medalist, playing with OpTic Gaming, and MVP of the Call of Duty Championship 2015, playing with Denial eSports. Eubanks went 1,400 days without a major win, until he and the eUnited squad won the finals of the 2019 CWL Pro League to clinch the 2019 league championship and end the drought.

He has played for RoughNeX, Thrust Nation, UNiTE Gaming, compLexity Gaming, Team Kaliber, OpTic Gaming, Team EnVyUs, Denial eSports, FaZe Clan, eUnited, Dallas Empire, New York Subliners, Las Vegas Legion, and Carolina Royal Ravens. On October 23, 2024, Eubanks announced his retirement from professional Call of Duty.

On November 14, 2024, Eubanks joined the Vegas Falcons as a coach. On March 17, 2025, Eubanks was promoted to head coach after LewTee's firing. He departed the Falcons on October 22, 2026.

Preceded by compLexity Gaming	Call of Duty Championship winner 2015; With: Denial eSports: Chris "Replays" Crowder; Dylan "Attach" Price; Jordan "JKap" Kaplan	Succeeded by Team EnVyUs
