= Call of Duty World League =

Series of Call of Duty esports tournaments

- Game: Call of Duty (Call of Duty: Black Ops III, Call of Duty: Infinite Warfare, Call of Duty: WWII, Call of Duty: Black Ops 4)
- Founded: 2016
- Folded: 2019
- Replaced by: Call of Duty League
- Continents: North America, Europe, Asia-Pacific, Brazil
- Sponsors: PlayStation 4 Scuf Gaming; Mountain Dew

The Call of Duty World League (CWL) was a series of Call of Duty esports tournaments that began in January 2016. At its most recent form, tournaments were played on Call of Duty: Black Ops 4 for PlayStation 4. A total of US$6 million of prize money were given out for the 2019 season.

The tournament series was discontinued in favor of the franchise-based Call of Duty League, which began in early 2020.

== Tournaments ==
The following list shows a list of all official tournaments which were a part of the Call of Duty World League.

=== Black Ops III ===
Tournament	Date	Winner	Prize Pool
Stage 1	12 January 2016 – 3 April 2016	OpTic Gaming	$250,000
Anaheim Open	10 June 2016 – 12 June 2016	OpTic Gaming	$100,000
Stage 2	19 April 2016 – 17 July 2016	Team EnVyUs	$250,000
Orlando Open	5 August 2016 – 7 August 2016	OpTic Gaming	$100,000
Championship	1 September 2016 – 3 September 2016	Team EnVyUs	$2,000,000

=== Infinite Warfare ===
Tournament	Date	Winner	Prize Pool
Las Vegas Open	16 December 2016 – 18 December 2016	Rise Nation	$100,000
London Invitational	26 January 2017 – 29 January 2017	Orbit eSports EU	$25,000
Atlanta Open	10 February 2017 – 12 February 2017	eUnited	$200,000
Paris Open	17 February 2017 – 19 February 2017	OpTic Gaming	$100,000
Sydney Open	3 March 2017 – 5 March 2017	Mindfreak	$30,000 AUD
Dallas Open	17 March 2017 – 19 March 2017	OpTic Gaming	$200,000
Birmingham Open	14 April 2017 – 16 April 2017	Epsilon eSports	$50,000
Stage 1	21 April 2017 – 28 May 2017	Splyce	$700,000
Sydney Open 2	12 May 2017 – 14 May 2017	Mindfreak	$30,000 AUD
Anaheim Open	16 June 2017 – 18 June 2017	Luminosity Gaming	$200,000
Sheffield Open	24 June 2017 – 24 June 2017	Epsilon eSports	$25,000
Stage 2	30 June 2017 – 30 July 2017	OpTic Gaming	$700,000
Championship	9 August 2017 – 13 August 2017	OpTic Gaming	$1,500,000

=== WWII ===
Tournament	Date	Winner	Prize Pool
Dallas Open	8 December 2017 – 10 December 2017	Team Kaliber	$200,000
New Orleans Open	12 January 2018 – 14 January 2018	Team Kaliber	$200,000
Stage 1	23 January 2018 – 8 April 2018	FaZe Clan	$700,000
Atlanta Open	9 March 2018 – 11 March 2018	Rise Nation	$200,000
Birmingham Open	30 March 2018 – 1 April 2018	Luminosity Gaming	$200,000
Seattle Open	20 April 2018 – 22 April 2018	Rise Nation	$200,000
Stage 2	15 May 2018 – 29 July 2018	Team Kaliber	$700,000
Anaheim Open	15 June 2018 – 17 June 2018	Rise Nation	$200,000
Championship	15 August 2018 – 19 August 2018	Evil Geniuses	$1,500,000

=== Black Ops 4 ===
Tournament	Date	Pro Circuit Winner	Pro Circuit Prize Pool	Amateur Circuit Winner	Amateur Circuit Prize Pool
Las Vegas	6–9 December 2018	OpTic Gaming	$250,000	N/A	
Fort Worth	15–17 March 2019	Luminosity Gaming	$325,000	FC Black	$75,000
London	3–5 May 2019	100 Thieves	$325,000	Mindfreak	$75,000
Anaheim	14–16 June 2019	100 Thieves	$325,000	Mindfreak	$75,000
Amateur Open	19–21 July 2019	N/A		The Bhoys	$150,000
CWL Pro League	4 February – 21 July 2019	eUnited	$2,400,000	N/A	
Championship	August 2019	eUnited	$2,000,000	N/A	
