= Call of Duty Championship 2016 =

Esports competition

Tournament information
- Sport: Call of Duty: Black Ops III
- Location: Inglewood, California, United States
- Dates: September 1, 2016–September 4, 2016
- Administrator: Activision
- Tournament format: Pool Play to seed brackets then Double-Elimination.
- Teams: 32

Final positions
- Champions: Team Envy
- MVP: Johnathon "John" Perez

Call of Duty Championship 2016 was a Call of Duty: Black Ops III on PlayStation 4 tournament that occurred on September 1–4, 2016.

It was won by Team EnVyUs with a team consisting of Austin "SlasheR" Liddicoat, Bryan "Apathy" Zhelyazkov, Johnathon "John" Perez, and Jordan "JKap" Kaplan.

The tournament was livestreamed online on Twitch.

== Format ==
- Group Stage
  - Best of 5 Series
  - Top 2 advance to Knockout Stage
  - Bottom 2 teams are eliminated
- Knockout Stage
  - Double Elimination
  - Best of 5 Series
  - Grand Finals
    - Team coming from the Losers Bracket must win two Best of 5 Series to claim victory.

=== Game Types and Maps ===
Included maps and modes:

- Hardpoint: Breach, Evac, Fringe, Stronghold
- Search and Destroy: Breach, Evac, Fringe, Hunted, Infection, Redwood, Stronghold
- Uplink: Breach, Evac, Fringe, Infection
- Capture the Flag: Breach, Evac, Fringe, Stronghold

== Qualified teams ==
32 teams from the North America, Europe and APAC regions will qualify for the tournament. 12 teams will qualify via total points gained from each stages playoffs of their individual regions in the 2016 Call of Duty Pro League. Another 20 teams will qualify via online qualifiers from each region.

=== Pro League Teams ===
The 12 teams which accumulated the most points from their individual regions 2016 Call of Duty Pro League playoffs were the first teams to qualify for the 2016 Call of Duty Championship.

North America
Team Envy
Rise Nation
Optic Gaming
Luminosity Gaming
FaZe Clan
Renegades

Europe
Splyce
HyperGames Team
Millenium
Team Infused

APAC
Mindfreak
Team Orbit

=== Online Qualifier teams ===
20 further teams qualified from their respective regions online qualifiers.

North America
Pnda Gaming
Team Kaliber
Complexity Gaming
Team Allegiance
Cloud9
Lethal Gaming
Elevate
Apotheon Esports
Most Wanted
eUnited

Europe
Black Forest Games
Epsilon Esports
Team Vitality
PuLse Gaming
Team-LDLC
Supremacy
Vodafone Giants
FAB Games eSports

APAC
Tainted Minds
Chiefs eSports Club

== Groups ==
Group A
Pos	Team	Series		Games		Qualification
1	Splyce	3–0	100%	9–2	82%	Bracket Play
2	Millenium	2–1	67%	7-4	64%	Bracket Play
3	eUnited	1–2	33%	4-6	46%	Eliminated
4	Black Forest Games	0–3	0%	1–9	10%	Eliminated

Group B
Pos	Team	Series		Games		Qualification
1	Rise Nation	3–0	100%	9–2	82%	Bracket Play
2	HyperGames Team	2–1	67%	6-3	67%	Bracket Play
3	Apotheon Esports	1–2	33%	5-7	42%	Eliminated
4	Supremacy	0–3	0%	1–9	10%	Eliminated

Group C
Pos	Team	Series		Games		Qualification
1	FAB Games eSports	3–0	100%	9–2	82%	Bracket Play
2	Luminosity Gaming	2-1	67%	6-5	55%	Bracket Play
3	Mindfreak	1–2	33%	5-7	42%	Eliminated
4	Chiefs eSports Club	0-3	0%	3-9	25%	Eliminated

Group D
Pos	Team	Series		Games		Qualification
1	Team Allegiance	3–0	100%	9–2	82%	Bracket Play
2	Epsilon Esports	2–1	67%	6–6	50%	Bracket Play
3	PuLse Gaming	1–2	33%	5-6	46%	Eliminated
4	Renegades	0–3	0%	3–9	25%	Eliminated

Group E
Pos	Team	Series		Games		Qualification
1	FaZe Clan	3-0	100%	9-0	100%	Bracket Play
2	Elevate	2–1	67%	6-3	67%	Bracket Play
3	Most Wanted	1-2	33%	3-8	27%	Eliminated
4	Vodafone Giants	0–3	0%	2–9	18%	Eliminated

Group F
Pos	Team	Series		Games		Qualification
1	Team Kaliber	3–0	100%	9–4	69%	Bracket Play
2	Team Infused	2–1	67%	8-6	57%	Bracket Play
3	Lethal Gaming	1–2	33%	5-7	42%	Eliminated
4	Tainted Minds	0–3	0%	4–9	31%	Eliminated

Group G
Pos	Team	Series		Games		Qualification
1	Team Envy	3–0	100%	9–3	75%	Bracket Play
2	Cloud9	2–1	67%	8-5	62%	Bracket Play
3	Team Orbit	1–2	33%	4-7	36%	Eliminated
4	Team Vitality	0–3	0%	3–9	25%	Eliminated

Group H
Pos	Team	Series		Games		Qualification
1	Complexity Gaming	3-0	100%	9-5	64%	Bracket Play
2	Optic Gaming	2–1	67%	8–4	67%	Bracket Play
3	Pnda Gaming	1-2	33%	5-6	46%	Eliminated
4	Team=LDLC	0–3	0%	2–9	18%	Eliminated

== Final standings ==
Place	Team	Prize money
1st	Team Envy	$800,000
2nd	Splyce	$250,000
3rd	Elevate	$150,000
4th	FAB Games eSports	$120,000
5th-6th	Cloud9	$70,000
5th-6th	Rise Nation	$70,000
7th-8th	FaZe Clan	$50,000
7th-8th	Optic Gaming	$50,000
9th-12th	HyperGames Team	$30,000
9th-12th	Luminosity Gaming	$30,000
9th-12th	Millenium	$30,000
9th-12th	Team Kaliber	$30,000
13th-16th	compLexity Gaming	$20,000
13th-16th	Epsilon Esports	$20,000
13th-16th	Team Allegiance	$20,000
13th-16th	Team Infused	$20,000
17th-24th	Apotheon Esports	$15,000
17th-24th	eUnited	$15,000
17th-24th	Lethal Gaming	$15,000
17th-24th	Mindfreak	$15,000
17th-24th	Most Wanted	$15,000
17th-24th	Pnda Gaming	$15,000
17th-24th	PuLse Gaming	$15,000
17th-24th	Team Orbit	$15,000
25th-32nd	Black Forest Games	$15,000
25th-32nd	Chiefs eSports Club	$15,000
25th-32nd	Vodafone Giants	$15,000
25th-32nd	Renegades	$15,000
25th-32nd	Supremacy	$15,000
25th-32nd	Tainted Minds	$15,000
25th-32nd	Team-LDLC	$15,000
25th-32nd	Team Vitality	$15,000

Preceded by Call of Duty Championship 2015	Call of Duty Championship	Succeeded by Call of Duty Championship 2017
