= Call of Duty Championship =

Annual Call of Duty tournament

Tournament information
- Sport: Call of Duty
- Location: Burbank, California, United States
- Month played: August
- Established: 2013
- Number of tournaments: Annual
- Teams: 8
- Most championships: OpTic (3 titles) EnVyUs\Empire (2 titles)

Current champion
- OpTic Texas

The Call of Duty Championship is an annual Call of Duty tournament held at the end of each competitive season to determine the year's World Champion. To determine qualification, teams must qualify through events before the World Championship. Players must be at least 18 years of age as of the beginning of the tournament in order to participate.

== History ==
The inaugural tournament was first held in 2013 on Call of Duty: Black Ops II for the Xbox 360 and was won by Fariko Impact. In 2014, playing Call of Duty: Ghosts, Complexity Gaming won the $400,000 championship prize.

The 2015 iteration of the event was won by Denial eSports with team consisting of Chris "Replays" Crowder, Dillon "Attach" Price, James "Clayster" Eubanks, and Jordan "JKap" Kaplan.

The 2016 iteration occurred 2–4 September 2016, unlike previous ones held in the spring, with a two million dollar prize pool. It was announced on June 8, 2016, that the championship will take place along with Call of Duty XP which will reveal the Infinite Warfare Multiplayer Trailer. Team EnvyUs won the event, with a line-up of JKap, SlasheR, Apathy, and John (who was named MVP of the event).

In 2020, Activision and Sony Mobile announced the inaugural Call of Duty: Mobile Championship would begin on April 30. However, in December, Activision canceled the Mobile Grand Finals due to the COVID-19 pandemic, and distributed the $750,000 prize pool between the seven teams who qualified for the Finals.

The 2021 Call of Duty League season began January 23, 2021. In April 2021, Activision announced the 2021 Call of Duty: Mobile Championship would begin on June 3.

== Championship breakdown ==
Year	Game Version	Venue (location)	Champions (roster)	Runner-ups (roster)	Third place (roster)	Fourth place (roster)
2013	Black Ops II	Hollywood Palladium (Hollywood, California)	Fariko Impact (Karma, KiLLa, MiRx, Parasite)	Team EnVyUs (JKap, ProoFy, Rambo, StaiNViLLe)	OpTic Gaming (BigTymeR, MerK, Scump, NaDeSHoT)	CompLexity Gaming (ACHES, C6, TeePee, TuQuick)
2014	Ghosts	Los Angeles Convention Center (Los Angeles, California)	CompLexity Gaming (ACHES, C6, Karma, TeePee)	Team EnVyUs (MerK, NAMELESS, Rambo, StuDyy)	OpTic Gaming (Clayster, MBoZe, NaDeSHoT, Scump)	Strictly Business (Apathy, Censor, Dedo, Saints)
2015	Advanced Warfare	Los Angeles Convention Center (Los Angeles, California)	Denial eSports (Attach, Clayster, JKap, Replays)	Team Revenge (AquA, Faccento, Nagafen, Remy)	FaZe Red (ACHES, Enable, Parasite, SlasheR)	Prophecy (Classic, MBoZe, Mochila, Censor)
2016	Black Ops III	Great Western Forum (Inglewood, California)	Team EnVyUs (Apathy, JKap, John, SlasheR)	Splyce (Bance, Joee, Joshh, Rated)	Team eLevate (Aqua, Faccento, Felony, Nagafen)	Fab Games (Desire, Dqvee, Hawqeh, Vortex)
2017	Infinite Warfare	Amway Center (Orlando, Florida)	OpTic Gaming (Crimsix, FormaL, Karma, Scump)	Team EnVyUs (Apathy, Jkap, John, SlasheR)	Luminosity Gaming (Classic, Octane, Saints, Slacked)	Rise Nation (Aqua, Faccento, FeLony, Loony)
2018	WW2	Nationwide Arena (Columbus, Ohio)	Evil Geniuses (ACHES, Apathy, Assault, SiLLY)	Team Kaliber (Accuracy, Kenny, Fero, Enable)	FaZe Clan (ZooMaa, Attach, Replays, Priestahh)	eUnited (Arcitys, Prestinni, Clayster, FeLonY)
2019	Black Ops 4	Pauley Pavilion (Los Angeles, California)	eUnited (Arcitys, aBeZy, Clayster, Prestinni, Simp)	100 Thieves (Octane, SlasheR, Kenny, Enable, Priestahh)	Optic Gaming (Scump, crimsix, Karma, TJHaLy, Dashy)	Enigma6 Group (KiSMET, General, Breszy, GodRx, Mayhem)
2020	Modern Warfare	Online	Dallas Empire (C6, Clayster, Huke, iLLeY, Shotzzy)	Atlanta FaZe (aBeZy, Cellium, MajorManiak, Priestahh, Simp)	Chicago Huntsmen (Arcitys, Envoy, Formal, Prestinni, Scump)	London Royal Ravens (Dylan, Seany, Skrapz, wuskin, Zer0)
2021	Black Ops Cold War	Galen Center (Los Angeles, California)	Atlanta FaZe (aBeZy, Arcitys, Cellium, Simp)	Toronto Ultra (Bance, Cammy, CleanX, Insight)	Dallas Empire (C6, iLLeY, Shotzzy, Vivid)	Minnesota RØKKR (Attach, Priestahh, MajorManiak, Standy)
2022	Vanguard	Galen Center (Los Angeles, California)	Los Angeles Thieves (Drazah, Envoy, Kenny, Octane)	Atlanta FaZe (aBeZy, Arcitys, Cellium, Simp)	Seattle Surge (Accuracy, Mack, Pred, Sib)	OpTic Texas (Dashy, iLLeY, Scump, Shotzzy)
2023	Modern Warfare II	Thomas & Mack Center (Paradise, Nevada)	New York Subliners (HyDra, KiSMET, Skyz, Priestahh)	Toronto Ultra (CleanX, Insight, Scrappy, Hicksy)	Atlanta FaZe (aBeZy, Cellium, Simp, SlasheR)	Seattle Surge (Accuracy, Mack, Sib, Pred)
2024	Modern Warfare III	Credit Union of Texas Event Center (Allen, Texas)	OpTic Texas (Kenny, Shotzzy, Pred, Dashy)	New York Subliners (HyDra, KiSMET, Skyz, Sib)	Toronto Ultra (CleanX, Insight, Scrappy, Envoy)	Los Angeles Thieves (Ghosty, Kremp, JoeDeceives, Nastie)
2025	Black Ops 6	Kitchener Memorial Auditorium Complex (Kitchener, Ontario, Canada)	OpTic Texas (Shotzzy, Dashy, Huke, Mercules)	Vancouver Surge (Abuzah, 04, Nastie, Neptune)	Boston Breach (Snoopy, Cammy, Owakening, Purj)	Miami Heretics (MettalZ, ReeaL, RenKoR, SupeR)
2026	Black Ops 7	Michelob Ultra Arena (Las Vegas, Nevada)	FaZe Vegas (Simp, 04, Drazah, Abuzah)	OpTic Texas (Shotzzy, Dashy, Huke, Mercules)	Riyadh Falcons (Cellium, Alluka, Kismet, Exnid)	Paris Gentle Mates (Ghosty, Sib, Estreal, JoeDeceives)
