= 2018 CWL Pro League =

Esports competition

- 2018

Tournament information
- Sport: Call of Duty: WWII
- Location: Columbus, Ohio, United States
- Dates: January 23, 2018–July 29, 2018
- Administrator: Activision
- Purse: $1,400,000

The 2018 CWL Pro League was a Call of Duty: WWII tournament on PlayStation 4 that occurred on January 23-July 29, 2018.

== Format ==
The 2018 CWL Global Pro League consisted of 2 Stages, with 16 teams from North America, Europe and the APAC region participating. The 16 teams were split into 2 different Divisions with the top 4 teams from each Division advancing to playoffs. The top 6 teams from each pool advanced to Stage 2, while the bottom 2 teams from each Division have to go to the relegation playoffs.

== Stage 1 ==
A total of $700,000 prize money will be given out during Stage 1. All 16 teams will receive $12,500 for participating while the 8 teams which qualified for playoffs will play for another $500,000.

=== Calendar ===
Round	Dates
Division A	23–25 January 2018
Division A	30 January – 1 February 2018
Division A	20–22 February 2018
Division A	27 February – 1 March 2018
Division B	6–8 February 2018
Division B	13–15 February 2018
Division B	14–16 March 2018
Division B	20–22 March 2018
Playoffs	6–8 April 2018

=== Division A ===
Week 1 of Division A took place from January 23, 2018, until February 1, 2018, with week 2 taking place from February 20, 2018, until March 1, 2018.

Pos	Team	Series	Games	Qualification
1	Rise Nation	13–1	40–12	Playoffs and Stage 2
2	OpTic Gaming	10–4	34–20	Playoffs and Stage 2
3	Red Reserve	9–5	34–23	Playoffs and Stage 2
4	Team Kaliber	8–6	30–28	Playoffs and Stage 2
5	Echo Fox	6–8	27–29	Stage 2
6	eRa Eternity	5–9	23–33	Stage 2
7	Mindfreak	4–10	22–34	Relegation playoffs
8	Team Vitality	1–13	10–41	Relegation playoffs

=== Division B ===
Week 1 of Division B took place from February 6, 2018, until February 15, 2018, with week 2 taking place from March 14, 2018, until March 22, 2018.

Pos	Team	Series	Games	Qualification
1	FaZe Clan	11–3	38–16	Playoffs and Stage 2
2	Luminosity Gaming	10–4	36–20	Playoffs and Stage 2
3	Team EnVyUs	8–6	27–27	Playoffs and Stage 2
4	eUnited (Note: eUnited won the tiebreaker against UNILAD based on head-to-head map count, which was 5-4 in their favor.)	7–7	28–27	Playoffs and Stage 2
5	UNILAD	7–7	29–30	Stage 2
6	Splyce	6–8	27–28	Stage 2
7	Evil Geniuses	5–9	21–33	Relegation playoffs
8	Epsilon eSports	2–12	14–39	Relegation playoffs

=== Playoffs final standings ===
Place	Team	Prize money
1st	FaZe Clan	$212,500
2nd	OpTic Gaming	$132,500
3rd	Luminosity Gaming	$92,500
4th	Team Kaliber	$52,500
5th-6th	Red Reserve	$32,500
5th-6th	eUnited	$32,500
7th-8th	Rise Nation	$22,500
7th-8th	Team EnVyUs	$22,500

== Relegation ==
The 4 bottom teams from Stage 1 participated in the relegation tournament against 4 other teams in a double-elimination bracket for the final 4 spots in Stage 2.

Participating teams:

- Mindfreak (Division A #7)
- Team Vitality (Division A #8)
- Evil Geniuses (Division B #7)
- Epsilon eSports (Division B #8)
- EZG eSports (North America Qualifier #1)
- GGEA Orange (North America Qualifier #2)
- Nordic (Europe Qualifier #1)
- Tainted Minds (APAC Qualifier winner)

=== Roster changes ===
Teams which placed among the bottom 2 teams in their Division during Stage 1 have until 6pm ET on April 13, 2018, to submit a roster and were allowed to replace 2 players.

Team	Player left	Player joined
Evil Geniuses	Nameless	SiLLY
Evil Geniuses	Enable	Assault
Epsilon eSports	Nathan	Reedy
Team Vitality	Zayrox	MarkyB
Team Vitality	RiskiN	Moose

=== Final standings ===
The top 4 teams qualified for Stage 2 of the 2018 CWL Pro League.

Place	Team
1st/2nd	Mindfreak
1st/2nd	Evil Geniuses
3rd/4th	Epsilon eSports
3rd/4th	Tainted Minds
5th-6th	GGEA Orange
5th-6th	Team Vitality
7th-8th	EZG eSports
7th-8th	Nordic

== Stage 2 ==
AA total of $700,000 prize money will be given out during Stage 2. All 16 teams will receive $12,500 for participating while the 8 teams which qualified for playoffs will play for another $500,000. The top 6 teams from all Stage 1 groups and the 4 teams which qualified via the relegation tournament participated in Stage 2. All 16 teams also qualified for the 2018 Call of Duty Championship.

Participating teams:

- Rise Nation (Division A #1)
- OpTic Gaming (Division A #2)
- Red Reserve (Division A #3)
- Team Kaliber (Division A #4)
- Echo Fox (Division A #5)
- compLexity Gaming (Division A #6) (Note: compLexity Gaming acquired the 2 players left on the eRa Eternity roster and their spot in the league.)
- FaZe Clan (Division B #1)
- Luminosity Gaming (Division B #2)
- Team EnVyUs (Division B #3)
- eUnited (Division B #4)
- UNILAD (Division B #5)
- Splyce (Division B #6)
- Mindfreak (Relegation 1st)
- Evil Geniuses (Relegation 2nd)
- Epsilon eSports (Relegation 3rd)
- Tainted Minds (Relegation 4th)

=== Roster changes ===
Teams which placed among the top 6 teams in their Division during Stage 1 have until 6pm ET on May 7, 2018, to submit a roster and were allowed to replace 2 players. Teams which placed among the bottom 2 teams in their Division during Stage 1 have until 6pm ET on April 13, 2018, to submit a roster and were allowed to replace 2 players.

Team	Player left	Player joined
Team EnVyUs	SlasheR	Chino
Team EnVyUs	Temp	Decemate
compLexity Gaming (Note: compLexity Gaming acquired the 2 players left on the eRa Eternity roster and their spot in the league.)	Ferocitys	Censor
compLexity Gaming	Decemate	Dashy
Rise Nation	Methodz	SlasheR
Team Kaliber	Theory	Ferocitys
Team Kaliber	Chino	Enable
eUnited	SiLLY	FeLo
Echo Fox	Assault	Temp
Luminosity Gaming	Octane	Formal
OpTic Gaming	Formal	Methodz
OpTic Gaming	Karma	Octane
Splyce	Tommey	Joshh
UNILAD	Moose	Alexx
UNILAD	Skrapz	Zed
Red Reserve	Joshh	Skrapz

=== Calendar ===
Round	Dates
Division A	15–17 May 2018
Division A	22–24 May 2018
Division A	26–28 June 2018
Division A	3–6 July 2018
Division B	29–31 May 2018
Division B	5–7 June 2018
Division B	10–12 July 2018
Division B	17–19 July 2018
Playoffs	27–29 July 2018

=== Division A ===
Pos	Team	Series	Games	Qualification
1	Red Reserve	11–3	38–21	Playoffs
2	Team Kaliber (Note: Team Kaliber holds the tiebreaker against Echo Fox based on overall map win percentage, Team Kaliber's is 59% while Echo Fox's is 53%)	9–5	33–23	Playoffs
3	Echo Fox	9–5	31–27	Playoffs
4	FaZe Clan	8–6	30–23	Playoffs
5	Evil Geniuses	7–7	29–26	
6	Team EnVyUs	6–8	28–28	
7	Splyce	5–9	21–33	
8	Epsilon eSports	1–13	11–40	

=== Division B ===
Pos	Team	Series	Games	Qualification
1	OpTic Gaming (Note: OpTic Gaming holds the tiebreak against eUnited and UNILAD based on head-to-head series record. OpTic has a head-to-head series record of 3–1, eUnited has a head-to-head series record of 2–2 while UNILAD has a head-to-head series record of 1–3)	10–4	35–21	Playoffs
2	eUnited	10–4	38–22	Playoffs
3	UNILAD	10–4	33–22	Playoffs
4	Rise Nation	9–5	33–23	Playoffs
5	Luminosity Gaming (Note: Luminosity Gaming holds the tiebreak against compLexity Gaming based on over map win percentage. Luminosity Gaming has a map win percentage of 48% while compLexity Gaming has a map win percentage of 44%)	6–8	27–29	
6	compLexity Gaming	6–8	24–27	
7	Mindfreak	4–10	22–37	
8	Tainted Minds	1–13	13–41	

=== Playoffs qualified teams ===
Team	Division
Red Reserve	Division A #1
Team Kaliber	Division A #2
Echo Fox	Division A #3
FaZe Clan	Division A #4
OpTic Gaming	Division B #1
eUnited	Division B #2
UNILAD	Division B #3
Rise Nation	Division B #4

=== Playoffs Bracket ===
Round 1	Round 2	Round 3	Grand Final
A1	Red Reserve	1
B4	Rise Nation	3
B4	Rise Nation	3
B2	eUnited	1
B2	eUnited	3
A3	Echo Fox	1
B4	Rise Nation	1
A2	Team Kaliber	3
A2	Team Kaliber	3
B3	UNILAD	1
A2	Team Kaliber	3
A4	FaZe Clan	0
B1	OpTic Gaming	2
A4	FaZe Clan	3	A2	Team Kaliber	2	3
B4	Rise Nation	3	1
Lower round 1	Lower round 2	Lower round 3	Lower final
A4	FaZe Clan	1
A1	Red Reserve	3	A1	Red Reserve	3	B4	Rise Nation	3
A3	Echo Fox	2	A1	Red Reserve	3	A1	Red Reserve	1
B2	eUnited	1
B2	eUnited	3
B3	UNILAD	3	B3	UNILAD	1
B1	OpTic Gaming	0

=== Playoffs final standings ===
Place	Team	Prize money
1st	Team Kaliber	$212,500
2nd	Rise Nation	$132,500
3rd	Red Reserve	$92,500
4th	eUnited	$52,500
5th-6th	FaZe Clan	$32,500
5th-6th	UNILAD	$32,500
7th-8th	OpTic Gaming	$22,500
7th-8th	Echo Fox	$22,500
