= Call of Duty Championship 2014 =

Esports competition

- 2014

Tournament information
- Sport: Call of Duty: Ghosts
- Location: Los Angeles, California, United States
- Administrator: Activision
- Tournament format: Pool Play to seed brackets then Double-Elimination.
- Teams: 32
- Purse: 1,000,000

The Call of Duty Championship 2014 was a Call of Duty: Ghosts tournament that occurred on March 28–30, 2014. It was the second annual iteration of the event.

Qualifying took place through online tournaments and live regional finals that ran from late February and early March in Australia, the U.K. and the U.S.

compLexity Gaming won the tournament with a roster of Patrick "ACHES" Price, TeePee, Crimsix, Damon "Karma" Barlow after beating Team EnVyUs, MerK, Rambo, NameLeSs, StuDyy, 3–0 in the finals. Those two teams and also third place OpTic Gaming received invitations to the Call of Duty tournament at the X Games Austin 2015.

The tournament was livestreamed online on MLG.tv.

== Placings ==
=== Top 8 ===
Place	Team	Prize money
1st	Complexity Gaming	$400.000
2nd	Team EnVyUs	$200,000
3rd	OpTic Gaming	$120,000
4th	Strictly Business	$100,000
5th	Trident Dotters	$70,000
6th	FaZe Clan	$50,000
7th	The Rise Nation	$35,000
8th	VexX Revenge	$25,000

Preceded by Call of Duty Championship 2013	Call of Duty Championship	Succeeded by Call of Duty Championship 2015
