= Call of Duty Championship 2017 =

Esports competition

- 2017

Tournament information
- Sport: Call of Duty: Infinite Warfare
- Location: Orlando, Florida, United States
- Dates: August 9, 2017–August 13, 2017
- Administrator: Activision
- Tournament format: Pool Play to seed brackets then Double-Elimination.
- Teams: 32

Final positions
- Champions: OpTic Gaming
- MVP: Matthew "FormaL" Piper

The Call of Duty Championship 2017 was a Call of Duty: Infinite Warfare tournament on PlayStation 4 that occurred on August 9–13, 2017.

The tournament was won by OpTic Gaming with a team consisting of Seth "Scump" Abner, Matthew "FormaL" Piper, Ian "Crimsix" Porter and Damon "Karma" Barlow.

The tournament was livestreamed online on Twitch, YouTube and MLG.tv.

== Format ==
- Group Stage
  - Best of 5 Series
  - Top 2 advance to Knockout Stage
  - Bottom 2 teams are eliminated
- Knockout Stage
  - Double Elimination
  - Best of 5 Series
  - Grand Finals
    - Team coming from the Losers Bracket must win two Best of 5 Series to claim victory.

=== Game Types and Maps ===
Included maps and modes:

- Hardpoint: Breakout, Frost, Mayday, Precinct, Scorch, Throwback
- Search and Destroy: Crusher, Frost, Mayday, Retaliation, Scorch, Throwback
- Uplink: Frost, Mayday, Precinct, Throwback

== Last Chance Qualifier ==
The last chance qualifier for this year's edition of the tournament was split up in to 3 regions North America, Europe and Asia-Pacific. Each region will hold an offline qualifier with 16 teams invited with invitations based on pro points standings and a varied amount of qualifying spots available. They are as follows:

- North America - 8 Qualifying spots available
- Europe - 6 Qualifying spots available
- APAC - 2 Qualifying spots available

=== Last Chance Qualifier teams ===
North America
Projekt Evil
Team Allegiance
3sUP
Team Kaliber
Echo Fox
Str8 Rippin
Lethal Gaming
Pnda Gaming
Rogue
Fury Gaming
Amity Esports
Fallen Godz
Havok eSports
InControl Gaming
Edax Pro
Precision eSports

Europe
Millenium
Team Infused
Supremacy
Team Vitality
Team MRN Black
Aerox eSports
Opulent eSports
eRa Eternity EU
Team MRN
StrokeUnit Gaming
Bulldog eSports
CRYPTICK GAMiNG
Eraiize Gaming
U4X eSports
Team Prismatic
dZResurges

APAC
Tainted Minds
Mindfreak.Black
Taboo
SYF Gaming
eRa Eternity ANZ
Awafi
Validate eSports
Empyre eSports
Sleeper Gaming
Node
frontline Esport
Senix eSports
FourTold
Real PlanB Hours
Victrix eSports
Rapid eSports

^ Teams are listed by their pro points standings.

== Qualified teams ==
32 teams from the North America, Europe and APAC regions will qualify for the tournament. The 16 teams which qualified for Stage 2 of the 2017 CWL Pro League were the first teams to qualify. Another 16 teams will qualify via the last chance qualifier.

=== Pro League Teams ===
The 16 teams which qualified for Stage 2 of the 2017 CWL Pro League were the first teams to qualify for the 2018 Call of Duty Championship.

North America
OpTic Gaming
Team Envy
eUnited
Luminosity Gaming
FaZe Clan
Enigma6 Group
Evil Geniuses
Ghost Gaming
Cloud9
Rise Nation

Europe
Fnatic
Splyce
Red Reserve
Elevate
Epsilon eSports

APAC
Mindfreak

=== Last Chance Qualifier teams ===
16 further teams qualified from their respective regions last chance qualifiers.

North America
3sUP
Echo Fox
Lethal Gaming
Projekt Evil
Rogue
Str8 Rippin
Team Allegiance
Team Kaliber

Europe
Team Infused
Team Vitality
eRa Eternity EU
Team MRN Black
Supremacy
Millenium

APAC
Tainted Minds
Mindfreak.Black

== Groups ==
Group A
Pos	Team	Series		Games		Qualification
1	Optic Gaming	3–0	100%	9–1	90%	Bracket Play
2	Epsilon Esports	2–1	67%	6-3	67%	Bracket Play
3	Echo Fox	1–2	33%	4-8	33%	Eliminated
4	3sUP	0–3	0%	2–9	18%	Eliminated

Group B
Pos	Team	Series		Games		Qualification
1	Team Envy	3–0	100%	9–1	90%	Bracket Play
2	Mindfreak.Black	2–1	67%	7-6	54%	Bracket Play
3	Elevate	1–2	33%	4-7	36%	Eliminated
4	Projekt Evil	0–3	0%	3–9	25%	Eliminated

Group C
Pos	Team	Series		Games		Qualification
1	eUnited	3–0	100%	9–0	100%	Bracket Play
2	Team Infused (Note: Team Infused, Mindfreak and Lethal Gaming were locked in a three-way tie. Based on head-to-head games record, Team Infused finished 1st in the tiebreaker with a 2-0 game record, Mindfreak finished 2nd with a 1-1 map record and Lethal Gaming finished 3rd with a 1-1 map record.)	1-2	33%	4-7	36%	Bracket Play
3	Mindfreak	1–2	33%	4-7	36%	Eliminated
4	Lethal Gaming	1–2	33%	4-7	36%	Eliminated

Group D
Pos	Team	Series		Games		Qualification
1	Rise Nation	3–0	100%	9–1	90%	Bracket Play
2	Luminosity Gaming	2–1	67%	6–4	60%	Bracket Play
3	Supremacy	1–2	33%	3-8	27%	Eliminated
4	Team Vitality	0–3	0%	4–9	31%	Eliminated

Group E
Pos	Team	Series		Games		Qualification
1	FaZe Clan	2-1	67%	8-4	67%	Bracket Play
2	Team Allegiance	2–1	67%	7–5	58%	Bracket Play
3	Red Reserve	2-1	67%	7-5	58%	Eliminated
4	eRa Eternity EU	0–3	0%	1–9	10%	Eliminated

Group F
Pos	Team	Series		Games		Qualification
1	Fnatic	3–0	100%	9–3	75%	Bracket Play
2	Str8 Rippin	2–1	67%	7–3	70%	Bracket Play
3	Tainted Minds	1–2	33%	5-8	38%	Eliminated
4	Evil Geniuses	0–3	0%	2–9	18%	Eliminated

Group G
Pos	Team	Series		Games		Qualification
1	Ghost Gaming	3–0	100%	9–4	69%	Bracket Play
2	Splyce	2–1	67%	7-5	58%	Bracket Play
3	Millenium	1–2	33%	5-7	42%	Eliminated
4	Team Kaliber	0–3	0%	4–9	31%	Eliminated

Group H
Pos	Team	Series		Games		Qualification
1	Enigma6 Group	3-0	100%	9-2	82%	Bracket Play
2	Cloud9	2–1	67%	7–4	64%	Bracket Play
3	Rogue	1-2	33%	5-7	42%	Eliminated
4	Team MRN Black	0–3	0%	1–9	10%	Eliminated

== Final standings ==
Place	Team	Prize money
1st	Optic Gaming	$600,000
2nd	Team Envy	$200,000
3rd	Luminosity Gaming	$100,000
4th	Rise Nation	$80,000
5th-6th	FaZe Clan	$55,000
5th-6th	eUnited	$55,000
7th-8th	Ghost Gaming	$35,000
7th-8th	Splyce	$35,000
9th-12th	Enigma6 Group	$25,000
9th-12th	Team Allegiance	$25,000
9th-12th	Team Infused	$25,000
9th-12th	Epsilon Esports	$25,000
13th-16th	Mindfreak.Black	$15,000
13th-16th	Str8 Rippin	$15,000
13th-16th	Fnatic	$15,000
13th-16th	Cloud9	$15,000
17th-24th	Echo Fox	$12,500
17th-24th	Elevate	$12,500
17th-24th	Mindfreak	$12,500
17th-24th	Supremacy	$12,500
17th-24th	Red Reserve	$12,500
17th-24th	Tainted Minds	$12,500
17th-24th	Millenium	$12,500
17th-24th	Rogue	$12,500
25th-32nd	3sUP	$10,000
25th-32nd	Projekt Evil	$10,000
25th-32nd	Lethal Gaming	$10,000
25th-32nd	Team Vitality	$10,000
25th-32nd	eRa Eternity EU	$10,000
25th-32nd	Evil Geniuses	$10,000
25th-32nd	Team Kaliber	$10,000
25th-32nd	Team MRN Black	$10,000

Preceded by Call of Duty Championship 2016	Call of Duty Championship	Succeeded by Call of Duty Championship 2018
