= Call of Duty Championship 2015 =

Esports competition

- 2015

Tournament information
- Sport: Call of Duty:Advanced Warfare
- Location: Los Angeles, California, United States
- Dates: March 27, 2015–March 29, 2015
- Administrator: Activision
- Tournament format: Pool Play to seed brackets then Double-Elimination.
- Teams: 32

Final positions
- Champions: Denial eSports
- MVP: Clayster

Call of Duty Championship 2015 was a Call of Duty: Advanced Warfare on Xbox One tournament that occurred on March 27–29, 2015.

It was won by Denial eSports with a team consisting of Chris "Replays" Crowder, Dillon "Attach" Price, James "Clayster" Eubanks, and Jordan "JKap" Kaplan. Clayster was named most valuable player of the event.

The tournament was livestreamed online on MLG.tv.

== Format ==
Group Play

- 8 groups of 4 teams
- Teams played every other team once in a best of 5
- Top 2 teams in each group advanced to the playoffs
  - In case of tie, head-to-head results will determine who advances
  - If 3 teams were tied and the head-to-head is inconclusive, a single sudden death game will determine who advances

Playoffs

- The games were best of 5.
- Winners continue on in the Upper Bracket.
- Losers dropped down to Lower Bracket
  - A loss in the losers bracket results in elimination

Note: Matches were to be played to determine 3rd-8th placements

Game Types and Maps

- Hardpoint: Bio Lab, Detroit, Solar, Retreat
- Search and Destroy: Bio Lab, Detroit, Drift, Recovery, Riot, Solar, Terrace
- Uplink: Bio Lab, Comeback, Detroit
- Capture the Flag: Ascend, Bio Lab, Detroit, Retreat

== Qualified teams ==
32 teams will qualify for the tournament through their individual regions offline qualifiers with varying amounts of qualifying spots available.

APAC
Mindfreak
Team Exile5.T1
Integral Nation

Brazil
SSOF Gaming

Europe
Epsilon Esports
TCM-Gaming
Aware Gaming
Team Menace
fabE.DE
Gamers2
HyperGames Team
NxG.Rapid
UX Gaming
fabE.AllStars
Vitality.X
Klar1ty Gaming
Ascentia Gaming
Team Infused

North America
OpTic Gaming
Denial Esports
FaZe Red
OpTic Nation
Team Envy
Revenge
Team Kaliber
FaZe Black
Automatic Reload
Strictly Business
Team Orbit
Prophecy
Below Zero
3sUP

^ Teams are listed by their final positions of their regions qualifiers.

== Groups ==
Group A
Pos	Team	Series		Games		Qualification
1	Optic Gaming	3–0	100%	9–1	90%	Bracket Play
2	Team Orbit	2–1	67%	7-3	70%	Bracket Play
3	NxG.Rapid	1–2	33%	3-6	33%	Eliminated
4	Vitality.X	0–3	0%	0–9	0%	Eliminated

Group B
Pos	Team	Series		Games		Qualification
1	Prophecy	3–0	100%	9–2	82%	Bracket Play
2	Denial Esports	2–1	67%	8-3	73%	Bracket Play
3	HyperGames Team	1–2	33%	3-6	33%	Eliminated
4	Klar1ty Gaming	0–3	0%	0–9	0%	Eliminated

Group C
Pos	Team	Series		Games		Qualification
1	FaZe Red	3–0	100%	9–2	82%	Bracket Play
2	Automatic Reload	2-1	67%	8-4	67%	Bracket Play
3	fabE.DE	1–2	33%	3-8	27%	Eliminated
4	fabE.AllStars	0-3	0%	3-9	25%	Eliminated

Group D
Pos	Team	Series		Games		Qualification
1	OpTic Nation	3–0	100%	9–1	90%	Bracket Play
2	Gamers2	2–1	67%	6–4	60%	Bracket Play
3	Team Exile5.T1	1–2	33%	4-7	36%	Eliminated
4	SSOF Gaming	0–3	0%	2-9	18%	Eliminated

Group E
Pos	Team	Series		Games		Qualification
1	Team Envy	3-0	100%	9-0	100%	Bracket Play
2	Mindfreak	2–1	67%	6–5	55%	Bracket Play
3	Team Menace	1-2	33%	4-6	45%	Eliminated
4	UX Gaming	0–3	0%	1–9	10%	Eliminated

Group F
Pos	Team	Series		Games		Qualification
1	Revenge	3–0	100%	9–2	82%	Bracket Play
2	Aware Gaming	2–1	67%	7–4	64%	Bracket Play
3	3sUP	1–2	33%	4-6	45%	Eliminated
4	Team Infused	0–3	0%	1–9	10%	Eliminated

Group G
Pos	Team	Series		Games		Qualification
1	FaZe Black	3–0	100%	9–3	75%	Bracket Play
2	Below Zero	2–1	67%	8-4	67%	Bracket Play
3	TCM-Gaming	1–2	33%	4-6	45%	Eliminated
4	Acentia Gaming	0–3	0%	1–9	10%	Eliminated

Group H
Pos	Team	Series		Games		Qualification
1	Team Kaliber	3-0	100%	9-3	75%	Bracket Play
2	Strictly Business	2–1	67%	7–4	64%	Bracket Play
3	Epsilon Esports	1-2	33%	6-8	43%	Eliminated
4	Integral Nation	0–3	0%	2–9	18%	Eliminated

== Final standings ==
Place	Team	Prize money
1st	Denial Esports	$400,000
2nd	Revenge	$200,000
3rd	FaZe Red	$120,000
4th	Prophecy	$100,000
5th	Automatic Reload	$70,000
6th	Mindfreak	$50,000
7th	Optic Gaming	$35,000
8th	Team Kaliber	$25,000
9th-12th	Team Envy	
9th-12th	Strictly Business	
9th-12th	Aware Gaming	
9th-12th	Team Orbit	
13th-16th	FaZe Black	
13th-16th	Optic Nation	
13th-16th	Below Zero	
13th-16th	Gamers2	
17th-24th	NxG.Rapid	
17th-24th	HyperGames Team	
17th-24th	fabE.DE	
17th-24th	Team Exile5.T1	
17th-24th	Team Menace	
17th-24th	3sUP	
17th-24th	TCM-Gaming	
17th-24th	Epsilon Esports	
25th-32nd	Vitality.X	
25th-32nd	Klar1ty Gaming	
25th-32nd	fabE.Allstars	
25th-32nd	SSOF Gaming	
25th-32nd	UX Gaming	
25th-32nd	Team Infused	
25th-32nd	Ascentia Gaming	
25th-32nd	Integral Nation	

Preceded by Call of Duty Championship 2014	Call of Duty Championship	Succeeded by Call of Duty Championship 2016
