= Envy (esports) =

American esports franchise

ENVY
- Nickname: The Boys in Blue
- Short name: NV
- Founded: November 19, 2007 (original version); January 17, 2025 (current version)
- Folded: June 27, 2022 (original version)
- Team history: Team EnVyUs (2007–2017); Team Envy (2017–2022); ENVY (2025–present)
- Based in: Dallas, Texas, U.S.
- Colors: Dark blue, blue, black, white
- CEO: Mike "Hastr0" Rufail
- Divisions: Marvel Rivals; Super Smash Bros. Melee; Tom Clancy's Rainbow Six Siege X The Finals; Valorant
- Affiliation: Dallas Fuel
- Main sponsor: Jack in the Box
- Parent group: Envy Gaming
- Website: envy.gg

Envy (stylized in all caps as ENVY), formerly Team Envy, is an American esports franchise based in Dallas, Texas. Founded in 2007 as a professional Call of Duty team under the moniker Team EnVyUs, they fielded rosters in Counter-Strike, FIFA, Fortnite, Gears of War, Halo, League of Legends, Chess, Magic: the Gathering, Overwatch, Paladins, PUBG, Rocket League, SMITE, StarCraft, Super Smash Bros., Street Fighter and Valorant in their original form. Following the merger between Envy Gaming and OpTic Gaming, Envy Gaming retired the Team Envy brand in June 2022, shifting all of them to the OpTic Gaming moniker.

On January 17, 2025, Mike "Hastr0" Rufail announced that he had re-acquired the Team Envy name, as well as associated trademarks, from OpTic, reviving the franchise as ENVY. Envy has since entered Apex Legends, Marvel Rivals, The Finals and Rainbow Six Siege X, as well as re-entering Counter-Strike, Halo, Super Smash Bros. and Valorant (currently as members of the Valorant Champions Tour (VCT) Americas).

== History ==
=== Call of Duty ===
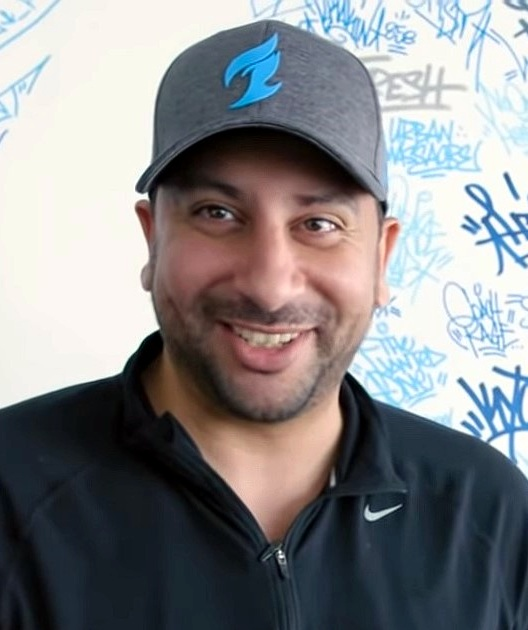
Owner and CEO Mike "Hastr0" Rufail played for the team's Call of Duty team.

Team EnVyUs was founded on November 19, 2007, as a Call of Duty 4 esports team by Skyler "FoRePlayy" Johnson and Tosh "Stainville" McGruder. The team finished runners-up in both the 2008 and 2009 MLG National Championships, with the 2009 roster fielding future owner Mike "Hastr0" Rufail.

At the 2011 National Championship, the final event of the Call of Duty: Black Ops season, Envy once again finished runners-up following a 5-match loser's bracket run; the event also marked the beginning of the classic rivalry with OpTic Gaming, dubbed the eClasico, after defeating them in the loser's bracket final.

In April 2013, as part of the Call of Duty: Black Ops II season, Envy competed in the inaugural US$1 million Call of Duty Championship; their roster for the tournament notably included Stainville, Raymond "Rambo" Lussier and Jordan "JKap" Kaplan. Non-favorites entering the event, the team showed they belonged after beating the undefeated Fariko Impact 3–2 in the winner's bracket finals to book a place in the grand finals. The grand finals consisted of a best-of-11 continuation series re-match with Fariko, where Envy would fall just short after losing 5–6 following a game 11 Search and Destroy, winner-takes-all, showdown. The final round earned the title of "the most famous round of Search and Destroy in Call of Duty history", as well as the match being widely considered one of the "greatest series ever played" in Call of Duty history. The following month, on May 5, Team Envy won their first ever prized LAN championship and only Black Ops II title at UGC Niagara.

In March 2014, as part of the Call of Duty: Ghosts season, Envy competed in the 2014 Call of Duty Championship. The team would once again finish 2nd after producing a miracle run starting from round 1 of the loser's bracket, including a 3–1 victory over OpTic in the loser's bracket final. On June 25, 2014, they announced the return of JKap and the acquisition of Matthew "Formal" Piper. The new roster won Gfinity 3, Envy's first major LAN championship, and Season 3 of MLG's Ghosts Pro League. However, the roster was short-lived as after ESWC 2014, the last event of Ghosts, star AR player Formal and Envy mutually agreed to part ways.

Moving into Call of Duty: Advanced Warfare, Envy made multiple roster changes throughout a disappointing season. The team managed a top-12 finish at the 2015 Call of Duty Championship, before reaching their only final at UGC Niagara 2015. They ended the season with a 4th-place finish at the 2015 MLG World Finals.

In April 2016, Envy acquired Bryan "Apathy" Zhelyazkov and Johnathon "John" Perez to join JKap and Austin "SlasheR" Liddicoat for the latter half of the Call of Duty: Black Ops III season. Together they won Stage 2 of the NA Call of Duty World League, Envy's first major championship since Ghosts. The team then participated at the 2016 MLG Orlando Open, where following a loser's bracket run they met OpTic in the grand finals. In the finals they took the first best-of-5 series 3–2, before being swept in the deciding series. In the last event of the season, in September 2016, Envy competed in the 2016 Call of Duty World League Championship. The team went undefeated in the group stages and drew a winner's bracket round 1 match-up with heavy favorites OpTic, who they had not defeated on LAN in over two years. A 3–1 victory over OpTic, followed by a 3–0 over FaZe Clan opened the path to the grand finals where they met Splyce in the first ever North American vs. European final. Team Envy took down Splyce 3–1 to finally break their 2nd place curse and win the Call of Duty Championship; securing $800,000 as part of the largest Call of Duty prize pool.

Maintaining their championship winning roster, they headed into the Call of Duty: Infinite Warfare season. The first three-quarters of the season proved disappointing as the team failed to live up to their Black Ops III success, with their only notable result being a 3rd-place finish at the 2017 MLG Atlanta Open in February 2017. It was not until the last two events that Envy bounced back. In July 2017, the team finished runners-up at Stage 2 of the 2017 CWL Global Pro League. In August 2017, they competed in the 2017 Call of Duty World League Championship where they attempted to become the first back-to-back champions. In the winner's bracket semi-finals they defeated eUnited 3–1, which included their famous second half 0–10 to 12–10 Uplink comeback. In the winner's bracket final they defeated OpTic to book their place in a record 4th Call of Duty Championship grand finals, however this time around the roster would be heartbroken as they lost both best-of-5 series to OpTic in a rematch to finish in 2nd place.

Heading into Call of Duty: WWII, Envy released JKap, Apathy, and John. In November 2017, they revealed their new roster which included Cuyler "Huke" Garland who had been competing in Team Envy's Halo division as he was too young (under the age of 18) to compete in the Call of Duty World League.

On September 22, 2018, Envy acquired the roster of Evil Geniuses consisting of ACHES, Apathy, Assault and SiLLy. They will join the organization and pair with Huke to complete the roster.

Team Envy's parent company Envy Gaming purchased a Call of Duty League slot in late 2019, ending Team Envy's Call of Duty division. The team, Dallas Empire, competes in the league in the 2020 season.

=== Counter-Strike ===
Team Envy officially entered the Counter-Strike scene, their first venture into PC Esports, on February 2, 2015, after acquiring the French Counter-Strike: Global Offensive (CS:GO) squad of Team LDLC led by captain Vincent "Happy" Schopenhauer.

In March 2015, Envy finished 3rd–4th in their first major appearance, ESL One Katowice 2015, after losing to Ninjas in Pyjamas 0–2 in the semi-finals. Shortly afterwards, in March, the team won their first ever championship at the Gfinity Spring Masters. On June 21, 2015, they traded Richard "shox" Papillon and Edouard "SmithZz" Dubourdeaux to Titan in exchange for Kenny "kennyS" Schrub and Dan "apEX" Madesclaire. With the new roster they finished runners-up at the ESL One Cologne 2015 major, before finally winning their first major championship at DreamHack Open Cluj-Napoca 2015 after defeating Natus Vincere 2–0 in the grand finals. Following the November 2015 Paris terrorist attacks, Envy withdrew from IEM San Jose due to travel safety concerns. The team ended the 2015 season securing 7 championships and 11 grand final appearances.

In March 2016, following an 11–12th-place finish at IEM Katowice 2016, Envy benched Fabien "kioShiMa" Fiey due to communication problems and LDLC White's Timothée "DEVIL" Démolon replaced him in the starting line-up. However, the change would prove unsuccessful and in October 2016, DEVIL was released with Christophe "SIXER" Xia replacing him. On January 15, 2017, the team won WESG 2016, securing US$800,000 as part of the largest CS:GO prize pool.

In February 2017, kennyS, apEX, and Nathan "NBK" Schmitt departed to G2 Esports, with Adil "ScreaM" Benrlitom, Cédric "RpK" Guipouy, and Alexandre "xms" Forté joining in their stead. In late April, Envy officially revealed their academy project.

On June 20, 2018, Team Envy announced they had departed from the Counter-Strike esports scene following the release of their entire CS:GO roster. On September 27, 2018, they announced a new North American team, signing the core of ex-Splyce. Team Envy disbanded their CS:GO division on January 11, 2021.

On September 29, 2026, Envy would return to Counter-Strike for their first Counter-Strike 2 roster, signing the 3DMAX roster following the French organization's financial troubles.

==== Current roster ====
ENVY Counter-Strike 2 roster
Players
Coaches

Handle	Name	Nationality
Lucky	Chastang, Lucas	France
Maka (C)	Canda, Bryan	France
misutaaa	Rabier, Kévin	France
Kursy	Gast, Jeremy	France
Graviti	Brankovic, Filip	France

Head coach

Damien "wasiNk" Dufour

Assistant coach(es)

N/A

Legend:
- (I) Inactive
- (S) Suspended
- (C) In-game leader
- Substitute
- (injured) Injury / Illness

Latest roster transaction: September 29, 2026.

=== Gears of War ===
The Team Envy Gears of War (GoW) division was founded on January 4, 2012, when the organization formed the professional GoW team "EnVyUs MbN". The team competed in Gears of War 3, where they placed 4th in the LAN tournament Hypefestation 2.

In October 2015, Envy announced they were re-entering the GoW competitive scene for Gears of War: Ultimate Edition and were revealed as one of eight teams in ESL's GoW Pro League. In Season 1 of the league, Envy finished runners-up to Denial Esports. In Season 2, they became champions after defeating Denial in a rematch of the finals following a 12–2 regular season record; the tournament win marked their first ever Gears of War title. In July 2016, without dropping a single map, Envy won their second title at the Gears eSports European Open in London.

Heading into Gears of War 4, Envy competed in the Coalition's $1 million Gears Pro Circuit. Their campaign included multiple second-place finishes, as well as the team's third championship in January 2017, when the team dethroned OpTic Gaming at the Mexico City Open, the first ever GoW event in Latin America.

On June 13, 2017, shortly after the end of the Gears Pro Circuit, Team Envy announced they had departed from the Gears of War esports scene following the transfer of their roster to Echo Fox.

=== Halo ===
The Team Envy Halo division was founded on November 10, 2015, when the organization signed a professional esports team for Halo 5: Guardians; the roster included Justin "Pistola" Deese and Austin "Mickwen" McCleary. The team failed to qualify for the 2016 Halo World Championship after being knocked out of the group stages at the NA Regional Finals.

Their first major breakthrough came in July 2016, when the team finished 3rd place at the NA HCS Pro League - 2016 Summer Finals. In the offseason to follow, Envy acquired rookie Cuyler "Huke" Garland and veteran Eric "Snip3down" Wrona. In November, they obtained their first Halo championship after winning HCS Las Vegas 2016. Shortly afterwards, in December, the team dethroned OpTic Gaming and won their second championship at the NA HCS Pro League - 2016 Fall Finals. Their 2016–17 season campaign ended with a runners-up finish at the 2017 Halo World Championship, where the team produced a 5–0 loser's bracket run before losing to OpTic Gaming in the grand finals.

In May 2017, Envy won their third Halo championship at HCS Daytona 2017. Their 2017–18 season campaign ended in April 2018, following a 3rd-place finish at the 2018 Halo World Championship. On May 24, 2018, Team Envy announced they had departed from the Halo esports scene following the release of their roster.

Team Envy announced their return to the Halo esports scene on October 12, 2020, announcing four new players to compete under head coach Alex "Swift Kill" Ramirez for the upcoming Halo franchise game Halo Infinite. After the merger of Envy Gaming and OpTic Gaming in 2021, OpTic took over Team Envy's Halo division.

=== League of Legends ===
On May 18, 2016, after passing Riot's vetting process, Team Envy officially purchased Renegades’ NA LCS spot in a deal reportedly valued in excess of $1 million.

In their inaugural split, following a perfect 4–0 start, Envy finished in 6th place achieving a playoffs berth, where they were eliminated in the first round. In the last chance Regional Qualifier for the 2016 League of Legends World Championship, the team once again fell short after losing in the second round to eventual winners Cloud9.

Following the 2017 Spring Split, Envy faced relegation and had to compete in the Summer Promotion Tournament. In the Promotion Tournament, they qualified into the 2017 NA LCS Summer Split after defeating Gold Coin United 3–2 in the loser's bracket finals.

On November 20, 2017, Team Envy withdrew from League of Legends after their franchise application for the 2018 NA LCS season was declined.

Overview of Team Envy's splits in the NA LCS
Split	Record (win–loss)		Pos	Playoffs	Regional Qualifier	Promotion	MSI	Rift Rivals	Worlds	Roster						
Split	Matches	Games	Pos	Playoffs	Regional Qualifier	Promotion	MSI	Rift Rivals	Worlds	Top	Jungle	Mid	ADC	Support	Coach	Sub (Note: Substitute players with no appearances during a split are not included.)
Summer 2016	8–10	17–25	6th	5th–6th	3rd	—	n/a	none	—	Seraph	Proxcin	Ninja	LOD	Hakuho	Miracle	none
Spring 2017	3–15	14–31	10th ↓	—	n/a	2nd ↑	—	n/a	n/a	Seraph	LirA ♦	Ninja	Apollo	Hakuho	Dylan Falco	Alex Ich
Summer 2017	8–10	21–26	6th	5th–6th	—	—	n/a	—	—	Seraph	LirA ♦	Nisqy	Apollo	Hakuho	viOLet	Pirean

Promoted ↑	Relegated ↓	1st All-Pro Team ♦	2nd All-Pro Team ♦	3rd All-Pro Team ♦

=== Overwatch ===
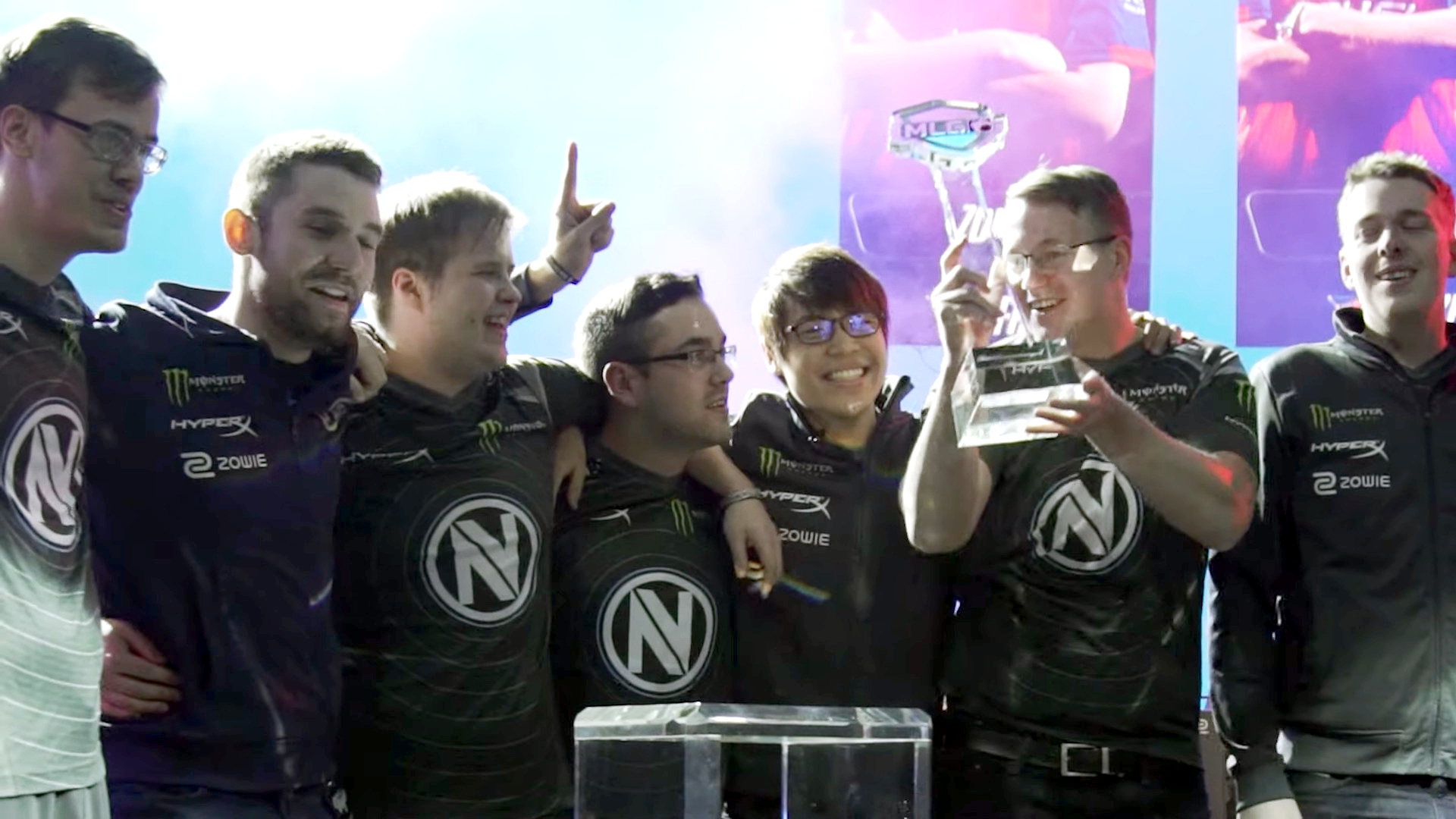
Team EnVyUs after winning MLG Vegas 2016. From left to right: chipshajen, TazMo, Taimou, HarryHook, Mickie, INTERNETHULK, cocco.

Formed during the Overwatch closed beta in February 2016, Team EnVyUs acquired the players of Team Hubris, a North American squad that finished first in six of the seven tournaments played during the beta, to officially create their Overwatch esports division. The team won Season 1 of OGN's Overwatch APEX in Seoul, Korea, marking the first time that a Western-owned team had taken home an esports title on Korean soil. Returning home from Korea, Team EnVyUs ended their pre-Overwatch League journey on a high, going undefeated and winning Season 1 of North America's Overwatch Contenders. On September 20, 2017, Blizzard officially announced that Envy Gaming had acquired the Dallas-based Overwatch League franchise spot, making them one of twelve teams competing in the inaugural season. The team was branded as the Dallas Fuel, and all of the existing members of Team EnVyUs were transferred to the Fuel roster – ending Team Envy's Overwatch division.

On July 2, 2018, Envy Gaming formally announced Team Envy's return to Overwatch Contenders as an academy team for the Dallas Fuel, as the team acquired EnVision Esports' Contenders slot and roster and signed former Team EnVyUs member Ronnie "Talespin" DuPree. The team defeated ATL Academy in the 2019 Season 1 Finals by a combined map record of 7–1 to claim their second Overwatch Contenders regional title. In 2019 Season 2 of Contenders, Envy defeated New York Excelsior's academy team XL2 Academy in the finals to secure their third Contenders regional title.

On April 27, 2020, Team Envy disbanded their Overwatch Contenders division.

=== Rocket League ===
The Team Envy Rocket League division was founded on June 21, 2017, when the organization acquired Northern Gaming's active roster; the roster included Season 3 Rocket League Championship Series champions Remco "Remkoe" den Boer and David "Deevo" Morrow. The organisation separated with the roster on July 30, 2018.

Team Envy reentered Rocket League on April 25, 2020, picking up the ex-Ghost roster consisting of players Braxton "Allushin" Lagarec, Massimo "Atomic" Franceschi, Nick "mist" Costello, and coach Spencer "furane" Taub. Two months later, on June 25, 2020, four-time World Champion Pierre "Turbopolsa" Silfver was added to the starting roster, moving Allushin to the inactive roster. On August 6, 2020, Allushin was confirmed to have left Envy, having joined The Peeps ahead of RLCS Season X. Envy would qualify for the 2021 fall major finishing 12th-14th. On June 27, 2022, the roster would move to Optic Gaming after the two organizations merged.

=== SMITE ===
The Team Envy SMITE division was founded on October 5, 2015, when the organization acquired the North American team AFK Gaming. The team's only championship came in January 2016, when they won the 2016 SMITE World Championship - Xbox One Invitational. In May 2016, during a match against SoaR, Envy violated the SMITE Pro League code of conduct after they forfeited their second game less than two minutes in; the pro-level rage-quit is branded "the worst match in SPL history" and resulted in Hi-Rez sanctioning each participating Envy player with a $500 fine.

On November 30, 2016, Team Envy announced they had departed from the SMITE esports scene following the release of their roster.

=== Valorant ===
On July 13, 2020, Team Envy signed as an official organization for Valorant esports. They signed on Adam "aKis" Kisseberth, Abdo "C4Lypso" Agha, Pujan "FNS" Mehta, Anthony "mummAy" DiPaolo, and Jake "kaboose" McDonald as their first 5. After participating in a few events, Team Envy took the next step in building out their Valorant roster. On September 12, they added Victor "Victor" Wong and Austin "Crashies" Roberts and added "aKis" and "C4Lypso" to their reserve team. On June 30, 2021, they loaned Jimmy "Marved" Nguyen from FaZe Clan and moved Jake "kaboose" McDonald to the bench. On August 5, 2021, they acquired Jaccob "yay" Whiteaker from Andbox and moved Anthony "mummAy" DiPaolo to the bench. When asked the difference between Andbox and Team Envy, yay commented that Envy's players were "more instinctual" and that they "understand how to support my playstyle better so that I am best set up for success". On February 10, 2022, the team announced that it would be competing under the OpTic Gaming brand moving forward.

On March 8, 2025, Team Envy rejoined the Valorant competitive scene by signing the "RANKERS" roster. The team is composed of Matteo "P0PPIN" Weber, Ayan "ion2x" Rastogi, "Eggsterr", Hunter "Inspire" Schline, and Alex "canezerra" Banyasz, along with head coach Dakota "Stunner" MacLeod. The team would earn their spot in the Valorant Champions Tour (VCT) Americas for 2026 by winning the VCT Ascension Americas tournament in October 2025, doing so against TSM.

=== Apex Legends ===
On January 17, 2025, to accompany the relaunch of ENVY, the team signed the Apex Legends roster Loan Sharks, consisting of Dropped, Knocked, YanYa and coach raven (who coached TSM to the Year 3 Championship). The team competed at the Apex Legends Global Series (ALGS) Year 4 Championship in Sapporo, Japan, finishing in 14th place. For the ALGS Open, the team would release Knoqd, YanYa and raven, replacing them with zap, Sikezz and Talmadge as coach, with ENVY finishing in 8th. On May 28, 2025, ENVY would let go of their roster, with their core picked up by Chinese organization All Gamers.

== Ownership and finances ==
In March 2017, it was revealed that prior to becoming chief business officer of Team Envy, John Brock had invested a seven-figure sum into the team. In August 2017, John Brock confirmed that the reported multimillion-dollar investment from venture capital firm SierraMaya360, in late 2016, never materialized.

On September 18, 2017, Team Envy owner Mike "Hastr0" Rufail confirmed that the organization had secured a multimillion-dollar investment from Hersh Interactive Group. The deal entailed Hersh serving as strategic partners to the organization, whilst Hastr0 would remain as the principal owner and operator of the team.

In November 2017, Team Envy signed a multimillion-dollar, multiyear deal with the restaurant chain Jack in the Box.

In August 2020, Post Malone acquired a majority stake, joining as a co-owner.

== Notable alumni ==
Handle	Name	Main Achievement
Call of Duty
FoRePlayy	Skyler Johnson	Co-founder of Team EnVyUs alongside Stainville; 2nd at the 2008 MLG National Championship
Stainville	Tosh McGruder	Co-founder of Team EnVyUs alongside FoRePlayy; 2nd at the 2008, 2009, and 2011 MLG National Championships; 2nd at the 2013 Call of Duty Championship
Hastr0	Mike Rufail	Owner and CEO of Team EnVyUs; 2nd at the 2009 MLG National Championship
Rambo	Raymond Lussier	2nd at the 2013 and 2014 Call of Duty Championship; Call of Duty Grandmaster of KiLLa, MerK, JKap, Scump, Karma, and BigTymeR
JKap	Jordan Kaplan	1st at the 2016 Call of Duty World League Championship and Gfinity 3 (Envy's first major LAN championship); 2nd at the 2013 and 2017 Call of Duty Championship
Apathy	Bryan Zhelyazkov	1st at the 2016 Call of Duty World League Championship; 2nd at the 2017 Call of Duty World League Championship
John	Johnathon Perez	1st and MVP at the 2016 Call of Duty World League Championship; 2nd at the 2017 Call of Duty World League Championship
Counter-Strike: Global Offensive
Happy	Vincent Schopenhauer	1st at DreamHack Open Cluj-Napoca 2015 and WESG 2016; 2nd at ESL One Cologne 2015; Won a team-high 11 tournaments during his tenure
KennyS	Kenny Schrub	1st at DreamHack Open Cluj-Napoca 2015 and WESG 2016; 2nd at ESL One Cologne 2015; Widely recognized as the best AWPer in France, one of the best in the world
Halo
Pistola	Justin Deese	1st at HCS Las Vegas 2016 (Envy's first Halo LAN championship); 2nd at the 2017 Halo World Championship; 3rd at the 2018 Halo World Championship
Mikwen	Austin McCleary	1st at HCS Las Vegas 2016 (Envy's first Halo LAN championship); 2nd at the 2017 Halo World Championship
Snip3down	Eric Wrona	1st at HCS Las Vegas 2016 (Envy's first Halo LAN championship); 2nd at the 2017 Halo World Championship
Huke	Cuyler Garland	1st at HCS Las Vegas 2016 (Envy's first Halo LAN championship); 2nd at the 2017 Halo World Championship; Player for the Dallas Empire (Envy Gaming's Call of Duty League team)
Overwatch
INTERNETHULK	Dennis Hawelka	Captain of the roster which achieved a record 57-game winning streak from June 2016 to August 2016; Recruited Pongphop "Mickie" Rattanasangchod; 1st and Captain at: OGN Overwatch APEX - Season 1; MLG Vegas 2016 - Overwatch NA Invitational; Hawelka died on November 8, 2017, at the age of 30. The yearly Overwatch League Dennis Hawelka Award was created in his honor.
SMITE
Allied	David Hance	1st at the 2016 SMITE World Championship - Xbox One Invitational; Hance died on May 3, 2017, at the age of 25 after a year-long battle with cancer.
StarCraft
viOLet	Kim Dong-Hwan (김동환)	Playing as a Zerg in LotV, finished top 4 at: Red Bull Battle Grounds 2015 - Grand Finals (Archon Mode); DreamHack Open 2016 - Leipzig; IEM Season 11 - Shanghai; Kings of the North - Season 3; Former head coach of Envy's League of Legends team; Former assistant coach for the Dallas Fuel (Envy Gaming's Overwatch League team)

== Awards and nominations ==
Date	Award	Category	Nominated work	Result	Ref.
December 3, 2015	The Game Awards 2015	eSports Player of the Year	Kenny "KennyS" Schrub	Won	
March 19, 2016	SXSW Gaming Awards 2016	Most Valuable Esports Team	not specified	Nominated	
November 21, 2016	The eSports Industry Awards 2016	eSports Team of the Year	All Games	Won	
