= Complexity Gaming =

American professional electronic sports organization

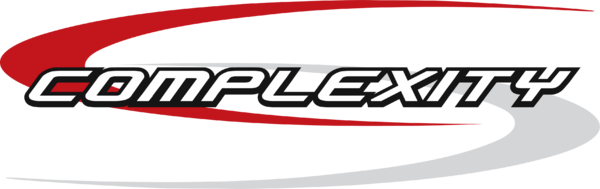
- Short name: COL
- Divisions: Apex Legends; Clash Royale; Counter-Strike 2 Dota 2 Dota Artifact; Fortnite Battle Royale; Halo Infinite; Hearthstone; Madden NFL; Magic: The Gathering Arena; Rocket League; Valorant
- Founded: 2003; 23 years ago
- Folded: 2026; 0 years ago
- Based in: Frisco, Texas
- Location: United States
- Owner: Jason Lake; (2003–17); John Goff; (2017-24); Jerry Jones; (2017-24); Global Esports Properties; (2024–2026)
- CEO: Jason Lake
- Partners: HyperX; Panini America; Twitch; WinStar World Casino; H4X; MSI; Extra Life; Miller Lite; GameStop; H-E-B; Lenovo; United States Army
- Website: complexity.gg

Complexity Gaming, formerly stylized as compLexity, was an American esports franchise headquartered in Frisco, Texas. The franchise was founded in 2003 by Jason Lake and was later co-owned by real estate investor John Goff, and Dallas Cowboys owner Jerry Jones.

It operated out of the Legion by Lenovo Esports Center, an esports training facility in The Star, during Jones' co-ownership. The franchise competed in Apex Legends, Call of Duty, Counter-Strike 2, Dota 2, FIFA, Fortnite, Halo Infinite, Hearthstone, Heroes of the Storm, League of Legends, Madden, Magic: The Gathering Arena, Rocket League and Valorant.

In addition to competitive teams, the franchise also streamed gaming sessions over Twitch. It formerly maintained Limit (stylized as Complexity Limit), a World of Warcraft guild, until the end of their sponsorship deal with the guild in early 2022.

After Goff and Jones purchased the franchise in 2017, Complexity Gaming was acquired by investor group Global Esports Properties, LLC in March 2024. On September 23, 2026, Complexity was shut down, with the decision made in late 2025.

== History ==
=== Founding and early years (2003–2007) ===
Complexity was started by Jason Lake in 2003 after Lake paid two gamers from his own pocket to form a team. Lake voluntarily removed himself from the roster in 2004 and shifted into an administrative and coaching role. The team was formed during the early days of esports in North America and Lake, then a real estate lawyer based in the Atlanta, Georgia, area, paid his players' salaries and travel expenses out of his own pocket, totaling more than $400,000 by 2007. Following wins at the 2006 Intel Summer Championships and the DirecTV Championship Gaming Invitational, Lake sold the team to DirecTV for $100,000. Complexity was rebranded as Los Angeles Complexity and joined the Championship Gaming Series as part of the deal. Throughout the history of coL, numerous staff members worked to raise the organization above esports standards in the 2000s. Notable members include Kyle "kuniva" Shellhouse (frag movies, content), Jordan "p4t" Taylor(mIRC admin, recruitment), Rick "digx" Martinez(Graphics, Animation), Shane "exica" Bailey(Graphics, Animation)

In 2007, Complexity's CS:Source team was crowned the champion of the CEVO Professional Division Season 4.

Complexity continued to operate after the CGS folded in 2008, fielding teams in CS:GO, Call of Duty: Black Ops II, and Dota 2, among others.

Complexity was a member of the G7 Teams, a group that promoted esports in the late 2000s. They were removed from the group and re-added in 2009. In 2009, Complexity placed 3rd at Dreamhack Winter 2009 and 2nd at the IEM IV American Championship.

They delved back into Quake with Quake Live where they picked up Sander "Vo0" Kaasjager and Brian "dkt" Flanders. They played Madden NFL 2010, Team Fortress 2, Dota 2, and FIFA 10.

On April 11, 2013, Complexity was the winner of the Call of Duty: Black Ops II championship at ESWC 2013.

On April 6, 2014, they sold their Call of Duty team to Evil Geniuses.

On March 22, 2015, Complexity announced that they had acquired the Heroes of the Storm team Barrel Boys, with a roster of Stafford "McIntyre" McIntyre, Alexei "Blinks" Bazhenov, Drew "Trummel" Trummel, Aaron "Erho" Kappes, and Edward "TigerJK" Hong.

Complexity's Dota 2 team was not invited to The International 2015 but qualified in the regional qualifying tournament. Complexity's Dota team is based in a gaming house near Fort Lauderdale, Florida.

=== Sale to Jerry Jones (2017–2024) ===
In 2017, the team was purchased by Dallas Cowboys owner Jerry Jones and real estate investor John Goff and relocated to Frisco, Texas. Lake remained CEO of the team as part of the deal, while fellow cofounder Jason Bass sold his stake in the team. In 2019, GameStop sponsored a new headquarters and training facility in The Star, a complex that also acts as the training center for the Dallas Cowboys NFL team.

On March 1, 2018, Complexity added the Rocket League team of Metsanauris, Mognus, and al0t (formerly members of the esports team Method).

In October 2019, they collaborated with Luke Millanta to create a collection of Complexity-branded Counter-Strike: Global Offensive weapon skins.

=== Reacquisition by Lake and shutdown (2024–2026) ===
On March 1, 2024, GameSquare Holdings announced the sale of Complexity Gaming to Global Esports Properties, an investor group led by Complexity's founder and CEO Jason Lake, for $10.36 million, pending TSXV approval. The sale followed GameSquare's approval of its merger with FaZe Clan just days prior. The deal included an initial payment of $75,000 and a seller-financed note of approximately $9.61 million, with GameSquare entitled to 50% of proceeds from any equity raised by Global Esports in excess of $500,000.

Complexity would leave Counter-Strike on August 19, 2025, due to financial issues. Four of their five players moved to Passion UA, an organization owned by Ukrainian soccer player Oleksandr Zinchenko.

In a September 23, 2026 video on X (formerly Twitter), Lake announced that Complexity had shut down. The process to wind down the organization's operations began sometime in late 2025 following the exit of the Counter-Strike team. The Complexity intellectual property was transferred back to GameSquare Holdings as a result.

== Former divisions ==
=== League of Legends ===
==== 2011 ====
On April 29, 2011, Complexity acquired Epic Charmanders, with a roster consisting of Atlanta, FitterHappier, Gynsingg, Nubbypoohbear, RicePanda, and Shales. The team qualified for the League of Legends Championship Series in its inaugural Spring 2013 split, which began in April. During the regular season, it finished in last place with a 9–19 record, eliminating it from the Spring Playoffs. Complexity's last-place finish relegated it to the Challenger League instead of playing the LCS Summer Split. Complexity finished season one of the Challenger League with a 19–7 record in the Ancient Golem Conference, earning a bye to the playoff semifinals. In the playoffs, it defeated Team Curse but then lost to Team Coast to finish second in the CS. In August, Yuhn, IWillDominate, and Hao joined the team. Atlanta and FitterHappier left. On November 29, Patoy and DontMashMe joined. Yuhn, Shales, and Gynsingg left.

==== 2012 ====
On January 1, IWillDominate transferred to Team Dignitas. On January 12, RicePanda, Nubbypoohbear, Hao, DontMashMe, and Patoy left the team. Although Complexity spent the rest of 2012 without a primary League of Legends roster, they were able to expand their trainee roster by adding six players to their compLexity Academy League of Legends (CA.LoL) program.

==== 2013 ====
On February 2, Complexity acquired the roster of The Brunch Club, Nickwu, Lautemortis, Chuuper, MeyeA, Brunch Ü, and Bischu. February, Meteos joins. On March 14, the team received a sponsorship from Newegg. April 2, PR0LLY joins. Chuuper moves to sub. April 20, Brunch U retires, Chuuper moves to AD. On June 17 Nickwu left. On June 18 MegaZero joined. In September, Aniratak joined. On October 3, Lautemortis stepped down from the starter and captain position. On November 23, PR0LLY left the team.

==== 2014 ====
On January 9, Complexity released the year's roster. MegaZero, Chuuper, and MeyeA left the team. On April 29, compLexity.Black became Complexity Gaming. On June 5, Brokenshard replaced by Kez as starting jungler due to visa complications. On October 4, goldenglue joined the team as starter while ROBERTxLEE and Pr0lly moved to the sub position. On November 23, Kubz left the team. On December 23, Westrice left and later joined Cloud9.

=== Dota 2 ===
On February 17, 2012, Complexity signed the North American squad Team Fire. Under the COL banner, the team earned an invite to Valve's second iteration of The International. The team finished in 9th-12th-place. Jio "Jeyo" Madayag left the team to join Evil Geniuses in October 2012. Complexity then sold their squad to Team Liquid in December.

On August 27, 2014, COL returned to the Dota 2 scene with the former Heroes of Newerth roster stayGreen. Led by Kyle "swindlemelonzz" Freedman, the squad went through multiple roster changes in the first few months. The team added Tal "Fly" Aizik and qualified for The International 2015, placing third in its group. In the playoffs, Complexity lost to both Evil Geniuses and Virtus.pro, ending the team's run at the event. Following the tournament's conclusion, Complexity had to rebuild their roster as both MoonMeander and Fly left to build Monkey Business, which would later become OG. The two were replaced by Peter "wayto" Nguyen and Michael "mjw" Nguyen in September 2015. Both players left the team a month later.

In November 2015, Complexity picked up the Swedish trio of Linus "Limmp" Blomdin, Rasmus "Chessie" Blomdin and Simon "Handsken" Haag. Together with swindlemelonzz and his brother, Zakari "Zfreek" Freedman, Complexity qualified for several events in early 2016, including the Shanghai Major 2016. COL placed last in their group but earned a direct invite to the Manila Major. Following the Shanghai Major, the team beat North American rivals Evil Geniuses at Epicenter 2016 to earn a top-4 finish. Their performance declined after that and the team lost multiple qualifiers and placed 9th-12th at the Manila Major. Their season ended after losing in qualifiers for The International 2016.

The 2016–2017 season began with another roster change. Limmp, Chessie and Handsken parted ways with the team to return to Sweden. On September 15, 2016, COL added Mihai "canceL^^" Antonio, David "Moo" Hull and Justin "jk" Rosselle. Before the team attended their first LAN event however, jk left COL. Former Team Archon player and Moo teammate Jaron "monkeys-forever" Clinton was added and played with the team at the Northern Arena BEAT Invitational and the Boston Major. The team finished last at both events.

Complexity and cancel^^ parted ways in February 2017. COL added Eric "747" Dong to replace cancel^^, another former Team Archon player. The team did not perform well and made a final roster change going into the last portion of the season. On May 23, 2017, COL added European pubstar Feras "Feero" Hroob and North American veteran Jimmy "Demon" Ho to its roster. The team continued to struggle and failed to qualify for The International 2017, ending its season.

On September 6, 2017, Swedish brothers Limmp and Chessie returned to Complexity to replace Feero and Demon. The new roster qualified for several Dota Professional Circuit events and finished fifth at the StarLadder i-League Invitational 4, its best placing of the season . On March 16, 2018, internal conflicts within the team led to the removal of captain Kyle, aka swindlemelonzz. Complexity also removed Chessie and added former COL player MoonMeander, as well as Southeast Asia veteran Adam "343" Shah. The team failed to qualify for The International 2018, leading to another roster change.

=== Call of Duty ===
On April 11, 2013, Complexity was the winner of Call of Duty: Black Ops II at ESWC 2013.

On April 6, 2014, COL sold their Call of Duty team to Evil Geniuses.

On January 12, 2018, Complexity returned to competitive Call of Duty after acquiring Christopher "Parasite" Duarte, Tyler "FeLo" Johnson, Jared "Nagafen" Harrell, and Jeremy "StuDyy" Astacio. Nagafen on was replaced eight days later on January 20 with former Enigma6 player Brandon "Dashy" Otell. The team performed poorly and Parasite, FeLo, and Nagefen were replaced with Doug "Censor" Martin, Rasim "Blazt" Ogresevic and former COL player Ricky "Ricky" Stacy. The new group secured a spot at the 2018 CWL Pro League.

=== Counter Strike 2 ===
Complexity left the CS2 discipline in August 2025 due to financial issues.

=== Valorant ===
After failing to be selected for the new partnership leagues by Riot Games for the 2023 Valorant Champions Tour, Complexity announced they would be parting ways with their male roster.

== Partnerships ==
On June 15, 2018, Complexity announced a new partnership with apparel brand H4X.

On November 13, 2018, WinStar World Casino was announced as Complexity's third partner.

On January 14, 2019, Complexity partnered with Panini America to produce original content, on-site activations, and trading cards.

On January 16, 2019, Complexity partnered with HyperX on peripherals.

On April 29, 2019, COL partnered with MSI on hardware.

GameStop announced its the sponsorship of COL's headquarters, the GameStop Performance Center, on March 27, 2019.

Miller Lite started sponsoring Complexity Gaming on May 15, 2019. Part of the sponsorship includes the naming rights to the Miller Lite Player Lounge inside the GameStop Performance Center.

On October 7, 2019, Complexity partnered with Extra Life to support Children's Miracle Network Hospitals.

On March 2, 2021, Complexity partnered with Dairy Max to create an educational cooking series.
