= FaZe Clan =

Professional esports and former entertainment organization

FaZe Holdings Inc.
- Trade name: FaZe Esports; FaZe Clan
- Type: Private
- Traded as: Nasdaq: FAZE
- Industry: Esports; Content creation; Merchandising
- Predecessor: FaZe Sniping (2010–2011)
- Founded: May 30, 2010; 16 years ago
- Founder: Eric "ClipZ" Rivera; Jeff "House Cat" Emann; Ben "Resistance" Christensen
- Headquarters: Frisco, Texas, United States
- Key people: Justin Kenna (President); Kaysan Ghasseminejad (Advisor)
- Owner: GameSquare
- Divisions: FaZe Vegas (50%)
- Subsidiaries: FaZe Clan Inc.; CTRL Holdings (minority)
- FaZe Clan
- Games: Call of Duty; Counter-Strike 2; EA Sports FC; Fortnite; PlayerUnknown's Battlegrounds; PUBG Mobile; Rocket League; Tom Clancy's Rainbow Six Siege; Valorant; Halo Infinite; Super Smash Bros. Ultimate
- Colors
- Website: fazeclan.com

FaZe Media, Inc.
- Trade name: FaZe Clan
- Type: Private
- Industry: Content creation; Intellectual property; Licensing
- Founded: May 14, 2024; 2 years ago
- Founder: Richard "Banks" Bengtson; Justin Kenna
- Defunct: December 27, 2025; 10 months ago
- Headquarters: Culver City, California, United States
- Key people: Matt Kalish (Board member)
- Owner: Gigamoon Media (74.5%)

YouTube information
- Channels: FaZe Clan; FaZe
- Genres: Gaming; entertainment
- Subscribers: 9.1 million (combined)
- Views: 1.1 billion (FaZe Clan)
- Last updated: December 29, 2025
- Website: fazeclan.com

FaZe Clan, or simply FaZe, is a professional esports and former entertainment brand. Founded on May 30, 2010, as FaZe Sniping, the organization has professional players and content creators from around the world, across multiple games.

In October 2023, an agreement was announced for FaZe Clan's parent company FaZe Holdings to be acquired by GameSquare in an all stock deal. In May 2024, GameSquare announced the formation of a new company, FaZe Media. This formation spins off FaZe Holdings into an esports company (FaZe Esports) and an internet media company (FaZe Media).

In December 2025, an exodus of members caused the entertainment division of FaZe (FaZe Media) to shut down.

== History ==
=== 2010–2019: Formation and early growth ===
FaZe Sniping made their debut on YouTube on May 30, 2010. Originally, the group was a Call of Duty clan founded by three players, Eric "CLipZ" Rivera, Jeff "House Cat" Emann (now known as "Timid") and Ben "Resistance" Christensen. The trio garnered a reputation for innovating trickshotting in the game Call of Duty: Modern Warfare 2. Their YouTube content took off when Ted "Fakie" joined the clan. It was then that FaZe unveiled the most popular series on their channel, ILLCAMS. FaZe Clan's focus on trickshotting and a personality-driven approach to social media led to it becoming one of the first popular YouTube video game channels, compared to other Call of Duty channels that often focused on winning tournaments. In 2012, the channel had one million subscribers, and the clan began to branch out into esports competitions. Separate from the clan's YouTube content creators, teams under the FaZe name began competing in competitions such as the Call of Duty Championship and Counter-Strike: Global Offensive Major Championships. The original CEO, Thomas "Temperrr" Oliveira, had been a member of FaZe since he was 16 years old. Oliveira and COO Richard “Banks” Bengtson created the first FaZe shared home in 2014 in Plainview, New York, intended to facilitate lifestyle content alongside their gaming content.

In 2015, former social media platform Hubrick, run by Norwegian entrepreneur Sebastian Geurts, invested in FaZe Clan. Hubrick recruited former record executive Lee Trink as an advisor. In January 2016, FaZe Clan acquired G2 Esports's Counter-Strike: Global Offensive international lineup, who competed as FaZe Clan in the 2016 MLG Major Championship: Columbus. The team won second place in ELEAGUE Major: Boston 2018, losing to US-based Cloud9. In 2017, Bengtson moved to Los Angeles, starting a new shared home with YouTubers called the Clout House. FaZe Clan were the runner ups in ESL Pro League Season 6, second runner ups in ESL Pro League Season 7 and ESL One Cologne 2018, and were the champions of ELeague CS:GO Premier that same year, winning $500,000 of prize money. In 2018, Greg Selkoe, founder of streetwear web retailer Karmaloop, became the president of FaZe Clan, with Trink becoming the CEO. Later, FaZe Clan opened their series A funding round. Throughout 2019, musicians Ray J, DJ Paul, Offset, Swae Lee, Yo Gotti, Pitbull, and Disco Fries, basketball players Meyers Leonard, Josh Hart, Ben Simmons, Jamal Murray, footballer Gregory van der Wiel, skateboarder Nyjah Huston, radio host Big Boy, music executives Sylvia Rhone, Troy Carter and Guy Oseary and actor Chris O'Donnell invested in FaZe Clan. In December 2019, FaZe closed their series A led by entrepreneur Jimmy Iovine and mobile e-commerce platform NTWRK.

=== 2020–2024: Public listing and organizational changes ===
In January 2020, FaZe Clan obtained a $22.7 million investment loan from a private lender. FaZe was advised on the transaction by Canaccord Genuity, a Canadian financial company. On June 18, 2020, FaZe Clan announced their co-ownership of CTRL, a food supplement company. In December, FaZe Clan was worth $305 million and their monthly revenue was estimated to be $40 million. In 2020, Faze Studios released the film Crimson, with Brian "Rug" Awadis in a leading role. On June 10, 2021, FaZe Clan became the first esports team to be featured on the cover of Sports Illustrated. The same year, a merger was announced with special purpose acquisition investors B. Riley Principal to become a public company listed on NASDAQ, with an expected initial valuation of around $1 billion. As part of this merge, FaZe would receive $291 million from B. Riley, and would be renamed to Faze Holdings Inc. and refocus themselves as a brand for "the voice of youth culture". The merger was approved by the U.S. Securities and Exchange Commission, and the company went public on July 20, 2022, however with a lower than announced valuation of $725 million. That same year, in 2021, FaZe Clan member Frazier Khattrri (FaZe Kay) became one of the lead promoters of Save the Kids token, a pump and dump cryptocurrency which was additionally promoted by FaZe members Jarvis, Teeqo and Nikan. Upon the token's launch and revelation to the public that it was a pump and dump, FaZe removed Kay and suspended Jarvis, Teeqo, and Nikan for their involvement. Teeqo was later found to be unaware of and uninvolved in the pump and dump, and was reinstated. In July 2022, FaZe Clan became a publicly traded company. The company had only received a portion of the $291 million they were promised by private investors ahead of their merge with B. Riley Principal 150 Merger Group. On January 20, 2023, the price of their stock fell below one dollar for the first time, which put them at risk of being delisted. On February 15, 2023, the stock was at $0.76.

In March 2023, it was reported that the company received a notice of delisting, which gave them 180 days to raise the stock price above one dollar. Trink, the CEO, had expressed concerns and had stated that the company is working towards a solution to their problem. As of September 2022, it was reported that the organization had enough money to last them until November 2023. In February, FaZe Clan laid off 20% of their staff. Trink attributed it to uncertainty in the economy and stated that the company would focus on financial discipline. He reported that the there was a 25% increase in revenue from 2021 to 2022. FaZe Clan reported losses of approximately $14 million in the first two quarters of 2023, with slightly decreased revenues. In April 2023, Snoop Dogg departed from FaZe Clan's board. On September 11, 2023, FaZe Clan announced the immediate termination of Trink from his position as CEO. The company appointed Christoph Pachler, the CEO and CFO of FaZe Clan, as the interim CEO. In October, it was announced that FaZe Clan had been acquired by GameSquare Holdings Inc., and subsequently added to the GameSquare esports portfolio. With this acquisition, Bengtson, Oliveira, and Yousef Abdelfattah (FaZe Apex) were appointed as CEO, president, and COO respectively.

On April 27, 2024, Bengtson kicked out members of FaZe Clan, reducing the content creator roster to fourteen members in an effort to "reboot" the organization. On May 6, the Esports World Cup Foundation, funded by the Saudi Arabia Public Investment Fund and organizers of the Esports World Cup tournament series, announced the 30 organizations (known in the ESWC as Clubs) that would make up the Club Support Program, with FaZe Clan being one of them. This program gives teams a one-time six-figure stipend if an organization is willing to enter new esports as well as additional funding each year if they drive viewership and fan engagement to the Esports World Cup.

=== 2024–2026: Reboot, FaZe Media foundation, and closure ===
On May 14, GameSquare CEO Justin Kenna announced the formation of FaZe Media (FaZe Media, Inc. and FaZe Media Holdings, LLC), led by Richard "FaZe Banks" Bengtson as CEO. This formation spins off FaZe Holdings into an esports company, and an internet media company, named FaZe Media. FaZe Media received $11 million in investment from Matt Kalish, the president and co-founder of DraftKings, resulting in Kalish owning 49% of FaZe Media during their foundation. FaZe Media will focus on developing a creator-led internet media company with GameSquare continuing to own 100% of the esports competition assets under FaZe Esports (incorporated as FaZe Clan, Inc.). On June 19, Richard "FaZe Banks" Bengtson acquired 25.5% in FaZe Media from GameSquare. In December, FaZe was nominated for Best Marathon Stream and won Best Content Organization at The Streamer Awards. At the time, their new streamer roster included JasonTheWeen, Adapt, PlaqueBoyMax, Banks, Silky, Lacy, and Stable Ronaldo.

On March 31, 2025, GameSquare announced the divestiture of their remaining 25.5% stake in FaZe Media. The company retains full ownership of FaZe Esports. On July 28, Bengtson stepped down from his role as CEO following accusations of scamming fans through the meme coin MLG.

On December 25, Adapt, JasonTheWeen, Lacy, Silky, and StableRonaldo announced their departure from FaZe Clan on X, with Apex, Swagg, YourRAGE, Kaysan, and Rug announcing their departures in the following days though Kaysan will continue to be involved with FaZe Esports. Bloomberg reported that Kalish gave FaZe creators an ultimatum to join HardScope, his then-newly launched creator agency, or go independent, believing it was necessary as he believed the FaZe Media business model was "unsustainable". In addition, some reports claimed that HardScope required creators to pay 20% of their overall revenue to it to continue using the FaZe brand. On the same day, FaZe Clan announced the closure of FaZe Media, effectively leaving FaZe Esports as the only operating entity of the FaZe brand.

=== 2026–present: FaZe return speculations, and CORE ===
On April 30, 2026, several content creators formerly in FaZe formed the replacement content group named CORE (an acronym for “Create, Own, Run, Everything”), following their departure from FaZe Clan in late 2025 amid internal disputes regarding contracts and ownership of the organization. The group consisted of Stable Ronaldo, Adapt, Marlon, Lacy, JasonTheWeen, and Silky. The YouTube channel hosting their announcement video was terminated after gaining over 100,000 subscribers in the first several hours of launch, due to "automated security flags" disabling the connected Google account, but it was quickly restored.

Their announcement was concurrent to FaZe Banks' first livestream.

== Divisions ==
FaZe Clan has operated several regional and game-specific divisions throughout their history, often created through partnerships or rebranding to expand the organization's competitive and cultural reach. These divisions have ranged from regionally focused esports lineups (such as FaZe France in Europe) to official franchise teams established within publisher-run leagues, such as Atlanta FaZe in the Call of Duty League.

=== FaZe France (2013–2015) ===
On September 19, 2013, FaZe eSniping, the competitive Call of Duty sniping division, was announced, consisting of Raphael "Zydar" Zydar, Elliot "Hyspe" and Kevin "RanbOw" and led by Anil "WaRTeK" Brancaleoni. On April 3, 2014, FaZe Clan announced the rebranding of FaZe eSniping to FaZe France. RanbOw left the team after one and a half years, with Anthony "Toto" replacing him. On May 26, 2015, the players and staff of FaZe France stated they weren't satisfied with FaZe's plans and left to create their own organization.

=== FaZe Vegas ===
On May 2, 2019, Activision Blizzard announced that Atlanta Esports Ventures had purchased one of the first five franchise slots for the Call of Duty League. According to ESPN, the publisher was looking to sell slots for approximately $25 million per team. "We have the opportunity to—once again—play a pivotal role in Atlanta's diverse esports community by bringing the future of Call of Duty esports to the city," said Hamilton in a release at the time. In October 2019, AEV and FaZe Clan announced a partnership team named the Atlanta FaZe.

Atlanta FaZe was officially renamed and relocated to Las Vegas as FaZe Vegas on September 19, 2025.

==== Current roster ====
FaZe Vegas roster
Players
Coaches

Handle	Name	Nationality
Alluka	Bindal, Mohammed	Germany
HyDra	Paco, Rusiewiez	France
Scrap	Thomas, Ernst	United States
Simp	Lehr, Chris	United States

Head coach

James "Crowder" Crowder

Assistant coach(es)

Richard "RJ" Simoncelli

Legend:
- (I) Inactive
- (S) Suspended
- Substitute
- (injured) Injury / Illness

Roster updated October 19, 2026.

== Rosters ==
=== FaZe Esports roster ===
FaZe Clan rosters

Counter-Strike 2
Handle	Name	Nationality
frozen	Čerňanský, David	Slovakia
jcobbb	Pietruszewski, Jakub	Poland
Twistzz	Van Dulken, Russel	Canada
JBOEN	Nielsen, Jason Boe	Denmark
Neityu	Aubry, Ryan	France
broky (I)	Saukants, Helvijs	Latvia

EA Sports FC
Handle	Name	Nationality
TDKeane	Songsaisakul, Teedech	Thailand
Michael04	Rojjanasinlapin, Sorawit	Thailand
JubJub	Varanan, Phatanasak	Thailand

Fortnite Battle Royale
Handle	Name	Nationality
EpikWhale	Cotton, Shane	United States

Halo
Handle	Name	Nationality
Penguin	Hearon, Zane	United States
Falcated	Garcia, Michael	United States
Suppressed	Lopez, Donnie	United States
Trippy	Taylor, Joey	United States

PUBG: Battlegrounds
Handle	Name	Nationality
Fuzzface	Tillberg-Persson, David	Sweden
Aitzy	Kapustin, Ivan	Russia
ubah	Jahnsen, Ludvik	Norway
Gustav	Blønd, Gustav	Denmark
rawryy	Logue, Rory	United Kingdom

PUBG Mobile
Handle	Name	Nationality
Beerii	Phomrat, Peerapol	Thailand
Lycan	Boonrat, Apiwat	Thailand
BulShark	Maneerat, Ratchapol	Thailand
Vintorez	Pluksang, Tharit	Thailand
MR5	Murasri, Thiraphong	Thailand
TonyK	Muensa, Nattawut	Thailand

Rainbow Six Siege
Handle	Name	Nationality
VITAKING	Augusto dos Santos, Victor	Brazil
Handyy	Ferreira, Thiago	Brazil
KDS	Chiste Fontes Santos, Eduardo	Brazil
Cyber	Ramos, Jaime	Brazil
soulz1	Romero Schinke, Lucas	Brazil

Apex Legends
Handle	Name	Nationality
Sinetic	Himanen, Otso	Finland
Zaine	Kazi, Zaine	United Kingdom
Naghz	Naghawi, Ali	United Kingdom

Super Smash Bros. Ultimate
Handle	Name	Nationality
Sparg0	Valdez, Edgar	Mexico

Legend:
- (I) Inactive
- (S) Suspended
- (L) On loan
- (2W) Two-way player
- Substitute
- (injured) Injury / Illness

=== Content creator roster ===
==== Former members ====
Name	Year joined	Year left
Temperrr	2010	2025
ClipZ	2010 (1) 2019 (2)	2012 (1) 2020 (2)
Timid (formerly House Cat)	2010	2014
Resistance	2010	2012
Apex	2011	2025
Rain	2011	2024
Teeqo	2011	2024
Fakie	2011	2014
Rug	2012	2025
Adapt	2013	2025
Banks	2013	2025
Sensei	2013	2023
Kay	2013	2021
Jev	2014	2025
Blaze	2015	2024
Nikan	2015	2024
Censor	2015	2019
Replays	2016	2025
Karrigan	2016	2019
Boat	2018	2025
Tfue	2018	2019
Nickmercs	2019	2025
Sway	2019	2024
Jarvis	2019	2023
Swagg	2020	2025
Bronny	2020	2024
K1 (Kyler Murray)	2021	2025
Scope	2021	2025
Kaysan	2021	2025
ZooMaa	2021	2025
Stable Ronaldo	2022	2025
Snoop Dogg	2022	2023
YourRAGE	2023	2025
Bluefille	2023	2023
JasonTheWeen	2024	2025
Lacy	2024	2025
PlaqueBoyMax	2024	2025
Silky	2024	2025

== Partnerships and collaborations ==
FaZe Clan has partnered with caffeinated drink mix brand Gamma Labs' G Fuel since 2012 – one of the longest promotional collaborations in esports as of December 2025. As a part of the collaboration, the company released FaZe-themed flavors, such as "FaZe Clan's Battle Juice" in 2019.

On May 2, 2019, Atlanta Esports Ventures announced the purchase of a franchise spot in Call of Duty league in partnership with FaZe Clan. The resulting team, Atlanta FaZe, was announced on October 26, 2019.

On November 22, 2018, FaZe Clan collaborated with sportswear manufacturer Champion to release exclusive clothing. In 2019, Champion released exclusive clothing with FaZe on four occasions. Champion manufactures most of the clothing released by FaZe. On March 14, 2019, FaZe Clan collaborated with clothing brand Siberia Hills for a limited-time hoodie release.

On March 21, 2019, FaZe Clan announced their partnership with automobile manufacturer Nissan. Nissan started producing two original series on FaZe's YouTube channel.

On September 26, 2019, football club Manchester City announced their partnership with FaZe Clan for content creation and clothing.

On July 20, 2019, FaZe Clan opened a booth at ComplexCon 2019, where they sold exclusive clothing in collaboration with Champion, label Lyrical Lemonade and clothing brand 24karats. They collaborated with 24karats again on August 16, 2019, to release clothing accessories, and with Lyrical Lemonade on November 27 of the same year.

On September 17, 2019, FaZe Clan collaborated with headwear company New Era. Through November 3 to 22, 2019, FaZe Clan collaborated with designer Warren Lotas, sportswear brand Kappa and clothing brand CLOT respectively to release exclusive clothing.

In August 2021, FaZe Clan announced a sponsorship with McDonald's. The companies will partner on a series of content and other projects featuring major FaZe Clan stars.

In September 2021, FaZe Clan and DC Comics collaborated on a limited edition comic book, written by Josh Trujillo and illustrated by Scot Eaton, featuring Batman and several members of the FaZe Clan.

In January 2023, FaZe Clan announced a shoe collaboration with Nike in the form of a Nike LeBron Nxxt Gen with the co-branding and colors of FaZe Clan. The shoe was debuted in a game played by Sierra Canyon.

== Philanthropy ==
On March 15, 2020, FaZe Clan unveiled Fight 2 Fund, their four-week charity Call of Duty: Warzone event, in which social media influencers, YouTubers, streamers, celebrities, sportspeople and musicians participate. Viewers could donate money, which was intended for charities supporting people affected by the coronavirus disease 2019. The event raised over $124,000.

== Awards and nominations ==
Year	Ceremony	Category	Work	Result	Ref.
2024	The Streamer Awards	Best Content Organization	Themselves	Won	
2024	The Streamer Awards	Best Marathon Stream	FaZe Subathon	Nominated	
2025	The Streamer Awards	Best Marathon Stream	FaZe Subathon	Nominated	
2025	The Streamer Awards	Best Content Organization	Themselves	Won	

Awards and achievements
Preceded by PGL Major Stockholm 2021; Natus Vincere	PGL Major Antwerp 2022 winner 2022	Succeeded by IEM Rio Major 2022; Outsiders
Preceded by w7m esports	Six Invitational winner 2025	Succeeded by FaZe Clan
Preceded by FaZe Clan	Six Invitational winner 2026	Succeeded by TBD
