= 2020 Atlanta FaZe season =

- Head coach: James "Crowder" Crowder
- Owner: Paul Hamilton

Results
- Record: 26-7 (.788)
- Homestand wins: 2
- Place: 1st
- Season Playoffs: Grand Finals
- Total Earnings: $1,140,000

The 2020 Atlanta FaZe season was the first season of the Atlanta FaZe's existence in the Call of Duty League.

== Preceding offseason ==
On May 2, 2019, Activision Blizzard announced that Atlanta Esports Ventures had purchased one of the first five franchise slots for the Call of Duty League. AEV and FaZe Clan partnered together for the team, and in October 2019, they announced that the team would be named the Atlanta FaZe. Atlanta would announce its inaugural season roster the same month.

== Overview ==
Atlanta Faze would finish the regular season in first place with a 26 - 7 (.788) record, this granted them a 2-round bye and placed them in to winners bracket round 3. The team finished in second, earning them $900,000 in prize money. The team played with a starting roster of aBeZy, Cellium, MajorManiak, Priestahh, DZscopes and Simp at Playoffs.

== Final roster ==
Atlanta FaZe roster
Players
Coaches

| Handle | Name | Nationality |
|---|---|---|
| aBeZy | Pharris, Tyler | United States |
| Cellium | Jovel, McArthur | United States |
| GRVTY (TW) | Malin, Thomas | United States |
| JurNii (TW) | Antonio González, Juan | Spain |
| MajorManiak | Szymaniak, Michael | United States |
| Priestahh | Greiner, Prestion | United States |
| Simp | Osborne, Owen | United States |

Head coach

- James "Crowder" Crowder

Assistant coach(es)

- Richard "RJ" Simoncelli

Legend:
- (I) Inactive
- (S) Suspended
- Substitute
- (injured) Injury / Illness

Roster

== Standings ==
2020 Call of Duty League standings
| # | Team | Pts | EP | MW | ML | M% | GW | GL | G% |
|---|---|---|---|---|---|---|---|---|---|
2-round bye
| 1 | Atlanta FaZe | 280 | 9 | 26 | 7 | .788 | 86 | 46 | .652 |
| 2 | Dallas Empire | 260 | 9 | 23 | 12 | .657 | 80 | 55 | .593 |
1-round bye
| 3 | Florida Mutineers | 230 | 9 | 20 | 11 | .645 | 69 | 61 | .531 |
| 4 | Chicago Huntsmen | 230 | 9 | 21 | 9 | .700 | 75 | 44 | .630 |
1st round winners bracket
| 5 | New York Subliners | 140 | 9 | 13 | 17 | .433 | 57 | 60 | .487 |
| 6 | London Royal Ravens | 120 | 9 | 12 | 14 | .462 | 50 | 58 | .463 |
| 7 | Toronto Ultra | 120 | 9 | 11 | 13 | .458 | 49 | 55 | .471 |
| 8 | Minnesota ROKKR | 120 | 9 | 12 | 16 | .429 | 50 | 62 | .446 |
1st round losers bracket
| 9 | OpTic Gaming Los Angeles | 100 | 9 | 10 | 17 | .370 | 49 | 58 | .458 |
| 10 | Paris Legion | 100 | 9 | 10 | 16 | .385 | 44 | 57 | .436 |
| 11 | Seattle Surge | 50 | 9 | 5 | 16 | .238 | 32 | 53 | .376 |
| 12 | Los Angeles Guerrillas | 50 | 9 | 5 | 17 | .227 | 30 | 53 | .361 |

== Game log ==
=== Regular season ===
2020 regular season game log
Launch Weekend

| 1 | Atlanta FaZe | 3 | – | 0 | Dallas Empire | Minneapolis, MN |
| | | | | | | Minneapolis Armory |
| | 250 | Azhir Cave - Hardpoint | | | 234 | |
| | 6 | Arklov Peak - Search & Destroy | | | 0 | |
| | 188 | Gun Runner - Domination | | | 119 | |

| 2 | New York | 1 | – | 3 | Atlanta FaZe | Minneapolis, MN |
| | | | | | | Minneapolis Armory |
| | 211 | Gun Runner - Hardpoint | | | 250 | |
| | 0 | Piccadilly - Search & Destroy | | | 6 | |
| | 206 | Hackney Yard - Domination | | | 136 | |
| | 122 | St Petrograd - Hardpoint | | | 250 | |

Atlanta Faze Home Series

| Game 1 | Atlanta FaZe | 3 | – | 0 | OpTic Gaming Los Angeles | Atlanta, GA |
| | | | | | | Gateway Center Arena |
| | 250 | Azhir Cave - Hardpoint | | | 121 | |
| | 6 | Arklov Peak - Search & Destroy | | | 3 | |
| | 162 | St Petrograd - Domination | | | 143 | |

| Game 2 | London Royal Ravens | 1 | – | 3 | Atlanta FaZe | Atlanta, GA |
| | | | | | | Gateway Center Arena |
| | 195 | Hakney Hard - Hardpoint | | | 250 | |
| | 3 | Arklov Peak - Search & Destroy | | | 6 | |
| | 146 | St Petrograd - Domination | | | 132 | |
| | 189 | Gun Runner - Hardpoint | | | 250 | |

| Semi-finals | Atlanta FaZe | 3 | – | 2 | Minnesota ROKKR | Atlanta, GA |
| | | | | | | Gateway Center Arena |
| | 211 | Hackney Yard - Hardpoint | | | 250 | |
| | 2 | Piccadilly - Search & Destroy | | | 6 | |
| | 168 | Hackney Yard - Domination | | | 139 | |
| | 250 | Gun Runner - Hardpoint | | | 205 | |
| | 6 | Gun Runner - Search & Destroy | | | 4 | |

| Finals | Atlanta FaZe | 3 | – | 0 | Florida Mutineers | Atlanta, GA |
| | | | | | | Gateway Center Arena |
| | 250 | St Petrograd - Hardpoint | | | 138 | |
| | 6 | Gun Runner - Search & Destroy | | | 4 | |
| | 146 | St Petrograd - Domination | | | 136 | |

=== Playoffs ===
2020 playoff game log
Playoffs

| Winners round 3 | Atlanta FaZe | 3 | – | 2 | Chicago Huntsmen | Online |
| | | | | | | Online |

| Winners finals | Atlanta FaZe | 2 | – | 3 | Dallas Empire | Online |
| | | | | | | Online |

| Losers finals | Atlanta FaZe | 3 | – | 1 | Chicago Huntsmen | Online |
| | | | | | | Online |

| Grand Finals | August 30 | Dallas Empire | 5 | – | 1 | Atlanta FaZe | Online |
| | 4:00 pm EDT (20:00 UTC) | Details | | | | | |
| | | 250 | Azhir Cave - Hardpoint | | | 173 | |
| | | 6 | Gun Runner - Search & Destroy | | | 3 | |
| | | 158 | St. Petrograd - Domination | | | 152 | |
| | | 211 | Gun Runner - Hardpoint | | | 250 | |
| | | 6 | Rammaza - Search & Destroy | | | 4 | |
