= 2020 Chicago Huntsmen season =

- Head coach: Troy "Sender" Michaels
- General manager: Hector "HECZ" Rodriguez
- Owner: Andy Miller
- Arena(s): Wintrust Arena

Results
- Record: 24-11 (.686)
- Homestand wins: 2 (London, Seattle)
- Place: 4th
- Season Playoffs: 3rd
- Total Earnings: $760,000

The 2020 Chicago Huntsmen was the first season for NRG Esports in the Call of Duty League.

== Overview ==
On October 24, 2019, the 5 man starting roster was announced, including the stars of the former OpTic roster, Seth "Scump" Abner and Matthew "FormaL" Piper. They were joined by recent World Champion Alec "Arcitys" Sanderson. Dylan "Envoy" Hannon and Pierce "Gunless" Hillman rounded off the 5-man starting roster. Marcus "MBoZe" Blanks and Jordon "General" General were named as substitutes with Troy "Sender" Michaels being named Head Coach.

The team was supposed to host their first Home Series of the 2020 CDL season on April 4 at Wintrust Arena, but due to the COVID-19 pandemic the event along with the league was moved online. The Huntsmen ended up coming in 3rd-4th, as the Dallas Empire won the Home Series.

In the inaugural CDL season, the Huntsmen finished the regular season with a record of 24-11 and placed 3rd at CoD Champs. The Huntsmen won the London Home Series after defeating the Dallas Empire 3–0. The Huntsmen also won the Seattle Home Series, their first event with Preston "Prestinni" Sanderson (the twin brother of Arcitys) after Gunless was dropped to the substitutes.

== Final roster ==
2020 Chicago Huntsmen roster
Players
Coaches

Handle	Name	Nationality
Scump	Abner, Seth	United States
FormaL	Piper, Matthew	United States
Arcitys	Sanderson, Alec	United States
Envoy	Hannon, Dylan	United States
Prestinni	Sanderson, Preston	United States
General	General, Jordon	United States
Gunless	Hillman, Pierce	Canada
MBoZe	Blanks Jr., Marcus	United States

Head coach

- Troy "Sender" Michaels

Legend:
- (I) Inactive
- (S) Suspended
- Substitute
- (injured) Injury / Illness

Latest roster transaction: May 18, 2020.

== Standings ==
2020 Call of Duty League standings
#	Team	Pts	EP	MW	ML	M%	GW	GL	G%
2-round bye
1	Atlanta FaZe	280	9	26	7	.788	86	46	.652
2	Dallas Empire	260	9	23	12	.657	80	55	.593
1-round bye
3	Florida Mutineers	230	9	20	11	.645	69	61	.531
4	Chicago Huntsmen	230	9	21	9	.700	75	44	.630
1st round winners bracket
5	New York Subliners	140	9	13	17	.433	57	60	.487
6	London Royal Ravens	120	9	12	14	.462	50	58	.463
7	Toronto Ultra	120	9	11	13	.458	49	55	.471
8	Minnesota ROKKR	120	9	12	16	.429	50	62	.446
1st round losers bracket
9	OpTic Gaming Los Angeles	100	9	10	17	.370	49	58	.458
10	Paris Legion	100	9	10	16	.385	44	57	.436
11	Seattle Surge	50	9	5	16	.238	32	53	.376
12	Los Angeles Guerrillas	50	9	5	17	.227	30	53	.361

== Matches ==
2020 regular season game log
Launch Weekend

1	January 24	Chicago Huntsmen	3	–	1	Dallas Empire	Minnesota
	4:30 pm CST						Minneapolis Armory
		250	HP- Azhir Cave			209	
		1	S&D- Arklov Peak			6	
		202	DOM- Hackney			157	
		250	HP- Gun Runner			173	
		-	S&D- Piccadilly			-	

2	January 26	Chicago Huntsmen	3	–	0	OpTic Gaming Los Angeles	Minnesota
	3:00 pm CST						Minneapolis Armory
		250	HP- Azhir Cave			176	
		6	S&D- Piccadilly			2	
		193	DOM- Hackney			186	
		-	HP- St. Petrograd			-	
		-	S&D- St. Petrograd			-	

London Home Series

Group A	February 8	Chicago Huntsmen	3	–	0	Los Angeles Guerrillas	London
	2:00 pm GMT						Copper Box Arena
		250	HP- Gun Runner			158	
		6	S&D- St. Petrograd			3	
		169	DOM- Hackney			167	
		-	HP- St. Petrograd			-	
		-	S&D- Arklov Peak			-	

Group A WR1	February 8	Dallas Empire	1	–	3	Chicago Huntsmen	London
	5:30 pm GMT						Copper Box Arena
		151	HP- Gun Runner			250	
		5	S&D- Piccadilly			6	
		210	DOM- Hackney			160	
		175	HP- St. Petrograd			250	
		-	S&D- Gun Runner			-	

SF	February 9	Chicago Huntsmen	3	–	2	Paris Legion	London
	7:30 pm GMT						Copper Box Arena
		216	HP- Hackney			250	
		6	S&D- St. Petrograd			2	
		215	DOM- St. Petro			110	
		239	HP- Gun Runner			250	
		6	S&D- Arklov Peak			0	

Final	February 9	Chicago Huntsmen	3	–	0	Dallas Empire	London
	10:00 pm GMT						Copper Box Arena
		250	HP- Azhir Cave			239	
		6	S&D- Arklov Peak			5	
		190	DOM- St. Petro			156	
		-	HP- Hackney			-	
		-	S&D- Piccadilly			-	

Atlanta Home Series

Group B	February 22	Chicago Huntsmen	3	–	2	Toronto Ultra	Atlanta
	1:00 pm EST						Gateway Center Arena
		250	HP- Hackney			203	
		1	S&D- Piccadilly			6	
		204	DOM- St. Petro			114	
		162	HP- Gun Runner			250	
		6	S&D- Gun Runner			5	

Group B WR1	February 22	Minnesota ROKKR	1	–	3	Chicago Huntsmen	Atlanta
	4:30 pm EST						Gateway Center Arena
		250	HP- St. Petrograd			107	
		3	S&D- Gun Runner			6	
		145	DOM- Hackney			153	
		189	HP- Gun Runner			250	
		-	S&D- St. Petro			-	

SF	February 23	Chicago Huntsmen	2	–	3	Florida Mutineers	Atlanta
	3:30 pm EST						Gateway Center Arena
		250	HP- Azhir Cave			241	
		6	S&D- Arklov Peak			4	
		121	DOM- St. Petro			167	
		186	HP- Hackney			250	
		2	S&D- Gun Runner			6	

Dallas Home Series

Group B	April 10	Chicago Huntsmen	3	–	0	Minnesota ROKKR	Online
	8:00 pm CDT						
		250	HP- Rammaza			239	
		6	S&D- St. Petro			5	
		150	DOM- Gun Runner			143	
		-	HP- Gun Runner			-	
		-	S&D- Gun Runner			-	

Group B WR1	April 11	Paris Legion	1	–	3	Chicago Huntsmen	Online
	12:00 noon CDT						
		250	HP- Hackney Yard			230	
		4	S&D- St. Petro			6	
		147	DOM- Hackney			174	
		231	HP- St. Petro			250	
		-	S&D- Arklov Peak			-	

SF	April 12	Chicago Huntsmen	1	–	3	Florida Mutineers	Online
	5:00 pm CDT						
		250	HP- Gun Runner			199	
		4	S&D- Piccadilly			6	
		123	DOM- Hackney			192	
		222	HP- Azhir Cave			250	
		-	S&D- St. Petro			-	

Chicago Huntsmen Home Series

Group A	April 24	Chicago Huntsmen	2	–	3	New York Subliners	Online
	7:30 pm CDT						
		135	HP- Gun Runner			250	
		5	S&D- St. Petrograd			6	
		156	DOM- Gun Runner			150	
		250	HP- Hackney Yard			228	
		3	S&D- Ramazza			6	

Group A LR1	April 25	London Royal Ravens	1	–	3	Chicago Huntsmen	Online
	4:30 pm CDT						
		243	HP- St. Petro			250	
		1	S&D- Gun Runner			6	
		195	DOM- St. Petro			102	
		235	HP-Azhir Cave			250	
		-	S&D- Ramazza			-	

Group A LR2	April 25	New York Subliners	1	–	3	Chicago Huntsmen	Online
	7:30 pm CDT						
		250	HP- Gun Runner			195	
		3	S&D- Arklov Peak			6	
		156	DOM- Hackney			158	
		167	HP-St. Petrograd			250	
		-	S&D- Gun Runner			-	

SF	April 26	Dallas Empire	3	–	0	Chicago Huntsmen	Online
	4:30 pm CDT						
		250	HP- Rammaza			165	
		6	S&D- Gun Runner			2	
		165	DOM- Hackney			158	
		-	HP-Hackney			-	
		-	S&D- Arklov Peak			-	

Seattle Home Series

Group B	May 22	Paris Legion	1	–	3	Chicago Huntsmen	Online
	1:00 pm PDT						
		203	HP- Azhir Cave			250	
		2	S&D- St. Petro			6	
		171	DOM- Gun Runner			136	
		236	HP- Hackney			250	
		-	S&D- Gun Runner			-	

Group B WR1	May 23	Chicago Huntsmen	3	–	0	Paris Legion	Online
	10:00 am PDT						
		250	HP- Azhir Cave			233	
		6	S&D- Gun Runner			5	
		176	DOM- Hackney			123	
		-	HP- St. Petro			-	
		-	S&D- Arklov Peak			-	

SF	May 24	Chicago Huntsmen	3	–	1	New York Subliners	Online
	2:30 pm PDT						
		250	HP- Rammaza			209	
		6	S&D- Gun Runner			3	
		125	DOM- Hackney			177	
		250	HP- Hackney			201	
		-	S&D- Arklov Peak			-	

Final	May 24	London Royal Ravens	1	–	3	Chicago Huntsmen	Online
	4:00 pm PDT						
		202	HP- Rammaza			250	
		6	S&D- Arklov Peak			2	
		154	DOM- Gun Runner			155	
		160	HP- Hackney			250	
		-	S&D- Gun Runner			-	
