= 2020 Call of Duty League season =

2020 Call of Duty League Season
- League: Call of Duty League
- Sport: Call of Duty: Modern Warfare
- Duration: January 24 – July 25, 2020
- Teams: 12

Regular Season
- Top seed: Atlanta Faze
- Season MVP: Anthony "Shotzzy" Cuevas-Castro

Grand Finals
- Champions: Dallas Empire
- Runners-up: Atlanta Faze
- Finals MVP: Ian "Crimsix" Porter

Seasons
- 2021 →

The 2020 Call of Duty League season was the inaugural season for the Call of Duty League, an esports league based on the video game franchise Call of Duty.

== Teams ==
Team	Location	Venue(s)	Joined	Owner
Atlanta FaZe	(United States) Atlanta, GA	Gateway Center Arena	2020	Atlanta Esports Ventures, FaZe Clan
Chicago Huntsmen	(United States) Chicago, IL	Wintrust Arena	2020	NRG Esports
Dallas Empire	(United States) Dallas, TX	Toyota Music Factory	2020	Envy Gaming
Florida Mutineers	(United States) Orlando, FL	Addition Financial Arena	2020	Misfits Gaming
London Royal Ravens	(United Kingdom) London, UK	Copper Box Arena	2020	ReKTGlobal, Inc.
Los Angeles Guerrillas	(United States) Los Angeles, CA	Shrine Exposition Hall	2020	Kroenke Sports & Entertainment
OpTic Gaming Los Angeles	(United States) Los Angeles, CA	Shrine Exposition Hall	2020	Immortals Gaming Club
Minnesota ROKKR	(United States) Minneapolis, MN	Mystic Lake Casino Hotel	2020	WISE Ventures
New York Subliners	(United States) New York City, NY	Kings Theatre	2020	Andbox
Paris Legion	Paris, France	La Seine Musicale	2020	c0ntact Gaming
Seattle Surge	(United States) Seattle, WA	WaMu Theater	2020	Canucks Sports & Entertainment, Enthusiast Gaming
Toronto Ultra	(Canada) Toronto, ON	Mattamy Athletic Centre	2020	OverActive Media

== Broadcast and viewership ==
The Call of Duty League began a partnership with YouTube to become the exclusive streaming service for the league. At least 331,000 viewers watched the grand final of the CDL championship.

On July 4, Philip "Momo" Whitfield was fired from the league after several allegations of sexual misconduct surfaced on the internet. Ten days later, Ben "Benson" Bowe revealed he's no longer working with the league. Although his legal counsel "advised him not to say why", some reported it was due to similar reasons to Momo. Thomas "Chance" Ashworth worked with Miles Ross for the rest of the season. On July 10, the league added Landon "LandO" Sanders and Jeremy "StuDyy" Astacio to become the third casting pair in the wake of Momo and Benson departing.

== Regular season standings ==
2020 Call of Duty League standings
#	Team	Pts	EP	MW	ML	M%	GW	GL	G%
2-round bye
1	Atlanta FaZe	280	9	26	7	.788	86	46	.652
2	Dallas Empire	260	9	23	12	.657	80	55	.593
1-round bye
3	Florida Mutineers	230	9	20	11	.645	69	61	.531
4	Chicago Huntsmen	230	9	21	9	.700	75	44	.630
1st round winners bracket
5	New York Subliners	140	9	13	17	.433	57	60	.487
6	London Royal Ravens	120	9	12	14	.462	50	58	.463
7	Toronto Ultra	120	9	11	13	.458	49	55	.471
8	Minnesota ROKKR	120	9	12	16	.429	50	62	.446
1st round losers bracket
9	OpTic Gaming Los Angeles	100	9	10	17	.370	49	58	.458
10	Paris Legion	100	9	10	16	.385	44	57	.436
11	Seattle Surge	50	9	5	16	.238	32	53	.376
12	Los Angeles Guerrillas	50	9	5	17	.227	30	53	.361

== Regular season ==
=== CDL 2020 Launch Weekend ===
Day 1 Results
Home	Result		Away
Chicago Huntsmen	3	1	Dallas Empire
Seattle Surge	2	3	Florida Mutineers
Los Angeles Guerrillas	1	3	Minnesota ROKKR

Day 2 Results
Home	Result		Away
New York Subliners	0	3	London Royal Ravens
Toronto Ultra	3	2	Seattle Surge
Los Angeles Guerrillas	3	2	Florida Mutineers
OpTic Gaming Los Angeles	2	3	Paris Legion
Atlanta Faze	3	0	Dallas Empire

Day 3 Results
Home	Result		Away
Paris Legion	3	0	London Royal Ravens
Chicago Huntsmen	3	0	OpTic Gaming Los Angeles
New York Subliners	1	3	Atlanta Faze
Toronto Ultra	1	3	Minnesota ROKKR

=== London Royal Ravens Home Series I ===
Teams not in attendance: Atlanta FaZe, Florida Mutineers, OpTic Gaming Los Angeles, Minnesota ROKKR.

Finals

Semifinals
Chicago Huntsmen	3
Paris Legion	2
London Royal Ravens	2
Dallas Empire	3

Finals
Chicago Huntsmen	3
Dallas Empire	0

=== Atlanta Faze Home Series ===
Teams not in attendance: Dallas Empire, Los Angeles Guerrillas, New York Subliners, Seattle Surge.

Finals

Semifinals
Atlanta FaZe	3
Minnesota ROKKR	2
Chicago Huntsmen	2
Florida Mutineers	3

Finals
Atlanta FaZe	3
Florida Mutineers	0

=== OpTic Gaming Los Angeles Home Series ===
Teams not in attendance: Chicago Huntsmen, London Royal Ravens, Paris Legion, Toronto Ultra.

Finals

Semifinals
OpTic Gaming Los Angeles	1
Dallas Empire	3
Atlanta FaZe	2
Minnesota ROKKR	3

Finals
Dallas Empire	3
Minnesota ROKKR	2

=== Dallas Empire Home Series ===
Teams not in attendance: Atlanta FaZe, London Royal Ravens, New York Subliners, OpTic Gaming Los Angeles.

Finals

Semifinals
Dallas Empire	1
Minnesota ROKKR	3
Chicago Huntsmen	1
Florida Mutineers	3

Finals
Minnesota ROKKR	1
Florida Mutineers	3

=== Chicago Huntsmen Home Series ===
Teams not in attendance: Florida Mutineers, Minnesota ROKKR, Paris Legion, Toronto Ultra.

Finals

Semifinals
Seattle Surge	1
Atlanta Faze	3
Dallas Empire	3
Chicago Huntsmen	0

Finals
Dallas Empire	3
Atlanta Faze	1

=== Florida Mutineers Home Series ===
Teams not in attendance: Chicago Huntsmen, Dallas Empire, Los Angeles Guerrillas, Seattle Surge.

Finals

Semifinals
OpTic Gaming Los Angeles	3
Toronto Ultra	2
Dallas Empire	2
Atlanta Faze	3

Finals
Atlanta Faze	3
OpTic Gaming Los Angeles	1

=== Seattle Surge Home Series ===
Teams not in attendance: Atlanta FaZe, Dallas Empire, Florida Mutineers, Toronto Ultra

Finals

Semifinals
London Royal Ravens	3
OpTic Gaming Los Angeles	2
Chicago Huntsmen	3
New York Subliners	1

Finals
London Royal Ravens	1
Chicago Huntsmen	3

=== Minnesota RØKKR Home Series ===
Teams not in attendance: London Royal Ravens, New York Subliners, OpTic Gaming Los Angeles, Paris Legion.

Finals

Semifinals
Florida Mutineers	3
Dallas Empire	2
Atlanta Faze	3
Los Angeles Guerrillas	2

Finals
Florida Mutineers	3
Atlanta Faze	1

=== Paris Legion Home Series ===
Teams not in attendance: Chicago Huntsmen, Los Angeles Guerrillas, Minnesota ROKKR, Seattle Surge.

Finals

Semifinals
Florida Mutineers	3
New York Subliners	2
Atlanta FaZe	3
Dallas Empire	2

Finals
Florida Mutineers	3
Atlanta FaZe	0

=== New York Subliners Home Series ===
Teams not in attendance: Dallas Empire, Florida Mutineers, OpTic Gaming Los Angeles, Seattle Surge.

Finals

Semifinals
Chicago Huntsmen	3
Atlanta FaZe	0
Toronto Ultra	0
New York Subliners	3

Finals
Chicago Huntsmen	0
New York Subliners	3

=== London Royal Ravens Home Series II ===
Teams not in attendance: Atlanta Faze, Chicago Huntsmen, Minnesota ROKKR, Toronto Ultra.

Finals

Semifinals
London Royal Ravens	2
Paris Legion	3
Dallas Empire	3
Florida Mutineers	0

Finals
Paris Legion	0
Dallas Empire	3

=== Toronto Ultra Home Series ===
Teams not in attendance: New York Subliners, London Royal Ravens, Paris Legion, Los Angeles Guerrillas.

Finals

Semifinals
Toronto Ultra	3
Dallas Empire	1
Atlanta Faze	3
OpTic Gaming Los Angeles	0

Finals
Toronto Ultra	3
Atlanta Faze	2

== Championship ==
The playoffs and 2020 Call of Duty League Championship began on August 19 and concluded on August 30, 2020. All twelve teams competed in the playoffs, and all matches were played online.

=== Bracket ===
Upper round 1	Upper round 2	Upper round 3	Upper final	Final
1	Atlanta FaZe	3
4	Chicago Huntsmen	3	4	Chicago Huntsmen	2
5	New York Subliners	3	5	New York Subliners	2	1	Atlanta FaZe	2
8	Minnesota ROKKR	1	2	Dallas Empire	3
2	Dallas Empire	3
3	Florida Mutineers	1	7	Toronto Ultra	2
6	London Royal Ravens	1	7	Toronto Ultra	3
7	Toronto Ultra	3	2	Dallas Empire	5
1	Atlanta FaZe	1
Lower round 1	Lower round 2	Lower round 3	Lower round 4	Lower round 5	Lower final
4	Chicago Huntsmen	3
3	Florida Mutineers	0	9	OpTic Los Angeles	2	1	Atlanta FaZe	3
8	Minnesota ROKKR	0	9	OpTic Los Angeles	3	4	Chicago Huntsmen	3	4	Chicago Huntsmen	1
9	OpTic Los Angeles	3	9	OpTic Los Angeles	3	6	London Royal Ravens	1
12	Los Angeles Guerrillas	2	7	Toronto Ultra	1
5	New York Subliners	2	6	London Royal Ravens	3
6	London Royal Ravens	3	6	London Royal Ravens	3
10	Paris Legion	3	10	Paris Legion	1
11	Seattle Surge	0

=== Grand finals ===
Best-of-9 with the team from the Winner's Bracket (WB) starting the match up 1–0.

Grand Finals	August 30	Dallas Empire	5	–	1	Atlanta Faze	Online
	4:00 pm EDT (20:00 UTC)	Details					
		250	Azhir Cave - Hardpoint			173	
		6	Gun Runner - Search & Destroy			3	
		158	St. Petrograd - Domination			152	
		211	Gun Runner - Hardpoint			250	
		6	Rammaza - Search & Destroy			4	

== Winnings ==
Teams in the 2020 season competed for a prize pool of US$4.6 million in the playoffs, with the payout detailed below.

#	Team	Prize money
1	Dallas Empire	$1,500,000
2	Atlanta Faze	$900,000
3	Chicago Huntsmen	$600,000
4	London Royal Ravens	$450,000
5/6	OpTic Gaming Los Angeles	$300,000
5/6	Toronto Ultra	$300,000
7/8	Florida Mutineers	$175,000
7/8	New York Subliners	$175,000
9/10	Minnesota RØKKR	$100,000
9/10	Paris Legion	$100,000
11/12	Los Angeles Guerrillas	$0
11/12	Seattle Surge	$0
