= 2024 Esports World Cup – Call of Duty: Modern Warfare III =

Call of Duty: MWIII tournament at the 2024 Esports World Cup

Call of Duty: Modern Warfare III at the 2024 Esports World Cup
Tournament information
- Sport: Call of Duty: Modern Warfare III
- Location: Saudi Arabia
- Dates: August 15–August 18
- Administrator: Esports World Cup Foundation; Supervised by ESL and endorsed by Activision
- Tournament format(s): 16-team GSL-style group stage 8-team single elimination bracket
- Venue: 1 (in 1 host city)
- Teams: 16

Final positions
- Champion: Atlanta FaZe
- Runner-up: 100 Thieves
- MVP: McArthur "Cellium" Jovel (Atlanta FaZe)

The first-person shooter video game Call of Duty: Modern Warfare III was present for a tournament at the 2024 Esports World Cup, held in Riyadh, Saudi Arabia, on August 15 to August 18, 2024. Sixteen teams took part in this tournament, including eleven of the twelve teams in the Call of Duty League, four teams from Challengers and a team from a MENA qualifier.

The Atlanta FaZe defeated 100 Thieves (representing the Los Angeles Thieves) to win the tournament and $600,000. OpTic Texas, who were crowned 2024 CDL champions and were represented by their parent organization OpTic Gaming, lost to the eventual champions in the semi-finals.

== Background ==
In October 2023, Saudi Arabia announced the inaugural Esports World Cup as the successor of Gamers8, the Saudi Esports Federation's previously existing esports festival, set to take place in Riyadh. The event was developed as a part of Saudi Arabia's Vision 2030, a plan led by Crown Prince Mohammed bin Salman aimed at diversifying the country's economy and reducing reliance on oil.

Call of Duty content creators were involved in the promotion of the Esports World Cup since October 2023, most notably Scump. However, both Warzone and Modern Warfare III, the two then-current CoD titles, were revealed on June 12, 2024, as the twentieth and twenty-first games that would be at the event; they would also be the last titles announced that would award Club Championship points. Due to the timing of the announcements coming close to the roster acquisition deadline, which was set for June 13, organizations were given two extra weeks to sign teams in both Call of Duty titles.

== Format ==
The 16 teams who qualify for the tournament will be placed into 4 GSL-style groups of 4 teams, with each match being a best-of-5 map series. The winners and runners-up of each group will advance to a single elimination playoff bracket. The quarter-finals and semi-finals consist of best-of-5 map series, while the grand final is best-of-7.

The top 8 teams at the tournament (those who qualify for the playoffs) will gain Esports World Cup Club Championship points. Each organization will be able to qualify for the Club Championship itself if they place in the top 8 in another EWC event, with the winning team's organization able to win the Club Championship as well if they also place in the top 8 of another event.

== Qualified teams ==
Sixteen teams qualified for the tournament. Eleven of the twelve teams that made up the 2024 Call of Duty League season were invited to the event, with special seeding given to 7 of the teams that made up Championship Weekend, which was held in July; only the Los Angeles Guerrillas, who qualified for Championship Weekend, declined an invite. The top four teams from the Challengers Finals, the season-ending championship of the tier-2 Challengers league, qualified for the event, while one team qualified via the Middle East and North Africa (MENA) qualifier.

=== CDL Teams ===
- 100 Thieves (Note: The Los Angeles Thieves will play as 100 Thieves, their parent organization, for the Esports World Cup.)
- Atlanta FaZe
- Boston Breach
- Carolina Royal Ravens (Note: The Carolina Royal Ravens were initially going to play as ReKTGlobal, their parent organization.)
- Cloud9 (Note: Cloud9 signed the New York Subliners roster (later renamed Cloud9 New York) for the Esports World Cup on June 27.)
- G2 Esports (Note: The Minnesota RØKKR will play as G2 Esports, their parent organization, for the Esports World Cup.)
- OpTic Gaming (Note: OpTic Texas will play as OpTic Gaming, their parent organization, for the Esports World Cup.)
- Team Heretics (Note: The Miami Heretics will play as Team Heretics, their parent organization, for the Esports World Cup.)
- Toronto Ultra
- Vancouver Surge (Note: Formerly known as the Seattle Surge.)
- Vegas Legion

=== Challengers Teams ===
- Gentle Mates (Note: Qualified as Clutch Rayn x WaR)
- Lore Gaming
- OMiT Brooklyn
- Stallions (Note: Qualified as FC Black, the academy team of Atlanta FaZe)
- Team Falcons (Note: Qualified via the Middle East and North Africa (MENA) qualifier.)

== Group stage ==
This stage will be held on August 15 and 16, 2024. All start times are listed in Arabia Standard Time (AST, UTC+03:00).

Group A

Opening Matches
August 15, 3:00 p.m.
OpTic Gaming	3
OMiT Brooklyn	1
August 15, 3:00 p.m.
Vegas Legion	0
Carolina Royal Ravens	3
Elimination Match
August 15, 9:00 p.m.
OMiT Brooklyn	1
Vegas Legion	3

Winner's Match
August 16, 5:00 p.m.
OpTic Gaming	3
Carolina Royal Ravens	1
Decider Match
August 16, 10:00 p.m.
Carolina Royal Ravens	3
Vegas Legion	1

Advance to Knockout stage
A1	OpTic Gaming
A2	Carolina Royal Ravens

Group B

Opening Matches
August 15, 4:30 p.m.
Cloud9	3
Gentle Mates	1
August 15, 4:30 p.m.
Vancouver Surge	3
G2 Esports	0
Elimination Match
August 15, 9:00 p.m.
Gentle Mates	3
G2 Esports	2

Winner's Match
August 16, 5:00 p.m.
Cloud9	1
Vancouver Surge	3
Decider Match
August 16, 9:00 p.m.
Cloud9	3
Gentle Mates	1

Advance to Knockout stage
B1	Vancouver Surge
B2	Cloud9

Group C

Opening Matches
August 15, 6:00 p.m.
Toronto Ultra	3
Stallions	0
August 15, 6:00 p.m.
Team Heretics	1
Boston Breach	3
Elimination Match
August 15, 10:30 p.m.
Stallions	3
Team Heretics	0

Winner's Match
August 16, 6:30 p.m.
Toronto Ultra	3
Boston Breach	1
Decider Match
August 16, 9:30 p.m.
Boston Breach	3
Stallions	0

Advance to Knockout stage
C1	Toronto Ultra
C2	Boston Breach

Group D

Opening Matches
August 15, 7:30 p.m.
100 Thieves	3
Lore Gaming	1
August 15, 7:30 p.m.
Atlanta FaZe	3
Team Falcons	0
Elimination Match
August 15, 10:30 p.m.
Lore Gaming	3
Team Falcons	2

Winner's Match
August 16, 6:30 p.m.
100 Thieves	0
Atlanta FaZe	3
Decider Match
August 16, 9:30 p.m.
100 Thieves	3
Lore Gaming	0

Advance to Knockout stage
D1	Atlanta FaZe
D2	100 Thieves

== Playoffs ==
All start times are listed in Arabia Standard Time (AST, UTC+03:00).

Quarterfinals (Best-of-5)
August 17, 9:30 p.m.
A1	OpTic Gaming	3
B2	Cloud9	1
August 17, 6:30 p.m.
D1	Atlanta FaZe	3
C2	Boston Breach	0
August 17, 8:00 p.m.
C1	Toronto Ultra	2
D2	100 Thieves	3
August 17, 5 p.m.
B1	Vancouver Surge	3
A2	Carolina Royal Ravens	2

Semifinals (Best-of-5)
August 18, 5:00 p.m.
A1	OpTic Gaming	1
D1	Atlanta FaZe	3
August 18, 6:30 p.m.
D2	100 Thieves	3
B1	Vancouver Surge	0

Grand Finals (Best-of-7)
August 18, 8:30 p.m.
D1	Atlanta FaZe	4
D2	100 Thieves	2

== Ranking ==
Place	Team	GS	QF	SF	Finals	Prize (%)	Prize (USD)	EWC Points
1st	Atlanta FaZe	2-0	3-0	3-1	4-2	33.3%	$600,000	1000 (Note: Atlanta FaZe's points went to FaZe Clan, their parent organization.)
2nd	100 Thieves	2-1	3-2	3-0	2-4	17.8%	$320,000	600
3rd–4th	OpTic Gaming	2-0	3-1	1-3		8.9%	$160,000	275
3rd–4th	Vancouver Surge	2-0	3-2	0-3		8.9%	$160,000	275
5th–8th	Cloud9	2-1	1-3			4.4%	$80,000	60
5th–8th	Boston Breach	2-1	0-3			4.4%	$80,000	60
5th–8th	Toronto Ultra	2-0	2-3			4.4%	$80,000	60
5th–8th	Carolina Royal Ravens	2-1	2-3			4.4%	$80,000	60
9th-12th	Vegas Legion	1–2				2.2%	$40,000	0
9th-12th	Gentle Mates	1–2				2.2%	$40,000	0
9th-12th	Stallions	1–2				2.2%	$40,000	0
9th-12th	Lore Gaming	1–2				2.2%	$40,000	0
13th-16th	OMiT Brooklyn	0–2				1.1%	$20,000	0
13th-16th	G2 Esports	0–2				1.1%	$20,000	0
13th-16th	Team Heretics	0–2				1.1%	$20,000	0
13th-16th	Team Falcons	0–2				1.1%	$20,000	0
Place	Team	GS	QF	SF	Finals	Prize (%)	Prize (USD)	EWC Points
