= 2020 Los Angeles Guerrillas season =

- Head coach: Embry Bevils

Results
- Record: 5–17 (.227)
- Homestand wins: 0
- Place: 12th
- Season Playoffs: Lower round 1
- Total Earnings: $10,000

The 2020 Los Angeles Guerrillas season was the first season of the Los Angeles Guerrillas' existence in the Call of Duty League. Los Angeles Guerrillas would finish the regular season in twelfth place with a 5 – 17 (.227) record, this placed them in losers round 1 of the playoffs.

== Preceding offseason ==
On August 20, 2019, Activision Blizzard announced that Kroenke Sports & Entertainment had purchased one of the two new franchise slots for the Call of Duty League. On October 18, 2019, branding was revealed as the Los Angeles Guerrillas.

== Final roster ==
2020 Los Angeles Guerrillas roster
Players
Coaches

Handle	Name	Nationality
AquA	Silva, Ulysses	United States
Blazt	Ogresevic, Rasim	United States
Decemate	Cato, Jacob	United States
Lacefield	Lacefield, Andres	United States
Ricky	Stacy, Richard	United States
Saints	Reyna, Renato	Peru
Spart	Cervantez, Kris	United States
Vivid	Drost, Reece	United States

Head coach

- Embry Bevils

Assistant coach(es)

- Richard "Ricky" Stacy
- Doug Liebe

Legend:
- (I) Inactive
- (S) Suspended
- Substitute
- (injured) Injury / Illness

Latest roster transaction: July 22, 2020.

=== Transactions ===
Transactions of/for players on the roster during the 2020 regular season:

- On February 28, 2020, Guerrillas signed Spart and Vivid.
- On July 22, 2020, Aches left the team.

== Standings ==
2020 Call of Duty League standings
#	Team	Pts	EP	MW	ML	M%	GW	GL	G%
2-round bye
1	Atlanta FaZe	280	9	26	7	.788	86	46	.652
2	Dallas Empire	260	9	23	12	.657	80	55	.593
1-round bye
3	Florida Mutineers	230	9	20	11	.645	69	61	.531
4	Chicago Huntsmen	230	9	21	9	.700	75	44	.630
1st round winners bracket
5	New York Subliners	140	9	13	17	.433	57	60	.487
6	London Royal Ravens	120	9	12	14	.462	50	58	.463
7	Toronto Ultra	120	9	11	13	.458	49	55	.471
8	Minnesota ROKKR	120	9	12	16	.429	50	62	.446
1st round losers bracket
9	OpTic Gaming Los Angeles	100	9	10	17	.370	49	58	.458
10	Paris Legion	100	9	10	16	.385	44	57	.436
11	Seattle Surge	50	9	5	16	.238	32	53	.376
12	Los Angeles Guerrillas	50	9	5	17	.227	30	53	.361

== Game log ==
=== Regular season ===
2020 regular season game log
Launch Weekend

1	January 24	Los Angeles Guerrillas	1	–	3	Minnesota ROKKR	Minneapolis, MN
							Minneapolis Armory

2	January 25	Los Angeles Guerrillas	3	–	2	Florida Mutineers	Minneapolis, MN
							Minneapolis Armory

London Royal Ravens Home Series

Group upper round 1	February 8	Los Angeles Guerrillas	0	–	3	Chicago Huntsmen	London, UK
							Copper Box Arena

Group lower round 1	February 9	Los Angeles Guerrillas	2	–	3	Seattle Surge	London, UK
							Copper Box Arena

Los Angeles Home Series

Group upper round 1	March 7	OpTic Gaming Los Angeles	3	–	2	Los Angeles Guerrillas	Los Angeles, CA
							Shrine Expo Hall

Group lower round 1	March 8	Los Angeles Guerrillas	0	–	3	Seattle Surge	Los Angeles, CA
							Shrine Expo Hall

Dallas Empire Home Series

Group upper round 1	April 10	Los Angeles Guerrillas	1	–	3	Dallas Empire	Online
							Online

Group lower round 1	April 11	Los Angeles Guerrillas	1	–	3	Florida Mutineers	Online
							Online

Chicago Huntsmen Home Series

Group upper round 1	April 24	Los Angeles Guerrillas	0	–	3	Seattle Surge	Online
							Online

Group lower round 1	April 25	OpTic Gaming Los Angeles	1	–	3	Los Angeles Guerrillas	Online
							Online

Group lower round 2	April 25	Los Angeles Guerrillas	1	–	3	Seattle Surge	Online
							Online

Seattle Surge Home Series

Group upper round 1	May 22	Los Angeles Guerrillas	2	–	3	London Royal Ravens	Online
							Online

Group lower round 1	May 23	Seattle Surge	1	–	3	Los Angeles Guerrillas	Online
							Online

Group lower round 2	May 23	Los Angeles Guerrillas	1	–	3	New York Subliners	Online
							Online

Minnesota RØKKR Home Series

Group upper round 1	June 12	Toronto Ultra	2	–	3	Los Angeles Guerrillas	Online
							Online

Group upper round 2	June 13	Florida Mutineers	3	–	1	Los Angeles Guerrillas	Online
							Online

Group lower round 2	June 13	Chicago Huntsmen	2	–	3	Los Angeles Guerrillas	Online
							Online

Semifinals	June 14	Los Angeles Guerrillas	2	–	3	Atlanta FaZe	Online
							Online

New York Subliners Home Series

Group upper round 1	July 10	Los Angeles Guerrillas	1	–	3	Atlanta FaZe	Online
							Online

Group lower round 1	July 11	Los Angeles Guerrillas	0	–	3	Paris Legion	Online
							Online

London Royal Ravens Home Series

Group upper round 1	July 17	Los Angeles Guerrillas	0	–	3	New York Subliners	Online
							Online

Group lower round 1	July 18	Los Angeles Guerrillas	1	–	3	Paris Legion	Online
							Online

=== Playoffs ===
2020 playoff game log
Playoffs

Lower round 1	August 19	Los Angeles Guerrillas	2	–	3	OpTic Gaming Los Angeles	Online
		Details					Online
		250	Gun Runner – Hardpoint			217	
		4	Gun Runner – Search & Destroy			6	
		155	St Petrograd – Domination			169	
		250	St Petrograd – Hardpoint			151	
		4	Piccadilly – Search & Destroy			6	
