= OpTic Chicago =

American professional esports team

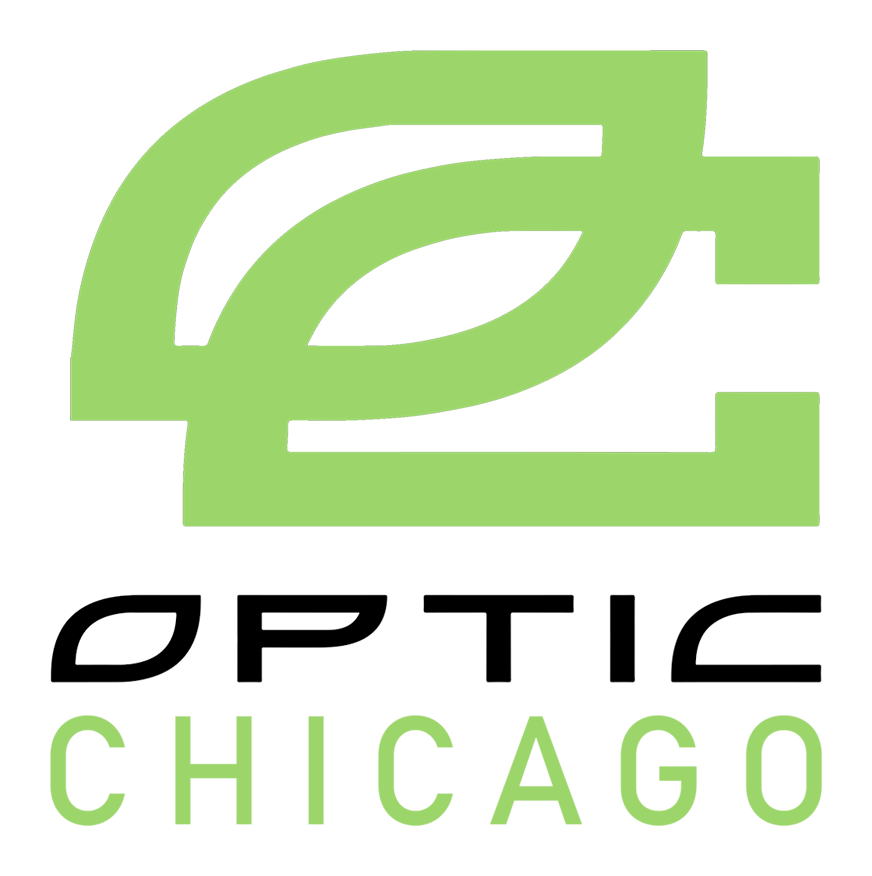
- Founded: September 13, 2019
- Folded: November 8, 2021
- League: Call of Duty League
- Team history: Chicago Huntsmen (2019–2020); OpTic Chicago (2020–2021)
- Based in: Chicago, Illinois, U.S.
- Colors
- Parent group: NRG Esports
- Website: optic.callofdutyleague.com/en-us

OpTic Chicago (formerly the Chicago Huntsmen) was an American professional Call of Duty League (CDL) esports team based in Chicago, Illinois. OpTic Chicago was owned by NRG Esports owned and run by Co-CEO's Andy Miller & OpTic Gaming owner Hector “H3CZ” Rodriguez.

== History ==
=== Chicago Huntsmen (2019–2020 season) ===
NRG announced that it had bought the Chicago slot in the Call of Duty League (CDL) on September 13, 2019, two days later Hector "H3CZ" Rodriguez joined from OpTic Gaming as the CEO and co-owner of the team. On October 24, 2019, the 5 man starting roster was announced, including the stars of the former OpTic roster, Seth "Scump" Abner and Matthew "FormaL" Piper. They were joined by recent World Champion Alec "Arcitys" Sanderson. Dylan "Envoy" Hannon and Pierce "Gunless" Hillman rounded off the 5-man starting roster. Marcus "MBoZe" Blanks and Jordon "General" General were named as substitutes with Troy "Sender" Michaels being named Head Coach.

In 2020, the Huntsmen announced sponsorship deals with Crep Protect, that will see the launch of a line of co-branded products between the team & sponsor as well as promotional content, and Zippo. The team was supposed to host their first Home Series of the 2020 CDL season on April 4 at Wintrust Arena, but due to the COVID-19 pandemic the event along with the league was moved online. The Huntsmen ended up coming in third-fourth, as the Dallas Empire won the Home Series.

In the inaugural CDL season, the Huntsmen finished the regular season with a record of 24-11 and placed third at CoD Champs. The Huntsmen won the London Home Series after defeating the Dallas Empire 3–0. The Huntsmen also won the Seattle Home Series, their first event with Preston "Prestinni" Sanderson (the twin brother of Arcitys) after Gunless was dropped to the substitutes.

=== OpTic Chicago (2020–2021 season) ===
On 11 November 2020, the team announced that it had rebranded from the Chicago Huntsmen to OpTic Chicago. Rodriguez reacquired the OpTic brand from Immortals Gaming Club, returning the brand to its roots.

After the rebrand to OpTic Chicago, the team announced they have brought in OpTic Gaming Los Angeles player Brandon "Dashy" Otell to join, Scump, FormaL, and Envoy, as the league announced its returning to the 4-v-4 format. Arcitys was allowed to leave to Atlanta FaZe and Gunless and Prestinni left to join the Seattle Surge. MBoZe was taken out of a substitution spot as he went back to only being a creator for OpTic Gaming. During the 2021 season the team failed to win a single major during and finished fifth/sixth during the Champions Weekend. At the end of the season Dylan "Envoy" Hannon was released from the team and Matthew "FormaL" Piper retired from competitive Call of Duty.

=== OpTic and Envy merger ===
On November 8, 2021, it was announced that OpTic Gaming would be merging with their new parent company Envy Gaming to found "OpTic Texas" for the Call of Duty: Vanguard season. The same date had the team announcing the roster for the upcoming CDL season which consists of the following players; Anthony "Shotzzy" Cuevas-Castro, Indervir "iLLeY" Dhaliwal, Seth "Scump" Abner, and Brandon "Dashy" Otell. Three of which are former world champions.

== Accomplishments ==
During their first match against the Minnesota RØKKR on the first day of the Dallas Empire Home Series tournament, the Chicago Huntsmen performed a "Full Sail," which occurs when a team that is down 0–5 in a search and destroy game goes on to win the next six consecutive rounds and thus win the game. The phrase "Full Sail" is an ode to Full Sail University, the venue of the Major League Gaming Fall Invitational 2013, at which the first 0-5 search and destroy comeback occurred during competitive play. The Huntsmen would go on to win the match 3–0.

== Controversies ==
During a February 16, 2020, Twitch stream titled "Back to the Kingdom," Ian "Crimsix" Porter, of Dallas Empire, accused the Huntsmen of using three stun grenades during their Grand Finals match at the London Royal Ravens Home Series. Porter claimed the use of three stun grenades went against a gentleman's agreement between the teams to use two stun grenades, two flash grenades, and one smoke grenade. The Huntsmen said the use of three stuns was an "honest mistake." Porter did not claim the use of three stuns materially affected the outcome of the game, and said he was unsure if the results would have been different had the gentlemen's agreement not been broken.
