= PrestonPlayz =

American YouTuber (born 1994)

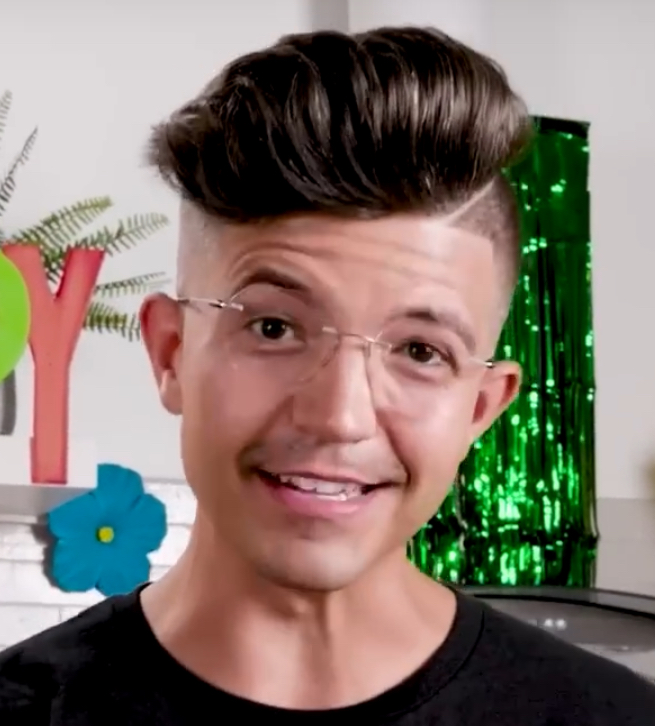
- Arsement in 2024
- Born: Preston Blaine Arsement; May 4, 1994 (age 32); Texas, U.S.
- Spouse: Brianna Arsement (m. 2018)

YouTube information
- Channels: Preston; PrestonPlayz; PrestonGamez
- Years active: 2010–present
- Genres: Gaming; challenge
- Subscribers: 32.1 million (Main channel); 17.5 million (PrestonPlayz); 4.9 million (PrestonGamez)
- Views: 13.33 billion (main channel); 8.37 billion (PrestonPlayz); 1.05 billion (PrestonGamez)
- Last updated: June 22, 2026
- Website: firemerch.com

Preston Blaine Arsement (born May 4, 1994), better known as PrestonPlayz, or TBNRfrags, is an American YouTuber. He is known for his videos playing video games including Minecraft, Roblox, and Fortnite, and his real-life vlogs and challenges.

== Early life ==
Preston Blaine Arsement was born on May 4, 1994, in Texas. He is the eldest of three half-siblings, two half-brothers and one half-sister. Arsement's father, David, is a United States Air Force veteran and the COO of Arsement's company, while his mother, Jaye, is the CEO; she formerly worked for AT&T and Southwestern Bell. The first game he played was Sonic the Hedgehog on the Sega Genesis, when he was four. Arsement was first inspired to pursue YouTube after watching HuskyStarcraft. As a teenager, he watched many RuneScape videos.

== Career ==
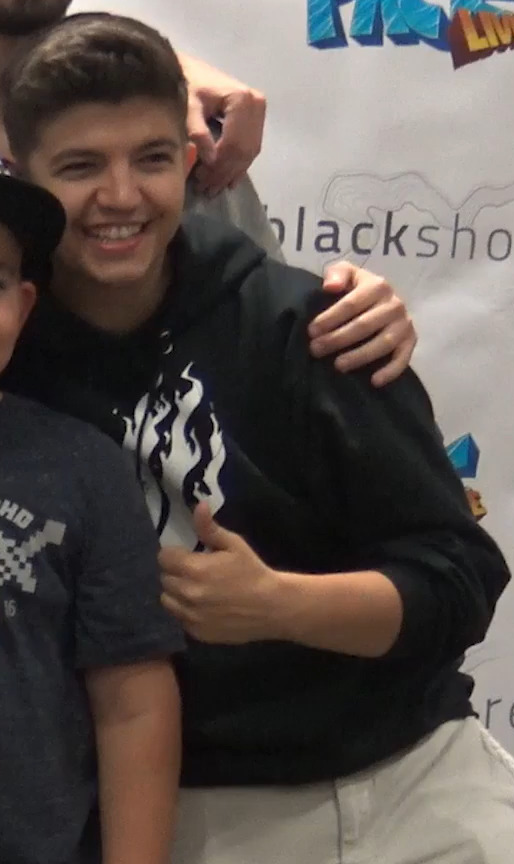
Arsement in 2016

Arsement created his first YouTube channel in November 2010, called TBNRfrags. It first focused on Call of Duty: Modern Warfare 3 gameplay, but later expanded to Call of Duty: Black Ops and, in 2017, Fortnite. He also created a Minecraft channel, PrestonPlayz, in 2012.

Arsement went on his first tour in 2017, hosting meet-and-greets at six Main Event Entertainment centers near Dallas. He also started working with talent management company Night in that year. He joined Envy Gaming as an investor and content creator in 2018 and was paired with Lil Yachty for a celebrity-content creator Fortnite tournament. Also in 2018, he switched his gaming content to a separate channel and made his main channel focused around lifestyle, vlog, and challenge content, substantially growing his channel.

== Personal life ==
Arsement married Brianna Barnhart, also known as BriannaPlayz, in 2018. The two reside in Dallas, Texas. He is a Messianic Christian. He also enjoys playing paintball for fun. In October 2026, Arsement announced that his first child is set to be born in March 2027.

== Awards and nominations ==
Year	Award	Category	Result	Ref.
2018	Streamy Awards	Gaming	Nominated	
2019	Streamy Awards	Gaming	Nominated	
2020	Streamy Awards	Gaming	Nominated	
2021	Streamy Awards	Gaming	Nominated	
2020	Kids' Choice Awards	Favorite Gamer	Nominated	
2024	Kids' Choice Awards	Favorite Gamer	Nominated	
