= OverActive Media =

Canadian esports company

- Formerly: The Ledger Group
- Traded as: TSX-V: OAM; OTCQB: OAMCF; FWB: 0RB
- Founded: 2018
- Key people: Adam Adamou (CEO)
- Revenue: ▲CA$21.2 million (2025)
- Net income: ▼ −CA$10.4 million (2025)
- Total assets: ▼CA$67.2 million (2025)
- Total equity: ▼CA$46.1 million (2025)
- Subsidiaries: Toronto Defiant; Toronto KOI; Movistar KOI
- Website: Official website

OverActive Media (OAM), previously known as the Ledger Group, is a esports and entertainment company that fields teams across multiple esports titles through its subsidiaries, including the Overwatch League and Call of Duty League. They also own esports organization Movistar KOI that compete in League of Legends as part of the League of Legends EMEA Championship.

== History ==
OverActive Media's was originally branded as the Ledger Group, a Toronto-based group focused on blockchain-enabled companies. In April 2018, the company announced that it would look to expand in esports franchises. The Ledger Group went on to make investments in Askott Entertainment and Enthusiast Gaming, and after a $1.5 million investment in Splyce, they shifted from an investment platform to an ownership platform and rebranded to OverActive Media. In 2018, OAM and Splyce agreed to purchase a team, later branded as the Toronto Defiant, in the Overwatch League for the league's upcoming 2019 season. On November 21, 2018, OAM announced that it entered an agreement in principle to acquire Splyce. In 2019, OAM purchased a franchise spot in Activision-Blizzard's Call of Duty League, establishing Toronto Ultra.

In July 2020, ESPN reported that OverActive Media would be building a 7,000- to 10,000-seat esports arena at Exhibition Place in Toronto to serve as the home arena to the Toronto Defiant and Toronto Ultra. The report was confirmed in February 2021, as OverActive Media announced the venue. The $500 million project is expected to be the home arena for their esports teams, as well as host mid-sized music concerts and other events. OAM was given full approval by the Toronto City Council as of December 16, 2021. The arena was expected to break ground in 2022 and was expected to be completed in 2025, but complications regarding the Overwatch League's decline means that the status of the arena is unknown.

On November 8, 2023, OverActive Media announced that they had pulled the Toronto Defiant out of the Overwatch League, receiving CA$8.2 million (US$6 million) as part of an updated agreement from Activision-Blizzard. Shortly after OAM's announcement, an OWL spokesperson confirmed that Activision-Blizzard would be transitioning Overwatch esports away from the OWL's franchise system and into a new ecosystem as the result of two-thirds of the organizations (including OAM) voting to leave, also part of the agreement.

On January 4, 2024, OverActive Media executed a letter of intent to acquire Spanish esports organizations Movistar Riders and KOI. The assets to be acquired include all of KOI's esports assets and brands, including social media and intellectual property, and intends to unite the organizations under a single brand by the end of 2024. The deal also involves Movistar Riders' Founder Fernando Piquer and CEO Carlos Garcia-Acevedo taking on key roles within OverActive Media, and entering into service agreements with KOI co-founders Ibai Llanos and Gerard Piqué. Upon the completion of the proposed acquisition, OverActive Media would have control over the following assets: Toronto Ultra, Toronto Defiant, MAD Lions KOI, and Movistar KOI. Once completed, the acquisitions are expected to add CA$10 to $12 million in revenues in 2024.
