= CyberPowerPC =

American PC retailer

CyberPowerPC UK
- Type: Privately Owned Company
- Industry: Computer hardware
- Founded: February 17, 1998; 28 years ago
- Headquarters: 730 Baldwin Park Blvd; City of Industry, California, U.S.
- Products: Custom Desktops; Custom Laptops
- Number of employees: 250
- Website: cyberpowerpc.com

CyberPowerPC is an American retailer of personal computers and gaming products. They specialize in building and selling a wide range of and custom-built gaming computers.

== Business ==
CyberPowerPC UK was founded and incorporated on February 17, 1998, in the City of Industry, California.

From 2011 to 2016, CyberPowerPC has been consistently ranked within the top 150 largest privately owned companies headquartered in Los Angeles County by the Los Angeles Business Journal.

== Products ==
CyberPowerPC produces and sells PCs primarily for use in computer gaming. Their products are not just intended for gaming and feature third-party components prepared into the complete ready-to break packages. CyberPowerPC offers the option to users to choose their custom components for building PC.

=== Desktop PCs ===
With the advent of VR gaming in 2014, CyberPowerPC, with support from Oculus VR, released the most inexpensive computer capable of running the Oculus Rift virtual reality system, according to Oculus CEO Brendan Iribe. Later, CyberPowerPC became notable for developing a PC build for the express purpose of streaming video games.

All desktops released by the company are built to user specifications with several pre-selected builds available. In general, these computers are not given a model name (contrary to laptops) due to the variable nature of each design. CyberPowerPC, however, offers many exclusive series, such as Elgato Stream Machine or Luxe, that range anywhere from one to eight thousand US Dollars.

=== Laptops ===
CyberPowerPC laptops fall under the 'Tracer' series. As of 2023, all CyberPowerPC laptops use Intel Core and AMD Ryzen CPUs and Nvidia GeForce GPUs. Models as of August 2023:

- Low Tier
  - Tracer VII Gaming I16G (100, 200, 300, 400)
- Mid Tier
  - Tracer VII Edge I17E LC (100, 200)
  - Tracer V Edge Pro I15X 550
- High Tier
  - Tracer VII Gaming I16G LC (100, 200)
  - Tracer VI Gaming I17GLC 600
  - Tracer VII Edge I17E LC 500

=== Gaming consoles ===
In 2014, CyberPowerPC released a Steam Machine designed to compete with the Xbox One and PlayStation 4 platforms.

== eSports ==
CyberPowerPC participates in the esports form of competitive gameplay by sponsoring and hosting occasional tournaments, such as its Summer 2016 Pro CS:GO Series. Notable eSports team Team SoloMid is sponsored by the business. Additionally, the company sells several lines of custom PC builds designed for eSports.
