= Atlanta Esports Ventures =

American venture capital firm

- Company type: Privately Held Company
- Industry: Private equity
- Founded: 2018
- Headquarters: Atlanta, Georgia, U.S.
- Key people: Paul Hamilton, President and CEO
- Products: Venture capital
- Owners: Cox Enterprises; Province, Inc.
- Subsidiaries: FaZe Vegas
- Website: Official website

Atlanta Esports Ventures (AEV) is an American venture capital firm. AEV is a partnership between Cox Enterprises and Province, Inc. The firm has an investment in one Las Vegas-based esports team in the FaZe Vegas for the Call of Duty League.

== History ==
Atlanta Esports Ventures was founded in 2018 as a partnership between Cox Enterprises, a global conglomerate headquartered in Atlanta, Georgia, and Province Inc., a financial advisory firm based in Las Vegas, Nevada. Paul Hamilton was selected as the company's president and CEO due to his values and history working with Cox.

== Investments ==
=== Atlanta Reign ===
On August 2, 2018, it was announced that Atlanta Esports Ventures purchased one of Activision Blizzard's expansion slots in the Overwatch League at an estimated $30 million to $60 million. Activision Blizzard had been expecting to sell Atlanta one of the expansion slots, as president and CEO of Activision Blizzard Esports Leagues Pete Vlastlica noted, "We always had our eye on [Atlanta], from the beginning. It [was] just a matter of when." The team, Atlanta Reign, became the first esports team to officially represent the city of Atlanta.

In October 2019, AEV purchased a property for the Atlanta Reign in Atlanta to act as its headquarters for a reported US$2.27 million.

On November 10, 2023, the Reign announced that the team would be disbanded.

=== Atlanta FaZe / FaZe Vegas ===
On May 2, 2019, Activision Blizzard announced that AEV had purchased one of the first five franchise slots for the Call of Duty League. According to ESPN, the publisher was looking to sell slots for approximately $25 million per team. "We have the opportunity to—once again—play a pivotal role in Atlanta's diverse esports community by bringing the future of Call of Duty esports to the city," said Hamilton in a release at the time. AEV and FaZe Clan partnered together for the team, and in October 2019, they announced that the team would be named the Atlanta FaZe. In September 2025, the team relocated to Las Vegas and rebranded as FaZe Vegas.
