= FaZe Vegas =

American esports team

- Game: Call of Duty
- Founded: October 26, 2019; 6 years ago
- League: Call of Duty League
- Team history: Atlanta FaZe (2020–2025); FaZe Vegas (2025–present)
- Based in: Las Vegas, Nevada, U.S.
- Colors
- CEO: Paul Hamilton
- Championships: 2 (2021 & 2026)
- Stage titles: 8 (2021 Major 1, 3 & 4) (2023 Major 2) (2024 Major 2) (2025 Major 1 & 2) (2026 Major 2)
- Partners: Mtn Dew Amp Game Fuel; Respawn
- Parent group: Atlanta Esports Ventures; FaZe Clan
- Website: Official website

FaZe Vegas (formerly Atlanta FaZe) is an American professional Call of Duty League (CDL) esports team based in Las Vegas, Nevada. It is owned by Atlanta Esports Ventures and FaZe Clan. FaZe won the 2021 and 2026 world championships and currently hold the record for most stage titles with eight. FaZe was announced as one of the first five cities to host a CDL team as the Atlanta FaZe.

== History ==
On May 2, 2019, Activision Blizzard announced that Atlanta Esports Ventures had purchased one of the first five franchise slots for the Call of Duty League. According to ESPN, the publisher was looking to sell slots for approximately $25 million per team. "We have the opportunity to — once again — play a pivotal role in Atlanta's diverse esports community by bringing the future of Call of Duty esports to the city," said Hamilton in a release at the time.

The team, which is a partnership between Atlanta Esports Ventures and FaZe Clan, was announced in October 2019 as one of the first twelve franchises to compete in the inaugural COD League. Atlanta FaZe was the second Atlanta based team investment after Atlanta Reign from the Overwatch League, and is the third region-based team for FaZe. Atlanta announced its inaugural season roster the same month. As the league was modeled on the region-based format of traditional sports teams and the Overwatch League, all players were based in the Atlanta area. The team's coach is James "Crowder" Crowder, known for winning the Call of Duty Championship 2015 as a member of Denial Esports.

The team won the Atlanta Home Series in February 2020, followed by a win in the Florida Home Series in May, making them the second team after Dallas Empire to win two tournaments. In May 2020, Atlanta FaZe became the team with the highest standing in the COD League.

In September 2025, the team relocated to Las Vegas and rebranded as FaZe Vegas.

== Current roster ==
FaZe Vegas roster
Players
Coaches

Handle	Name	Nationality
Alluka	Bindal, Mohammed	Germany
HyDra	Paco, Rusiewiez	France
Scrap	Thomas, Ernst	United States
Simp	Lehr, Chris	United States

Head coach

James "Crowder" Crowder

Assistant coach(es)

Richard "RJ" Simoncelli

Legend:
- (I) Inactive
- (S) Suspended
- Substitute
- (injured) Injury / Illness

Roster updated October 19, 2026.

== Awards and records ==
=== Seasons overview ===
Season	Regular season							Finish	Playoffs	Note
Season	P	MW	ML	MW%	GW	GL	GW%	Finish	Playoffs	Note
2020	33	26	7	.788	86	46	.652	1st	2nd, Lost in Grand Finals, 1–5 (Empire)	As Atlanta FaZe
2021	41	34	7	.829	123	53	.699	1st	1st, Won Grand Finals, 5–3 (Ultra)	As Atlanta FaZe
2022	41	28	13	.683	102	70	.593	1st	2nd, Lost in Grand Finals, 2–5 (Thieves)	As Atlanta FaZe
2023	47	31	16	.660	112	81	.580	1st	3rd, Lost in Losers Finals, 1–3 (Subliners)	As Atlanta FaZe
2024	45	37	8	.822	126	52	.708	1st	5th/6th, Lost in Losers round 2, 0–3 (Ultra)	As Atlanta FaZe
2025	45	34	11	.756	119	64	.650	2nd	5th/6th, Lost in Losers round 2, 0–3 (Heretics)	As Atlanta FaZe
2026	54	33	21	.611	120	93	.563	3rd	1st, Won Grand Finals, 5–2 (OpTic)	As FaZe Vegas

=== Tournament wins ===
==== CDL Major events ====
===== Atlanta FaZe =====
Date	Prize	Event	Roster
2020-02-23	$60,000	Call of Duty League 2020 Week 3 - Atlanta	aBeZy • Simp • Cellium • MajorManiak • Priestahh • Crowder (coach) • RJ (coach)
2020-05-10	$50,000	Call of Duty League 2020 Week 7 - Florida	aBeZy • Simp • Cellium • MajorManiak • Priestahh • Crowder (coach) • RJ (coach)
2021-03-07	$200,000	Call of Duty League 2021 - Stage 1 Major	aBeZy • Simp • Cellium • Arcitys • Crowder (coach) • RJ (coach)
2021-05-16	$200,000	Call of Duty League 2021 - Stage 3 Major	aBeZy • Simp • Cellium • Arcitys • Crowder (coach) • RJ (coach)
2021-06-20	$200,000	Call of Duty League 2021 - Stage 4 Major	aBeZy • Simp • Cellium • Arcitys • Crowder (coach) • RJ (coach)
2021-08-22	$1,200,000	Call of Duty League Championship 2021	aBeZy • Simp • Cellium • Arcitys • Crowder (coach) • RJ (coach)
2023-02-05	$200,000	Call of Duty League 2023 - Major 2	aBeZy • Simp • Cellium • SlasheR • Crowder (coach) • RJ (coach)
2024-03-24	$150,000	Call of Duty League 2024 - Major 2	aBeZy • Simp • Cellium • Drazah • Crowder (coach) • RJ (coach)
2025-02-02	$150,000	Call of Duty League 2025 - Major 1	aBeZy • Simp • Cellium • Drazah • Crowder (coach) • RJ (coach)
2025-03-23	$150,000	Call of Duty League 2025 - Major 2	aBeZy • Simp • Cellium • Drazah • Crowder (coach) • RJ (coach)

===== FaZe Vegas =====
Date	Prize	Event	Roster
2026-03-29	$150,000	Call of Duty League 2026 - Major 2	Simp • Drazah • Abuzah • 04 • Crowder (coach) • RJ (coach)
2026-07-19	$800,000	Call of Duty League Championship 2026	Simp • Drazah • Abuzah • 04 • Crowder (coach) • RJ (coach)

==== CDL Minor events ====
Date	Prize	Event	Roster
2025-01-12	$20,000	Call of Duty League 2025 - Minor 1	aBeZy • Simp • Cellium • Drazah • Crowder (coach) • RJ (coach)

==== Other Events ====
Date	Prize	Event	Roster
2024-08-18	$600,000	Esports World Cup - Call of Duty MWIII - Multiplayer	aBeZy • Simp • Cellium • Drazah • Crowder (coach) • RJ (coach)

=== Individual accomplishments ===
Season MVP

- Simp (Chris Lehr) – 2021, 2024
- Cellium (McArthur Jovel) – 2022

Champs MVP

- aBeZy (Tyler Pharris) – 2021
- Simp (Chris Lehr) – 2026

1st Team All-Star

- aBeZy (Tyler Pharris) – 2023
- Cellium (McArthur Jovel) – 2022, 2023, 2024, 2025
- Simp (Chris Lehr) – 2024, 2025

2nd Team All-Star

- Abuzah (Jordan François) – 2026
- aBeZy (Tyler Pharris) – 2025
- Drazah (Zack Jordan) – 2024, 2025
- Simp (Chris Lehr) – 2022, 2026
