= Envy Gaming =

Defunct esports organization

- Type: Private
- Industry: Esports
- Founded: November 19, 2007 (original version); January 17, 2025 (current version)
- Founder: Tosh "Stainville" Mcgruder; Skyler "Foreplayy" Johnson
- Defunct: June 27, 2022 (original version)
- Headquarters: Dallas, Texas, U.S.
- Key people: Adam Rymer (CEO); Geoff Moore (President and COO)
- Revenue: US$8 million (2019)
- Subsidiaries: ENVY; Dallas Fuel; Dallas Empire
- Website: envy.gg

Envy Gaming, Inc is a collective esports and gaming company. It was originally founded in 2007 by Tosh "Stainville" Mcgruder and Skyler "Foreplayy" Johnson as a Call of Duty esports team known as Team EnVyUs. Envy Gaming, LLC was formed in October 2012 and incorporated as Envy Gaming, Inc in May 2016. The company owned and operated several esports teams, including Team Envy, the Dallas Fuel of the Overwatch League, and OpTic Texas of the Call of Duty League with OpTic Gaming. In June 2022, it was announced Envy Gaming would retire the Envy brand, and fully become OpTic Gaming. In January 2025, Mike "Hastr0" Rufail reacquired the brand, reviving the company.

== History ==
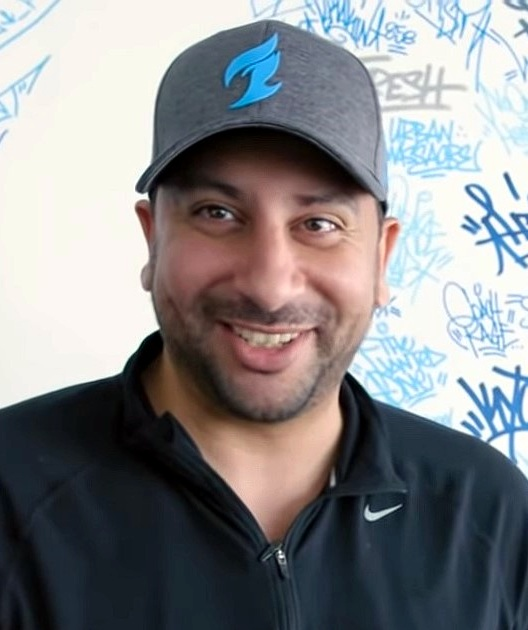
Owner and CEO Mike "Hastr0" Rufail

=== 2007–2016 ===
Envy Gaming was originally founded by Tosh "Stainville" Mcgruder and Skyler "Foreplayy" Johnson as a professional Call of Duty 4 team in 2007, known as Team EnVyUs. The team brought on Mike "Hastr0" Rufail in 2009 as a team member; Rufail would eventually become the team's owner. Envy Gaming, LLC was officially established in North Carolina on October 31, 2012. The company was officially incorporated on May 25, 2016, as Envy Gaming, Inc.

=== 2017–2022 ===
After a reportedly US$35 million investment from Hersh Interactive Group in September 2017, Envy Gaming relocated their headquarters from Charlotte, North Carolina to Dallas, Texas. The deal also allowed Envy to purchase the Dallas-based Overwatch League franchise spot for an estimated US$20 million, making them one of twelve teams competing in the league's inaugural season. Envy Gaming filled the roster by transferring all of the members and staff from the Overwatch team of Team EnVyUs, which officially ended EnVyUs' Overwatch division. On October 5, 2017, the Dallas-based franchise name was revealed as the Dallas Fuel.

On June 28, 2018, Envy Gaming hired former COO for the Circuit of the Americas (COTA) and EVP of sales and marketing for the Dallas Stars Geoff Moore as its first President and COO.

Envy established their second franchised team in May 2019 with the purchase of a slot for Activision's Call of Duty League for a reported US$25 million. The team's name, Dallas Empire, and branding were revealed on October 19 and chosen as a callback to the organization's roots.

In October 2019, Envy Gaming established their headquarters and training facility at Victory Park in Dallas. The 20,872 square feet (1,939.1 m^{2}) will include space dedicated to team training, content creation, player development, and wellness training.

On July 9, 2020, Envy Gaming appointed that Adam Rymer as the company's new CEO, replacing founder and owner Mike Rufail.

In November 2021, it was announced that Envy Gaming would acquire the OpTic Gaming brand as part of a merger. OpTic Gaming leader Hector "HECZ" Rodriguez joined the combined companies' ownership group and was to serve as President of OpTic Gaming. This also brought the OpTic Texas roster for Activision Blizzard's Call of Duty League into the Envy family.

In January 2022, Envy Gaming acquired the operating contract for Esports Stadium Arlington, an esports facility located in Arlington, Texas, from Esports Venues LLC.

In June 2022, it was announced Envy Gaming would retire the Envy brand, and fully become OpTic Gaming. The Envy Foundation, a grant program helping North Texas middle schools and high schools, became the OpTic Foundation. Team Envy's content creators and Rocket League team were rebranded to OpTic Gaming, while the Dallas Fuel team remained as is.

=== 2025–Present ===
On January 17, 2025, Mike "Hastr0" Rufail re-acquired the brand.

== Investors ==
Envy Gaming acquired several investors in 2017. In March, it was revealed that prior to becoming chief business officer of Team Envy, John Brock had invested a seven-figure sum into the team. Months later, in September, Team Envy owner Mike Rufail confirmed that the organization had secured a reportedly US$35 million investment from Hersh Interactive Group. The deal entailed Hersh serving as strategic partners to the organization, whilst Rufail would remain as the principal owner and operator of the team. Two months later, World Series of Poker High Roller winner Fedor Holz invested in Envy Gaming to become a minority owner.

In July 2018, Preston Arsement, known as the YouTube personality PrestonPlayz, joined Envy Gaming as an investor and content creator. In January 2019, Envy announced it had raised US$20 million in external capital; they did not reveal the identity of the investors and only described them as "a mix of prominent local investors and Texas families, as well as a select set of national investors."

In August 2020, Post Malone acquired a minority stake, joining as a co-owner.
