= OpTic Gaming =

American professional esports organization

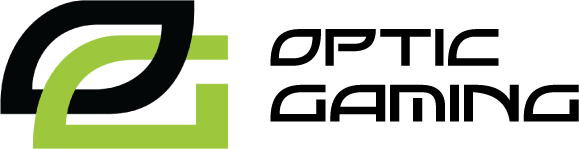
- Short name: OpTic
- Games: Call of Duty; League of Legends
- Founded: 2006; 20 years ago
- Location: 5757 Main St #201, Frisco, Texas, U.S.
- Colors: Green, black, white
- Owner: Hector "HECZ" Rodriguez
- Official fan club: Green Wall
- Partners: Monster Energy; Razer; Wingstop; USAA; PrizePicks
- Website: opticgaming.com

OpTic Gaming is an American professional esports and entertainment organization headquartered in Frisco, Texas. The organization currently operates a League of Legends team in the League Championship Series (LCS) and two Call of Duty teams: OpTic Texas, which competes in the professional Call of Duty League (CDL), and the Huntsmen, which competes in the amateur Call of Duty Challengers division. They previously competed in Counter-Strike: Global Offensive, Gears of War 4, PlayerUnknown's Battlegrounds, Fortnite Battle Royale, Dota 2, Valorant, Apex Legends, Halo, Overwatch, and Rocket League. The organization is currently owned by Hector "H3CZ" Rodriguez. Established in 2006 by OpTic "KR3W" and OpTic Enigma, it is currently the third most followed esports team by social media following.

== History ==
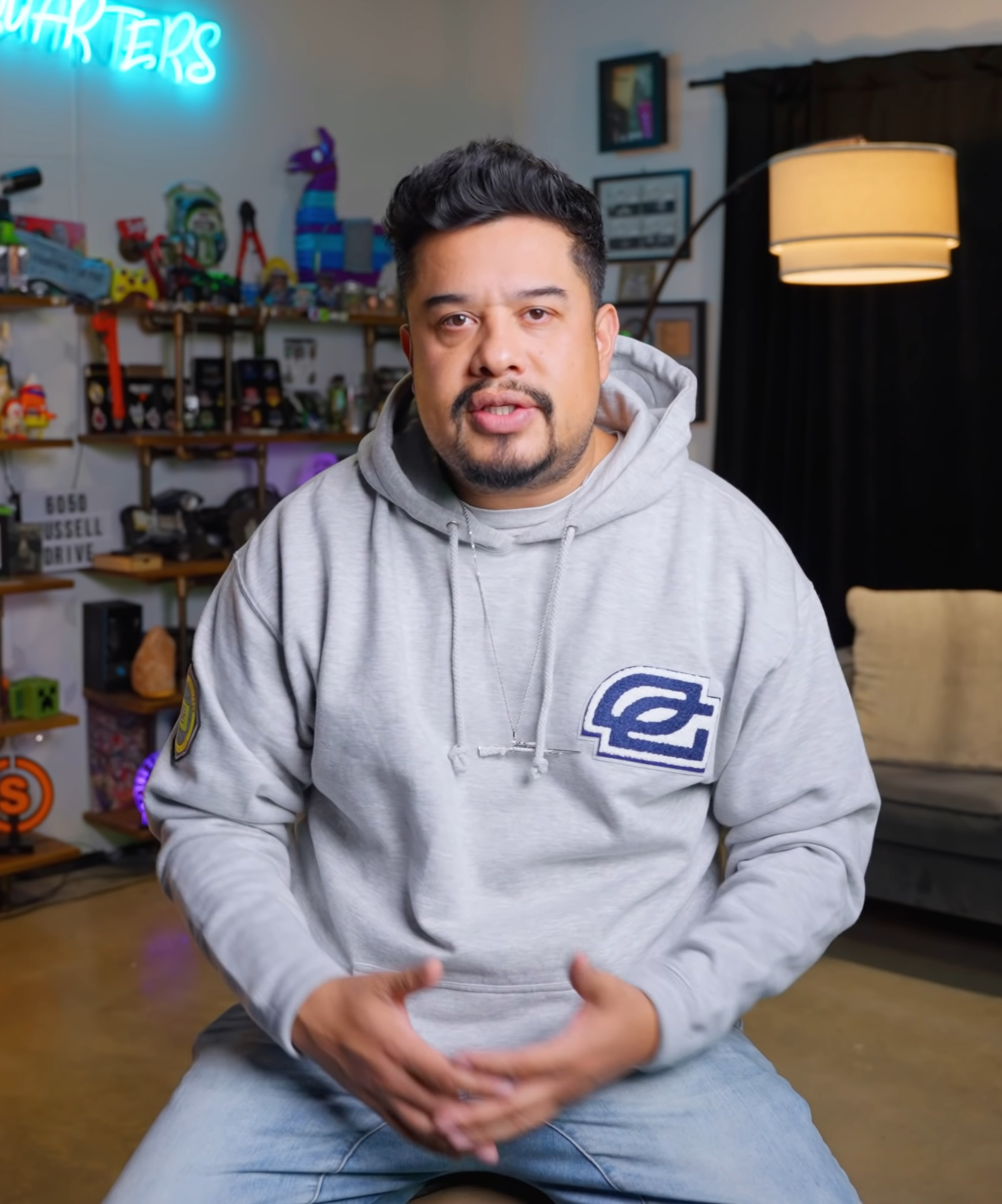
Hector "H3CZ" Rodriguez

OpTic Gaming was established in 2006 by OpTic "KR3W" and OpTic Enigma as a Call of Duty 2 (Xbox 360) competitive team that specialized mainly in Search and Destroy and Team Deathmatch. In 2008, the group of friends would eventually grow older and the team began to dissipate. With OpTic Enigma then long gone, OpTic KR3W stepped down to hand over the team to long-time member Hector "H3CZ" Rodriguez. The team made its new beginnings under OpTic H3CZ on the MLG scene starting in 2010 with Call of Duty: Modern Warfare 2 on the Xbox 360. In 2016, the team, along with e-sports commentator Ryan "Fwiz" Wyatt, released the book OpTic Gaming: The Making of eSports Champions, which details the players' individual Call of Duty esports careers and their contributions to the team's success. The book became a New York Times best-seller, and film and television rights were acquired by producers John Sacchi and Matt Groesch. In 2017, Texas Rangers co-owner Neil Leibman and co-investor Chris Chaney were sold a majority interest in the organization. They created Infinite Esports & Entertainment, a holding company that includes OpTic Gaming and Houston Outlaws as well as other esports verticals operating out of a new Dallas headquarters. OpTic Gaming is currently the third most followed esports team by social media following.

On June 12, 2019, Immortals Gaming Club (IGC) announced the acquisition of Infinite Esports & Entertainment, the parent organization of OpTic Gaming. On September 15, 2019, it was announced by Immortals Gaming Club and Hector “H3CZ” Rodriguez, that Hector would be leaving from OpTic as its CEO for new and independent opportunities. Shortly after it was announced that Hector Rodriguez had joined NRG Esports as co-CEO.

On November 6, 2020, it was announced that 100 Thieves, an organization created by former OpTic Gaming player Matthew "Nadeshot" Haag, had acquired Immortals Gaming Club's LA CDL slot and would rebrand the team in the 2021 season as the "Los Angeles Thieves". Shortly after, on November 11, 2020, it was announced by Immortals Gaming Club and Hector Rodriguez that the latter had fully reacquired the rights to the OpTic Gaming name, thus regaining full ownership of the organization while also relinquishing his minority ownership of Immortals' League of Legends roster in the deal; that same day, it was announced that the Chicago Huntsmen, the Call of Duty League Chicago slot owned by NRG Esports, would be rebranded to OpTic Chicago, thus signifying the return of the "real OpTic" to the Call of Duty esports scene.

In November 2021, it was announced that Envy Gaming would acquire the OpTic Gaming brand as part of a merger. OpTic Gaming leader Hector “HECZ” Rodriguez joined the combined companies’ ownership group and was to serve as President of OpTic Gaming. This also brought the OpTic Texas roster for Activision Blizzard's Call of Duty League into the Envy family.

On April 28, 2022, they announced they signed Knoqd, SkittleCakez, and Dooplex to a competitive Apex Legends roster.

On June 27, 2022, it was announced Envy Gaming would retire the Envy brand, and fully become OpTic Gaming. The Envy Foundation, a grant program helping North Texas middle schools and high schools, is now the OpTic Foundation. Envy's Rocket League team has also become OpTic's Rocket League team. The Dallas Fuel team in the Overwatch League will remain as is, going into its sixth season in the Overwatch League.

== Current divisions ==
=== Call of Duty ===
==== History ====
===== Modern Warfare 2 (2009–10 season) =====
OpTic took 8th in the Online Call of Duty: Modern Warfare 2 National Championships before placing 4th at the MLG National Championships 2010 and picking up $5000 before the start of the next Call of Duty: Black Ops season.

===== Black Ops (2010–11 season) =====
Matt Haag was dropped from the team for the Call of Duty: Black Ops 2011 season which was the first season of Call of Duty on the Major League Gaming since Call of Duty 4: Modern Warfare. He briefly returned to the OpTic Competitive team, replacing a player who felt ill, at MLG Dallas, where OpTic Gaming finished 3rd with virtually no practice as a squad. Subsequently, after mentioning the possibility of replacing the teammate that had fallen sick, he did not get picked up. Haag played on several different teams in the professional scene and created his own OpTic Nation competitive team and started making videos and streaming footage. For the next two events he played for Team EnVyUs finishing 8th at MLG Anaheim and then 3rd at MLG Raleigh before playing on Surreal Legacy for the final two events of the year placing 7th at MLG Orlando and then finishing in 15th at the MLG Providence national championships to finish off the Call of Duty: Black Ops Major League Gaming season.

===== Modern Warfare 3 (2011–12 season) =====
With Call of Duty: Modern Warfare 3 looming, Call of Duty announced Call of Duty XP where Activision hosted a $1 million tournament to showcase the newest edition of the franchise. With two members of the OpTic Gaming team not being available to play, Haag was picked up again. They made it to the Grand Final. They took the series 3–1, and the team won $400,000 and the trophy. Again, Matt 'NaDeSHoT' Haag was not picked up for the main OpTic Gaming team and instead created his own OpTic team under the OpTic Nation brand, which did not go on to win any events. MW3 did not make the MLG 2012 season, reportedly due to the absence of a LAN function in the game. Because of this, only a few tournaments were held (notably 360 iCoNs and EGL) in North America. However, at Blackpool's EGL 8 Haag placed 7/8th playing under Leverage with notable players TeePee, ACHES and John.

===== Black Ops 2 (2012–13 season) =====
On November 12, 2012, Treyarch released Call of Duty: Black Ops II, the second title in the Black Ops series for Call of Duty.. The game was a success competitively and attracted a bigger audience through the season. With Frag Cup 4, an annual online tournament at the start of a new Call of Duty title, coming up, a member of the OpTic Gaming competitive team was unable to play due to gambling restrictions in his province, and after impressing early on in the game, OpTic Gaming picked up NaDeSHoT, who rejoined the OpTic Gaming competitive team permanently. They finished in the 7th/8th position in Frag Cup 4 before going to the first LAN event which was UMG Chicago. OpTic Gaming started the tournament strong, making their way to the finals without losing. The team then lost the first series in the final. However, because they were the winners of the 'winners final', the match went into a final and decisive series, in which they were able to win 3–2 and become the first Call of Duty: Black Ops II champions.

The next tournament was MLG Dallas. Here, the top 8 teams qualified to compete at that year's Call of Duty Championships, which was an annual $1,000,000 event. OpTic Gaming went on to finish in the 5th/6th position.

At the Call of Duty Championships, OpTic Gaming finished in third place, losing to the eventual winners of the tournament. They then played in Gfinity 1 (G1) in London, United Kingdom and MLG Anaheim in Anaheim, California where they were placed in third respectively at both events. The next event OpTic attended was Gfinity (G2) in London. However, their new roster finished 9th–12th. Their performance at the MLG Fullsail Invitational, where the four highest ranked Black Ops II teams competed, (and which was to be OpTic Gaming and MLG's final event of the Call of Duty: Black Ops 2 competitive season) was much improved, finishing in second place.

===== Ghosts (2013–14 season) =====
The next title of the Call of Duty franchise was Call of Duty: Ghosts which MLG announced that it would be their featured FPS title for the upcoming season again. OpTic Gaming was disappointed at both of their first two events which were to be MLG Columbus (13–16th place) and UMG Philadelphia (9–12th place) before a roster change occurred with one player retiring, two leaving and one later rejoining. During this time Haag teamed with Christopher Duarte, who goes by the name of 'Parasite'. At this time, the team consisted of 'NaDeSHoT', 'Clayster', 'Ricky' and 'Parasite'. However, after only a handful of days, 'Parasite' and 'Ricky' left OpTic to join Curse Las Vegas. OpTic then picked up 'Saints' and 'MBoZe', before 'Scumpii' rejoined OpTic to replace the departing 'Saints', who returned to Strictly Business. After the retirement of 'BigTymer' following UMG Philadelphia, NaDeSHoT became the captain of OpTic Gaming.

OpTic qualified for the Call of Duty: Ghosts national qualifiers for the annual Call of Duty Championship $1,000,000 tournaments after qualifying via MLG's online qualifying tournament. At the US Championship Finals, OpTic Gaming finished in 7th place to qualify for the Call of Duty World Championship, after eliminating Curse New York in an elimination game in a best of 5 series. This allowed the team to qualify for the annual $1 million tournament. The OpTic Gaming squad played in the MLG Pro Circuit Season 1 online league where after a promising start they suffered problems online and were not able to qualify for the MLG PAX East Championship; eventually, OpTic Gaming finished bottom of the league in 10th place. OpTic Gaming later announced they were hosting the winners of the US Regional finals, Strictly Business Gaming for a pre-LAN event for the World Championships.

At the Call of Duty World Championships, OpTic were placed in a group with Epsilon eSports, NSP, and SSOF. Controversy was caused when 'SSOF' were disqualified and OpTic only had two teams in their group. OpTic first played 'NSP' and beat them 3-0, leading to a group decider against Epsilon, where OpTic Gaming lost 3–0. However, they advanced as the second seed and faced tK in the first round of the winners bracket. OpTic had a 3–0 victory against a team considered to be a top-three team by many. In the second round, OpTic was to come up against Strictly Business Gaming who they had hosted in a pre-LAN event, however, they won 3–2 and played Australian team Trident T1 Dotters for a guaranteed top-three finish. OpTic Gaming won the series 3–1 and guaranteed themselves 3rd and $120,000. OpTic were then to face CompLexity who were undefeated on Call of Duty: Ghosts and came up short in the winners bracket finals losing 3–2. OpTic then lost to Team EnVyUs in the losers bracket finals, finishing with a top three finish and winning $30,000.

On April 15, 2014, OpTic Gaming announced that Marcus 'MBoZe' Blanks would be leaving the team for Jordan 'ProoFy' Cannon to join the team. The OpTic Gaming roster for UGC Niagara and for the 2014 season Call of Duty: Ghosts season was Seth "Scump" Abner, James 'Clayster' Eubanks and Jordan 'ProoFy' Cannon.

At the new roster's first tournament together, a disappointing first day led to them having to play the world's best team, and eventual winners of UGC Niagara, CompLexity Gaming, who proved too strong for the OpTic team. They narrowly won every map to take a 3–0 series win and knock Haag and his OpTic Gaming team out of the tournament. Before and after UGC Niagara, OpTic competed at the MLG Pro Circuit Season 2 in order to qualify for MLG Anaheim's pro team tournament to contest for a $70,000 prize pool. OpTic qualified, being second place in the league.

OpTic Gaming team were invited to the MLG X Games on the Xbox One after finishing in the top 3 at the Call of Duty World Championships. They went into the event as underdogs after a disappointing tournament at UGC Niagara, however Haag and his team were able to win their group after beating Team EnVyus and FaZe Red 3–1 to set up a semi-final match against Evil Geniuses,(formerly known as CompLexity). Evil Geniuses were favorites to win the event after a dominant year at LAN events, but OpTic were able to beat them 3–1 to face Team Kaliber in the Grand Finals. They managed to beat Team Kaliber in a match that came down to a Game 5, Round 10 in Search & Destroy, and Haag was able to win a gold medal and his first MLG Championship at the X Games in Austin, Texas.

NaDeSHoT was voted by fans as The Game Awards 2014 eSports Player of the Year. He went to Las Vegas with some of his teammates and sponsors to accept this award.

===== Advanced Warfare (2014–15 season) =====
Advanced Warfare was the next installment in the Call of Duty Franchise for the e-sports circuit. The season began in November 2014. On October 28, 2014, OpTic Gaming, participated in an exclusive Call of Duty: Advanced Warfare streaming event at the so-called 'OpTic House' which they competed vs other teams in Chicago, in order to promote the new edition in the franchise for its creators, Sledgehammer Games.

In season opening competition, MLG Columbus on November 28–30, OpTic achieved second place, losing out to FaZe in the Grand Final. They hadn't dropped a map all day until the grand finals. Faze narrowly took the victory, going all the way to a second best of five series.

The second tournament of the year was UMG Orlando on January 1–2. OpTic achieved first place this time around. They went 0–2 in the first day of competition, but their team managed to bounce back and win their other two games in pool play on the second day of competition. On Championship Sunday, OpTic beat a young team called Stunner Gaming 3–1 in the grand finals.

OpTic was one of twelve teams to qualify for Pro League Season 1, the others being Prophecy, FaZe, Justus, Aware, Automatic Reload, EnVyUs, Denial, eLevate, Rise Nation, Team KaLiBeR and OpTic Nation. The Pro League ran from December 8 through February 28. OpTic Gaming went 38–6 in the MLG Season 1 Call of Duty: Advanced Warfare and qualified with the number one seed for the playoffs which they completed at with a $75,000 prize pool. OpTic Gaming went into the event led by NaDeSHoT and hoped to become the first team to win a LAN tournament without dropping a map. After defeating Rise Nation 3–0, they faced off against a team of younger players in Aware Gaming, who they defeated losing only one map. However, this ruined the team's goal of being the first team to win a LAN tournament with a perfect map-win record. Following a narrow 3–2 victory over Team Kaliber in the winners bracket final, OpTic defeated Denial eSports 3–0 to win their second event in a row. This was OpTic's first win of an MLG event since winning previously at X Games during the Call of Duty: Ghosts season.

At the Call of Duty Championships on March 27–29, OpTic officially announced their long-awaited sponsorship with Red Bull, following members Matt "NaDeSHoT" Haag and Michael "FlameSword" Chavez who had been individually sponsored. OpTic placed disappointingly at the event in the 7th-8th position following losses to Denial eSports in the winners bracket and FaZe Clan in the losers bracket, the former of which went on to win the event.

On April 4, 2015, NaDeSHoT announced that he was stepping down as captain and member of the OpTic Gaming pro-team, partially due to disappointment from OpTic's CoD Championships placement. He said that he would become a full-time content creator as well as co-owner of the OpTic organization. He was replaced on the lineup by Damon "Karma" Barlow. However, Karma missed ESWC 2015 and the Gfinity Spring Masters competitions because of a pending United States citizenship application. He was replaced by Ian "Enable" Wyatt.

===== OpTic Gaming Los Angeles (2019–2020) =====
OpTic Gaming Los Angeles logo

In February 2019, Activision confirmed that they would be launching a city-based franchise league for Call of Duty. On July 1, 2019, Activision confirmed that Immortals Gaming Club would operate the Los Angeles spot in the newly formed league, with the spot being presented by OpTic Gaming. Additionally, the current OpTic Gaming roster will have the opportunity to sign Call of Duty League contracts adhering to the new regulations of the league.

In September 2019 Ian “Crimsix” Porter decided to leave OpTic and become a free agent to any team participating in the 2020 Call of Duty League.

On September 23, 2019, OpTic Gaming's Twitter page announced the signing of Eric “Muddawg” Sanders as the first GM of OpTic Gaming Los Angeles for the inaugural season of Call of Duty League in 2020.

On January 8, 2020, they announced the signing of Jonathan “Pacman” Tucker as the new head coach via their Twitter and YouTube channel.

===== OpTic Chicago (2020–2021) =====
On November 11, 2020, it was announced by Immortals Gaming Club and Hector Rodriguez that the latter had fully reacquired the rights to the OpTic Gaming name, thus regaining full ownership of the organization while also relinquishing his minority ownership of Immortals' League of Legends roster in the deal; that same day, it was announced that the Chicago Huntsmen, the Call of Duty League Chicago slot owned by NRG Esports, would be rebranded to OpTic Chicago, thus signifying the return of the "real OpTic" to the Call of Duty esports scene.

OpTic Chicago's roster for the Call of Duty: Cold War season consisted of Seth "Scump" Abner, Matthew "Formal" Piper, Brandon "Dashy" Otell, and Dylan "Envoy" Hannon.

===== OpTic Texas (2021–present) =====
On November 8, 2021, it was announced that OpTic Gaming would be merging with their new parent company Envy Gaming to found OpTic Texas for the Call of Duty: Vanguard season. This would subsequently mark the end of OpTic Gamings partnership with NRG esports. The same date had the team announcing the roster for the upcoming CDL season which consists of the inaugural roster of; Anthony "Shottzy" Cuevas-Castro, Indervir "Illey" Dhaliwal, Seth "Scump" Abner, and Brandon "Dashy" Otell.

The team would win OpTic Gaming's second and third world championships in Call of Duty in the 2024 and 2025 CDL seasons.

===== Huntsmen (2025–present) =====
On December 4, 2025, OpTic Gaming founded the Huntsmen as their amateur roster to compete in the Call of Duty Challengers division, with the team name paying tribute to the Chicago Huntsmen. The inaugural roster consisted of Nicholas "Kips" Lyons, Jeremiah "Nium" Harrison, Jonathan "Renegade" Willette, and Nicholas "Rspi" Barton with Anthony "Methodz" Zinni as the general manager and a temporary coach. On December 18, Michael "MajorManiak" Szymaniak was announced as the team's official head coach. In February 2026, Nium and Kips were acquired by the Los Angeles Thieves and Toronto KOI respectively, and Giancarlos "Johnny" Carrasco and Nemensions were signed to the roster. In April 2026, Nemensions and Rspi both departed the team with Carson "Brack" Newberry and Jared "Swooty" Najera joining the roster. In May 2026, Joseph "Owakening" Conley joined the roster in place of Swooty.

==== Current rosters ====
===== CDL roster =====
OpTic Texas roster
Players
Coaches

Handle	Name	Nationality
Dashy	Otell, Brandon	Canada
Huke	Garland, Cuyler	United States
Mercules	Ramsey, Mason	United States
Shotzzy	Cuevas-Castro, Anthony	United States

Head coach

Damon "Karma" Barlow

Assistant coach(es)

JohnPaul "JP Krez" Krez

Legend:
- (I) Inactive
- (S) Suspended
- Substitute
- (injured) Injury / Illness

Latest roster transaction: July 30, 2025.

===== Challengers roster =====
Huntsmen Call of Duty roster
Players
Coaches

Handle	Name	Nationality
Mince	Motomura, Andrew	Canada
Purj	Perez, Evan	United States
Swooty	Najera, Jared	United States
Tkay	Montalvo, Matthew	Dominican Republic

Head coach

Mark "MarkyB" Bryceland

Legend:
- (I) Inactive
- (S) Suspended
- Substitute
- (injured) Injury / Illness

Roster updated October 15, 2026.

=== Notable achievements ===
- 1st — MLG Columbus 2011 (Call of Duty: Black Ops)
- 1st — Call of Duty XP 2011 (Call of Duty: Modern Warfare 3)
- 1st — MLG Orlando 2011 (Call of Duty: Black Ops)
- 1st — EGL 7 Blackpool (Call of Duty: Modern Warfare 3)
- 1st — UMG Chicago 2012 (Call of Duty: Black Ops II)
- 1st — 1st MLG X Games Invitational 2014 (Call of Duty: Ghosts)
- 1st — UMG Orlando 2015 (Call of Duty: Advanced Warfare)
- 1st — MLG Pro League AW Season 1 Playoffs (Call of Duty: Advanced Warfare)
- 1st — Call of Duty Championship 2015 North America Regional Final (Call of Duty: Advanced Warfare)
- 1st — ESWC 2015 (Call of Duty: Advanced Warfare)
- 1st — Gfinity Spring Masters (Call of Duty: Advanced Warfare)
- 1st — UMG California 2015 (Call of Duty: Advanced Warfare)
- 1st — MLG Pro League AW Season 2 Playoffs (XGames) (Call of Duty: Advanced Warfare)
- 1st — UMG Washington DC 2015 (Call of Duty: Advanced Warfare)
- 1st — MLG World Finals 2015 (Call of Duty: Advanced Warfare)
- 1st — ELeague Season 2 (Counter-Strike: Global Offensive)
- 1st — 2016 Call of Duty World League Stage 1 Playoffs (Call of Duty: Black Ops III)
- 1st — 2016 Call of Duty Crown Melbourne Invitational (Call of Duty: Black Ops III)
- 1st — 2016 Esports World Cup (Call of Duty: Black Ops III)
- 1st — 2016 Call of Duty World League Anaheim Open (Call of Duty: Black Ops III)
- 1st — 2016 Call of Duty World League Orlando Open (Call of Duty: Black Ops III)
- 1st — 2016 Gears of War GPC Columbus Open (Gears of War 4)
- 1st — 2016 Gears of War GPC London Open (Gears of War 4)
- 1st — 2017 Gears of War GPC Atlantic City Open (Gears of War 4)
- 1st — 2017 Gears of War GPC Paris Open (Gears of War 4)
- 1st — 2017 Gears of War GPC Las Vegas Open (Gears of War 4)
- 1st — 2017 Halo UGC St. Louis (Halo 5)
- 1st — 2017 Halo North American Championship (Halo 5: Guardians|Halo 5)
- 1st — 2017 Halo World Championship Finals (Halo 5)
- 1st — 2017 HCS Pro League Fall Global Finals (Halo 5: Guardians|Halo 5)
- 1st — 2017 Call of Duty World League Paris Open (Call of Duty: Infinite Warfare)
- 1st — 2017 Call of Duty World League Dallas Open (Call of Duty: Infinite Warfare)
- 1st — 2017 CWL Global Pro League Stage 2 Playoffs (Call of Duty: Infinite Warfare)
- 1st — Call of Duty Championship 2017 (Call of Duty: Infinite Warfare).
- 1st — 2018 Gears of War GPC Dallas Open (Gears of War 4)
- 1st — 2018 Gears of War GPC Mexico City Open (Gears of War 4)
- 1st — 2018 Gears of War GPC New Orleans Open (Gears of War 4)
- 1st — 2018 Gears of War GPC San Diego Open (Gears of War 4)
- 1st — 2019 Gears of War GPC Mexico City Open (Gears of War 4)
- 1st — 2019 Gears of War GPC Boston Open (Gears of War 4)
- 1st — 2019 Call of Duty World League Las Vegas Open (Call of Duty: Black Ops 4)
- 1st — 2020 Call of Duty League London Home Series #1 (Call of Duty: Modern Warfare 2019) [Chicago Huntsmen]
- 1st — 2020 Call of Duty League Seattle Home Series (Call of Duty: Modern Warfare 2019) [Chicago Huntsmen]
- 1st — 2022 Call of Duty League - Major 1 (Call of Duty: Vanguard) [OpTic Texas]
- 1st — 2022 Halo Championship Series - Orlando Major (Halo: Infinite)
- 1st — 2022 Halo World Championship (Halo: Infinite)
- 1st — 2023 Halo Championship Series - Charlotte Major (Halo: Infinite)
- 1st — 2023 Halo Championship Series - Fort Worth Major (Halo: Infinite)
- 1st — 2024 Call of Duty League season - Major 3 (Call of Duty: Modern Warfare III (2023 video game)) [OpTic Texas]
- 1st — 2024 Call of Duty League season - Call of Duty Championship (Call of Duty: Modern Warfare III (2023 video game)) [OpTic Texas]
- 1st — 2025 Halo Championship Series - Arlington Major (Halo: Infinite)
- 1st — 2025 Halo Championship Series - Dreamhack Major (Halo: Infinite)
- 1st — 2025 Call of Duty League season - Call of Duty Championship (Call of Duty: Black Ops 6) [OpTic Texas].
- 1st — 2025 Esports World Cup - Call of Duty: Black Ops 6 (Call of Duty: Black Ops 6).
- 1st — 2026 Call of Duty League season - Major 4 (Call of Duty: Black Ops 7) [OpTic Texas]
- 1st ― 2026 Esports World Cup - Call of Duty: Black Ops 7 (Call of Duty: Black Ops 7)

=== League of Legends ===
As part of the North American League of Legends Championship Series (NA LCS) adopting a franchising model starting in the 2018 season, OpTic Gaming was announced as one of the league's 10 teams, being one of four (alongside 100 Thieves, Clutch Gaming and Golden Guardians) to enter the competition. Following the 2019 LCS season, of which OpTic only made the playoffs during the Summer split, the roster was transferred to Immortals.

On November 16, 2026, OpTic were announced to return to the LCS, taking over from Dignitas as part of a partnership. Under the arrangement, Dignitas owned the LCS spot, but it would be managed by Riot Games for the partnership's duration.

== Former divisions ==
=== Apex Legends ===
On April 28, 2022, it was announced that OpTic Gaming would be entering the competitive Apex Legends scene.

==== ALGS 2022 Season ====
After a fierce battle between Cloud9 and OpTic Gaming, OpTic ended up placing first in the ALGS Split 2 Winners Bracket, qualifying them for Split 2 Playoffs. OpTic Gaming would than go on to place 4th in the Playoffs, qualifying for LAN Finals. OpTic Gaming ended up placing third overall in the Group Stage, just behind Furia and EXO Clan . OpTic placed first, fourth, and twelfth in each round respectively (scoring 69, 53, and 32 in each round.) Since they placed top 10 of 20, Optic qualified to the winners bracket of the Bracket Stage. After qualifying, OpTic had a hiccup in their performance in the Winner Bracket. Failing to secure even a top 2 placement in any of the 8 rounds, OpTic only scored 32 total points. Placing 16th overall and dropping to Loser Bracket round two, OpTic needed a top 10 placement to continue their championship run. In Losers Bracket 2, OpTic was sitting in third place going in to the seventh round with the posability of falling out of the top 10 with two horrible games. Instead, OpTic secured their place in LAN Championship with a 26-point game (14 kills.) Only placing behind 100 Thieves. After Optic Gamings amazing first year as a team their performance in the 2022 ALGS Grand Finals was rather lacking. Never placing higher than a fourth place (Round 8) OpTic ended their year placing 16th overall.

==== ALGS 2023 Season ====
After making their way through the losers bracket, Optic eventually qualifies to LAN in 8th place overall, barely avoiding elimination by two spots. With similar placements to their 2022 year, OpTic placed fourth overall in the group stage, qualifying them to the Winners Bracket. OpTic Gaming placed fourth overall in the bracket stage as well, with only BLVKHVND, Luminosity Gaming, and Dream Fire placing ahead of them. In the Grand Finals OpTic Gaming got off to an amazing start, winning games 1 and 3, getting to match point my round 4. On round 4 OpTic Gaming had an amazing position in storm stolen away from them by NRG, OpTic is than forced to play a less effective end game with little to no loot. In the end OpTic gets second place in round 4, losing to NRG. After this loss, it appeared to strip OpTic of any ability to finish out a game, and after two more third place placements OpTic Gaming would get eliminated early in round 8, allowing TSM to win the Grand Finals with three straight round victories. OpTic Gaming ended up placing second overall behind TSM and ahead of BLVCKHVND.

=== Counter-Strike: Global Offensive ===
==== First roster (January 2016 – August 2017) ====
OpTic Gaming established its Counter-Strike: Global Offensive (CS:GO) team by acquiring the North American roster of Conquest before participating in the ELEAGUE Road to Vegas. This lineup included Damian "daps" Steele, William "RUSH" Wierzba, Keith "NAF" Markovic, Shazeeb "ShahZaM" Khan, and Peter "stanislaw" Jarguz. The team quickly demonstrated its prowess, earning an opportunity to compete in the international tournament, ELEAGUE Season 1. However, initial setbacks occurred when the team lost to Splyce in the MLG Columbus Minor and Winterfox in the MLG Columbus Last Chance Minor. Subsequently, a roster change was made, with Oscar "mixwell" Cañellas from gBots eSports Club replacing ShahZaM.

Under the OpTic Gaming banner, the team had a successful first ESL Pro League season, reaching the Season 3 Finals but narrowly missing the Playoffs after a close loss to Luminosity Gaming. Despite only securing 15th-16th place in ELEAGUE Season 1, the team showed resilience. They achieved significant success by winning the American Minor, securing a spot in the Cologne Major's offline qualifier.

The team, featuring a mix of American players and the Spanish player mixwell, qualified for the major by defeating teams like FLuffy Gangsters, FlipSid3 Tactics, and HellRaisers. However, their performance in the major was underwhelming, finishing last after a heavy defeat against NiP. Following a series of poor results and internal issues, stanislaw was initially released but soon brought back, replacing daps. Tarik "tarik" Celik joined the team from Counter Logic Gaming, leading to their participation in the Season 4 Finals, where they finished 5th-6th.

OpTic Gaming's subsequent performance improved markedly. At Northern Arena Montreal, they finished second in their group and advanced to the playoffs, defeating the Danish team Heroic and then triumphing over G2 in the finals. However, a setback followed at Dreamhack Winter, where they finished last. ELEAGUE Season 2 offered a chance for redemption, and the team excelled, beating teams like mousesports and FaZe Clan, before ultimately defeating Astralis in a challenging final. This victory was a significant achievement, with OpTic Gaming taking home $400,000.

The team's success continued at ECS Season 2 Finals, although they were eventually defeated by Astralis. Following a group stage exit at the ELEAGUE 2017 Major and stanislaw's departure to Team Liquid, the team underwent several roster changes, including Spencer "Hiko" Martin, Ryan "fREAKAZOiD" Abadir, Jason "jasonR" Ruchelski, and James "hazed" Cobb. Despite these changes and efforts from coaches Luis "peacemaker" Tadeu and hazed, the team's performance plateaued, with their only notable victory being the CyberPowerPC Extreme Gaming Series in Spring 2017. The departure of key players RUSH and tarik to Cloud9., followed by the release of hazed, marked the end of this North American lineup, signaling the need for a new team composition.

==== Second roster (August 2017 – February 2018) ====
With NAF being placed on the transfer list, where he would later join Renegades, H3CZ decided to create a European line-up. Headlining this would be mixwell and former NiP veteran, Adam “friberg” Friberg acting as in-game leader. The roster brought in ex-FaZe AWPer Aleksi "allu" Jalli, ex-North rifler Emil "Magisk" Reif and PENTA Sports young up and comer Kevin "HS" Tarn. At the online event CyberPowerPC Extreme Gaming Series Fall 2017 they managed only a 3rd-4th place. Their online league results were promising but did not lead to LAN success. The European Boston Minor was their first LAN Event but they failed to make it to the ELEAGUE Major: Boston 2018, coming 3rd in the Minor. The team managed to win the North American Qualifier for IEM Oakland but came 5th- 6th in the main event, losing 2–0 to SK Gaming. Due to impressive online results, they showed up to Pro league Finals coming 5th-6th the same result at ECS Season 4 finals. These unsuccessful results lead to the dropping of the roster.

==== Third roster (February 2018 – October 2019) ====
On February 7, 2018, OpTic announced a new Danish/North American roster that saw the return of ShahZaM and stanislaw, joined by former North duo Kristian "k0nfig" Wienecke and René "cajunb" Borg. Rounding out the roster was Nicklas "gade" Gade, on loan from North Academy. ImAPet remained as the team's coach. The team failed to make any LAN appearances and had average online results leading to the roster going full Danish some two months after the roster was formed. ShahZaM, stanislaw and ImAPet were released from their contracts. OpTic acquired Marco "Snappi" Pfeiffer and Jakob "JUGi" Hansen from Heroic and picked up ex-North coach Casper "ruggah" Due. For the first time, OpTic would have a single nationality lineup all consisting of Danes. In the following months the team struggled achieving no notable placings other than a second place at Dreamhack Summer where they lost to EspiranTo and The Imperial in the final. When the Faceit Minor came along, OpTic were favorites to make the FACEIT Major. After a quick 2–0 in groups knocking over 3DMAX and ENCE respectively the team made it to the play-offs. Their first match-up was against Ninjas in Pyjamas who they bowled over in 3 maps including a 16-3 Victory on Inferno. They played ENCE in the next round where again they beat with a quick 2-1 Victory making the final of the minor qualifier and making the New challenger stage at the Major. The minor was not done as the Danish boys faced off against the Swedes again. They could not replicate their previous match as the Ninja's took them down 2–0. A successful run led them to the major but the elusive first LAN win again did not become reality. On October 11, 2019, k0nfig announced the disbanding of the team, marking an apparent end to OpTic CS:GO.

=== Valorant ===
After the merger of Envy Gaming and OpTic Gaming in 2021, OpTic took over Team Envy's Valorant division. The roster consisted of in-game leader Pujan "FNS" Mehta, Austin "crashies" Roberts, Victor "Victor" Wong, Jaccob "yay" Whiteaker, and Jimmy "Marved" Nguyen, as well as head coach Chet "Chet" Singh. The team won the 2022 Stage 1 Masters in Reykjavík, and finished runners-up at that year's Valorant Champions in Istanbul. After the team was denied entry into the newly launched partnership leagues by Riot Games for the 2023 Valorant Champions Tour, all players and the coach were let go by the organization. After this, the core (FNS, Victor, Crashies, Chet) moved to NRG Valorant. Marved went on to take a break, and Yay joined Cloud9, what was supposed to be a superteam.

=== Overwatch ===
On June 27, 2022, Envy Gaming's Dallas Fuel transitioned to being under OpTic Gaming as a result of the merge of both organizations. The team disbanded, piror to the folding of the Overwatch League, on September 30, 2023.

=== Halo ===
After the merger of Envy Gaming and OpTic Gaming in 2021, OpTic took over Team Envy's Halo division.

== Controversies ==
=== Bahawaka ===
During a PlayerUnknown's Battlegrounds tournament in March 2018, OpTic Bahawaka was found guilty of exploiting a glitch in the game that allowed him to see through walls. Because of the ruling, OpTic had to retroactively forfeit the match where the glitch was exploited. The forfeit moved OpTic from 2nd place down to 5th meaning they had to forfeit US$12,000 in winnings.

=== Forsaken ===
Mid-game during eXTREMESLAND ZOWIE Asia 2018, Nikhil "Forsaken" Kumawat of OpTic Gaming's OpTic India Counter-Strike: Global Offensive team was caught using an aimbot to lock-on to enemies. When caught, Kumawat was recorded trying to hide the cheats while the referee investigated and had attempted to disguise his cheats as "word.exe". OpTic India later responded on their Twitter, stating:

"We stand strongly against any form of cheating as it not only tarnishes the local roster, but potentially harms competitive integrity of the region. We have terminated Nikhil 'Forsaken' Kumawat's contract for his actions. At this time we are also releasing the remaining roster to pursue new opportunities with other competitive options."

OpTic India's Global Offensive roster has since been disbanded.

== Books ==
- Rodriguez, Hector; Haag, Matthew; Abner, Seth; Johnson, Will; Glassel, Ashley; Musselman, Ryan; Wyatt, Ryan (May 17, 2016). OpTic Gaming: The Making of eSports Champions. HarperCollins. ISBN 9780062449306.
