= Call of Duty League =

Professional esports league

- Current season, competition or edition: 2026 Call of Duty League season
- Formerly: Call of Duty World League; Call of Duty Pro League
- Game: Call of Duty
- Founded: 2020
- First season: 2020
- Owner: Activision
- No. of teams: 12
- Countries: United States (8); Canada (2); France (1); Saudi Arabia (1)
- Most recent champion: FaZe Vegas (2nd title)
- Most titles: FaZe Vegas; OpTic Texas (2 each)
- Related competitions: Call of Duty Challengers
- Website: callofdutyleague.com

The Call of Duty League (CDL) is a professional esports league for the video game series Call of Duty, produced by its publisher Activision. The Call of Duty League follows the model of the Overwatch League as well as other traditional North American professional sporting leagues by using a set of permanent, city-based teams backed by separate ownership groups. In addition, the league plays in a tournament point system and playoffs format rather than the use of promotion and relegation used commonly in other esports and non-North American leagues, with players on the roster being assured benefits, and a portion of winnings and revenue-sharing based on how that team performs. The league was announced in 2019 with its inaugural season starting in 2020.

== Format ==
The Call of Duty League is owned by Activision Blizzard and is the company's second franchise-based esports league. The league plays out similar to most North American professional sports leagues, in which all teams play scheduled games against other teams to vie for position in the season's playoffs, rather than the approach of team promotion and relegation more commonly used in other esports leagues. The league currently features twelve teams.

Each match involves two teams in a best-of-five through different games based on gameplay modes and maps within the Call of Duty game. The game used depends on the most recent installment of the series, such as Call of Duty: Modern Warfare II (2022) being used for the 2023 season.

In the inaugural season, the three multiplayer modes used by the CDL include: "Search & Destroy", where one team attempts to plant a bomb and defend it at one of two control points while the other team tries to eliminate the bomb team, or if the bomb is activated, to defuse it in time; "Hardpoint", where a rotation control point appears on the map, and teams earn points for maintaining control on that point; and "Domination", where three control points appear on the map, and teams are awarded points by maintaining control of one or more of these points. In the case of "Search & Destroy" and "Domination", multiple rounds are played, switching the role of each team, while "Hardpoint" is played until a point limit is reached. Once a team has won three games in a match, the match is over, and that team given the match victory. Coaches for teams have a limited number of time outs which they can use during a game and can substitute players during this time; this is in contrast to the OWL format where play substitutions may only occur between games.

The 2020 season schedule is evenly divided into two splits for spring and summer, with a mid-season all-star event taking place after the spring split, and culminates in the Championship Weekend. Each team will host a weekend tournament-style event in their home city, and the top teams from the weekend earns points. The top eight teams at the end of season based on points claim a berth in the playoffs. A total US$6 million prize pool is available to teams in the inaugural season. To standardize play at each homestand weekend, Activision constructed a transportable esports stage with input from each of the teams. To support viewership, Activision studios Infinity Ward and Beenox created a server architecture for the Call of Duty games, the CODCaster, that enables a match to be viewed from multiple different angles and identify which angles have the most exciting action to follow, as to allow the commentators and producers of the broadcast events to help show key action in the match. CODCaster also compiles key in-game statistics, and is able to render the team's characters in their team's colors for the viewing audience, though players themselves will not have this benefit.

Each team must have a minimum of seven players with a maximum of ten. Players are guaranteed a minimum US$50,000 salary with health and other benefits, though players may negotiate for higher salaries. At least 50% of the winnings a team earns must be shared with the team members. Players are not required to live in the city/region that the team represents. Teams are not required to providing housing for players during the season, and if they do not choose to offer it, the team must instead offer a means and stipend to help players to find such housing with approval from Activision.

Activision also established a Call of Duty Challengers series for amateur players to compete in matches and potentially be played into teams that vie for a US$1 millionprize pool alongside the main League season. This provides the League teams with a pool of talent that they can draw from for their teams.

Since the 2021 season, the Call of Duty League uses a 4v4 format instead of 5v5 in the previous season. "Domination" was replaced by "Control", where one team attempts to capture two points on the map, while the other team defends them. The round can end with the attackers capturing both zones within the allotted time, the defenders winning by the time expiring or by either team killing the other thirty times.

The schedule is also split into five stages, with each ending with a Major Tournament. In each stage the teams are split into groups, determined by the teams themselves, via a draft system. Every team competes in each homestand event with the finals of each event being a meeting between teams from the opposite group. During each homestand teams will earn CDL points and the top eight teams at the end of the season will enter the playoffs to compete for the CDL Championship.

On October 14, 2026, Daniel Tsay announced that he would be stepping down as commisioner of the Call of Duty League.

== Call of Duty Challengers ==
Challengers is the amateur division of competitive Call of Duty. Challengers contains all of the up-and-coming players that are striving to enter the official Call of Duty League. The 2020 Challengers season offered a massive prize pool of $1,000,000 to be given out through a series of tournaments. The Challengers division is run through a format of "Pro points" or "Challenger points" which are virtual points given out to people based on their placing in tournaments. Owing to the vast number of people trying to make it to the Call of Duty League, it would be very difficult to find the best players without the addition of these points. This allows for franchised teams such as Optic Gaming or Seattle Surge to have academy teams equipped with the best players in Challengers. This allow for greater branding and the players based on the placing of their academy teams.

The events for Challengers are held offline in special locations. The dates of these events is in accordance to the actual Call of Duty League events. The first event of Modern Warfare was the Minnesota Launch Weekend event where there were professional pro league matches being played as well as Challengers events being held. However, before the first local area network (LAN) event during that weekend. Challengers players have to play in two online ladder tournaments to compete for Challengers points. This points are individual to each person and the sum of those points in accordance to everyone else on the team decides the seeding for the LAN events at home series events. However, in the middle of the 2020 season and beginning in the 2021 season, Challengers will be played in an online format due to the COVID-19 virus. This has changed the format to where players will play in a "Cup" or tournament every weekend in order to compete for prizes and pro points. On top of the cups, the home series events will also be played online as compared to when they were played on LAN in the beginning of the MW season.

== League advertising and viewership ==
Activision Blizzard, the publishers of the Call of Duty series launched the Call of Duty League and focused on a plan to try to make the league as presentable as possible. They first started the league by announcing a partnership with Google to allow YouTube Gaming to have exclusive streaming rights for all of their leagues. This was a major announcement as this was the major way that spectators would be able to watch the league from home. This was especially advantageous when the CDL went to online only due to the COVID-19 virus. The growth of the league coincides with the growth of Activision Blizzard. In comparison to the Overwatch League, the CDL has made a lot more revenue and has reached a larger audience due to several aspects. The Overwatch League which is Activision Blizzard's other franchised league, did not report any substantial or revenue growth for the game itself as well as for the league. As compared to the CDL, which is based on the legendary gaming franchise Call of Duty. Even for the 2020 CDL Modern Warfare season, the game ended up being the top-selling game of the year with 172 million downloads and $87 million in global consumer spending in the first two months of release.

=== Viewership records ===
- The overall growth of the league since the first season has been significant. The opening weekend of the 2021 CDL season was up 50% over the 2020 season at 131,000 viewers at its peak.
- The average viewership of the league in the 2021 season was 118,500 as calculated from the highly anticipated match of Optic Chicago vs Atlanta Faze.
- The whole weekend of matches was kept at a high 80,000 viewers which shows how it was the most watches CDL event since the 2020 CDL Championship.
- The overall average viewership and total hours watched increased by 50% in the 2021 CDL season .
- 1.3 million unique viewers tuned in to watch the opening weekend of the 2021 CDL season which was an increase of over 70% over the 2020 Opening Weekend.

== History ==
In February 2019, Activision Blizzard officially confirmed their intention to launch a city-based, franchised league for Call of Duty, marking their second such organization following the Overwatch League, founded in 2017. To prepare for establishing the League, Activision terminated both the Call of Duty Pro League and Call of Duty World League in mid-2019.

The first five teams to purchase a spot for the league was announced in May 2019; the companies – OverActive Media, Atlanta Esports Ventures, Envy Gaming, c0ntact Gaming LLC, and Sterling.VC – were also parent companies for teams in Activision Blizzard's other franchised league, the Overwatch League. All twelve franchises were finalized in October 2019, with a majority of the franchised having never professionally competed in Call of Duty. The Washington Post estimated that the franchise cost was US$25 million.

Initially, the CDL announced that they would be running a regular season format culminating in postseason playoffs. However, after criticism from the Call of Duty esports community, the league elected to switch to a tournament system, which was officially announced in January 2020.

In the days prior to the launch of the inaugural season, Activision announced it had made a multiyear deal with Google for all of its esports content, including the CDL, to be exclusively shown through YouTube. Prior Activision esports, particularly OWL, had used Twitch. Activision also announced other official sponsors of the league on eve of the first season: On March 9, Activision announced partnerships with both Twitter and the United States Army.

=== Effects of the COVID-19 pandemic ===
On March 13, 2020, the Call of Duty League released a statement entailing that all live home series events were cancelled due to concerns over the novel COVID-19 Coronavirus outbreak, to which they said that upcoming events will be done via online play and possibly return to live events if logistically and feasibly possible. On May 19, 2020, the Call of Duty League announced changes to the 2020 Call of Duty League Championship. Instead of 8 teams making it to the Championship weekend all 12 teams would now compete for the Championship in a double-elimination tournament. A US$4.6 million prize pool was announced, with the winning team taking home US$2 million.

On July 5, 2020, the Call of Duty league announced that the postseason would also be played online as a result of the pandemic. Additional measures to further protect the competitive integrity of the league were also announced. All competitors are to be provided with a universal camera which will need to be activated throughout all matches with the camera providing league officials visibility each competitor's console, controller and monitor.

=== Department of Justice lawsuit and settlement ===
On April 3, 2023 the United States Department of Justice filed a lawsuit and Activision Blizzard agreed to settle the suit on the same day, with provisions that would prohibit it from implementing a salary cap or luxury tax, or any other measure that would unfairly depress player salaries in the Overwatch League, the Call of Duty League, or any other esports league.

== Teams ==
The Call of Duty League follows the model of the Overwatch League as well as other traditional North American professional sporting leagues by using a set of permanent, city-based teams backed by separate ownership groups. The CDL launched in January 2020 with twelve teams, each based in a global city. Of the twelve teams, nine were based in the United States, while the remaining three were based in Canada, the United Kingdom, and France.

Over time the league has seen multiple teams rebrand by either relocating, merging with other organizations or being sold to other ownership groups. Currently, eight teams are based in the United States, two are based in Canada, one is based in France and one based in Saudi Arabia.

=== Current teams ===
Team	Location	Joined	Owner	Notes
Carolina Royal Ravens	(United States) Charlotte, North Carolina	2020	ReKTGlobal, Inc.	Founded as London Royal Ravens
Cloud9 New York	(United States) New York City, New York	2020	Cloud9	Founded as New York Subliners
FaZe Vegas	(United States) Las Vegas, Nevada	2020	Atlanta Esports Ventures, FaZe Clan	Founded as Atlanta FaZe
G2 Minnesota	(United States) Minneapolis, Minnesota	2020	G2 Esports	Founded as Minnesota RØKKR
Los Angeles Thieves	(United States) Los Angeles, California	2021	100 Thieves	Replaced OpTic Gaming Los Angeles
M80 Boston	(United States) Boston, Massachusetts	2022	M80	Replaced Chicago Huntsmen/OpTic Chicago, founded as Boston Breach
Miami Heretics	(United States) Miami, Florida	2020	Team Heretics	Founded as Florida Mutineers
OpTic Texas	(United States) Dallas, Texas	2020	OpTic Gaming	Founded as Dallas Empire
Paris Gentle Mates	(France) Paris	2020	Gentle Mates	Founded as Los Angeles Guerillas, then became Los Angeles Guerrillas M8
Riyadh Falcons	(Saudi Arabia) Riyadh	2020	Team Falcons	Founded as Paris Legion, then became Vegas Legion and Vegas Falcons
Toronto KOI	(Canada) Toronto, Ontario	2020	OverActive Media, Movistar KOI	Founded as Toronto Ultra
Vancouver Surge	(Canada) Vancouver, British Columbia	2020	Canucks Sports & Entertainment, Enthusiast Gaming	Founded as Seattle Surge

== League Championships ==
As of the 2025 season, 14 different franchises have competed in the league, with four having won at least one Grand Finals title.

Season	Winning team	Score	Losing team
2020	Dallas Empire	5–1	Atlanta FaZe
2021	Atlanta FaZe	5–3	Toronto Ultra
2022	Los Angeles Thieves	5–2	Atlanta FaZe
2023	New York Subliners	5–0	Toronto Ultra
2024	OpTic Texas	5–1	New York Subliners
2025	OpTic Texas	5–3	Vancouver Surge
2026	FaZe Vegas	5–2	OpTic Texas

== Stage Titles ==
This is a list of each team by stage titles won. Stage titles are won by being the champion of the major at the end of the stage. Stage titles started with the 2021 season.

Team	Stages Won	Season(s)
FaZe Vegas (Note: Won 2021, 2023, 2024 and 2025 as Atlanta FaZe.)	8	2021, 2023, 2024, 2025, 2026
Los Angeles Thieves	5	2022, 2023, 2025, 2026
Toronto KOI (Note: Won 2021, 2023 and 2024 as Toronto Ultra.)	3	2021, 2023, 2024
Cloud9 New York (Note: Won 2023 and 2024 as New York Subliners.)	3	2023, 2024
OpTic Texas	3	2022, 2024, 2026
Paris Gentle Mates (Note: Won 2022 as Los Angeles Guerrillas.)	2	2022, 2026
G2 Minnesota (Note: Won 2021 as Minnesota ROKKR.)	1	2021
Vancouver Surge (Note: Won 2022 as Seattle Surge.)	1	2022
Carolina Royal Ravens	0	
M80 Boston	0	
Miami Heretics	0	
Riyadh Falcons	0	

== Seasons ==
=== 2020 ===
The regular season began January 24 and continued through July 2020, with a two-week post season playoffs to crown the season winners in August. Teams were due to hold in person tournaments in their respective cities with a rotation of eight of the 12 teams in attendance for each event. However, due to the COVID-19 pandemic, only 3 homestand style events were held, with team owners and players voting to have the league move online for the remainder of the season. The Grand Finals were also held online, on August 30, in which the regular season number 2 seed Dallas Empire defeated the regular season number 1 seed Atlanta FaZe 5–1 to become the first Call of Duty League champions.

=== 2021 ===
During the offseason, the Chicago Huntsmen would be renamed to OpTic Chicago and the OpTic Gaming Los Angeles franchise spot would be acquired and sold to 100 Thieves, who formed the Los Angeles Thieves. The 2021 season had a similar structure to the previous season. However, some things changed and updated since the last season. This season had several stages where teams were randomly picked and put into groups to play each other in official matches for CDL points which dictated the seeds for the teams in the CDL Major tournaments when they happened. The CDL points decide if a team starts in the losers or winners bracket at the start of the tournament. To start off the 2021 season group selections, the 2020 CDL champions Dallas Empire made the first pick of the teams they want in their group and the runner up at the 2020 CDL championships Atlanta Faze made the 2nd pick. There was a snake draft between those two teams until all teams were put into a group. In addition, the top two finishing teams in Stage 1 were then the two teams for group selection in Stage 2. The 2021 season consisted of 5 stages until the CDL playoffs which is the biggest tournament with the biggest prize pool.

=== 2022 ===
During the offseason, the Dallas Empire and OpTic Chicago would merge to form the OpTic Texas. The Chicago franchise spot would be sold to the Kraft Sports Group and Oxygen Esports, who formed the Boston Breach. The 2022 season followed a similar format to the previous season, the only change was all 12 teams are in one group and face 5 other random teams in the Major Qualifiers. The season was notable for Atlanta FaZe finishing as runners up in 3 out of the 4 Major tournaments and also finishing as runners up in the Call of Duty Championship Grand Final, being defeated 5-2 by the Los Angeles Thieves who won their first CDL World Championship.

=== 2023 ===
During the offseason, the Paris Legion would relocate to Las Vegas to become the Vegas Legion. The 2023 season followed the same format as the previous season with an extra Major tournament added. The New York Subliners was the team to beat, being the only team to win more than one major tournament by winning the Major 1 and 5 tournaments along with the CDL Championship with a 5-0 blow out win vs the Toronto Ultra in the Call of Duty Championship Grand Final to win their first CDL World Championship.

=== 2024 ===
During the offseason, the Florida Mutineers franchise spot would be sold to Team Heretics, who formed the Miami Heretics. The London Royal Ravens would also relocate to North Carolina to become the Carolina Royal Ravens. The 2024 season followed the same format as the previous season with one less Major tournament. The 2024 CDL World Championship Grand Final ended with OpTic Texas defeating the New York Subliners 5-1.

=== 2025 ===
During the offseason, the Los Angeles Guerrillas franchise spot was acquired by Gentle Mates, who tweaked the name to Los Angeles Guerrillas M8. The New York Subliners spot was acquired by Cloud9, who renamed the name to Cloud9 New York. The Vegas Legion spot was acquired by Team Falcons, who renamed the team to the Vegas Falcons. The 2025 season followed the same format as the previous season but with two online Minor tournaments being added during the first two stages. The season was notable for OpTic Texas becoming the first team to win back to back CDL World Championships, defeating the Vancouver Surge in the Grand Finals 5-3.

=== 2026 ===
In the off season Atlanta FaZe relocated to Las Vegas to become FaZe Vegas, the Vegas Falcons relocated to Riyadh in Saudi Arabia to become the Riyadh Falcons, Toronto Ultra renamed to Toronto KOI and Los Angeles Guerillas M8 relocated to Paris and rebranded as Paris Gentle Mates meaning a European franchise is in the CDL for the first time since the Royal Ravens relocated to Carolina from London. This season is also the first season since the CDL started where aBezy, Cellium and Simp will not play on the same team, with the 2 former moving to Los Angeles Thieves and Riyadh Falcons respectively.

For the first time since the 2022 season a pre season event, the Monster Energy Invitational was held online between the 12 CDL teams and 4 Call of Duty Challengers teams in a double elimination bracket, the tournament was won by World Champions OpTic Texas.

In November 2025 control was removed as a game mode and Overload was added in its place.

The season consisted of 4 Major tournaments along with 2 minor online tournaments. Major 1 Champions were the Paris Gentlemates, Major 2 Champions were FaZe Vegas and the Major 3 Champions were the Los Angeles Thieves. The 2 Minor Online tournaments were both won by the Los Angeles Thieves. the season was notable for OpTic Texas finishing as runners up in Majors 1, 2 and 3 then finally winning the Major 4 tournament.

FaZe Vegas won the CDL Championship Grand Final beating OpTic Texas 5-2 becoming the 2026 CDL World Champions.
