= OpTic Texas =

American esports team

- Founded: September 13, 2019; 7 years ago
- League: Call of Duty League
- Team history: Dallas Empire (2019–2021); OpTic Texas (2021–present)
- Based in: Dallas, Texas, U.S.
- Colors
- Championships: 1 (2020) (Dallas Empire); 2 (2024 & 2025) (OpTic Texas)
- Stage titles: 3 (2022 Major 1) (2024 Major 3) (2026 Major 4)
- Partners: Jack in the Box; Razer; Scuf Gaming; Mountain Dew; Wingstop; CordaRoy's; Mike's Hard Lemonade
- Parent group: OpTic Gaming
- Website: Official website

OpTic Texas (formerly the Dallas Empire) is an American professional Call of Duty League (CDL) esports team based in Dallas, Texas. OpTic Texas is owned by OpTic Gaming. Dallas was announced as one of the first five cities to host a CDL team.

== History ==
=== Dallas Empire (2019–2021) ===
On May 2, 2019, Activision Blizzard announced that Envy Gaming had purchased one of the first five franchise slots for the Call of Duty League. According to ESPN, the publisher was looking to sell slots for approximately $25 million per team. Starting on October 14, 2019, and over the next 5 days Dallas announced their starting 5 man roster culminating with the announcement of their branding, the Dallas Empire. On August 30, 2020, Dallas Empire won the 2020 Call of Duty League Championship. On September 1, 2020, Clayster announced on his Twitter account that he would go into the 2021 as a restricted free agent as a result of the Call of Duty League moving back to a 4v4 format.

The team started the 2021 season well, finishing 2nd at Stage 1 and 3rd at Stage 2. However, during Stage 3 the team announced that Huke would be moved to the substitute position with FeLo joining the starting roster. Following a disappointing 7th/8th finishing during Stage 3 the team announced another change to the team's roster with Vivid being acquired from the Los Angeles Guerrillas, resulting in FeLo once again being moved to the substitute position. The team showed improvement, resulting in a 2nd finish at Stage 4 after a 5–4 loss to the Atlanta FaZe in the Grand Finals. This result was followed up with a 4th finishing during Stage 5, resulting in the team finishing 3rd in the Regular Season standings. At the Championship Weekend the team finished 3rd following losses to the Atlanta FaZe and Toronto Ultra. After the end of the 2021 season the team announced Ian "Crimsix" Porter and Reece "Vivid" Drost would be leaving the team with both players becoming a Restricted Free Agent.

=== OpTic Texas (2021–present) ===
Ahead of the 2022 season, the team was renamed to OpTic Texas following the merger of Envy and OpTic Gaming.

In November 2021, it was announced that Envy Gaming would acquire the OpTic Gaming brand as part of a merger. OpTic Gaming leader Hector "HECZ" Rodriguez joined the combined companies' ownership group and was to serve as President of OpTic Gaming. This also brought the OpTic Texas roster for Activision Blizzard's Call of Duty League into the Envy family. In June 2022, it was announced Envy Gaming would retire the Envy brand, and fully become OpTic Gaming, thus moving the ownership of the OpTic Texas brand officially under the OpTic Gaming banner completely.

==== 2022 season ====
During the 2022 season the team won Stage 1, followed by a top 6 place finishes at Stage 2 & Stage 3 and a top 4 finish at Stage 4, resulting in a second-place finish in the overall standings. At the 2022 Championship the team finished 4th following a 3–0 loss to the Los Angeles Thieves and a 3–1 loss to the Seattle Surge.

==== 2023 season ====
In August 2022, the team announced that it would be parting ways with Brandon "Dashy" Otell and Inderwir "iLLeY" Dhaliwal ahead of the 2023 season. A day later however, the team announced that both players would still be part of the team for the 2023 season.

After a disappointing Top 12 finish at Major I, the team decided to pick up Cuyler "Huke" Garland to replace Dashy.

On January 17, 2023, Seth "Scump" Abner released a video announcing his retirement ahead of Major II. In the video, it was also announced that Dashy would be returning to the team for Major II. Following a fourth-place finish at Major II, the team dropped ILLeY from the starting roster and added amateur player Daniel "Ghosty" Rothe.

==== 2024 season ====
On June 26, 2023, OpTic Texas announced that it would part ways with Huke and Ghosty ahead of the 2024 season. On July 31, OpTic finalized their MW3 season's roster by announcing the additions of Amer "Pred" Zulbeari from the Seattle Surge, and 2022 Champion Kenneth "Kenny" Williams from the Los Angeles Thieves.

On May 19, 2024, OpTic Texas won their first major tournament in over 2 years by defeating the home team Toronto Ultra at third event of the year. On July 21, OpTic Texas claim their first CDL era championship and their first title since the 2017 season at the Call of Duty League Championship Weekend in Allen, Texas's Credit Union of Texas Event Center.

==== 2025 season ====
On December 11, 2024, it was reported that the team was exploring options to replace Pred as he was dealing with personal issues. On December 12, the team picked up Huke, his 3rd stint with the Dallas Empire/OpTic Texas franchise and left Pred's status with the team unknown. On December 16, Pred confirmed that he was no longer on the team. After a disappointing top 8 finish at the first major, Pred returned to the team and Huke was released.

During the Major 2 qualifiers, the team heavily struggled and went on an 0-18 losing streak in map count before Kenny was released ahead of the second major on March 17, 2025 and 2023 Champion Cesar "Skyz" Bueno from the Los Angeles Guerrillas M8 was signed the following day. On March 26, Pred was released for a second time and Huke was brought back for his 4th stint with the franchise. On May 6, Skyz was benched and amateur player Mason "Mercules" Ramsey was signed to the roster. On June 29, OpTic Texas claimed their second CDL Championship and would be the first team to win back to back world championships in Call of Duty esports.

==== 2026 season ====
The team kept the championship winning roster heading into the 2026 season. The team achieved regular season success, placing first in the regular season standings and winning Major 4. However, the team could not finish their strong year as they placed 2nd in the CDL Championship, losing to FaZe Vegas in the grand final.

== Team identity ==
The original name "Dallas Empire" was derived from the lyrics, "O Empire wide and glorious, you stand supremely blest," of the Texas state song Texas, Our Texas. The team's original primary colors were black and gold, with a secondary color of blue, to represent their regal theme. Their logo displayed a crown, with the points being made up of a stylized N and V, as a nod to Envy Gaming's history in competitive Call of Duty. As of 2024, OpTic Texas uses the traditional colors of OpTic Gaming, green and black. The OpTic Texas logo bears a resemblance to the standard OpTic logo, but with a star representing the Lone Star of Texas in place of the OpTic "G".

== Current roster ==
OpTic Texas roster
Players
Coaches

Handle	Name	Nationality
Dashy	Otell, Brandon	Canada
Huke	Garland, Cuyler	United States
Mercules	Ramsey, Mason	United States
Shotzzy	Cuevas-Castro, Anthony	United States

Head coach

Damon "Karma" Barlow

Assistant coach(es)

JohnPaul "JP Krez" Krez

Legend:
- (I) Inactive
- (S) Suspended
- Substitute
- (injured) Injury / Illness

Latest roster transaction: July 30, 2025.

== Awards and records ==
=== Seasons overview ===
Season	Regular season							Finish	Playoffs	Note
Season	P	MW	ML	MW%	GW	GL	GW%	Finish	Playoffs	Note
2020	35	23	12	.657	80	55	.593	2nd	1st, Won Grand Finals, 5–1 (FaZe)	As Dallas Empire
2021	44	26	18	.591	99	84	.541	3rd	3rd, Lost Lower Finals, 2–3 (Ultra)	As Dallas Empire
2022	36	24	12	.667	90	55	.621	2nd	4th, Lost in Losers Round 3, 1–3 (Surge)	As OpTic Texas
2023	45	30	15	.667	101	76	.571	2nd	5-6th, Lost in Losers Round 2, 2–3 (Surge)	As OpTic Texas
2024	45	29	16	.644	109	78	.586	3rd	1st, Won Grand Finals, 5–1 (Subliners)	As OpTic Texas
2025	41	20	21	.488	76	80	.487	7th	1st, Won Grand Finals, 5–3 (Surge)	As OpTic Texas
2026	52	40	12	.769	139	70	.665	1st	2nd, Lost Grand Finals, 2–5 (FaZe)	As OpTic Texas

=== Tournament wins ===
==== Dallas Empire ====
Date	Prize	Event	Roster
2020-03-08	$ 50,000	Call of Duty League 2020 Week 4 - Los Angeles	Clayster • Shotzzy • Huke • iLLeY • C6 • Rambo (coach)
2020-04-26	$ 50,000	Call of Duty League 2020 Week 6 - Chicago	Clayster • Shotzzy • Huke • iLLeY • C6 • Rambo (coach)
2020-07-19	$ 50,000	Call of Duty League 2020 Week 12 - London	Clayster • Shotzzy • Huke • iLLeY • C6 • Rambo (coach)
2020-08-30	$ 1,500,000	Call of Duty League Championship 2020	Clayster • Shotzzy • Huke • iLLeY • C6 • Rambo (coach)

==== OpTic Texas ====
===== CDL events =====
Date	Prize	Event	Roster
2022-03-06	$ 200,000	Call of Duty League 2022 - Major 1	Shotzzy • iLLeY • Scump • Dashy • Rambo (coach) • Sender (coach)
2024-05-19	$ 150,000	Call of Duty League 2024 - Major 3	Shotzzy • Dashy • Pred • Kenny • Karma (coach) • JPKrez (coach)
2024-07-21	$ 800,000	Call of Duty League Championship 2024	Shotzzy • Dashy • Pred • Kenny • Karma (coach) • JPKrez (coach)
2025-06-29	$ 800,000	Call of Duty League Championship 2025	Shotzzy • Dashy • Huke • Mercules • Karma (coach) • JPKrez (coach)
2026-06-28	$ 150,000	Call of Duty League 2026 - Major 4	Shotzzy • Dashy • Huke • Mercules • Karma (coach) • JPKrez (coach)

===== Other events =====
Date	Prize	Event	Roster
2025-07-27	$ 600,000	Esports World Cup - Call of Duty BO6 - Multiplayer	Shotzzy • Dashy • Huke • Mercules • Karma (coach) • JPKrez (coach)
2026-08-09	$ 600,000	Esports World Cup - Call of Duty BO7 - Multiplayer	Shotzzy • Dashy • Huke • Mercules • Karma (coach) • JPKrez (coach)

=== Individual accomplishments ===
Champs MVP

- Mercules (Mason Ramsey) – 2025
- Shotzzy (Anthony Cuevas-Castro) – 2024

1st Team All-Star

- Dashy (Brandon Otell) – 2022, 2026
- Shotzzy (Anthony Cuevas-Castro) – 2022

2nd Team All-Star

- Dashy (Brandon Otell) – 2023, 2024
- Mercules (Mason Ramsey) – 2026
- Shotzzy (Anthony Cuevas-Castro) – 2023, 2024, 2026
