= Toronto KOI =

Canadian esports team

- Founded: May 2, 2019; 7 years ago
- League: Call of Duty League
- Team history: Toronto Ultra (2019–2025); Toronto KOI (2025–present)
- Based in: Toronto, Canada
- Colours: Purple, black and white
- Stage titles: 3 (2021 Major 2) (2023 Major 3) (2024 Major 1)
- Partners: AMD, Bell Canada, TD Bank, Monster Energy, Scuf, Blacklyte
- Parent group: OverActive Media; Movistar KOI
- Website: Official website

The Toronto KOI (formerly known as the Toronto Ultra) are a Canadian professional Call of Duty League (CDL) esports team based in Toronto, Ontario. The organization is owned by OverActive Media; they currently are only active in Call of Duty. Their name was also used for OverActive Media's Overwatch 2 team, who are usually known as the Toronto Defiant.

The Ultra began its life as a professional CDL team. Toronto was announced as one of the first five cities to host a CDL team for its inaugural 2020 season. According to ESPN, the publisher was looking to sell slots for approximately $25 million per team. The Ultra's CDL team has currently won three Majors, those being 2021 Major 2, 2023 Major 3 and 2024 Major 1.

As OverActive Media are a member of the Esports World Cup Foundation Club Partner Program (funded by Saudi Arabia's Public Investment Fund) via Movistar KOI, who they bought in 2024 from Spanish streamer Ibai Llanos, the Ultra name would be used at the 2024 Esports World Cup for their Call of Duty team, as well as a new Teamfight Tactics squad. In addition, the Toronto Defiant, OverActive Media's Overwatch 2 team, would rebrand to the "Toronto Ultra" for that game's tournament.

== Current roster ==
Toronto KOI roster
Players
Coaches

Handle	Name	Nationality
CleanX	Jønsson, Tobias	Denmark
Ethan	Fowler, Ethan	England
Kips	Lyons, Nicholas	United States
RenKoR	Isern, David	Spain

Head coach

Ryan "Flux" Oldfield

Assistant coach(es)

Stephen "Vortex" Allan

Legend:
- (I) Inactive
- (S) Suspended
- Substitute
- (injured) Injury / Illness

Latest roster transaction: October 25, 2026.

== Awards and records ==
=== Seasons overview ===
Season	Regular season							Finish	Playoffs	Note
Season	P	MW	ML	MW%	GW	GL	GW%	Finish	Playoffs	Note
2020	24	11	13	.458	49	55	.471	7th	5–6th, Lost in Lower Round 4, 1–3 (Ravens)	As Toronto Ultra
2021	45	28	17	.622	110	77	.588	2nd	2nd, Lost in Grand Finals, 3–5 (FaZe)	As Toronto Ultra
2022	34	16	18	.471	70	72	.493	7th	5–6th, Lost in Lower Round 2, 1–3 (Surge)	As Toronto Ultra
2023	44	27	17	.614	105	73	.590	4th	2nd, Lost in Grand Finals, 0–5 (Subliners)	As Toronto Ultra
2024	45	35	10	.778	112	56	.667	2nd	3rd, Lost in Losers Finals, 2–3 (Subliners)	As Toronto Ultra
2025	46	30	16	.652	101	77	.567	3rd	5–6th, Lost in Lower Round 2, 0–3 (Surge)	As Toronto Ultra
2026	49	26	23	.531	98	85	.536	5th	7–8th, Lost in Lower Round 1, 2–3 (Heretics)	As Toronto KOI

=== Tournament wins ===
==== Major ====
Date	Prize	Event	Roster
2020-07-26	$ 50,000	Call of Duty League 2020 Week 13 – Toronto	Methodz • Cammy • Bance • CleanX • Classic • MarkyB (coach)
2021-04-11	$ 200,000	Call of Duty League 2021 – Stage 2 Major	Cammy • CleanX • Bance • Insight • MarkyB (coach)
2023-03-12	$ 200,000	Call of Duty League 2023 – Major 3	CleanX • Insight • Scrap • Hicksy • Flux (coach) • Joee (coach)
2024-01-28	$ 150,000	Call of Duty League 2024 – Major 1	CleanX • Insight • Scrap • Envoy • Flux (coach) • Joee (coach)

==== Other CDL Events ====
Date	Prize	Event	Roster
2022-01-23	$ 30,000	Call of Duty League 2022 – Kickoff Classic	Cammy • CleanX • Bance • Insight • MarkyB (coach) • Flux (coach)

=== Individual accomplishments ===
Rookie of the year

- Scrap (Thomas Ernst) – 2023

1st Team All-Star

- Scrap (Thomas Ernst) – 2023, 2024

2nd Team All-Star

- CleanX (Tobias Jønsson) – 2024
- JoeDeceives (Joseph Romero) – 2025
