= Giglio (name) =

Giglio (pronounced [ˈdʒiʎʎo]), Gilio (pronounced [ˈdʒiːljo]) or Gillio (pronounced [ˈdʒilljo]) is an archaic form of the Italian masculine given name Egidio (Giles), now chiefly surviving as a surname and in various place names. Notable people with the name include:

== Given name ==
- Giglio Dante (1914–2006), Italian-American painter
- Giglio Gregorio Giraldi (1479–1552), Italian scholar and poet
- Gilio Bisagno (1903–1987), Italian swimmer

== Surname ==
- Bruno Giglio de Oliveira (born 1985), known as Oliveira, Brazilian footballer
- David DiGilio, American musician
- Dina Gilio-Whitaker, American academic, journalist and writer
- Ermanno Giglio-Tos (1865–1926), Italian entomologist
- Everton Fernando Gilio (born 1986), known as Tom, Brazilian footballer
- Franco Del Giglio (born 1993), Argentine footballer
- Frank Giglio (born 1933), American politician
- Giovanni del Giglio (died 1557), Italian painter
- Jodi Giglio (born 1968), American politician
- Joe Giglio (born 1967), Maltese politician
- John DiGilio (1932–1988), American mobster
- Joseph Giglio (born 1954), American politician
- Louie Giglio (born 1958), American pastor
- Luigi Giglio (c. 1510–1576), Italian physician, astronomer, philosopher and chronologist
- Luis di Giglio (born 1989), Italian cricketer
- María Esther Gilio (1922–2011), Uruguayan journalist, writer, biographer and lawyer
- Maurizio Giglio (1920–1944), Italian soldier, policeman and secret agent for the Allies during World War II
- Michael Gilio, American writer, director and actor
- Michelle G. Giglio, American biocurator
- Millie Giglio (born 2000), English field hockey player
- Paolo Giglio (1927–2016), Maltese Roman Catholic prelate
- Peter Giglio (born 1972), American novelist, editor and screenwriter
- Stefan Giglio (born 1979), Maltese footballer
- Tony Giglio (born 1971), American film director

== See also ==
- Gigli (disambiguation)
- Gigliola
- Giglioli, Gilioli and Gigliotti
- San Gillio, municipality in Turin, Italy
