= G2 =

G2, G02, G.II, G II, or G-2 may refer to:

== Fiction ==
- Transformers: Generation 2: Part of the Transformers franchise, lasting 1992-1995
- Transformers: Generation 2 (comics), by Marvel Comics
- G2, an android in the movie Inspector Gadget 2

== Science and mathematics ==
- G2, a stellar classification
- G_{2} (mathematics), an exceptional Lie group, or its Lie algebra $\mathfrak g_2$
- G2, a soil erosion model
- G2 gas cloud, an astronomical object on a collision course with the super massive black hole at the center of the Milky Way
- G_{2} phase, part of the cell cycle
- ATC code G02 Other gynecologicals, a subgroup of the Anatomical Therapeutic Chemical Classification System
- Ovoglobulin G2, a protein in egg white
- Haplogroup G2, a subclade of Haplogroup G (Y-DNA)
- g−2, the notation for the anomalous magnetic dipole moment in physics
  - Muon g-2 experiment at Fermilab (E989)
- g^{(2)}, degree of second order coherence in quantum optics
- G2, an informal group of fossil bird eggs from the Gobi desert that were later named Gobioolithus major

== Computing ==
- Extreme-G 2, a 1998 Nintendo 64 game
- G2, a model of PowerPC
- Gnutella2, the P2P file sharing Network
- HTC Hero mobile phone, aka G2 Touch
- LG G2, an Android smartphone developed by LG Electronics
- T-Mobile G2, an Android smartphone made by HTC for T-Mobile USA
- Cook Codec or RealAudio G2, an audio compression method

== Commerce and industry ==
- G2 (company), a peer-to-peer review site (formerly G2 Crowd)
- Gatorade G2, a soft drink
- Canon PowerShot G2, a digital camera
- Contax G2, the second Contax G camera
- Panasonic Lumix DMC-G2, a digital camera
- Slacker G2, a portable audio device for the Slacker music service

== Transportation ==
- County Route G2 (California), also known as Lawrence Expressway
- G2 Beijing–Shanghai Expressway, China
- Glasspar G2, a sports car
- Grumman Gulfstream II, a business jet built
- Fiat G.2, a 1932 Italian transport aircraft
- Galactic 02 (G02), a suborbital tourist spaceflight on 10 August 2023 from Virgin Galactic
- G2, the Avirex Gabon IATA airline designator
- G2, a class of driver's license in Ontario, Canada
- Pontiac G2, a hatchback sold in Mexico

== Military ==
- AEG G.II, a German World War I bomber
- Albatros G.II, a 1916 German biplane bomber prototype
- Dirección de Inteligencia, Cuba, also referred to as "G2"
- Directorate of Military Intelligence (Ireland), commonly referred to as "G2"
- Friedrichshafen G.II, a 1916 German medium bomber aircraft
- G-2 (intelligence), the United States Army unit
- G2, a designation in NATO's Continental staff system, related to Military Intelligence
- Gotha G.II, a German bomber during World War I
- HMAS Nestor (G02), a 1940 Royal Australian Navy N-class destroyer
- Pindad G2, a handgun produced by Pindad
- Soko G-2, a 1961 Yugoslavian two-seat aircraft
- USS G-2 (SS-27), an American submarine

== Other uses ==
- G-2 or Group of Two, a proposed economic bloc and special relationship between the United States and China
- G-2 visa, a nonimmigrant visa which allows travel to the United States
- G2 Esports, a European eSports organization
- G2 (film), an upcoming Indian Telugu-language action spy film sequel to Goodachari
- G2 (rapper), the stage name of South Korean rapper Kevin Hwang
- G2, a block of character codes in the Teletext character set
- G2, The Guardian weekday supplement
- G2, the informal name of Gasherbrum II, the 13th highest mountain in the world, on the China-Pakistan border, in the Karakorum range
- G2, a criteria for speedy deletion on Wikipedia, see Wikipedia:Speedy deletion § G2. Test pages

== See also ==
- Group 2 (disambiguation)
- 2G (disambiguation)
- GG (disambiguation)
- GII (disambiguation)
