= 2G (disambiguation) =

2G is the second-generation wireless telephone technology.

2G or 2-G may also refer to:

- Red 2G, a dye
- Yellow 2G, a dye
- Cargoitalia's IATA code
- A character from Eden of the East
- 2G-Regel, a public health rule in use during the COVID-19 pandemic in Germany, Switzerland and Austria

== See also ==
- 2G+2, an album by the Fall
- The 2 G's, a radioshow
- G2 (disambiguation)
- GG (disambiguation)
- iPhone 2G
