= Gee Gee =

Gee Gee may refer to:

- Gee Gee James, African-American actress and singer Regina James (1902 or 1903–1971)
- Gee Gee Bridge, crossing the Wakool River, New South Wales, Australia
- gee-gee, an archaic, colloquial, childish name for a horse

== See also ==
- Ottawa Gee-Gees, the athletics teams of the University of Ottawa, Ottawa, Ontario, Canada
- GG (disambiguation)
- Gigi (disambiguation)
