= GG =

GG may refer to:

== Arts, entertainment, and media ==
=== Gaming ===
- GG (gaming), an abbreviation used in video games meaning "good game"
- GameGuard, a hacking protection program used in some MMORPGs
- Game Gear, a handheld game console released by SEGA
- Game Genie, a video game cheat cartridge
- Guilty Gear, a fighting game series by Arc System Works
- The G.G. Shinobi, a side-scrolling action game by Sega released for the Game Gear in 1991
- Gamergate (harassment campaign)

=== Music ===
- G. G. (album), 1975, by Gary Glitter
- Girls' Generation, Korean girl group
- GG Allin, transgressive American hardcore punk singer-songwriter

=== Television ===
- Gossip Girl, an American teen drama series
- The Underwater Menace, a 1967 Doctor Who serial (production code "GG")
- GG Bond, Chinese animated TV series

=== Other media ===
- Game Grumps, a video gaming web series

== Law and politics ==
- General Government, Nazi-occupied territory of the Second Republic of Poland
- Gish gallop, a rhetorical debating technique named after Duane Gish
- Glenanne gang, secret informal alliance of Ulster loyalists
- Governor-general, a viceregal title commonly used in the Commonwealth
- Grundgesetz, the German constitution

== Places ==
- Guernsey (top-level domain country code .gg)
- Groß-Gerau's vehicle registration code

== Sports ==
- Galle Gladiators, a team participating in Lanka Premier League
- Gujarat Giants (disambiguation), various sports teams in the Indian state of Gujarat

== Transportation ==
- GG (New York City Subway service)
- Sky Lease Cargo's IATA designation
- GG, a version of the Subaru Impreza station wagon
- GG Duetto, a motorcycle+sidecar built by Swiss Grüter+Gut Motorradtechnik GmbH (GG)
- GG cycle, a rocket engine operation method; see gas-generator cycle

== Other uses ==
- Gadu-Gadu, an instant messaging program popular in Poland
- Gigagram or Gg
- Goldcorp's NYSE symbol
- Gudang Garam, an Indonesian cigarette company based in Kediri, East Java
- Kenkyūsha's New Japanese-English Dictionary or Green Goddess
- Gucci, a fashion house with trademark GG
- GG, a bra size

== See also ==
- Gee Gee (disambiguation)
- Gigi (disambiguation)
- G&G (disambiguation)
- Ottawa Gee-Gees, sports teams for University of Ottawa
- PRR GG1, a class of electric locomotives built for the Pennsylvania Railroad
