= Giglio =

Giglio could refer to:

== Places ==
- Giglio Island, an island and municipality in Tuscany, Italy
  - Giglio Castello, Giglio Porto and Giglio Campese, hamlets of the island
  - Battle of Giglio, between the Holy Roman Empire and the Republic of Genoa (1241)

=== Churches ===
- Madonna del Giglio, Acquasparta, Italy
- Santa Maria Zobenigo or Santa Maria del Giglio, Venice, Italy

=== Venues ===
- PalaGiglio, an indoor sports arena in Florence, Italy
- Stadio Giglio, a multi-purpose stadium in Reggio Emilia, Italy
- Teatro del Giglio, a theater in Lucca, Italy

== People ==
- Giglio (name), people with the given name or surname

== Other uses ==
- The giglio, or fleur-de-lis, symbol of Florence, Italy
  - ASSI Giglio Rosso, athletics club based in Florence, Italy
- Giglio (company), Italian luxury brand
- Giglio Society of East Harlem, non-profit Italian-American society
- Giglio v. United States, a U.S. Supreme Court criminal procedure case

== See also ==
- Gigli (disambiguation)
