= Gigliotti =

Gigliotti (pronounced [dʒiʎˈʎɔtti]) is an Italian surname from Catanzaro, probably derived from the medieval masculine name Giglio. Notable people with the surname include:

- Anthony Gigliotti (1922–2001), American clarinet player and music teacher
- Bruno Gigliotti (born 1936), known as Orlando, French-Italian singer, actor and record producer
- Carol Gigliotti, American academic, writer, artist and animal activist
- David Gigliotti (born 1985), French footballer
- Denny Gigliotti (born 1991), Italian footballer
- Donna Gigliotti (born 1955), American film producer
- Emmanuel Gigliotti (born 1987), Argentine footballer
- Frank Gigliotti (born 1942), American politician
- Gilbert L. Gigliotti (born 1961), American literature scholar and academic
- Guillaume Gigliotti (born 1989), French footballer
- Iolanda Cristina Gigliotti (1933–1987), known as Dalida, French-Italian singer and actress
- Lupe Gigliotti (1926–2010), Brazilian actress
- Paul Gigliotti, Canadian musician

== Fictional characters ==
- Bobo Gigliotti, character in the Australian film Fat Pizza

== See also ==
- Metula gigliottii, a species of sea snail
- Giglioli
