= Gigliola =

Gigliola (pronounced [dʒiʎˈʎɔːla]), sometimes Giliola (pronounced [dʒiˈljɔːla]), is an Italian feminine given name derived from giglio 'lily' (cf. English Lily, Susan and variants) or from the masculine name Giglio (Giles). Notable people with the name include:

- Gigliola da Carrara (1379–1416), Marchioness of Ferrara
- Gigliola Cinquetti (born 1947), Italian singer and television presenter
- Gigliola Frazzoni (1923–2016), Italian opera singer
- Gigliola Staffilani (born 1966), American mathematician

== See also ==
- Gigliola, a borough of Montespertoli, Florence
- Gigliolia, is a plant genus of the Orchidaceae
- Giglioli
- Gilioli
