= ESL Pro League Season 5 =

ESL Pro League
- 2017

Tournament information
- Sport: Counter-Strike: Global Offensive
- Location: Dallas, Texas
- Dates: February 7, 2017–June 4, 2017
- Administrator: Electronic Sports League (ESL)
- Teams: 28 teams
- Purse: US$1,000,000

Final positions
- Champions: G2 Esports
- 1st runners-up: North
- 2nd runners-up: SK Gaming; Team Liquid
- MVP: Kenny "kennyS" Schrub

ESL Pro League Season 5 (shortened as EPL Season 5) was a Counter-Strike: Global Offensive tournament run by ESL. It is the fifth season of the ESL Pro League, and has an overall prize pool of $1,000,000 . For the first time, the Finals will take place in Dallas, Texas, from May 30 to June 4, in the Verizon Theatre. Teams from two continents, North America and Europe competed in fourteen team leagues to attempt to qualify for the Finals over a ten-week regular season. Europe's season began with Natus Vincere defeating Astralis and ended with Team EnVyUs defeating Astralis. North America's season started with Cloud9 defeating Rush and ended with Renegades defeating Rush. In the finals, G2 Esports was crowned Season 5's champion after winning a best of five series against North.

== Format ==
The format is the same as EPL Season 4.

Each continent will feature the top 11 teams from last season's ESL Pro League Season 4, one team from the ESEA Season 23: Premier Finals, one team from the ESL Pro League Season 4 Relegation, and two teams from the Season 4 Relegation. North America will have three teams from the Season 4 Relegation after Echo Fox's roster disbands. Teams within each continent will play each other twice to determine the top six qualifier to the Finals in Texas. There will be a total of nine weeks in this phase of the tournament. All games will be played online.

The Finals will consist of twelve teams, six from Europe and six from North America. These teams will be separated into two groups. The group stage will consist of every team in each group playing against each other. The top three teams in each group will play move on to the Playoffs. If three teams are tied for one or two playoffs spot, then the teams will play on Train in an overtime-style best of one tiebreaker. Two teams will be randomly chosen to play in the first match. The winner of that match will play the third team. The winner of the second match will receive a spot in the playoffs. The remaining teams will play in a final third match and the winner of that match will move on to the playoffs. In the playoffs, the Round of Six and the semifinals will be a best of three and the finals will be a best of five. The winner of the finals will win the tournament and the top prize. All games in the Finals will be played offline. The top team in each group will receive a bye and automatically move onto the Semifinals. The other four teams will play in the Round of Six. The winners of those two games will move on to the Semifinals, and the winner of the Semifinals will move onto the Finals. The winner of the grand finals is crowned as champion of ESL Pro League Season 5.

== Teams ==
North America

- Cloud9 (Season 4 #1)
- Immortals (Season 4 #2)
- SK Gaming (Season 4 #3)
- OpTic Gaming (Season 4 #4)
- Renegades (Season 4 #5)
- NRG Esports (Season 4 #6)
- Team Liquid (Season 4 #7)
- Counter Logic Gaming (Season 4 #9)
- Winterfox (Season 4 #10)
- compLexity Gaming (Season 4 #11)
- Misfits (ESEA Premier Season 23)
- Luminosity Gaming (Season 4 Relegation)
- Selfless Gaming^{1} (Season 4 Relegation)
- RUSH (Season 4 Relegation)

^{1}Selfless Gaming released its roster midway through the season. The team finished the season under the banner The Foundation.

Europe

- Fnatic (Season 4 #1)
- Ninjas in Pyjamas (Season 4 #2)
- mousesports (Season 4 #3)
- FaZe Clan (Season 4 #4)
- Team EnVyUs (Season 4 #5)
- North (Season 4 #6)
- Virtus.pro (Season 4 #7)
- Natus Vincere (Season 4 #8)
- G2 Esports (Season 4 #9)
- Astralis (Season 4 #10)
- HellRaisers (Season 4 #11)
- Team Kinguin (ESEA Premier Season 23)
- Heroic (Season 4 Relegation)
- Team LDLC.com (Season 4 Relegation)

== North America ==
=== Broadcast Talent ===
Commentators

- Tim "Brainstorm" Dunne
- Ben "SandMan" Green
- Sam "DaZeD" Marine
- Jordan "Elfishguy" Mays
- John "BLU" Mullen
- Kevin "KaRath" Zhu

Analysts

- Tres "stunna" Saranthus
- Erik "da_bears" Stromberg
- Mark "boq" Wilson

Observers

- Heather "sapphiRe" Garrozo
- David DJ "Prius" Kuntz

=== Standings ===
The North American final standings are shown below. The top six teams go to Dallas to play in the finals and are invited to next season's EPL. Teams that placed seventh through eleventh did not qualify to the finals but are still invited to next seasons EPL. The bottom three teams need to go through various qualifiers in order to qualify for next season's EPL. The teams' in-game leaders are shown first for each roster. (RUSH's, The Foundation's, and Winterfox's – now Animal Squad – in-game leaders are either unknown or do not have an in-game leader.)

The defending EPL champions, Cloud9, made it to the finals once again. In addition, the two time major champions and runners-up from last season, SK Gaming, qualified with the top seed in North America. The same six teams who went to Brazil's finals qualified for the Dallas finals, with OpTic Gaming and Cloud9 winning crucial games while Luminosity Gaming dropped both its games to Team Liquid on the last day of the season, knocking the third Brazilian team out of finals contention.

Final Standings
| Place | Prize Money | Team | W-L | RF-RA | RD | Pts | Roster | Coach |
|---|---|---|---|---|---|---|---|---|
| 1st | TBD | SK Gaming | 18-6 | 363-264 | +99 | 54 | FalleN, coldzera, TACO, felps, fer | dead |
| 2nd | TBD | Team Liquid | 17-7 | 353-277 | +76 | 51 | stanislaw, nitr0, EliGE, jdm64, Twistzz | zews |
| 3rd | TBD | Immortals | 17-7 | 321-255 | +61 | 51 | boltz, steel, HEN1, LUCAS1, kNg, fnx | zakk |
| 4th | TBD | NRG Esports | 15-9 | 349-274 | +75 | 45 | daps, ptr, FugLy, Brehze, LILMAN | Professor_Chaos |
| 5th | TBD | Cloud9 | 15-9 | 323-283 | +40 | 45 | autimatic, n0thing, Stewie2k, Skadoodle, shroud | valens |
| 6th | TBD | OpTic Gaming | 14-10 | 316-291 | +25 | 42 | RUSH, tarik, NAF, mixwell | |
| 7th | US$27,000 | Luminosity Gaming | 13-11 | 312-284 | +28 | 39 | PKL, yeL, destinyy, SHOOWTiME, shz | felippe1 |
| 8th | US$23,000 | Counter Logic Gaming | 13-11 | 320-331 | -11 | 39 | FNS, reltuC, koosta nahtE, Rickeh | ImAPet |
| 9th | US$19,000 | Renegades | 13-11 | 307-291 | +16 | 39 | AZR, jks, USTILO, Nifty, nexa | kassad |
| 10th | US$17,500 | Misfits | 12-12 | 300-296 | +4 | 36 | sgares, SicK, ShahZaM, devoduvek, amaNEk | peacemaker |
| 11th | US$15,000 | compLexity Gaming | 6-18 | 261-334 | -73 | 18 | desi, Slemmy, Surreal, dephh, androidx23 | Warden |
| 12th | US$11,500 | RUSH | 2-22 | 216-369 | -153 | 6 | Toy, blade, aKis, SileNt, rooRoooo | |
| 13th | US$8,000 | The Foundation | 1-23 | 192-375 | -183 | 3 | kaboose, mCe, dizzywi, dee, zqk | Ryu |
| DQ | – | Winterfox | – | – | – | – | RaZ, zewsy, ofnu, emagine, apoc | |

During the season, many roster changes took place.

Team SoloMid's roster transferred to the Misfits after controversy surrounding Misfits captain Sean "sgares" Gares and TSM owner Andy "Reginald" Dinh.

Yassine "Subroza"' Taoufik left Counter Logic Gaming. CLG brought in James "hazed" Cobb, who had just left the team, as a temporary substitute. The team then brought in Ricky "Rickeh" Mulholland from Renegades after the Australian AWPer was let go and replaced with the Swedish player Simon "atter" Atterstam. A few weeks later, Renegades leader Yaman "yam" Ergenekon stepped down from the team and returned to Australia, citing personal reasons. Michael "Uber" Stapells, who had just been released by compLexity Gaming, stepped in to replace yam temporarily. Renegades later announced the transfer of Noah "Nifty" Francis from Selfess Gaming and added Nemanja "nexa" Isaković from Serbia to complete its roster.

Matthew "no_one" Congdon stepped down from the Selfless Gaming active roster as his team reported that he desired to take a break. Chris "cJ-dA-K1nG" Jones was moved up from the substitute role into the active roster. Later, Selfess Gaming owner Steve "Ryu" Rattacasa released his roster. The team played under the name The Foundation. The team brought in various other players, including former teammate of Gabriel "FalleN" Toledo and Fernando "fer" Alvarenga of SK Gaming Caio "zqk" Fonseca from Brazil.

Peter "stanislaw" Jarguz left OpTic Gaming as its in game leader and signed with Team Liquid. Team Liquid then released Spencer "Hiko" Martin and OpTic took in the American veteran as a temporary substitute while also signing Luis "peacemaker" Tadeu as the coach. However, Hiko soon announced that he would not stay with OpTic and peacemaker left OpTic. Once Hiko left, former Cloud9 rifler and current Echo Fox player Ryan "fREAKAZOiD" Abadir stepped in as a temporary substitute. The team then announced that former Splyce player-turned-streamer Jason "jasonR" Ruchelski would be the temporary fifth and in-game leader after standing in for compLexity Gaming and then later stood in for OpTic Gaming.

Samuel "SileNt" Portillo replaced Daniel "virtus" Carrillo and Adam "aKis" Kisseberth replaced Matt "Pollo" Wilson on Rush. Derrick "LILMAN" Boyne left RUSH to go replace Omar "MarkE" Jimenez on NRG Esports and Steven "rooRoooo" Herrell took LILMAN's spot.

Winterfox withdrew from the EPL Season 5 North American division and its spot was transferred to its players. However, just over a week later, the players, now under the banner Animal Squad, forfeit the rest of their matches and were disqualified by ESL.

NRG Esports brought it former Splyce member Andrew "Professor_Chaos" Heintz as a coach.

Team Liquid brings in the 17 year old Russel "Twistzz" VanDulken from Misfits. Misfits also benched Skyler "Relyks" Weaver and acquired two Frenchmen, David "devoduvek" Dobrosavljevic and François "AmaNEk" Delaunay.

Immortals bench Lincoln "fnx" Lau due to internal problems within the team and replace him with Vito "kNg" Giuseppe. fnx will most likely leave Immortals and join his CS 1.6 teammate Raphael "cogu" Camargo.

==== North America Scores ====
North America Results

Results
| | C9 | IMT | SK | OpTic | RNG | NRG | Liquid | CLG | WFX | coL | Misfits | LG | TF | RUSH |
|---|---|---|---|---|---|---|---|---|---|---|---|---|---|---|
| C9 | | 16-9; 8-16 | 12-16; 16-10 | 16-11; 16-6 | 16-19; 16-1 | 10-16; 19-17 | 5-16; 11-16 | 22-19; 9-16 | 16-4; 16-6 | 16-7; 19-15 | 23-25; 4-16 | 6-16; 16-6 | 16-14; 16-12 | 16-9; 16-3 |
| IMT | 9-16; 16-8 | | 11-16; 7-16 | 16-6; 5-16 | 16-3; 4-16 | 16-14; 10-16 | 3-16; 16-9 | 16-8; 16-6 | 16-11; 16-14 | 16-10; 16-12 | 16-7; 16-13 | 22-19; 16-11 | 16-2; 16-5 | 16-13; 16-1 |
| SK | 16-12; 10-16 | 16-11; 16-7 | | 14-16; 16-7 | 16-8; 13-16 | 16-11; 19-16 | 16-9; 14-16 | 12-16; 12-16 | W-F; W-F | 16-10; 16-9 | 16-6; 16-5 | 16-8; 16-8 | 16-10; 16-9 | 16-9; 16-6 |
| OpTic | 11-16; 6-16 | 6-16; 16-5 | 16-14; 7-16 | | 16-5; 19-17 | 9-16; 12-16 | 13-16; 14-16 | 19-15; 16-11 | 16-3; 16-0 | 8-16; 16-7 | 16-3; 16-11 | 16-7; 6-16 | 16-12; 16-8 | 16-5; 16-13 |
| RNG | 6-16; 1-16 | 16-3; 4-16 | 8-16; 16-13 | 5-16; 17-19 | | 16-12; 16-8 | 16-8; TBD | 18-22; 16-2 | 16-4; 16-8 | 16-11; 16-8 | 17-19; 6-16 | 17-19; 10-16 | 16-11; 16-8 | 16-12; 16-5 |
| NRG | 16-10; 17-19 | 14-16; 16-10 | 11-16; 16-19 | 16-9; 16-12 | 22-18; 2-16 | | 22-19; 14-16 | 16-11; 19-6 | 16-6; 16-6 | 7-16; 16-6 | 16-9; 12-16 | 16-10; 16-2 | 16-6; 16-2 | 16-8; 16-5 |
| Liquid | 16-5; 16-11 | 16-3; 9-16 | 16-9; 14-16 | 16-13; 16-14 | 8-16; TBD | 19-22; 16-14 | | 13-16; 10-16 | 16-11; 16-5 | 16-11; 16-9 | 16-11; 16-5 | 16-11; 16-12 | 16-10; 16-8 | 16-3; 16-11 |
| CLG | 19-22; 16-9 | 8-16; 6-16 | 16-12; 16-12 | 15-19; 11-16 | 22-18; 2-16 | 11-16; 16-19 | 16-13; 16-10 | | 16-14; 16-5 | 16-10; 16-12 | 19-17; 12-16 | 10-16; 16-14 | 16-11; 7-16 | 16-8; 16-10 |
| WFX | 6-16; 4-16 | 14-16; 11-16 | F-W; F-W | 3-16; 0-16 | 4-16; 8-16 | 6-16; 6-16 | 11-16; 5-16 | 14-16; 5-16 | | 6-16; 14-16 | 4-16; 11-16 | 19-17; 6-16 | F-W; F-W | 16-7; 14-16 |
| coL | 7-16; 14-16 | 10-16; 12-16 | 10-16; 9-16 | 16-8; 7-16 | 11-16; 8-16 | 16-7; 6-16 | 11-16; 9-16 | 14-16; 9-16 | 16-6; 16-14 | | 2-16; 9-16 | 14-16; 2-16 | 16-10; 16-14 | 16-2; 16-5 |
| Misfits | 25-23; 16-4 | 7-16; 13-16 | 6-16; 5-16 | 3-16; 11-16 | 19-17; 16-6 | 9-16; 16-12 | 11-16; 5-16 | 17-19; 16-12 | 16-4; 16-11 | 16-2; 16-9 | | 13-16; 10-16 | 16-4; 16-5 | 16-12; 16-11 |
| LG | 16-6; 6-16 | 19-22; 11-16 | 8-16; 8-16 | 7-16; 16-6 | 19-17; 16-10 | 10-16; 2-16 | 11-16; 12-16 | 16-10; 14-16 | 17-19; 16-6 | 16-14; 16-2 | 16-13; 16-10 | | W-F; W-F | 16-14; 16-8 |
| TF | 14-16; 12-16 | 2-16; 5-16 | 6-16; 9-16 | 12-16; 8-16 | 11-16; 8-16 | 6-16; 2-16 | 10-16; 8-16 | 11-16; 16-7 | W-F; W-F | 10-16; 14-16 | 5-16; 4-16 | F-W; F-W | | 7-16; 12-16 |
| RUSH | 9-16; 3-16 | 13-16; 1-16 | 12-16; 17-19 | 5-16; 13-16 | 5-16; 12-16 | 8-16; 5-16 | 3-16; 11-16 | 8-16; 10-16 | 7-16; 14-16 | 2-16; 5-16 | 12-16; 11-16 | 14-16; 8-16 | 16-7; 16-12 | |

== Europe ==
=== Broadcast Talent ===
Desk Hosts

- Jason "moses" O'Toole
- Alex "Machine" Richardson

Commentators

- Hugo Byron
- Dan Gaskin
- Henry "HenryG" Greer
- Mitch "Uber" Leslie
- Jack "Jacky" Peters
- Harry "JustHarry" Russell
- Lauren "Pansy" Scott
- Matthew "Sadokist" Trivett

Analyst

- Chad "SPUNJ" Burchill

Observers

- Alex "Rushly" Rush
- Patricia von Halle

=== Standings ===
The European final standings are shown below. The top six teams go to Dallas to play in the finals and are invited to next season's EPL. Teams that placed seventh through eleventh did not qualify to the finals but are still invited to next seasons EPL. The bottom three teams need to go through various qualifiers in order to qualify for next season's EPL. The teams' in-game leaders are shown first for each roster.

The world's number one team and defending major champions, Astralis, and world's number two team, FaZe Clan, failed to qualify for the playoffs, placing eighth and seventh, respectively. Both teams lost the tiebreaker to Natus Vincere and Team EnVyUs. In addition, the runners-up of the last major, Virtus.pro is not automatically invited to next season's EPL after placing 13th. Last season's #2 seed Ninjas in Pyjamas did not qualify for the finals after a rough start to the season.

Final Standings
| Place | Prize Money | Team | W-L | RF-RA | RD | Pts | Roster | Coach |
|---|---|---|---|---|---|---|---|---|
| 1st | TBD | North | 19-7 | 399-284 | +115 | 57 | MSL, cajunb, k0nfig, Magiskb0y, aizy | ruggah |
| 2nd | TBD | G2 Esports | 16-10 | 379-324 | +55 | 48 | shox, bodyy, kennyS, NBK-, apEX | SmithZz |
| 3rd | TBD | mousesports | 16-10 | 347-302 | +45 | 48 | chrisJ, denis, ropz, oskar, IoWel | Imbt |
| 4th | TBD | Fnatic | 15-11 | 334-324 | +10 | 45 | dennis, flusha, olofmeister, JW, KRiMZ | Jumpy |
| 5th | TBD | Natus Vincere | 14-12 | 333-332 | +1 | 42 | seized, s1mple, Edward, flamie, GuardiaN | Andi |
| 6th | TBD | Team EnVyUs | 14-12 | 366-362 | +4 | 42 | Happy, RpK, xms, SIXER, ScreaM | maleK |
| 7th | US$27,000 | FaZe Clan | 14-12 | 365-355 | +10 | 42 | karrigan, allu, rain, kioShiMa, NiKo | RobbaN |
| 8th | US$23,000 | Astralis | 14-12 | 361-340 | +21 | 42 | gla1ve, dev1ce, Xyp9x, dupreeh, Kjaerbye | zonic |
| 9th | US$19,000 | Heroic | 12-14 | 357-350 | +7 | 36 | Snappi, valde, niko, JUGi, MODDII | |
| 10th | US$17,500 | Ninjas in Pyjamas | 12-14 | 312-353 | -43 | 36 | Xizt, GeT RiGhT, f0rest, friberg, draken | THREAT |
| 11th | US$15,000 | Team LDLC.com | 11-15 | 326-360 | -34 | 33 | Ex6TenZ, to1nou, ALEX, mistou, Maniac | Krav |
| 12th | US$11,500 | HellRaisers | 10-16 | 325-363 | -38 | 30 | ANGE1, bondik, Zero, STYKO, DeadFox | Johnta |
| 13th | US$8,000 | Virtus.pro | 9-17 | 299-361 | -62 | 27 | NEO, TaZ, pashaBiceps, Snax, byali | kuben |
| 14th | US$4,000 | Team Kinguin | 6-19 | 289-382 | -93 | 18 | Hyper, SZPERO, mouz, rallen, MICHU | Loord |

During the season, several changes took place.

The Danish Team Dignitas roster and then organization mutually parted ways and the roster signed with Danish football (soccer) club F.C. Copenhagen and Danish film company Nordisk Film. The team was called North. North then released Ruben "Rubino" Villarroel at the request of the Norwegian and signed FaZe Clan's Philip "aizy" Aistrup.

FaZe Clan brought in its former player Joakim "jkaem" Myrbostad after aizy left for North as a temporary replacement to play at DreamHack Las Vegas 2017. FaZe then announced the signing of mousesports's star Bosnian player Nikola "NiKo" Kovač after the Vegas tournament. mousesports then brought back Chris "chrisJ" de Jong after the Dutch player was benched to replace NiKo. mousesports then bench Timo "Spiidi" Richter, citing a lack of motivation after the ELEAGUE Major 2017, and sign the young Estonian Robin "ropz" Kool.

Perhaps the biggest change was the "French shuffle," which was led by Nathan "NBK-" Schmitt and Richard "shox" Papillon. NBK-. Kenny "kennyS" Schrub and, Dan "apEX" Madesclaire left Team EnVyUs for G2 Esport to join shox and Alexandre "bodyy" Pianaro; in addition, former G2 AWPer Édouard "SmithZz" Dubourdeaux moved to the coaching position. The remaining two G2 players, Cédric "RpK" Guipouy and Adil "ScreaM" Benrlitom, left the team. Rpk joined Vincent "Happy" Cervoni and Christophe "SIXER" Xia on EnVyUs and EnVyUs signed Alexandre "xms" Forté and David "devoduvek" Dobrosavljevic. ScreaM initially said that he was going to be a temporary stand-in for EnVyUs, but then later officially announced that he signed with the team. EnVyUs then moved devoduvek to the inactive roster.

Heroic bought out Jakob "JUGi" Hansen from Tricked Esport and release Michael "Friis" Jørgensen from the team.

Long time Natus Vincere player and coach Sergey "starix" Ischuk left the team and stepped down as the coach. He was replaced by Na'Vi analyst Andrey ‘Andi’ Prokhorov. starix then joined Team Spirit as a player.

Ninjas in Pyjamas took in William "draken" Sundin from Epsilon eSports and benched Jacob "pyth" Mourujärvi.

Team Kinguin release Damian "Furlan" Kisłowski and bring in Bartosz "Hyper" Wolny as the new in-game leader.

==== Europe Scores ====
Europe Results

Results
| | Fnatic | NiP | mouz | FaZe | nV | North | VP | Na'Vi | G2 | Astralis | HR | TK | Heroic | LDLC |
|---|---|---|---|---|---|---|---|---|---|---|---|---|---|---|
| Fnatic | | 7-16; 14-16 | 16-10; 16-6 | 16-10; 13-16 | 16-9; 14-16 | 5-16; 12-16 | 16-2; 5-16 | 7-16; 16-12 | 16-14; 5-16 | 6-16; 16-14 | 16-10; 16-14 | 16-10; 16-8 | 16-11; 6-16 | 16-5; 16-13 |
| NiP | 16-7; 16-14 | | 8-16; 10-16 | 9-16; 9-16 | 13-16; 16-13 | 1-16; 3-16 | 6-16; 16-9 | 12-16; 16-8 | 10-16; 9-16 | 12-16; 16-12 | 16-14; 16-5 | 16-12; 16-14 | 11-16; 7-16 | 16-7; 16-14 |
| mouz | 10-16; 6-16 | 16-11; 16-7 | | 10-16; 19-17 | 16-8; 16-12 | 16-8; 16-5 | 5-16; 11-16 | 16-8; 16-0 | 10-16; 11-16 | 16-8; 11-16 | 16-12; 16-8 | 16-5; 16-14 | 4-16; 16-12 | 16-7; 10-16 |
| FaZe | 10-16; 16-13 | 16-9; 16-9 | 16-10; 17-19 | | 16-12; 11-16 | 16-14; 25-22 | 16-11; 16-4 | 9-16; 6-16 | 4-16; 14-16 | 14-16; 16-9 | 14-16; 19-15 | 6-16; 8-16 | 19-16; 16-7 | 16-9; 13-16 |
| nV | 9-16; 16-14 | 16-13; 13-16 | 8-16; 12-16 | 12-16; 16-11 | | 13-16; 17-19 | 16-5; 25-22 | 6-16; 12-16 | 16-11; 16-12 | 16-13; 16-13 | 16-10; 7-16 | 13-16; 11-16 | 16-9; 16-12 | 16-12; 16-10 |
| North | 16-5; 16-12 | 16-1; 16-3 | 8-16; 5-16 | 14-16; 22-25 | 16-7; 19-17 | | 16-6; 16-7 | 16-4; 16-19 | 16-13; 16-10 | 16-4; 11-16 | 13-16; 16-10 | 16-11; 16-5 | 19-16; 16-10 | 16-6; 16-7 |
| VP | 2-16; 16-5 | 16-6; 9-16 | 16-5; 16-11 | 11-16; 4-16 | 5-16; 22-25 | 6-16; 7-16 | | 10-16; 16-8 | 16-10; 13-16 | 16-8; 19-15 | 10-16; 10-16 | 15-19; 16-9 | 1-16; 9-16 | 5-16; 13-16 |
| Na'Vi | 7-16; 16-12 | 16-12; 8-16 | 8-16; 0-16 | 16-9; 16-6 | 16-6; 16-12 | 4-16; 19-16 | 16-10; 8-16 | | 10-16; 16-13 | 16-11; 4-16 | 16-5; 11-16 | 16-6; 16-5 | 14-16; 25-22 | 8-16; 10-16 |
| G2 | 14-16; 16-5 | 16-10; 16-9 | 16-10; 16-11 | 16-4; 16-14 | 11-16; 12-16 | 13-16; 10-16 | 10-16; 16-13 | 16-10; 13-16 | | 16-12; 16-9 | 15-19; 9-16 | 16-8; 19-16 | 16-13; 13-16 | 16-12; 16-5 |
| Astralis | 16-6; 14-16 | 16-12; 12-16 | 8-16; 16-11 | 16-14; 9-16 | 13-16; 13-16 | 4-16; 16-11 | 8-16; 15-19 | 11-16; 16-4 | 12-16; 9-16 | | 16-9; 16-14 | 16-12; 16-9 | 16-10; 16-7 | 16-8; 25-23 |
| HR | 10-16; 14-16 | 14-16; 5-16 | 12-16; 8-16 | 16-14; 15-19 | 10-16; 16-7 | 16-13; 10-16 | 16-10; 16-10 | 5-16; 16-11 | 19-15; 16-9 | 9-16; 14-16 | | 16-9; 6-16 | 12-16; 16-6 | 7-16; 11-16 |
| TK | 8-16; 10-16 | 12-16; 14-16 | 5-16; 14-16 | 16-6; 16-8 | 16-13; 16-11 | 11-16; 5-16 | 19-15; 9-16 | 6-16; 5-16 | 8-16; 16-19 | 7-16; 9-16 | 9-16; 16-6 | | 10-16; 10-16 | 13-16; 7-16 |
| Heroic | 11-16; 16-6 | 16-11; 16-7 | 16-4; 12-16 | 16-19; 7-16 | 9-16; 12-16 | 16-19; 10-16 | 16-1; 16-9 | 16-14; 22-25 | 13-16; 16-13 | 10-16; 7-16 | 12-16; 6-13 | 16-10; 16-10 | | 16-12; 14-16 |
| LDLC | 5-16; 13-16 | 7-16; 14-16 | 7-16; 16-10 | 9-16; 16-13 | 12-16; 10-16 | 6-16; 7-16 | 16-5; 16-13 | 16-8; 16-10 | 12-16; 5-16 | 8-16; 23-25 | 16-7; 16-11 | 16-13; 16-7 | 12-16; 16-14 | |

== Finals ==
The finalized teams are shown below. Each team's world ranking for May 29, 2017 is also shown.

North America

- SK Gaming (3)
- Team Liquid (19)
- Immortals (14)
- NRG Esports (31)
- Cloud9 (12)
- OpTic Gaming (10)

Europe

- North (5)
- G2 Esports (4)
- mousesports (15)
- Fnatic (11)
- Natus Vincere (6)
- Team EnVyUs (25)

=== Broadcast talent ===
Host

- Alex "Goldenboy" Mendez

Backstage Reporter

- Tres "stunna" Saranthus

Desk Host

- Jason "moses" O'Toole

Commentators

- Hugo Byron
- Henry "HenryG" Greer
- Christian "Chrispian" Hart
- Sam "DaZeD" Marine
- John "BLU" Mullen
- Alex "Machine" Richardson
- Harry "JustHarry" Russell
- Lauren "Pansy" Scott
- Matthew "Sadokist" Trivett

Analysts

- Chad "SPUNJ" Burchill
- Halvor "vENdetta" Gulestøl
- Janko "YNk" Paunović

Observers

- Heather "sapphiRe" Garrozo
- DJ "Prius" Kuntz

=== Group stage ===
==== Group A ====
SK Gaming dominated the North American scene during the season, but the team struggled in the latter stages of the season, including a 0–2 loss against Counter Logic Gaming. However, the two time major champions still came up on top and comes into the tournament with a premier event win, taking the IEM Sydney 2017 title after defeating FaZe Clan. Its Brazilian counterparts, Immortals, were steady during the season, almost always in the top 6; however, the release of Counter-Strike veteran Lincoln "fnx" Lau due to internal problems might hurt the team. The defending EPL champions are also in group A, but Cloud9 did not find as much success as it did last season, barely cutting the top 6. G2 Esports started the season very slow with its newly formed French superteam after the player shuffle that involved G2, Team EnVyUs, Team LDLC.com. and Vexed Gaming. However, after starting 1–8, G2 won its last 15 of 17 matches to take second place in the European season. The other main team that was involved in the French shuffle was EnVyUs, as it took in Cédric "RpK" Guipouy and Adil "ScreaM" Benrlitom form G2 Esports. EnVyUs barely scraped by into the finals after defeating the number one team in the world, Astralis, 2–0 to cap its regular season. Fnatic also takes part in the group, as the most decorated CS:GO team continues to try to find new form as it did in 2015. Like G2, Fnatic also struggled to find initial success before settling in.

| Pos | Team | W | L | RF | RA | RD |
|---|---|---|---|---|---|---|
| 1 | G2 Esports | 3 | 2 | 62 | 63 | -1 |
| 2 | Team EnVyUs | 3 | 2 | 71 | 48 | +23 |
| 3 | SK Gaming | 3 | 2 | 57 | 47 | +10 |
| 4 | Fnatic | 3 | 2 | 62 | 56 | +6 |
| 5 | Immortals | 2 | 3 | 48 | 66 | -18 |
| 6 | Cloud9 | 1 | 4 | 48 | 68 | -20 |

Group A Matches
| Team | Score | Map | Score | Team |
|---|---|---|---|---|
| SK Gaming | 16 | Cobblestone | 7 | Cloud9 |
| G2 Esports | 16 | Nuke | 14 | Team EnVyUs |
| G2 Esports | 4 | Inferno | 16 | Cloud9 |
| Immortals | 9 | Inferno | 16 | Fnatic |
| Fnatic | 16 | Inferno | 9 | Team EnVyUs |
| SK Gaming | 16 | Mirage | 5 | Immortals |
| SK Gaming | 16 | Cache | 3 | Fnatic |
| Cloud9 | 11 | Cobblestone | 16 | Team EnVyUs |
| Fnatic | 16 | Nuke | 11 | Cloud9 |
| G2 Esports | 10 | Overpass | 16 | Immortals |
| SK Gaming | 6 | Cobblestone | 16 | G2 Esports |
| Immortals | 2 | Cobblestone | 16 | Team EnVyUs |
| Immortals | 16 | Mirage | 8 | Cloud9 |
| SK Gaming | 3 | Inferno | 16 | Team EnVyUs |
| G2 Esports | 16 | Overpass | 11 | Fnatic |
| Fnatic | 6 | Train | 10 | Team EnVyUs |
| SK Gaming | 1 | Train | 4 | Team EnVyUs |
| SK Gaming | 4 | Train | 0 | Fnatic |

SK Gaming dominated the first day of the group stage, going 3-0 and not losing a single terrorist round, but lost both its games the second day by a large margin. Meanwhile, G2 Esports struggled immensely, suffering a loss to Cloud9 and barely winning against the sixth seeded Tean EnVyUs; however, the French superteam changed plans and defeated its remaining opponents after a loss to Immortals. EnVyUs surprised many as the second French team upset SK 16–3. Cloud9 only had one win against G2 but struggled to find success otherwise as the defending EPL champions fell in the group stage. Immortals also struggled with its new addition kNg as the team fought to take two games in the group stage. Fnatic defeated all the teams it was supposed to beat as the Swedish legends ended the group stage tied in second place; it nearly secured a playoffs spot, but it fell to G2 in the last match of the group stage. Immortals and Cloud9 were out at this point. G2 secured first seed as it defeated EnVyUs, SK, and Fnatic while the three aforementioned teams were required to play in a tiebreaker. EnVyUs squeaked out a win against Fnatic in a tiebreaker that went to three overtimes. EnVyUs easily defeated SK 4–1 to secure second seed in the group and SK swept Fnatic to secure the third seed.

==== Group B ====
North had the most wins out of any team in the season with 19. However, the Danish team is also known to struggle in offline tournaments, including losing to the relatively unknown Chiefs Esports Club in IEM Sydney and getting knocked out in the group stage. mousesports also seemed to be more revitalized after FaZe Clan bought out its star player Nikola "NiKo" Kovač. The team activated Tomáš "oskar" Šťastný from the bench and brought in the young Estonian Robin "ropz" Kool in place of Timo "Spiidi" Richter, and mousesports placed third. Natus Vincere (Na'Vi) barely made it into the playoffs with EnVyUs via tiebreaker rules. The team struggled after it released Danylo "Zeus" Teslenko in favor of Oleksandr "s1mple" Kostyliev from Team Liquid. Sergey "starix" Ischuk was to lead the team as the coach, but Valve implemented rules that severely limited the coach's role. starix then left the team, leaving the team in question. Na'Vi fell into turmoil as it did not produce results as it did when it was a top three team; on the other hand, Zeus's new team, Gambit Gaming saw new light as the experienced leader turned around Gambit's mediocre results into those of a top ten team. s1mple's former team had a strong showing in the regular season as Team Liquid announced the leaving of Jacob "Pimp" Winneche and signed Russel "Twistzz" Van Dulken from Misfits midseason and then rose to near the top of the standings. NRG Esports made it to the finals for the second straight season despite its struggles within the team. OpTic Gaming nearly missed the playoffs, but with the team winning one of its games against compLexity Gaming and Luminosity Gaming losing both its games to Team Liquid, OpTic qualified. OpTic is currently using former Splyce player turned streamer Jason "jasonR" Ruchelski as a temporary stand-in and former long time Counter Logic Gaming member James "hazed" Cobb as a trial coach.

| Pos | Team | W | L | RF | RA | RD |
|---|---|---|---|---|---|---|
| 1 | North | 4 | 1 | 77 | 68 | +9 |
| 2 | mousesports | 4 | 1 | 84 | 68 | +16 |
| 3 | Team Liquid | 3 | 2 | 64 | 60 | +4 |
| 4 | OpTic Gaming | 2 | 3 | 66 | 72 | -6 |
| 5 | Natus Vincere | 2 | 3 | 68 | 60 | +8 |
| 6 | NRG Esports | 0 | 5 | 51 | 83 | -32 |

Group B Matches
| Team | Score | Map | Score | Team |
|---|---|---|---|---|
| North | 19 | Nuke | 17 | mousesports |
| Team Liquid | 4 | Train | 16 | Natus Vincere |
| NRG Esports | 16 | Cache | 19 | OpTic Gaming |
| mousesports | 19 | Cobblestone | 15 | Natus Vincere |
| Team Liquid | 16 | Nuke | 5 | OpTic Gaming |
| North | 16 | Cobblestone | 7 | NRG Esports |
| North | 16 | Mirage | 13 | Natus Vincere |
| Team Liquid | 16 | Mirage | 13 | NRG Esports |
| mousesports | 16 | Cobblestone | 12 | OpTic Gaming |
| NRG Esports | 5 | Cobblestone | 16 | Natus Vincere |
| North | 16 | Mirage | 14 | OpTic Gaming |
| Team Liquid | 12 | Inferno | 16 | mousesports |
| Natus Vincere | 8 | Cobblestone | 16 | OpTic Gaming |
| North | 10 | Cobblestone | 16 | Team Liquid |
| mousesports | 16 | Mirage | 10 | NRG Esports |

North dominated, only dropping one map to Team Liquid in the very last game of the group stage. mousesports also showed new form after NiKo left the team, as oskar and ropz both lead way to a 4–1 record, only losing to the top seeded North. NRG Esports, for the second straight EPL Finals, failed to win a game, going 0-5 for two straight seasons despite finishing fourth this season in North America. Natus Vincere, OpTic Gaming, and Team Liquid fought for a third spot. Na'Vi needed to defeat OpTic in order to have a chance to make the playoffs; if Liquid defeated North, then Na'Vi would play a tiebreaker against Liquid and if Liquid lost, Na'Vi would secure third seed in the playoffs. OpTic needed to beat Na'Vi and have Team Liquid lose in order to play a three way tiebreaker for the third seed. However, Liquid defeated North and OpTic defeated Na'Vi, giving Liquid sole possession of third.

=== Playoffs ===
==== Bracket ====
Round of 6
mousesports | 0
SK Gaming | 2
Team EnVyUs | 1
Team Liquid | 2

Semifinals
G2 Esports | 2
SK Gaming | 0
North | 2
Team Liquid | 0

Finals
G2 Esports | 3
North | 1

==== Round of 6 Scores ====
SK showed form as it did in day one rather than day two, as it ran over mousesports. oskar and ropz kept mousesports close in the game as mousesport's terrorist side went head to head against SK's defense., SK's terrorist side proved relentless against the mousesports counter-terrorist side as FalleN, fer, and coldzera had mousesports scrambling, even when the European team had man advantages, including FalleN winning a 1 vs 3 clutch. SK only allowed one round to go by when playing on the terrorist side.

EnVyUs did not show up the third day of the EPL finals as it did in the group stage. Liquid nearly ran away with the first map, but a few misplays from the American side and endurance from the French side allowed EnVyUs come back from a 4–11 deficit to a 16–14 win. Train was also a close game, as it required a 1 vs. 2 jdm64 clutch to be the turning point of the game and Liquid was able to run away with the game. The third game was a different story, as Liquid dominated the first half and only allowed 1 round. EnVyUs attempted a comeback but it was only able to take three rounds before falling. jdm64 lead the way for Liquid after months of struggle from the AWPer.

Round of 6
| Team | Score | Map | Score | Team |
|---|---|---|---|---|
| mousesports | 7 | Mirage | 16 | SK Gaming |
| mousesports | 8 | Cache | 16 | SK Gaming |
| mousesports | – | Cobblestone | – | SK Gaming |
| Team EnVyUs | 16 | Cobblestone | 14 | Team Liquid |
| Team EnVyUs | 10 | Train | 16 | Team Liquid |
| Team EnVyUs | 4 | Nuke | 16 | Team Liquid |

==== Semifinals Scores ====
The first semifinals matchup featured a rematch of Season 3's grand finals, in which SK Gaming, then with Luminosity Gaming, defeated G2 Esports in a tense 3–2 victory. However, both teams switched things up since that series, as SK replaced fnx with felps and G2 formed the French superteam. The superteam came out on top in a fairly close best of three set. Rounds lost by SK when G2 had poor buys cost the Brazilian team in the end and G2 moved on to the finals.

North blew out Liquid in the first map of their best of three series on Nuke as a 13–2 lead at the half proved to be a huge blow to Liquid. The second map was much closer, however. Key players for both teams did not show up as Emil "Magisk" Reif only had 16 kills for North and Nicholas "nitr0" Cannella had only 15 kills for Liquid. Liquid had a massive 11–4 lead, but North brought it back all the way to overtime. Jonathan "EliGE" Jablonowski's 35 kills proved to be too little as North pulled off a 19–17 overtime win against the American team.

Semifinals
| Team | Score | Map | Score | Team |
|---|---|---|---|---|
| G2 Esports | 16 | Cache | 12 | SK Gaming |
| G2 Esports | 16 | Overpass | 12 | SK Gaming |
| G2 Esports | – | Cobblestone | – | SK Gaming |
| North | 16 | Nuke | 5 | Team Liquid |
| North | 19 | Mirage | 17 | Team Liquid |
| North | – | Inferno | – | Team Liquid |

==== Finals Scores ====
Both first seeds proved their dominance in the semifinals. G2 was fresh off a win from DreamHack Tours and aimed to make it two in a row while North tries to win its first premier tournament since EPICENTER 2016, in which it defeated Virtus.pro when the team was signed with Team Dignitas.

G2 and North both started off strong as the game on Cache nearly went the distance. In the end, G2 came up on top in a game Kenny "kennyS" Schrub dominated. G2 had no problem winning on North's map pick, Cobblestone. One of North's stars, Emil "Magisk" Reif, had trouble after getting just 8 kills. North then adjusted on Overpass and took off to a massive 14–2 lead. However, North then struggled and G2 adjusted and G2's leader, Richard "shox" Papillon, lead his team to a comeback. The team only allowed one round all the way up to round number 30, when North finally finished the job and barely took away the third map. However, the momentum swiftly moved into G2's favor, as Inferno turned into a clinic and G2 took its first premier tournament with the new lineup.

Finals
| Team | Score | Map | Score | Team |
|---|---|---|---|---|
| G2 Esports | 16 | Cache | 13 | North |
| G2 Esports | 16 | Cobblestone | 5 | North |
| G2 Esports | 14 | Overpass | 16 | North |
| G2 Esports | 16 | Inferno | 3 | North |
| G2 Esports | | Nuke | | North |

=== Finals standings ===
Final Standings
| Place | Prize Money | Team |
|---|---|---|
| 1st | US$225,000 | G2 Esports |
| 2nd | US$100,000 | North |
| 3rd – 4th | US$60,000 | SK Gaming |
| 3rd – 4th | US$60,000 | Team Liquid |
| 5th – 6th | US$45,000 | mousesports |
| 5th – 6th | US$45,000 | Team EnVyUs |
| 7th – 8th | US$40,000 | Fnatic |
| 7th – 8th | US$40,000 | OpTic Gaming |
| 9th – 10th | US$35,000 | Immortals |
| 9th – 10th | US$35,000 | Natus Vincere |
| 11th – 12th | US$32,500 | Cloud9 |
| 11th – 12th | US$32,500 | NRG Esports |
