= G&G =

G&G may stand for:

- Ekaterina Gordeeva and Sergei Grinkov (skaters)
- G&G Entertainment
- G&G Sindikatas, a Lithuanian hip hop/rap band formed in 1996
