= Giglioli =

Giglioli (pronounced [dʒiʎˈʎɔːli]) is an Italian surname derived from either Giglio Island, Tuscany, or the medieval masculine name Giglio/Gilio. Notable persons with the name include:

- Enrico Hillyer Giglioli (1845–1909), Italian zoologist and anthropologist
- Giulio Giglioli (1886–1957), Italian art historian
- George Giglioli (1897–1975), Anglo-Italian physician and malariologist

== See also ==
- Gigliolia
- Gigliola
- Gilioli
- Gigliotti
