= GII =

GII or variation, may refer to

- Gemmological Institute of India
- Global Information Infrastructure
- Global Innovation Index
- Guyana Islamic Institute
- Gender Inequality Index
- Siguiri Airport, Guinea (by IATA code)
- Grumman Gulfstream II (GII) business jet

== See also ==
- G2 (disambiguation)
