= Gilioli =

Gilioli (pronounced [dʒiˈljɔːli]) is an Italian surname derived from either Giglio Island, Tuscany, or the medieval masculine name Gilio/Giglio. Notable people with the name include:

- Émile Gilioli (1911–1977), French-Italian sculptor
- Giacinto Gilioli (1594–1665), Italian painter

== See also ==
- Giglioli
- Gigliola
