= Jens Hilgers =

German serial entrepreneur (born 1975)

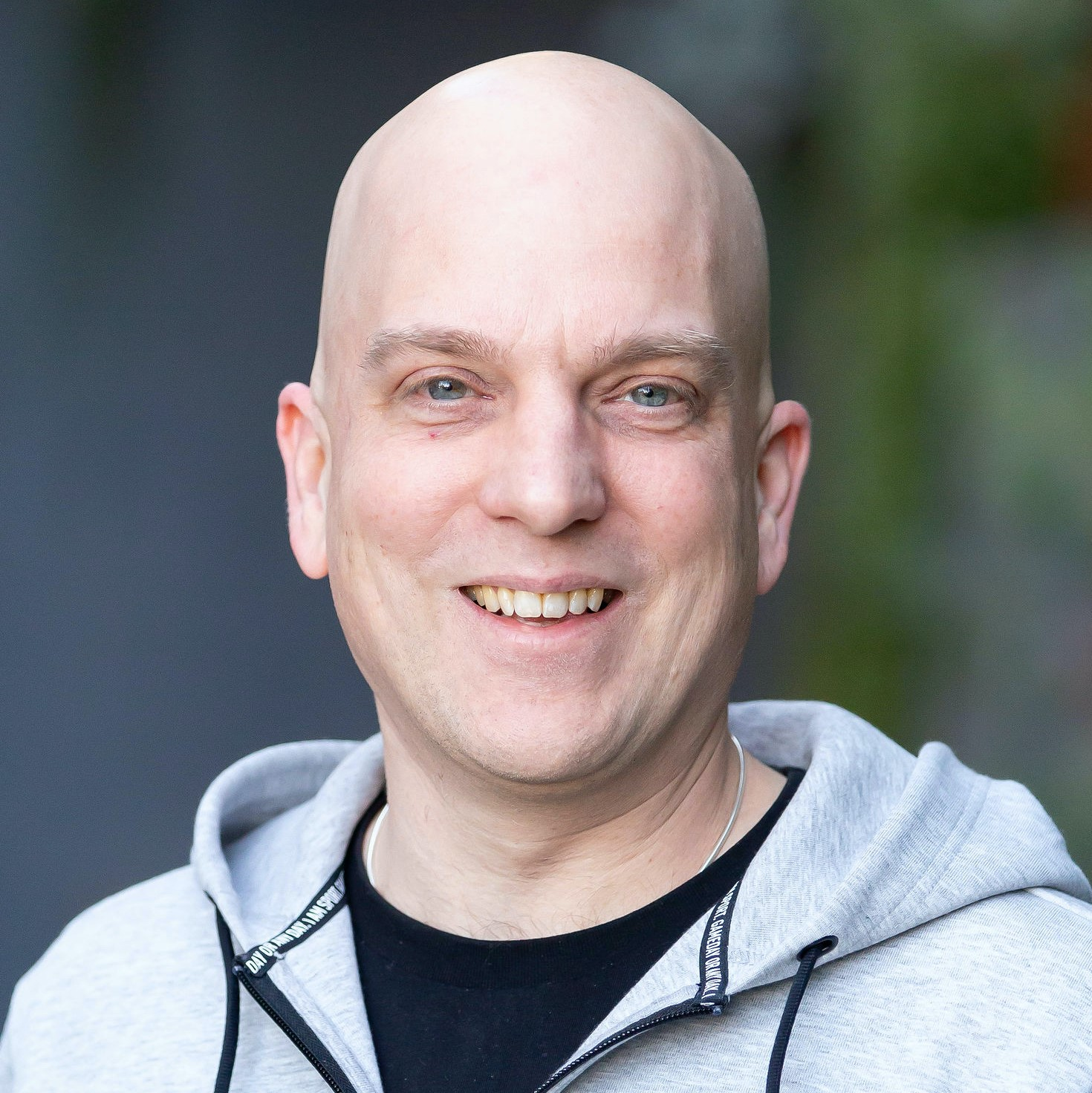
- Born: 1975 (age 50–51); Cologne, Germany
- Occupation: Entrepreneur
- Years active: 1997–present

Jens Hilgers (born 1975) is a German entrepreneur who works in the esports industry. He was the founding CEO of the esports production company Electronic Sports League (ESL), and is a co-founder and the CEO of Bayes (formerly Dojo Madness), an esports data company based in Berlin. In 2014, he co-founded G2 Esports together with Carlos "Ocelote" Rodriguez, and currently serves as its chairman. He is also the founding general partner of BITKRAFT Ventures, a global early and mid-stage investment platform for gaming, esports, and a new technology named Web3. He has been credited as an early pioneer of the esports industry.

== Background ==
Jens Hilgers, a German native, was born in the city of Cologne in 1975. He pursued his academic education in the field of software development and successfully completed his studies in 1998. Hilgers attributes his fondness for product development to his childhood exposure to the plastic construction toy Lego and the Amiga 500 computer.

== Career ==
Hilgers began his esports career in 1997. While in college, he built Gamers.de, a news portal for online PC games; later he launched the first German Clan League and created Gamers Gathering, a European LAN-Party.

=== ESL ===
In 2000, Hilgers founded Turtle Entertainment GmbH, based in Cologne, Germany. Turtle Entertainment is the parent company of the Electronic Sports League (ESL), one of the world's largest esports organizations. Hilgers served as the CEO of the company until 2010, at which point he transitioned to chairman of the board. During his ten-year tenure as CEO, Hilgers helped expand the company into becoming a major brand that contributed to the esports industry. The company operates online platforms and TV studios that broadcast tournaments in the gaming industry. In 2015, when Hilgers was the chairman of ESL, Modern Times Group purchased a majority stake in the company for $86 million. Furthermore, Hilgers served as CEO at GIGA Digital Television GmbH and co-owns G2 Esports, a competitive esports team located in Berlin, Germany. In 2022, ESL was acquired in whole by the Saudi Arabian SAVVY Games Group, a subsidiary of the PIF for 1.050.000.000 US$ and marked Hilgers’ final exit from the business, yet also made it Germany’s first Gaming Company to see a Unicorn Exit.

=== Bayes ===
In 2014, Hilgers founded Bayes (formerly Dojo Madness), an esports startup based in Berlin, Germany. Bayes pioneered AI-based Esports coaching with its League of Legends Coaching APP LOLSUMO and moved to become a provider for professional esports data in partnership with Sport Radar. In 2017, under the leadership of Raine Ventures and participation from Kakao's K Cube Ventures and investors, Dojo raised a total of $12.75 million in another round of funding. In 2020, Bayes announced the closing of a $6 million funding round, which included participation from the Pohlad Family investment group, Fertitta Capital, Sony Innovation Fund, and other sports and media investors.

=== G2 Esports ===
In 2015, Hilgers co-founded G2 Esports (formerly Gamers2), one of the leading global esports and entertainment brands, alongside League of Legends player-turned-team owner, Carlos ‘Ocelot’ Rodriguez. Since its inception, G2 Esports has raised $27.3M, including a $10M investment round from Joseph Tsai. The European esports organization is headquartered in Berlin, Germany, with players competing in games like League of Legends, Valorant, Counter-Strike: Global Offensive, Hearthstone, Rocket League, Rainbow Six Siege, and Sim Racing.

=== BITKRAFT Ventures ===
In 2015, Jens Hilgers launched the company BITKRAFT Ventures, a global investment platform for gaming and Web3. BITKRAFT has been the most active gaming venture capital firm and lead investor in 2020 and 2021, according to research from Invest Game and Drake Star Partners. As of April 2023, BITKRAFT Ventures has $830 million in assets under management and has expanded its footprint to Asia.
