= Trent Zelazny =

American writer (1976–2024)

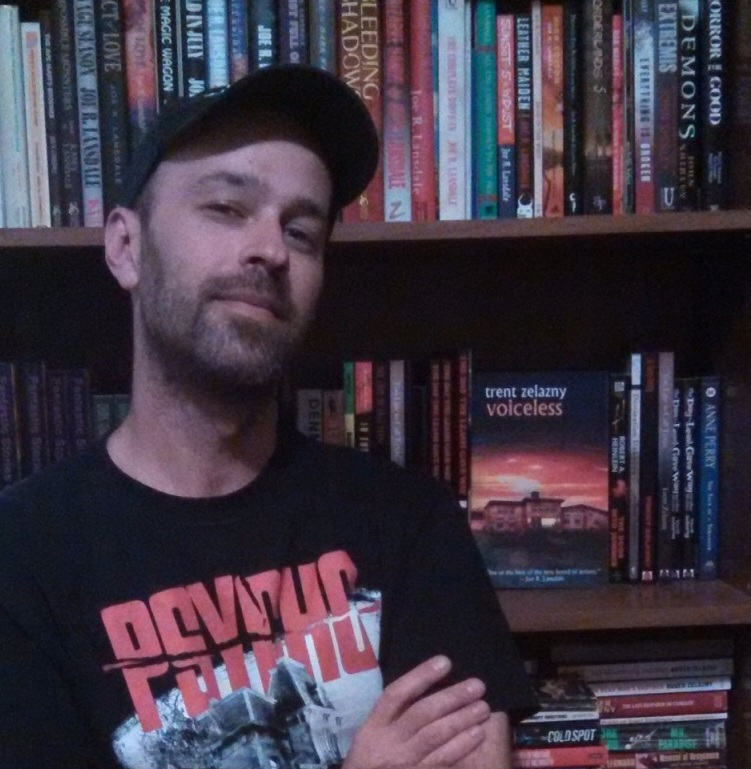
- Born: November 28, 1976; Santa Fe, New Mexico, U.S.
- Died: November 28, 2024 (aged 48)
- Occupation: Author
- Writing career
- Genres: Horror, mystery, science fiction, fantasy
- Notable works: Destination Unknown, To Sleep Gently, Fractal Despondency, The Day the Leash Gave Way and Other Stories, People Person
- Website: trentzelazny.com

Jonathan "Trent" Zelazny (November 28, 1976 – November 28, 2024) was an American author of crime, horror, and fantastical fiction. He wrote as Trent Zelazny.

== Background ==
Zelazny was the son of science fiction writer Roger Zelazny. He had a son from a previous marriage, Corwin Random Zelazny (born 1996), who is named after characters from his father's classic The Chronicles of Amber series. He was an intermittent martial artist since the age of five; he studied multiple styles including Taekwondo, Tang Soo Do, Aikido, Iron Shirt, Iron Palm, Baguazhang, Judo, and he investigated Wing Chun and Jeet Kune Do.

Zelazny moved to Florida, and then he took some time away from writing, having developed severe alcoholism, as well as having lost his fiancée to suicide. He then attempted suicide himself, but he survived, about which he repeatedly said that he was grateful. In a later interview, he reported that "a lot of hard work and the support of family and friends ... and rehab" helped him through this difficult period.

Zelazny suffered a cerebellar stroke in September 2024, which led to reduced mobility. Trent's sister, Shannon Zelazny, reported on Facebook that he made "remarkable progress learning how to walk again," but "was then hit with acute liver failure, which resulted in his hospitalization and death." He died of acute liver failure on November 28, 2024, his 48th birthday.

== Writing career ==
Zelazny wrote across genres, his works encompassing crime, horror, science fiction and fantasy, with his horror novels receiving the most recognition.

Zelazny started his writing career in 1999 with two short stories, "Hope Is an Inanimate Desire" and "Harold Asher and His Vomiting Dogs," followed by additional stories through the early 2000s. In 2001 he began to publish more frequently. His story "Lovely Day for Beating an Old Guy," published in the Brian Knight-edited anthology Random Acts of Weirdness (2002), was the first piece to attract attention. His 2009 short story "The House of Happy Mayhem" received honorable mention for Ellen Datlow’s “Best Horror of the Year” award.

Zelazny sold a novel (Destination Unknown) in 2008, though it was not released until 2011; his first published book was the short story collection The Day the Leash Gave Way and Other Stories (Fantastic Books: Wilder Publications, 2009). The book was reissued by On July 28, 2014, Black Curtain Press in 2014 with two additional stories and an introduction by the author.

Following a hiatus, he returned to writing in 2011 with the novella Fractal Despondency (Black Curtain Press), followed the same year by Shadowboxer, To Sleep Gently, and A Crack in Melancholy Time (Crossroad Press) and his earlier novel Destination Unknown (iBooks). To Sleep Gently received the 2012 Nightmare Award.

Zelazny's first play, Not Any Little Girl, premiered in Santa Fe, New Mexico in late April 2012. It later became an Australian bestseller. Other plays followed, also performed in Santa Fe. A film buff, he contributed to the Jean Cocteau Cinema, an independent movie theater in Santa Fe owned by A Song of Ice and Fire author George R. R. Martin, for which he wrote "Previews." For this theater, he and Martin co-produced Godson, a musical play written by Zelazny's late father.

2012 also included the release of several other works: the short story "Black Whispers" in the Richard Salter-edited shared-world anthology World's Collider (Nightscape Press); the novella Butterfly Potion (Nightscape Press); and the novel Too Late to Call Texas (Black Curtain Press), which was praised by fellow writer Neil Gaiman. Gaiman called Zelazny a "powerful and good writer," and "[s]omeone who’s been through hell and come out, I hope, the other side." The novel was reissued on September 24, 2013, with a new cover and an introduction by Billie Sue Mosiman.

Among Zelazny's later writings were the novelette People Person (Black Curtain Press, 2013), considered by many to be his best work to date, and the novel Voiceless (Evil Jester Press, 2014).

=== Editing ===
In 2012 Zelazny published his first collection as editor, the anthology Mirages: Tales from Authors of the Macabre (Black Curtain Press, 2012), which contains work by Tom Piccirilli, E.A. Black, Joseph S. Pulver, Kealan Patrick Burke, Jeffrey Thomas, Edward Morris, Gerald Hausman, Joe R. Lansdale, Billie Sue Mosiman and others.

In 2013 his second anthology, Dames, Booze, Guns & Gumshoes, was released, a collection of classic crime tales featuring David Goodis, Robert Leslie Bellem, Norman A. Daniels, and many others.

He also co-edited Shadows and Reflections: A tribute to Roger Zelazny with long-time friend Warren Lapine.

== Influences ==
Zelazny cited his biggest influences as follows:

- those from the pulp era—David Goodis, Cornell Woolrich, Jim Thompson
- Joe R. Lansdale, Stephen King, Robert Bloch, Dean Koontz, and Donald E. Westlake
- his father, Roger Zelazny
- several of the existentialists, most notably Søren Kierkegaard and Jean-Paul Sartre

He also commonly acknowledged Jane Lindskold as his greatest mentor.

== Bibliography ==
=== Novels ===
- Destination Unknown (iBooks, 2011)
- Too Late to Call Texas (Black Curtain Press, 2012)
- Voiceless (Evil Jester Press, 2014)

=== Novellas ===
- Fractal Despondency (Black Curtain Press, 2011)
- Shadowboxer (2011)
- To Sleep Gently (2011)
- A Crack in Melancholy Time (Crossroad Press, 2011)
- Butterfly Potion (Nightscape Press, 2012)
- People Person (Black Curtain Press, 2013)

=== Chapbooks ===
- Fractal Despondency (Black Curtain Press, 2011)
- Short of Breath (Cemetery Dance Publications, 2012)

=== Collections ===
- The Day the Leash Gave Way and Other Stories (2009)

=== Short fiction ===
- "Harold Asher and His Vomiting Dogs" in Scavenger's Newsletter edited by Janet Fox, 1999
- "Hope Is an Inanimate Desire" in 'Cemetery Sonata edited by June Hubbard, Chameleon Publishing 1999
- "Acupuncture" in Shadow of the Marquis (webzine) edited by Alex Severin, 2001
- "Chicken Strips" in Delirium Magazine edited by Shane Ryan Staley, 2001
- "Lunatic" in Shadow of the Marquis (webzine) edited by Alex Severin, 2001
- "The Disappearance of Experimentation" in Shadow of the Marquis (webzine) edited by Alex Severin 2001
- "A Dead Man's Burrito" in House of Pain, November/December issue, 2002
- "Caught in Etcetera" in Psrhea Magazine, February edited by David Kennedy, 2002
- "Competition" in House of Pain webzine, February/March issue edited by Wraith, 2002
- "Lovely Day for Beating an Old Guy" in RAW: Random Acts of Weirdness edited by Brian Knight, Catalyst Press 2002
- "On My Feet" in Deviant Minds, December issue edited by Rob Parnell, 2002
- "The End of the Rainbow" in The Swamp webzine, August issue edited by Pete Allen, 2002
- "The Music" in Horrorfind, February issue edited by Brian Keene, 2002
- "The Ten-in-One" in The Swamp June issue (webzine) edited by Pete Allen, 2002
- "Opportunity Knocks" in Penumbric Speculative Fiction edited by Jeff Georgeson, 2003
- "Mourning Road" in The Ethereal Gazette, 2005
- "The Day the Leash Gave Way" in Aphelion, May issue edited by Robert Moriyama, 2005
- "An Angle for the Angels" in The Ethereal Gazette, 2006
- "Divadavidavida" in Susurrus: The Literature of Madness, February issue edited by Brian Worley, 2006
- "Found Money" in Futures Mysterious Anthology Magazine, September/October issue, edited by Marlene Satter, 2006
- "Bathing Beauty" in The Day the Leash Gave Way and Other Stories, 2009
- "Hooch" in The Day the Leash Gave Way and Other Stories, 2009
- "Sparkle Head" in The Day the Leash Gave Way and Other Stories, 2009
- "The House of Happy Mayhem" in The Day the Leash Gave Way and Other Stories, 2009
- "Two-Thirty-Six" in The Day the Leash Gave Way and Other Stories, 2009
- "Nothingness Dust" in Kizuna: Fiction for Japan' edited by Brent Millis, 2011
- "Snow Blind" in Stupefying Stories, December issue edited by Bruce Bethke, 2011
- "The Digital Eidolon That Fits in Your Pocket" in Fantastic Stories of the Imagination' edited by Warren Lapine, 2012
- "Black Whispers" in World's Collider: A Shared-World Anthology edited by Richard Salter, 2012
- "Buckle Box" in The Original Van Goghs Ear Anthology edited by Tina Hall, September 9, 2012
- "Short of Breath: A Halloween Short Story" published by Cemetery Dance Publications, 2012
- "Slink" in Evil Jester Digest, Volume 2 edited by Peter Giglio, 2012
- "Windows in the Wreckage" in Evil Jester Digest, Volume 2 edited by Peter Giglio, 2012
- "Yesterday Man" (with Edward Morris) in Conjurings #1, June 2013
- "The Rag-End of Dreams" in Nightscapes: Vol. 1 edited by Mark C. Scioneaux, Robert S. Wilson and Jennifer Wilson, 2013
- "City Song" (with Edward Morris) in Dark Visions: A Collection of Modern Horror – Volume Two edited by Anthony Rivera and Sharon Lawson, 2013
- "Quarter, Quarter, How I Wonder" in Lucky 13: Thirteen Tales of Crime & Mayhem edited by Edward J. McFadden III, 2014
- "Parts Unknown" in The Big Click, Issue 19, edited by Jason Ridler, 2015
- "The Dead Letter Office" (with Brian Knight) in Borderlands Vol. 6 edited by Thomas F. Monteleone and Olivia Monteleone, 2016 (Bram Stoker Award winner, best anthology)
- "Young Hearts" in Guns, edited by Gerald Hausman, 2016

=== Anthologies (editor) ===
- Mirages: Tales from Authors of the Macabre (2012)
- Dames, Booze, Guns & Gumshoes (2013)
- Shadows & Reflections: A Roger Zelazny Tribute Anthology (with Warren Lapine) (2017)

=== Essays ===
- "Isle of Regret" in Amberzine edited by Erick Wujcik (2005)
- "How to Write a Short Story for Publication in the New Yorker, by Everette Sage Brown" in The Santa Fe Literary Review edited by Erin Pulsipher and Tom Stevens (2006)
- "Afterword" (The Dead Man's Brother) (2009)
- "Introduction" in Lovecraft eZine, Issue No. 18, Oct. 2012, edited by Mike Davis (2012)
- "Introduction" in Dames, Booze, Guns & Gumshoes (2013)
- "Introduction" in Lovecraft eZine, Issue No. 27, Oct. 2013, edited by Mike Davis (2013)
- "Horseman, Pass By" (Introduction) in Fantasy For Good – A Charitable Anthology, to benefit the Colon Cancer Alliance (2014)
- "Introduction" in Sha'Daa Inked, edited by Edward F. McKeown (2016)

=== Plays ===
- Not Any Little Girl (A One-Act Play) (2012)
- The Digital Eidolon That Fits in Your Pocket (A Very Short One-Act Play) (2012)

=== Plays (as producer) ===
- "Godson" written by Roger Zelazny, produced by Trent Zelazny, Laurel Zelazny, and George RR Martin, directed by Lenore Gallegos.
