= Gigi Garanzini =

Italian sports journalist

Gigi Garanzini (born 1948 in Biella) is an Italian sports journalist.

== Career ==
Garanzini began his writing career in 1974, on La Notte and later Corriere della Sera, La Stampa and, from 2007, Il Sole 24 Ore. During the FIFA World Cup 1990 he was the responsible of the Centro Stampa di Milano.

From 1999 Garanzini worked on Radio 24 on the program A tempo di sport and, from 2007, has had the blog, Slow Foot. On 29 June 2012 it was announced that Garanzini would present the program for the final time on Monday 2 July 2012.

== Books ==
- Il romanzo del vecio (introduction of Indro Montanelli, 1997)
- In Francia con l'Italia (with Carlo Petrini, 1998)
- Nereo Rocco. La leggenda del paròn (1999)
- E continuano a chiamarlo calcio (2007)
- Nereo Rocco. La leggenda del paròn continua (2009)
