= Gujarat Giants =

Gujarat Giants may refer:

- Gujarat Giants (WPL), a cricket team in the Women's Premier League based in Ahmedabad, Gujarat
- Gujarat Giants (PKL), a kabaddi team in the Pro Kabaddi League based in Ahmedabad, Gujarat
- Gujarat Giants (kho kho), a kho-kho team in the Ultimate Kho Kho League based in Ahmedabad, Gujarat
