= Peter Giglio =

- Born: March 25, 1972 (age 54)
- Occupations: novelist, editor, screenwriter
- Writing career
- Genres: Horror, Speculative Fiction

Peter Giglio (born March 25, 1972) is an American novelist, editor, and screenwriter.

== Biography ==
Giglio's first published piece of fiction, “The Better Half: A Love Story,” appeared in Werewolves and Shapeshifters: Encounters with the Beast Within (Black Dog & Leventhal), edited by John Skipp.

Giglio's first novel, Anon, was published in 2011 by Hydra Publications, the same house that published the book's sequel, Beyond Anon, in 2012. The Anon series focuses on institutional evil and existential explorations.

In 2012, under executive editor John Skipp, Giglio teamed up with Scott Bradley for the apocalyptic novel, The Dark, published by Ravenous Shadows. The book received advance praise from Mark Protosevich, screenwriter of The Cell and I Am Legend, Joe McKinney, Bram Stoker Award winning author of Flesh Eaters, Gerald Petievich, New York Times bestselling author of To Live and Die in L.A., and many others.

Giglio is the author of three novellas that subvert popular horror tropes: Balance (Museitup Publishing), A Spark in the Darkness (Etopia Press), and Sunfall Manor (Nightscape Press). A Spark in the Darkness was published in print in March 2012 as Cold Sparks: Two Chilling Novellas of Horror (Etopia Press), paired with Catherine Cavendish’s Cold Revenge, and Sunfall Manor, which made the 2012 preliminary ballot for the Bram Stoker Award (r) in long fiction. Balance was released in print by Evil Jester Press, with a new introduction by Eric Shapiro.

Giglio’s short stories have been selected for inclusion in several anthologies, including Psychos: Serial Killers, Depraved Madmen, and the Criminally Insane, edited by John Skipp; After Death..., edited by Eric J. Guignard; Mirages, edited by Trent Zelazny; and Nightscapes Volume 1, edited by Robert S. Wilson.

In 2011, Giglio edited the anthology, Help! Wanted: Tales of On-the-Job Terror, featuring Stephen Volk, Jeff Strand, and Joe McKinney. His second anthology, Evil Jester Digest Volume One, published in 2012, featured stories by Gary Brandner, Rick Hautala, and David Dunwoody. He is also the editor of Evil Jester Digest Volume Two, featuring Tim Waggoner and Gene O'Neill.

Giglio has film options on two literary properties: Joe R. Lansdale’s “The Night They Missed the Horror Show” (for which he has penned a screenplay with Scott Bradley) and Rick Hautala’s Little Brothers.

Giglio is currently signed to a three novel deal with DarkFuse.

== Credits ==
=== Novels & Novellas ===
- Anon (Hydra Publications) - June 2011
- The Dark (with Scott Bradley) (Ravenous Shadows) - October 2012
- Beyond Anon (Hydra Publications) - June 2012
- Balance (Museitup Publishing) - March 2012
- A Spark in the Darkness (Etopia Press)- September 2011
- Cold Sparks: Two Chilling Novellas of Horror (Etopia Press) March 2012
- Sunfall Manor (Nightscape Press) October 2012
- Stealing Night (Nightscape Press) April 2013
- Lesser Creatures (DarkFuse) December 2013
- When We Fall (DarkFuse) - April 2014
- Shadowshift (DarkFuse) June 2015

=== Anthologies (as editor) ===
- Help! Wanted: Tales of On-the-Job Terror (Evil Jester Press)
- Evil Jester Digest Volume One (Evil Jester Press)
- Evil Jester Digest Volume Two (Evil Jester Press)

=== Novels (as editor) ===
- The Quarry by Mark Allan Gunnells
- Seraphim by Jon Michael Kelley
- Inheritance by Joe McKinney
- The Summer of Winters by Mark Allan Gunnells

=== Screenplays ===
- “The Night They Missed the Horror Show” (with Scott Bradley), based on the short story by Joe R. Lansdale

=== Short stories ===
- “The Better Half: A Love Story” (with Scott Bradley)
- “Sisters, Arizona”
- “302”
- “Tracking the Scent”
- “The Power of Words”
- “Reaching for the Light”
- “Angela & the Angel” (with Scott Bradley)
- “Trust”
- “Straycation” (with Scott Bradley)
- "Spiderdream"
- "Cages"
- "Game Changer"
- "Evergreen"
- "On the Road to Devil's Gulch"
- "No Limit" (with Shannon Giglio)
- "Change" (with Shannon Giglio)
