= Carol Gigliotti =

American author

External audio
- Episode 63: Critical Animal Studies with Carol Gigliotti; Gigliotti discusses critical animal studies with Siobhan O'Sullivan on the podcast Knowing Animals
- Episode 211: Animal Creativity with Carol Gigliotti; Gigliotti discusses animal creativity with Josh Milburn on the podcast Knowing Animals

Carol Gigliotti is an academic, writer, artist, and animal activist. She is Professor Emeritus of Design and Dynamic Media, Emily Carr University of Art and Design in Vancouver, British Columbia. She is the editor of the 2009 book Leonardo's Choice: Genetic Technologies and Animals, published by Springer, and the author of the 2022 book The Creative Lives of Animals, published by New York University Press. The Creative Lives of Animals won a gold award in the Animals & Nature category in the 2023 Nautilus Book Awards.

Gigliotti studied at Northwestern University, Southern Illinois University Carbondale, and Ohio State University. She completed her PhD at Ohio State in 1993. Her thesis, which was supervised by Robert Lloyd Arnold, was entitled Aesthetics of a virtual world: ethical issues in interactive technological design. She worked at Ohio State until 1999, taking up a position at Emily Carr in 2000. In 2023, she was the keynote speaker at the Australasian Animal Studies Association (AASA) conference with her presentation Why knowledge of animal cultures is critical.

== Selected publications ==
- Leonardo's Choice: Genetic Technologies and Animals, 2009 (editor)
- The Creative Lives of Animals, 2022
