= Giglio (company) =

Italian fashion brand

- Industry: Fashion and clothing
- Founded: 1996
- Headquarters: Palermo, Italy
- Products: Luxury fashion products and accessories
- Revenue: 37,923,155 euro (2021)
- Number of employees: 92 (2021)
- Website: giglio.com

Giglio is fashion brand that sells online and in stores located in Palermo, Italy. The company has its origins in the 1960s, operating 80 multi-brand stores and ecommerce through Giglio.com. Giglio sells luxury and fashion products and accessories with the majority of sales occurring through its website.

== History ==
Giglio was founded by Michele Giglio in the 1960s. Michele began the business as a small fabric shop with knowledge learned from the family textile and haberdashery shop. He turned the fabric shop into a fashion store, and became a Ltd by the 1970s. He began to move the designs into exhibition spaces. It grew into several retail locations in Palermo, Italy, and began selling online through Giglio.com in 2007.

Giglio has become a name in the fashion sector of Sicily. As of 2019, it operates as a joint stock company. Equilybra invested in Giglio in 2019, taking a minority stake in the company. It has also been ranked in the FT1000 as one of Europe's fastest growing companies.
