= G2 Esports =

European esports organisation

- Short name: G2
- Divisions: Counter-Strike 2; EVA; Fortnite; iRacing; Hearthstone; League of Legends; Rainbow Six Siege; Rocket League; Valorant; Call of Duty (as G2 Minnesota); Kings League (as G2 Football Club)
- Founded: 24 February 2014; 12 years ago
- Team history: Gamers2 (2014–2015); G2 Esports (2015–present)
- Location: Berlin, Germany
- Owner: Jens Hilgers
- Partners: Logitech, Red Bull, AOC, Philips, Pringles, Mastercard, Lenovo, Ralph Lauren, Metaplex, Spotify, Herman Miller, Next Level Racing
- Website: www.g2esports.com

G2 Esports (or simply G2) is a European esports organization headquartered in Berlin, Germany, with players competing in League of Legends, Valorant, Counter-Strike 2, Hearthstone, Rocket League, Rainbow Six Siege, Fortnite, iRacing and EVA. G2 also operate G2 Minnesota in the Call of Duty League and G2 Football Club in Kings League Germany. The organization was founded in Spain on 24 February 2014 as Gamers2 by former League of Legends pro Carlos "ocelote" Rodríguez Santiago and investor Jens Hilgers. The organization rebranded as G2 Esports on 15 October 2015.

G2's League of Legends team competes in the League of Legends EMEA Championship (LEC), the highest level of competitive League of Legends in Europe. The team has won twenty domestic titles in Europe, the most of any organization, and became the only Western team to win the Mid-Season Invitational in 2019. The organization's Rainbow Six Siege team competes in the European League (EUL), the highest level of competitive Rainbow Six Siege in Europe. The team won two World Championships, becoming the first team to do so. First in 2019 by defeating Team Empire at the Six Invitational 2019 final, and second at the Six Invitational 2023 following a lower bracket run to the final. The CS:GO team holds the second longest LAN map winning streak at 22 as well as being one of three teams that has won Intel Extreme Masters (IEM) Katowice and Cologne in the same year.

G2 are also members of the Esports Foundation Club Partner Program, funded by Saudi Arabia's Public Investment Fund, which gives teams monetary rewards for painting the Esports World Cup tournament series in a positive light and driving engagement to the tournament, which is seen to some as a sportswashing tool that Saudi Arabia is using to distract the public from their poor human rights record.

== Organization ==
Carlos Rodríguez resigned as CEO of G2 on 23 September 2022, amidst controversy surrounding his acquaintanceship with Andrew Tate. He had previously been suspended from his position after a clip of him partying with Andrew and his brother Tristan Tate went viral. Commentators later suspected this incident to be the reason for G2 being denied a franchise spot in the 2023 season of the Valorant Champions Tour. Carlos Rodriguez was later suspended from Riot-sanctioned competition until 13 November 2022, having to follow a sensitivity and executive training to be allowed back to the LEC.

== Current divisions ==
=== League of Legends ===
G2 Esports
- Game: League of Legends
- League: LEC
- Head coach: Luka "Perkz" Perković
- Championships: 1× MSI (2019) 20× LEC: 2016 Spring; 2016 Summer; 2017 Spring; 2017 Summer; 2019 Spring; 2019 Summer; 2020 Spring; 2020 Summer; 2022 Spring; 2023 Winter; 2023 Summer; 2023 Season Finals; 2024 Winter; 2024 Spring; 2024 Summer; 2024 Season Finals; 2025 Summer; 2026 Versus; 2026 Spring; 2026 Summer

==== History ====
Gamers2 had made a start for League of Legends in 2014 with an initial roster of Top laner Jesper "Jwaow" Strandgren, jungler Sebastián "Morden" Esteban Fernández, Mid laner Carlos "Ocelote" Rodríguez, AD carry Soler "Yuuki60" Florent, and support Hugo "Dioud" Padioleau.

The team participated in the Spring Expansion Tournament, beating Reason Gaming in the seeding game and Team Strix in Round 1. G2 were knocked out of the tournament in Round 2 after being beaten by n!faculty.

G2 Esports was renamed from Gamers2 after qualifying for the 2016 EU LCS Spring Season.

G2 Esports has also a sister team in Spain competing in the EU Challenger Series, called G2 Vodafone, in representation of their sponsor Vodafone. They qualified for the 2016 EU Challenger Series Summer Split Qualifiers, but failed to qualify for the EU CS. They also won the Spanish 2016 Final Cup Spring Split.

The team failed to qualify for the LCS three splits in a row.

The team finished 1st in the Challenger Series season. They then took 2nd in the playoffs, thereby qualifying for the 2016 Spring EU LCS. Gamers2 qualified for the LCS by defeating SK Gaming 3–2.

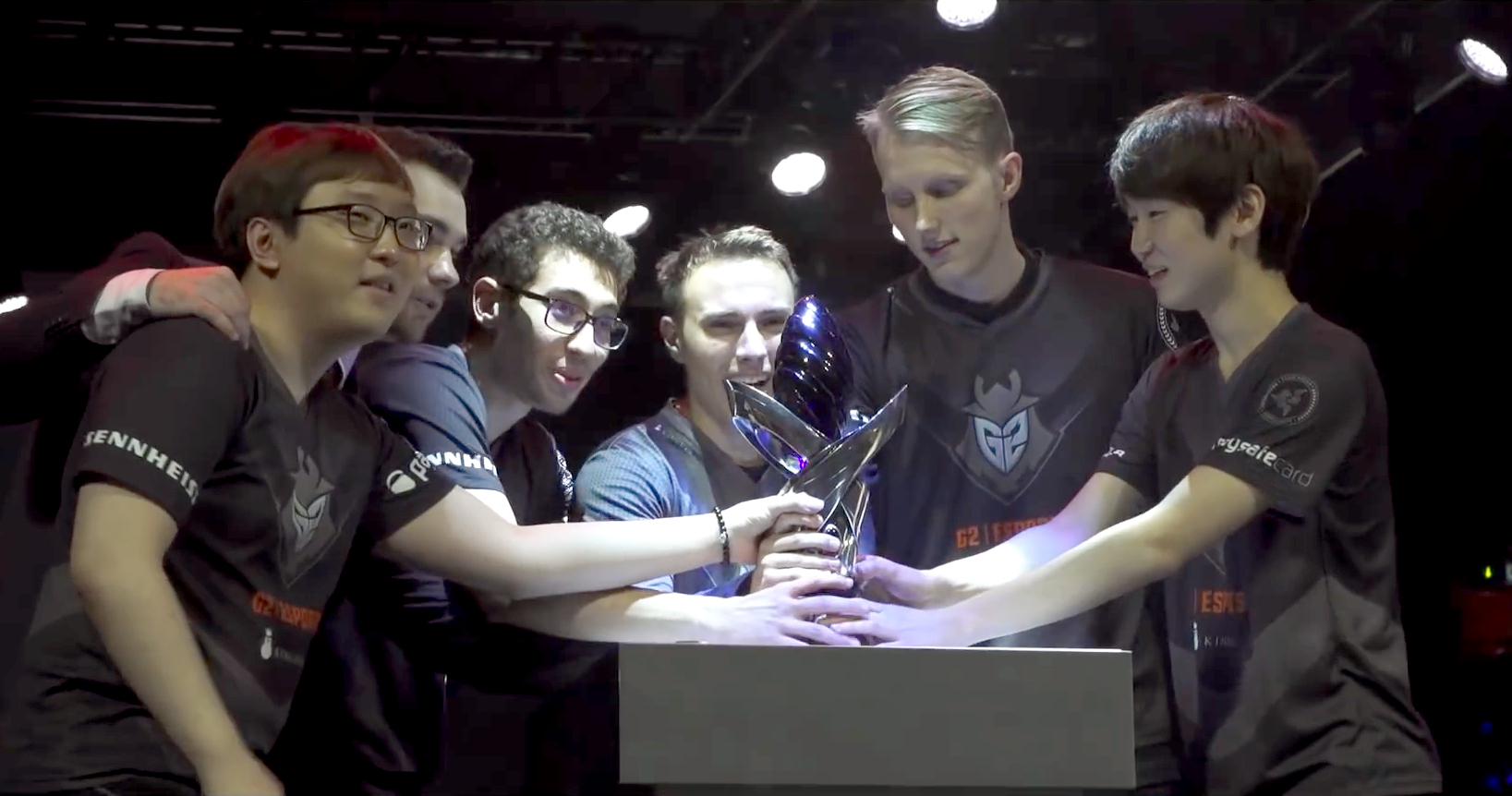
G2 holding the 2016 EU LCS Summer trophy

G2 finished the 2016 EU LCS Spring Split regular season in 1st place. In the playoffs, they defeated Fnatic before winning the 2016 EU LCS in Rotterdam after beating Origen. This also meant that they had qualified for the 2016 Mid-Season Invitational tournament in Shanghai. G2 would represent Europe at the competition against 5 other teams. However, in the weeks before the tournament, the team took an infamous vacation and came to the tournament unprepared. Because of this, they lost 8 of their 10 games, their only two wins against the lowest ranked seed there. This also cost the EU LCS league its 1st seed for the 2016 World Championship later that year. This meant that the 1st seed for Europe of the 2016 Summer EU LCS would be at a disadvantage in the tournament.

G2 performed well in 2018 and got much further at the 2018 League of Legends World Championship than expected for a team considered an underdog, making it all the way to the Semifinals match. G2 lost to eventual world champion Invictus Gaming in the semis. Something the G2 team of 2018 was known for was unconventional picks in the bot lane; their AD carry Hjarnan was a rare Heimerdinger player.

G2 retooled their team for the 2019 season, releasing their bottom lane duo of Hjarnan and Wadid, and signing Mikyx as a new support and acquiring Caps as their new midlaner from their regional rival Fnatic. Since the team now had two midlaners, Perkz was sent to the bottom lane to role swap to AD carry. G2 became the first team to be crowned LEC champions after they won its inaugural split post name change from EU LCS on 14 April 2019, in a 3–0 sweep against Origen.

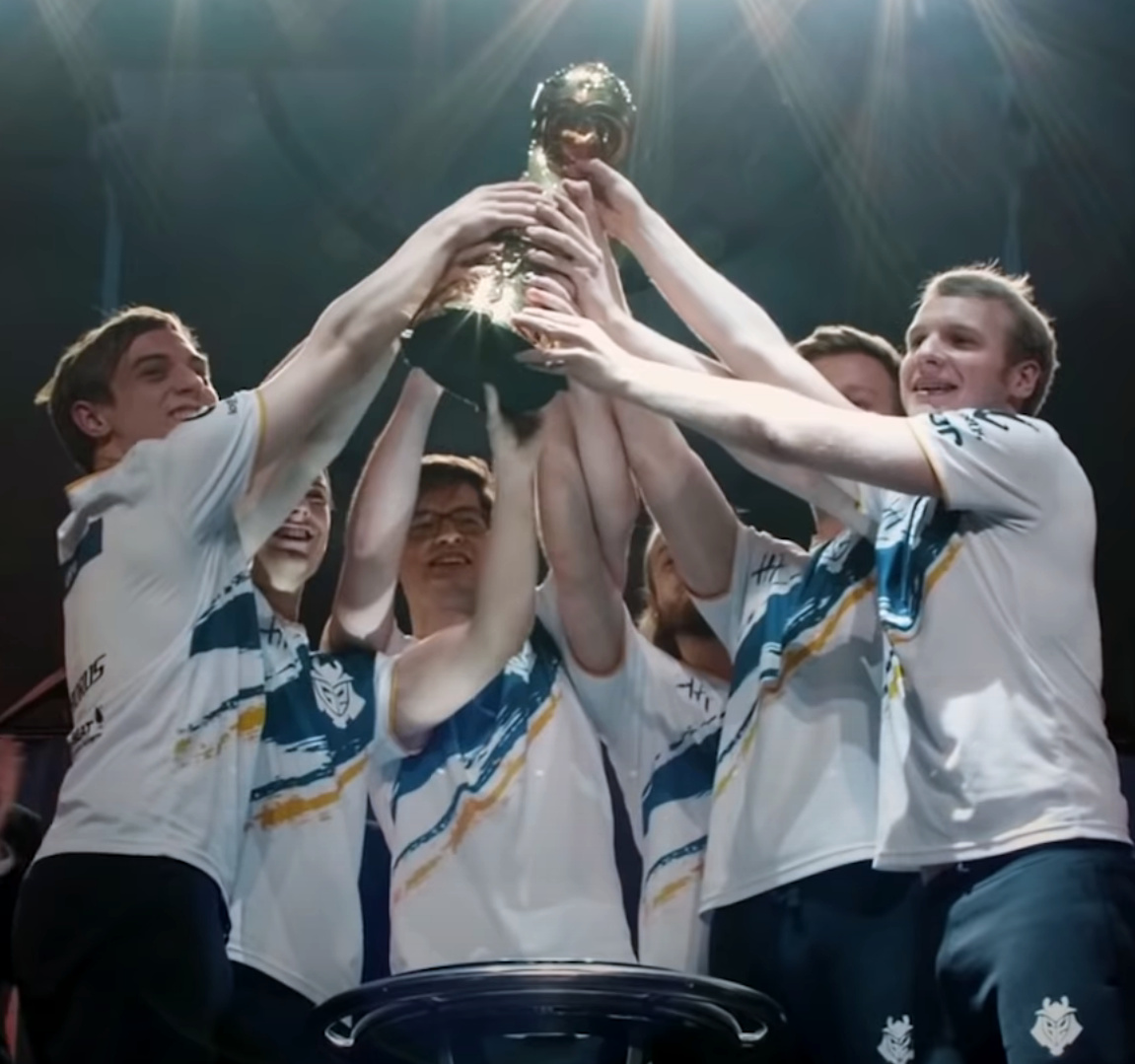
G2 holding the 2019 MSI trophy

After sweeping Team Liquid from North America 3–0 in the grand final of the 2019 Mid-Season Invitational, G2 became the first European team to win a Riot-sponsored international tournament since Fnatic won the Season 1 World Championship. They finished first in the 2019 LEC Summer Split regular season and later defeated Fnatic 3–2 in the finals to secure their sixth domestic title.

At the 2019 League of Legends World Championship, G2 finished runner-up, losing to Chinese team FunPlus Phoenix in the grand finals.

In the 2020 LEC Spring Split, Perkz and Caps role-swapped for the split after Perkz expressed a desire to play mid lane again. G2 came first in the regular season, but lost their first playoff match against MAD Lions, resulting in a drop to the loser's bracket. From there, the team won the three remaining matches and ultimately won the split, claiming their seventh title and tying the record belonging to Fnatic. In Summer, G2 made it to the LEC playoffs; they lost to Fnatic 3–2 in the winner's bracket finals, but defeated Rogue in the loser's bracket finals and then defeated Fnatic in the Grand Finals rematch 3–0 to win the split. At the 2020 League of Legends World Championship, G2 made it to the semifinals, but were eliminated by eventual champion Damwon Gaming and finished in 3rd/4th place.

G2 revamped its roster for the 2021 LEC season, notably with trading longtime team captain Perkz to Cloud9 and acquiring Martin "Rekkles" Larson from Fnatic. While G2 finished at the top of the standings after the regular season of the 2021 Spring Split with a 14–4 record, they failed to win in the playoffs, first losing to MAD Lions, and then being eliminated by Rogue in the lower bracket. The team finished in second place in the regular season of the 2021 Summer Split, but lost to MAD Lions in the playoffs once again and were sent to the loser's bracket. There, they faced Rekkles's old team and long-time LEC rival Fnatic, and were defeated, eliminated G2 from contention. As a result, G2 failed to earn one of the LEC's three slots at Worlds, and 2021 marked the first year G2 failed to qualify for Worlds since joining the EU LCS in 2016.

For the 2022 LEC season, G2 released Grabbz, Rekkles, Wunder, and Mikyx. Dylan Falco and BrokenBlade were acquired from the disbanding Schalke 04 Esports as the new head coach and top laner. Flakked and Targamas were acquired and promoted from non-LEC European leagues for the bottom lane. G2 finished fourth place in the Spring Split regular season with an 11–7 record and lost to Fnatic in their initial upper bracket playoff match. However, they went on to win out in the lower bracket, defeating Vitality, Misfits, Fnatic (in a rematch), and Rogue in 3–0 matches. This qualified them as the LEC representative at the 2022 Mid-Season Invitational. There, G2 initially performed strongly, sweeping ORDER and Evil Geniuses in the group stage, and getting a strong 4–0 start in the "rumble" stage. Including the LEC playoffs, G2 had gone on a 24-game winning streak. The streak was broken with a loss to PSG Talon, however, and G2 finished the rumble stage 5–5. Their record qualified them for the semifinals, but G2 was defeated by the LCK representative T1 in a decisive 3–0 sweep. Following the elimination from the World Championship, Jankos revealed to be parting ways with the G2 Esports organization, ending a 5-year partnership with the team.

On 1 September 2022.G2 announced a full female League of Legends teams called G2 Hel.

G2 revamped its roster again for the 2023 LEC season, G2 signed Yike from LDLC OL and Hans Sama from Team Liquid. Mikyx also returned to G2 from Excel Esports. The team took the tournament from 4th place in the regular season, after which they confidently closed the group stage with a score of 2–0 in Group B. G2 Esports won the 2023 LEC Season Finals with a 3–1 victory over Fnatic, marking their second domestic title of the year after their LEC Winter win. As a result, G2 Esports would represent the EMEA region as the first seed at the 2023 League of Legends World Championship. At worlds G2 started off strong with wins against Dplus KIA and Weibo going 2–0 and requiring one more win to play-offs. However G2 would end up losing against Gen.G, NRG Esports and would then be eliminated by Bilibili Gaming. Despite the loss G2 announced that they wouldn't make any roster changes for the 2024 LEC Season.

For 2024 season, G2 won both Spring and Summer, because of this they represented LEC as the first seed at the 2024 Mid-Season Invitational. There they would lose to T1 in a 5-game series and be sent to the lower bracket.G2 would pick up 3–0 wins against PCSs PSG Talon and LPLs Top Esports before getting 3-0'd by T1 in a rematch to finish 4th place. G2 would go on to win the remaining LEC events, Summer and Finals, to complete the first LEC Grand Slam in the new LEC format.Of course with the Season Finals win, G2 represented LEC at 2024 League of Legends World Championship as their first seed. However at Worlds, G2 would finish 2–3 in Swiss Stage being knocked out again by Bilibili Gaming.

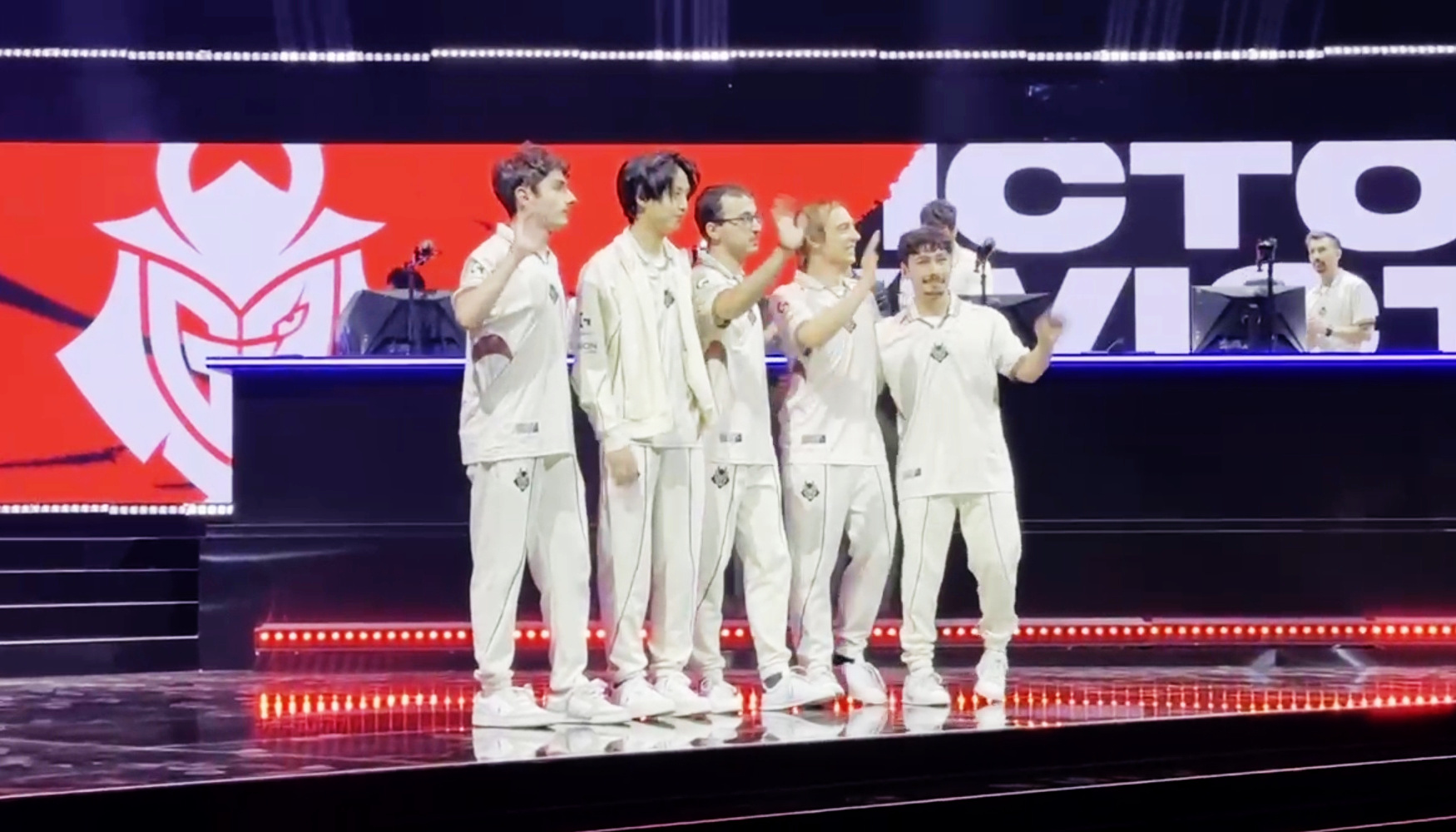
G2 after defeating Furia at the 2025 Mid-Season Invitational

For the 2025 season, G2 released both Mikyx and Yike. Soon after G2 announced the additions of Rudy "Skewmond" Semaan from Team BDS Academy and Labros "Labrov" Papoutsakis from BDSs LEC Roster as Jungler and Support respectively.

==== Current roster ====
G2 Esports League of Legends roster
Players
Coaches

Role	Handle	Name	Nationality
Top	BrokenBlade	Çelik, Sergen	Germany
Jungle	SkewMond	Semaan, Rudy	France
Mid	Caps	Winther, Rasmus	Denmark
Bot	Hans Sama	Liv, Steven	France
Support	Labrov	Papoutsakis, Labros	Greece

Head coach

Luka "Perkz" Perković

Assistant coach(es)

Jonas "Memento" Elmarghichi

Legend:
- (I) Inactive
- (S) Suspended
- Substitute
- (injured) Injury / Illness

Latest roster transaction: 25 July 2026.

=== Counter-Strike ===
==== History ====
===== CS:GO =====
G2 Esports acquired the roster of Team Kinguin on 11 September 2015. G2 finished 3rd–4th at DreamHack Open Cluj-Napoca 2015.

On 20 January 2016, G2 Esports announced that FaZe Clan had acquired their international Counter-Strike roster. G2 announced a new French-speaking roster on 1 February 2016 which consisted of Titan's former roster. On 9 April, shortly after placing 9–12th at the MLG Major Championship: Columbus, G2 announced Alexandre "bodyy" Pianaro would be replacing Kévin "Ex6TenZ" Droolans. G2 placed 2nd at the ESL Pro League Season 3 Finals on 16 May 2016 after losing 2–3 to Luminosity Gaming in the grand finals. G2 Esports won the Esports Championship Series Season 1 after beating Luminosity in the finals on 26 June 2016.

With effect from 3 February 2017, 3 players from Team EnVyUs joined G2 Esports. Kenny "kennyS" Schrub, Dan "apEX" Madesclaire and Nathan "NBK" Schmitt thus forming the "French Super Team". The players they replaced were Adil "ScreaM" Benrlitom, who joined Team EnVyUs, Cédric "RpK" Guipouy, who also joined Team EnVyUs and Edouard "SmithZz" Dubourdeaux who became the head coach of G2 Esports.

On 4 June 2018, Edouard "SmithZz" Dubourdeaux and Kevin "Ex6TenZ" Droolans replaced apEX and NBK- in the lineup. The latter two would go on to be acquired by Team Vitality on 8 October 2018.

In November 2018, Audric "JaCkz" Jug and Lucas "Lucky" Chastang joined G2 while SmithZz and Ex6TenZ moved to the bench.

On 8 March 2019, François "AmaNEk" Delaunay joined G2 replacing bodyy in the active lineup.

On 30 September 2019, G2 acquired Nemanja "nexa" Isaković and Nemanja "huNter-" Kovač from CR4ZY replacing Lucky and Richard "shox" Papillon in the lineup.

On 28 October 2020, G2 signed Nikola "NiKo" Kovac from FaZe Clan for an undisclosed fee. This move reunited NiKo with his cousin, huNter. G2 later released JaCkz, stating they did not want to pursue a six-man roster.

On 5 March 2021, G2 benched kennyS, and brought back JaCkz into the active roster following a series of underwhelming results.

On 7 November 2021, G2 made their first appearance as Major finalists at the PGL Major Stockholm 2021, where G2 would finish second place to Natus Vincere.

Following a dominant Natus Vincere during the latter half of 2021, many tier 1 teams adjusted their rosters for 2022. On 3 January 2022, G2 acquired 16-year old prodigy AWPer Ilya "m0NESY" Osipov from Natus Vincere Junior.

On 23 January 2022, G2 announced their completed new roster. Long-time IGL nexa was swapped for Finnish IGL Aleksi "Aleksib" Virolainen from OG Esports. AmaNEK was benched and m0NESY replaced him as their primary AWPer. Former Team Vitality coach Rémy "XTQZZZ" Quoniam joined as their head coach.

Following a lackluster performance, longtime member JaCkz left G2 on 10 August.

G2 revamped their roster again on 16 August. G2 signed Australian player Justin "jks" Savage from Complexity Gaming. Aleksib was benched and in his place Danish IGL Rasmus "HooXi" Nielsen was signed from Copenhagen Flames.

Aleksib was signed by Ninjas in Pyjamas on 8 September.

For the first time since signing a team all the way back in 2015, G2 failed to make a major going 1–3 and being eliminated from the RMR by Gamerlegion

G2 announced the departure of XQTZZZ as he decided to step down; it was also announced that their analyst Swani would step in as interim coach.

G2 also announced that after 6 years they parted ways with their team manager Niak on 1 November. It was also announced on the same day that Serbian manager Petar "peca" Marković would take the role of team manager.

G2 announced on 15 November that KennyS has departed the roster after 6 years with the organization. This marked the first time since 2016 that the CS:GO division did not have a French member.

On 18 December 2022, G2 won the Blast Premier World Final 2022 with a 2–0 win over Team Liquid exactly 1092 days after winning their last LAN map in a Grand Finals, and more than 5 years since their last Tier 1 event win, DreamHack Masters Malmö, on 3 September 2017. m0NESY was crowned the HLTV.org MVP for the event.

In an interview with HLTV on 20 January, huNter confirmed that Swani will stay as the team's permanent coach.

G2 began the 2023 season in superlative form, besting Natus Vincere and BIG in dominant fashion in the Blast Premier Spring Groups and qualified for the Blast Premier Spring Finals. G2 continued their strong run of form into IEM Katowice 2023, where they dispatched of NaVi, FaZe, and BIG without dropping a single map to proceed straight to semi finals. Once in the semi-finals, G2 swept aside Team Liquid 2–0 en route to the grand finals where they encountered an also in-form Heroic. G2 began the series by winning Mirage and Nuke 16–13 and 16–12, respectively, which pushed the series into a 2–0 and extended their LAN map winning streak to 22, the second longest in the history of CS:GO. This streak was unfortunately broken by Heroic during the 3rd map Inferno. G2 eventually defeated Heroic 3–1 after comfortably winning Heroic's 2nd map pick Ancient 16–7, crowning themselves as the IEM Katowice 2023 champions, with huNter- being named the HLTV.org MVP and jks becoming DHL MVP. It was also NiKo's first time winning IEM Katowice ever, having previously fallen short in 2 consecutive Grand Finals with FaZe Clan and one with G2.

On 7 March 2023, G2 announced an all-female line-up named G2 Oya consisting of Ex-G2 Gozen players zAAz and juliano

G2 qualified for Blast.tv Paris Major 2023 as Challengers with a 3–1 record in the RMR. At the major they went 3–0 in the Challenger Stage and qualified for the Legends Stage. In the Legends Stage, G2 lost against Vitality and Bad News Eagles on the first day, relegating them to the elimination bracket. They managed to secure a win against Furia Esports, however, G2 could not continue to survive in the elimination bracket as they suffered a shocking defeat in the 1–2 bracket match against Fnatic, only managing to scrap together a win on Inferno and suffering defeats on Ancient and Vertigo. This resulted in G2 exiting the Paris Major with a 1–3 record in the Legends Stage.

Despite many roster changes happening in the off-season, G2 announced that they wouldn't be making any changes to their roster.

Due to their first place finish at IEM Katowice 2023, G2 qualified for IEM Cologne 2023 where they achieved victories over Astralis, FaZe and Vitality, earning them a semi-final spot. There, G2 beat Astralis once more in a 2–0 finish. In the finals, G2 won 3–1 against ENCE, winning Nuke, Mirage and Ancient. With this win, G2 became the third and final team in CS:GO to win both IEM Katowice and Cologne in the same year, the others being Fnatic and FaZe. NiKo was awarded the HLTV and DHL MVP.

===== CS2 =====
On 9 November 2023, G2 reportedly benched jks. He was replaced on 21 November with the return of nexa.

On 4 December, Swani announced his decision to step down as head coach of G2 after Blast World Finals 2023. Two days before the event, on 11 December, G2 announced that ex-Virtus.pro player and Major winner Wiktor "TaZ" Wojtas had joined the team as their head coach.

G2 announced the release of its Oya roster on 19 December 2023.

G2 won IEM Dallas on 2 June 2024, with Jake "Stewie2k" Yip standing in for HooXi. Despite the win, G2 benched Nexa on 17 June and replaced him with Guatemalan star Mario "malbsMd" Samayoa from M80 on 28 June.

After two eventful years, Hooxi was moved over to the inactive roster on 1 July. Two days later, Nexa was released and G2 announced the addition of ex-Virtus.pro player Janusz "Snax" Pogorzelski.

On 3 January 2025, Nikola "NiKo" Kovac departed the team in an expected move to Falcons Esports, and on 11 January 2025, G2 unveiled Nikita "HeavyGod" Martynenko as part of the main roster

On July 18, 2025, G2 acquired Alvaro "SunPayus" García as their AWPer and Eetu "sAw" Saha as coach, both from Heroic. The organization also signed Matúš "matys" Šimko from Fnatic.

In November 2026, G2 defeated world number one MOUZ 2–1 at BLAST Rivals Hong Kong, ending a six-series losing streak. G2 entered the match as pre-match underdogs.

==== Championships ====
- DreamHack Open Tours 2017
- ESL Pro League Season 5
- Esports Championship Series Season 1
- DreamHack Masters Malmö 2017
- Champions Cup 2019
- Blast Premier World Final 2022
- IEM Katowice 2023
- IEM Cologne 2023
- IEM Dallas 2024
- Blast Premier Fall Final 2024
- Blast Premier World Final 2024
- Blast Premier Open London 2025

==== Current roster ====
G2 Esports Counter-Strike 2 roster
Players
Coaches

Handle	Name	Nationality
huNter-	Kovač, Nemanja	Bosnia and Herzegovina
HeavyGod	Martynenko, Nikita	Israel
MATYS	Šimko, Matúš	Slovakia
NertZ	Iluz, Guy	Israel
r1nkle	Moroz, Artem	Ukraine
SunPayus (I)	García, Álvaro	Spain

Head coach

Eetu "sAw" Saha

Legend:
- (I) Inactive
- (S) Suspended
- Substitute
- (injured) Injury / Illness

Latest roster transaction: 25 June 2026.

=== Rainbow Six Siege ===
==== History ====
The announcement that G2 Esports acquired the full roster of PENTA Sports, all five players and two coaches came a few days before the kick-off of the Six Major Paris group stage. These players, winners of the Six Invitational 2018 and multiple Pro League champions, represented the colors of G2 from 10 August 2018. Niclas "Pengu" Mouritzen was considered the most experienced player in both the team and the wider Rainbow Six Siege scene, having been in the Year 1 Season 1 PENTA roster. Fabian "Fabian" Hällsten was the in-game leader of the team to whom the strategic success and flexibility of the team was often pointed towards, as one of the best IGLs in the European Pro League. Daniel "Goga" Mazorra Romero was the only non-Nordic player on the team, and the only Spanish player in the whole of Pro League at the time. He was often praised for his ability on the games hard breachers, particularly Thermite. JNSzki was one of the 2 Finnish players on the team, being acquired from PENTA's Year 1 rival of GiFu, he has been reputed throughout the Pro League's history as one of the best aimers and Bandit players in all of Siege.

The team quickly proved to be a beneficial pick-up by G2, winning the Six Major Paris and its $350,000 prize pool immediately following the purchase by defeating their rivals Evil Geniuses 3–0.

The team won the Six Invitational 2019 on 17 February 2019 by defeating Team Empire 3–0.

jNSzki was released by G2 Esports on 27 May 2019, replaced by UUNO from LeStream (Now KOI). Juhani "Kantoraketti" Toivonen was originally a loan to PENTA from ENCE for the LAN finals of Season 7 Pro League. Following the departure of Ville "SHA77E" Palola, Kantoraketti officially became the 5th member of PENTA, that would go on to be G2 Esports. UUNO had played for the PENTA Academy being coached by G2's own coach, Thomas "Shas[O]Uas" Lee. Shas is one of the longest working coaches in Siege, originally coaching for Team Fenix, a team which had also featured Fabian and previous roster teammate of Niklas "KS" Massierer, and is still the head coach for the team. Kevin "Sua" Stahnke was the secondary coach and analyst of the roster, brought in to replace Daniel "Ferral" Rotheram, G2's original analyst.

After signing Aleksi "UUNO" Työppönen and Joonas "jNSzki" Savolainen retired, G2 lost the Six Major Raleigh on 18 August 2019 after losing 3–1 to Russian rivals, Team Empire.

On 22 November 2019, Goga was replaced by the German player of Pascal "Cry1NNN" Alouane. Right before Six Invitational 2020 Cry1NNN was benched and was replaced by Ferenc "SirBoss" Mérész on loan from PENTA. After the event, SirBoss left G2.

On 3 March 2020, G2 Esports announced their new "superteam", picking up Ben "CTZN" McMillan from Natus Vincere and Jake "Virtue" Grannan from Fnatic while benching long time player Fabian in the process, who would eventually leave officially on 6 June 2020.

At the start of March 2021, Pengu announced his retirement at the age of 23. After few days, G2 Esports announced the addition of Jordan "Kayak" Morley into the roster.

After underwhelming performances at the Six Invitational 2021, finishing 8th in Group A during the Group Stage and being eliminated in the first round of the lower bracket, the organization decided to revamp their roster. On 10 June 2021, it was announced that both remaining Finnish players Kantoraketti and UUNO were benched. On the same day, G2 introduced two new players: Lucas "Hungry" Reich, coming back from a break from the competitive scene, and Jonas "Jonka" Kaczmarzyk from MnM Gaming.

This roster wouldn't qualify for the Six Invitational 2022. Because of this Hungry and Jonka would be moved to the inactive position shortly before leaving. G2 introduced three new players this time: Karl "Alem4o" Zarth, Kevin "Prano" Pranowitz and Jack "Doki" Robertson while Kayak left for Na'vi. Only after 6 months joining, Prano moves to the inactive position, Byron "Blurr" Murray is acquired after leaving Na'vi and Fabian rejoins the roster. CTZN leaves and is replaced by Benjamin "Benjamaster" Dereli from Heroic.

This time the org managed to qualify for the Six Invitational 2023.There they would finish 2nd in Group A before losing 2–0 to Wolves Esports in the first round of play-offs.After this G2 went on a tear through the lower bracket, winning every single match starting with Faze Clan, then Dark Zero, M80, a rematch against Wolves, Astralis and Oxygen to set up a final against w7m esports who were the tournaments favorites.G2 would go on to win 3–1 to become the first organization to win multiple Six Invitationals.

Following a 5th–8th finish at the BLAST R6 Major Copenhagen 2023.Blurr is benched and shortly after leaves, while Luigi "Gemini" Ferrigno from Misfits is acquired. Fabian leaves G2's coaching position on 18 August to join PSG Talon in Korea.

Meanwhile UUNO returns to G2 after a year who replaces Gemini and Matheus "Ramalho" Gonçalves from FaZe Clan joins as coach.

On June 6, 2025, after a series of terrible performance from G2 in Rio RE:L0:AD 2025, UUNO was benched from G2 and the American Streamer/Content Creator Zack "Stompn" Lamb, who is famous for carrying Twitch streamer Jynxzi, will be brought into the G2 roster to replace UUNO.

On June 16, 2025, Stompn had his Tier 1 debut with G2 against Wolves in the 2025 R6 Europe MENA League. Despite flex player Alem4o going 1–8, Loira carried his team to victory by dropping 16 kills with only 7 deaths and brought his team to victory. Stompn was 7–6 in that match but he did his job and G2 are looking way better than before.

==== Current roster ====
G2 Esports Rainbow Six Siege roster
Players
Coaches

Handle	Name	Nationality
Benjamaster	Dereli, Benjamin	Denmark
Shaiiko	Lebleu, Stéphane	France
Alem4o	Zarth, Karl	Brazil
Doki	Robertson, Jack	United Kingdom
Stompn	Lamb, Zack	United States

Head coach

- Matheus "Ramalho" Gonçalves

Assistant coach(es)

- Gabriel “Cameram4n” Hespanhol

Legend:
- (I) Inactive
- (S) Suspended
- Substitute
- (injured) Injury / Illness

Latest roster transaction: 27 June 2023.

=== Valorant ===
G2 Esports first entered the Valorant scene by signing former CS:GO player Oscar "mixwell" Cañellas Colocho as the team's captain on 16 June 2020. The following week saw Patryk "paTiTek" Fabrowski and Jacob "pyth" Mourujärvi also join the roster on 24 and 26 June 2020 respectively. Following the addition of a fourth player in Ardis "ardiis" Svarenieks on 3 July 2020, the G2 VALORANT team would then sign David "Davidp" Prins, who had been standing in for the first two successful event runs, on 31 July 2020 before going on to win a further four tournaments.

First Strike Europe saw G2 fall in the semi-finals to eventual champions Team Heretics which led to the benching of Davidp and the arrival of Aleksander "zeek" Zygmunt. The first half of 2021 was a contrast to the early domination and further struggles for the team saw them part ways with zeek, ardiis and paTiTek. These departures saw Žygimantas "nukkye" Chmieliauskas, Auni "AvovA" Chahade and Jose Luis "koldamenta" Aranguren Herrero added to the roster in their place. Three weeks later, a new fifth, Cista "keloqz" Wassim, was announced on 25 June 2021 following pyth's decision to bench himself two weeks previously.

In October 2021, G2 announced the organization's first-ever all-female team, led by former CS:GO professional player Julia "Juliano" Kiran, which would compete in Valorant as G2 Gozen. In November 2022, Gozen won the VCT Game Changers Championship in Berlin, beating Shopify Rebellion 3–2 in the grand finals to become the first team to win a championship in both Valorant and CS:GO.

G2 was denied a partnership slot by Riot Games for the 2023 season, despite being one of the favorites to be selected. It was speculated to be because of an incident between former CEO Carlos Rodríguez and Andrew Tate.

G2 from December 2022 to July 2023 operated a North American roster that competed in the Valorant Challengers stage.

On 23 September G2 was announced as a non-partner team for VCT Americas in a two-year with their roster made up of former 4 players from Ascension winner The Guard with their coach and team manager.

On

==== Current roster ====
G2 Esports Valorant roster
Players
Coaches

Handle	Name	Nationality
jawgemo	Mor, Alexander	United States
trent	Cairns, Trent	United States
valyn	Batio, Jacob	United States
leaf	Orf, Nathan	United States
babybay	Francisty, Andrej	United States
JonahP (S)	Pulice, Jonah	Canada

Head coach

Josh "JoshRT" Lee

Assistant coach(es)

Peter "shhhack" Belej

Legend:
- (I) Inactive
- (S) Suspended
- Substitute
- (injured) Injury / Illness

Latest roster transaction: 7 October 2024.

G2 Esports Gozen Valorant roster
Players
Coaches

Handle	Name	Nationality
amy	Lai, Amy	Netherlands
mimi	Lintrup, Michaela	Denmark
Akita	Xu, Esllene	France
eva	Çakır, Nur	Turkey
Vania	Keskin, Aleyna	Turkey

Head coach

Drew "DrewSpark" Spark-Whitworth

Legend:
- (I) Inactive
- (S) Suspended
- Substitute
- (injured) Injury / Illness

Latest roster transaction: 8 February 2024.

=== Sim Racing ===
On 13 November 2017, G2 Esports signed Sim Racer Cem Bölükbaşı and Racing Team Manager Danny Engels. A joint venture saw the launch of new Sim Racing team FA Racing G2 Logitech G between G2 Esports and Formula One driver Fernando Alonso later that same month.

G2 would go on to launch a multi-year partnership with Red Bull Racing in the form of Red Bull Racing Esports Team, with drivers competing across multiple Sim Racing titles.

Danish racing driver Dennis Lind was signed as Sim Racing Lead on 12 April 2021.

=== Call of Duty ===
G2 Esports announced their Call of Duty roster for the Black Ops 4 season on 25 October 2018. The team did not qualify for that season's CWL Pro League.

On 5 December 2023, G2 announced that they had merged with Version1, owned by WISE Ventures (who also owned the Minnesota Vikings in the National Football League among other investments), which included operating rights to the Minnesota RØKKR team that plays in the Call of Duty League.

After failing to capitalize after placing fourth in Major 1, G2 announced they have dropped Owakening and Vivid in favor for Gunless and Standy.

After placing Top 12 for Major 4, G2 announced that they are dropping Gunless and Standy, later picking up Estreal and Diamondcon for the Esports World Cup.

G2 Minnesota roster
Players
Coaches

Handle	Name	Nationality
Abe	Abraham, Ronald	United States
Prolute	Vera, Byron	United States
Spart	Cervantez, Kris	United States
TJHaLy	Haly, Thomas	United States

Head coach

Daniel "Loony" Loza

Assistant coach(es)

Alexander "alexdotzip" Purpora

Legend:
- (I) Inactive
- (S) Suspended
- Substitute
- (injured) Injury / Illness

Latest roster transaction: November 2, 2026.

=== EVA ===
On 8 April 2026, G2 Esports announced that they would enter EVA (short for "Esports Virtual Arenas"), a virtual reality esport, signing a French roster who previously competed for EDS Esport. This also coincided with G2's inclusion in the EVA Pro League.

==== Current roster ====
G2 Esports EVA roster
Players
Coaches

Handle	Name	Nationality
Karim	Santal, Matthieu	France
MidNight	Hamadache, Killian	France
Ace	Potter, Killian	France
DimZy	Guerin, Chloé	France
Skyzer	Doloir, Guillaume	France

Head coach

Karim "Ebi" Bennaceur

Assistant coach(es)

Chanelle "LaChanou"

Legend:
- (I) Inactive
- (S) Suspended
- Substitute
- (injured) Injury / Illness

Latest roster transaction: 8 April 2026.

=== Kings League ===
On 2 April 2025, G2 Esports announced G2 Football Club (or G2 FC), a seven-a-side football team that would participate in the newly created German division of Kings League, founded by former Spanish football international and FC Barcelona player Gerard Piqué.

==== Current roster ====
Link:

Roster current as of 2026 Spring.

Manager: (Germany) Malik Hadziavdic
Note: Flags indicate national team as defined under FIFA eligibility rules; some limited exceptions apply. Players may hold more than one non-FIFA nationality.

No.	Pos.	Nation	Player
7	FW	GER	Dennis Öztürk
10	MF	GER	Tarik Hadziavdic
11	FW	MAR	Mohammed Izal
18	GK	GER	Jack Krause
19	DF	GER	Staas Mitko
27	FW	IRI	Artin Zardoshtian

No.	Pos.	Nation	Player
33	FW	GER	Kenan Smajlovic
44	FW	GER	Halit Bacak
47	DF	GER	Ahmed Omairat
61	DF	TUR	Cihan Ucar
77	MF	GER	Mehmet-Can Senocak
99	GK	GER	Ben Zöllner

==== History ====
Key of terms and abbreviations
Term or abbreviation	Definition
GP	Number of games played
W	Number of wins during regulation
SW	Number of shootout wins (wins in penalty shootouts)
SL	Number of shootout losses (losses in penalty shootouts)
L	Number of losses during regulation
GF	Goals for
GA	Goals against
GD	Goal difference
Position	Final position in the competition
Q?	How the team qualified for Kings World Cup Clubs or Kings Cup Europe Finals (if they did)

Kings League Germany

Split	GP	W	SW	SL	L	GF	GA	GD	Position
2025 Spring	9	6	0	0	3	31	44	−13	3rd (lost to ERA Colonia 2–14 in Second Ticket KWC Match)
2025 Cup	6	3	2	0	1	42	37	+5	Champions (defeated Youniors FC on penalties in the final)
2026 Spring	9	4	0	0	5	55	61	−4	Eliminated in the semifinals (lost to No Rules FC 7-3)

Kings Cup Europe Finals

Year	Q?	GP	W	SW	SL	L	GF	GA	GD	Position
2025	Qualified as champions	2	0	0	0	2	7	20	−13	3rd

Kings World Cup Clubs

Year	Q?	GP	W	SW	SL	L	GF	GA	GD	Position
2025	Qualified as 3rd place (Note: Kings League Germany was originally given 2 spots into the 2025 Kings World Cup Clubs, but was given a third spot into the tournament on 15 May 2025. Since G2 Football Club finished in 3rd place, they therefore qualified.)	2	0	0	0	2	3	12	−9	Eliminated in 2nd Round (lost 2–9 to Miami 7)
2026	Did not qualify	−	−	−	−	−	−	−	−	−

== Former divisions ==
=== Rocket League ===
G2 Esports signed the RLCS Season One world champions, former iBUYPOWER Cosmic on 7 September 2016.

Brandon "Lachinio" Lachin and Ted "0verZer0" Keil left the team, and Dillon "Rizzo" Rizzo and Jacob "JKnaps" Knapman were picked up on 22 February 2017.

The team won the ELEAGUE Cup 2017 tournament after missing RLCS Season 3.

The team finished 7th–8th at the RLCS World Championship Season 5, despite being the No. 1 seed from North America, and then finished 9th–10th in Season 6 as the No.2 seed from North America.

On 7 January 2019, the team dropped long-standing captain Cameron "Kronovi" Bills, and picked up Reed "Chicago" Wilen from Evil Geniuses. Kronovi went on to join Rogue. G2 then finished 2nd at the RLCS World Championship Season 7 with Chicago.

G2 missed out on RLCS Season 8 Finals after a 2–5 finish and a fight through Promotion Playoffs to retain their spot for the following season. After finishing second ahead of playoffs in RLCS Season 9, G2 faced NRG in the semifinals of the NA Regional Championship, winning 4–3 in a close Game 7 to put them through to the grand finals to face Spacestation Gaming. They would go on to sweep Spacestation, crowning them the RLCS Season 9 North American Champions.

Throughout RLCS X, G2 saw subsequent quarterfinal exits in playoffs in Regional Event #1 and Regional Event #2. The streak ended in Regional Event #3 when G2 were able to rematch and defeat The Peeps in the quarterfinals, before falling to Team Envy in semifinals. Due to consistent placements throughout RLCS X: The Grid, G2 were awarded the Wildcard slot at the RLCS Season X – Fall: North American Major where they would go on to finish 3rd–4th.

On 18 March 2021, during RLCS X, Rizzo announced his plans to retire from professional Rocket League competition, revealing the upcoming Regional Event would be his last event on the roster before leaving the G2 Esports organization entirely on 29 June 2021. Following Rizzo's decision to step down, 15-year-old Andres "Dreaz" Jordan played as a stand-in for the remainder of the season.

On 2 Janutary 2022.G2 traded Dreaz for Massimo "Atomic" Franceschi from Team Envy.

This roster would go on to win the RLCS Winter Major 2022 in Los Angeles, winning the organization's first RLCS LAN tournament in 5 years.

G2 made it to the RLCS 2021–22 World Championship as the No.1 seed from North America. There they would go undefeated and reach the grand final, there they faced a dominant Team BDS who were the No.2 seed from Europe. G2 would lose 4–1 in the finals.

G2 announced on 31 May 2023 a full female roster called G2 Luna.

G2 wouldn't make any changes to their roster and qualified for the RLCS 2022–23 World Championship as the No.4 seed. They would finish 5th–8th, once again losing to Team BDS 4–1 in the quarter finals.

Following the 2022–23 RLCS season, G2 released Chicago and JKnaps. On 22 September 2023, it was reported that G2 would be acquiring Daniel "Daniel" Piecenski and Landon "BeastMode" Konerman from Version1. On 5 December the merger between the two orgs succeeded with the RL roster rumors being confirmed two days later.

This roster would go on to dominate the RLCS scene making all 6 regional finals and winning 4 of them. They would finish second place at the first major in 2024 in Copenhagen, losing to Gentlemates. They would also make finals at the second major in London where they would beat Team Falcons to win their first LAN title in 2 years. With this success, G2 represented North America as the No.1 seed and one of the tournament favourites. G2 started off strong going 3–0 in Swiss stage. In the upper bracket quarter finals, G2 faced their old rivals BDS. In a 7 game marathon G2 lost but still had a chance to fight back. After two close games against South America’s Furia and Europe’s Karmine Corp, G2 made it to their 3rd final, tying BDS and Vitality for most World Finals. There they once again faced their archnemesis BDS. G2 proceeded to lose to them 4–2.

Despite the immense success the roster achieved throughout the year, G2 released their entire roster (including the Luna roster on 10 October) on 7 November 2024, after 8 years within the North American Rocket League scene.

=== Fortnite ===
G2 Esports' debut into Fortnite saw Brand Manager and Hearthstone Manager Jakub "Lothar" Szygulski transition back into a full-time streamer and became the first competitive Fortnite player under the organization. A second player, Dominik "RazZzero0o" Beckmann, was signed on 12 September 2018. Following the conclusion of G2: Making the Squad, the top four contestants were offered contracts, with Kevin "Tohaj" Batic later transitioning into a professional player role in January 2020.

Leading up to the reveal of G2 Atlantis on 31 May 2021, various Fortnite players in both Europe and North America were signed. The first signing was Sean "Coop" Cooper on 13 October 2020, followed by Kevin "LeTsHe" Fedjuschkin, Zach "smqcked" Ebersole, Jesus "Jelty" Navarez Espinoza and Mack "MackWood" Aesoph to complete the all-new lineup. G2 said goodbye to Coop on 6 July 2021.

=== Apex Legends ===
Initially fielding Apex Legends streamers, G2 Esports went on to sign an all-Finnish lineup of Sebastian "Mimu" Vesala, Aaro "rette" Hälli and Niko "ZeroNothing" Suominen in September 2019. The organization temporarily left the Apex scene and released its former players in April 2020.

G2 Esports returned to the Apex Legends scene with the signing of the former AimAssist roster on 1 June 2021 alongside new manager Christopher "BixLe" Dunbar.

=== Clash Royale ===
G2 Esports signed with Supercell to join in Clash Royale League (CRL) on 3 April 2018.

=== Heroes of the Storm ===
Before the rebrand from Gamers2, G2 had an all-Polish Heroes of the Storm roster in 2015.

=== Overwatch ===
During the game's beta and while still known as G2.Kinguin, an Overwatch roster that was composed of retired European Team Fortress 2 players briefly competed under G2.

=== Paladins ===
G2 Esports signed Team CryptiK's Paladins roster on 31 August 2017. The team went on to win Paladins Premier League North America Summer 2018 and the Paladins Premier League Summer Finals 2018. G2 left the Paladins scene in early 2019.

=== PlayerUnknown's Battlegrounds ===
G2 Esports previously fielded PlayerUnknown's Battlegrounds rosters from 2017 until 2020.

=== Super Smash Bros. Melee ===
G2 Esports signed Weston "Westballz" Dennis on 11 July 2016, but Dennis and G2 parted ways on 31 March 2019.

== Notes ==
Awards and achievements
Preceded by PENTA Sports; TSM	Six Invitational winner 2019; 2023	Succeeded by Spacestation Gaming w7m esports
Preceded by Royal Never Give Up	Mid-Season Invitational winner 2019	Succeeded by Royal Never Give Up
Preceded by Fnatic; Fnatic; MAD Lions	League of Legends European Championship winner Spring 2016 – Summer 2017; Spring 2019 – Summer 2020; Spring 2022	Succeeded by Fnatic; MAD Lions; Rogue
