= Gigi =

Gigi may refer to:

== Colette novella-related ==
- Gigi (novella), a 1944 novella by the French writer Colette
  - Gigi (1949 film), a French adaptation of the novella by Jacqueline Audry
  - Gigi (1958 film), an American musical by Vincente Minnelli, based on the novella
    - Gigi (soundtrack)
    - Gigi (musical), a 1973 musical based on the 1958 film
  - Gigi (play), a 1951 Broadway play based on the novella, starring Audrey Hepburn

== Music ==
- Gigi (Canadian band), a Canadian pop music group
- Gigi (Indonesian band), a rock group from Indonesia
- Gigi, 2001 album by Ethiopian singer Ejigayehu Shibabaw
- Gigi (Hank Jones album), a 1958 jazz album by pianist Hank Jones
- Gigi (André Previn album), a 1958 jazz album by André Previn, Shelly Manne and Red Mitchell
- "Gigi" (song), from the 1958 film

== People ==
=== Given name ===
- Gigi Causey, American producer
- Gigi De Lana (born 1995), Filipina singer
- Gigi Edgley (born 1977), Australian actress
- Gigi Fenster, South African-born New Zealand author, creative writing teacher and law lecturer
- Gigi Foster, American-born Australian economist
- Gigi Garanzini (born 1948), Italian sports journalist
- Gigi Gaston, American writer-director
- Gigi Saul Guerrero (born 1990), Mexican-Canadian filmmaker and actress
- Gigi Hadid (born 1995), American model and television personality
- Gigi Hamilton (born 1965), Swedish singer and songwriter
- Gigi Hewitt (born 1972), equestrian who represents the United States Virgin Islands
- Gigi Ion (born 1967), Romanian football player
- Gigi Lai (born 1971), Hong Kong singer and actress
- Gigi Leung (born 1976), Hong Kong singer and actress
- Gigi MacKenzie (born 1962), smooth jazz artist
- Gigi Militaru (born 1986), Romanian rugby union footballer
- Gigi Masin (born 1955), Italian composer
- Gigi Murin, American VTuber
- Gigi Padovani (born 1953), article writer
- Gigi Parrish (1912–2006), American film actress
- Gigi Perreau (born 1941), American film actress
- Gigi Sohn, former president and co-founder of Public Knowledge
- Gigi Talcott (born 1944), American politician
- Gigi Vesigna (1932–2015), Italian journalist and writer
- Gigi Vorgan (born 1958), American writer and producer
- Gigi Raven Wilbur, American bisexual rights activist and writer
- Gigi Yim (born 2005), Hong Kong singer and actress

=== Nickname ===
- Gigi D'Alessio (born 1967), Italian singer and songwriter
- Gigi Becali (born 1958), controversial Romanian politician and businessman
- Gianluigi Buffon (born 1978), Italian football goalkeeper
- Gigi Hadid (born 1995), American model and television personality Daughter of a tycoon
- Gigi Fernández (born 1964), Puerto Rican former tennis player
- Gigi Galli (born 1973), Italian rally driver
- Gigi Gryce (1925–1983), American musician, composer, arranger, educator and big band bandleader
- Gigi Meroni (1943–1967), Italian footballer
- Gigi Proietti (1940–2020), Italian actor, director and singer
- Luigi Riva (born 1944), Italian former footballer
- Gigi Tsereteli (born 1964), vice-speaker of the Parliament of Georgia
- Luigi Weiss (born 1951), Italian ski mountaineer and former biathlete

=== Stage name ===
- Gigi (singer) (born 1974), Ethiopian singer (real name "Ejigayehu Shibabaw")
- Gigi D'Agostino (born 1967), Italian DJ
- Gigi Goode (born 1997/8), American drag queen
- Gigi Gorgeous (born 1992), Canadian internet personality
- Gigi Perreau (born 1941), American actress

=== Surname ===
- Asha Gigi (born 1973), Ethiopian long-distance runner
- Robert Gigi (1926–2007), French cartoonist, illustrator and archivist

== Other uses ==
- Gigi, the English dub name of the anime Magical Princess Minky Momo
- Gigi Morasco, a character on the American soap opera One Life to Live
- LELO Gigi, a sex toy
- Pelteobagrus nudiceps (ギギ Gigi) (/ˈɡɪɡɪ/), a Japanese catfish

== See also ==
- Igor Cassini (1915–2002), American syndicated gossip columnist nicknamed "Ghighi"
- Gigli (disambiguation)
