= Gigli (disambiguation) =

Gigli is a 2003 American romantic comedy film.

Gigli may also refer to:

== People ==
- Abel Gigli (born 1990), Italian footballer
- Angelo Gigli (born 1983), Italian basketball player
- Beniamino Gigli (1890–1957), Italian tenor
- Elena Gigli (born 1985), Italian water polo goalkeeper
- Gigli Ndefe (born 1994), Dutch-Angolan footballer
- Giovanni Cobolli Gigli (born 1945), Italian lawyer and former president of Juventus Football Club
- Giovanni de' Gigli (dead 1498), Italian Roman Catholic prelate
- Girolamo Gigli (1660–1722), Italian playwright
- Giuseppe Cobolli Gigli (1892–1987), Italian politician
- Irma Gigli (born 1931), Argentine academic
- Leonardo Gigli (1863–1908), Italian obstetrician who invented the Gigli saw
- Luca Antonio Gigli (died 1620), Italian Roman Catholic prelate
- Ormond Gigli (died 2019), American photographer
- Romeo Gigli (born 1949), Italian fashion designer
- Silvestro de' Gigli (died 1521), Italian Roman Catholic prelate

== Other uses ==
- Campanelle or gigli or riccioli, type of pasta shaped like a bell or flower
- Gigli saw, flexible wire bone saw used by surgeons
- 10371 Gigli, minor planet

== See also ==
- Giglio (disambiguation)
- Gigi (disambiguation)
