= Michelle G. Giglio =

Researcher and biocurator

- Born: Michelle Gwinn
- Education: University of Maryland, College Park; Johns Hopkins School of Medicine
- Scientific career
- Fields: Biocuration, genomics, transcriptomics, metagenomics
- Workplaces: Institute for Genomic Research; University of Maryland School of Medicine

Michelle Gwinn Giglio is an American biocurator. At the Institute for Genome Sciences (IGS), University of Maryland School of Medicine, she is a professor in the Department of Medicine and the Associate IGS Director for Education and Outreach.

== Life ==
Giglio earned a B.S. from the University of Maryland, College Park in 1990. She completed a Ph.D. at the Johns Hopkins School of Medicine in 1997. Her dissertation was titled, Studies on the regulation of competence development in Haemophilus influenzae Rd. She was a postdoctoral researcher at The Institute for Genomic Research (TIGR) from 1997 to 1998.

From 1998 to 2007, Giglio was a staff scientist at The Institute for Genomic Research. From 2007 to 2015, she was an assistant professor in the Department of Medicine and the Institute for Genome Sciences at the University of Maryland School of Medicine. She became an associate professor in 2015 and a professor in 2024. Her research work focuses primarily on employing robust data standards to capture data and metadata around genomics, transcriptomics, and metagenomics within the context of data coordination centers for large consortium projects. Giglio also does a lot of work in the areas of training and outreach.
