= Ekaterina Gordeeva and Sergei Grinkov =

Russian pair skating team, 1981–1995

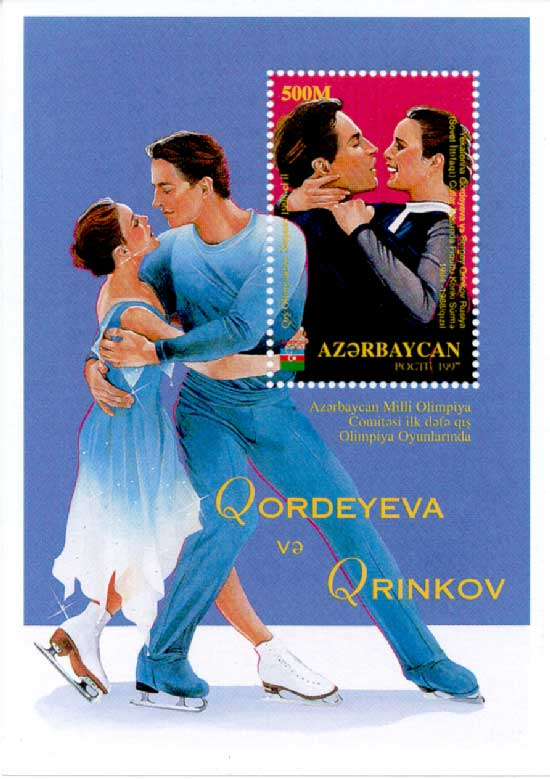
Gordeeva and Grinkov on a Stamp of Azerbaijan

Ekaterina Gordeeva and Sergei Grinkov were a Soviet and Russian pair skating team. The pair won many international championships, including the 1988 and 1994 Winter Olympics and four World Figure Skating Championships (1986, 1987, 1989, 1990), and many other competitions.

They married in 1991. In 1995, Grinkov collapsed on the ice during a practice session in Lake Placid, New York, and died of a heart attack. They had skated together for 14 years.
