= Earthsiege 2 =

1996 video game

- Developer: Dynamix
- Publisher: Sierra On-Line
- Director: Mark Crowe
- Producer: Frank Evers
- Designer: David Selle
- Programmer: Paul Bowman
- Artist: Robert Caracol
- Composer: Loudmouth
- Platform: Windows
- Release: March 19, 1996
- Genre: Vehicle simulation
- Mode: Single player

Earthsiege 2 is a mech-style vehicle simulation game developed by Dynamix, produced by Frank Evers (NYPH), and released in 1996. Earthsiege 2 is set in the Earthsiege universe, which contains its predecessors Earthsiege (1994) and Battledrome (1995), as well as the action game Hunter Hunted (1996), strategy games MissionForce: CyberStorm (1997) and Cyberstorm 2: Corporate Wars (1998), simulation Starsiege (1999), and first-person shooters Starsiege: Tribes (1999), Tribes 2 (2001), Tribes: Aerial Assault (2002), Tribes: Vengeance (2004) and Tribes: Ascend (2012).

As a simulation, Earthsiege 2 gives players the opportunity to pilot massive bipedal war machines known as HERCULANs (Humaniform-Emulation Roboticized Combat Unit with Leg-Articulated Navigation) (or 'HERCs' for short). Set in 2624, Earthsiege 2 features advanced weapons and technology for waging war. Earthsiege 2 takes place across North America, South America, Antarctica, Asia, Australia, Europe, and the moon.

Earthsiege 2 features a more advanced engine than Earthsiege, increasing the game's maximum resolution to 640*480. Additionally, the game features much more detailed terrain than its predecessor. Earthsiege 2 has 3D rolling terrain rather than the flat landscape of Earthsiege. Furthermore, video briefings and debriefings, along with included squadmate voices, add to the atmosphere of the game.

In 2015, Earthsiege 2 was released as freeware by Hi-Rez Studios.

== Plot ==
For twenty years, the remnants of the human race fought against the Cybrid oppressors aided by pre-Cybrid Hercs. After the destruction of the Cybrid army, the humans maintained their control on Earth, but another Cybrid army came from space colonies for another attack. The humans were able to prevent initial landings, but were about to face the Cybrids as they built their strength on the moon.

== Gameplay ==
Earthsiege 2 features more advanced terrain.

=== Camera ===
Earthsiege 2 allows the player the option of playing in multiple viewpoints between first and third person(external).

=== Mechanics ===
The player controls a "Herc" with the keyboard and/or joystick, while the mouse can be used to interact with buttons in the cockpit. Eight Hercs are available for piloting, each with its own unique characteristics.

As in Earthsiege, the player is allowed up to three squadmates per mission. Squadmate Hercs are assigned and outfitted by the player, and squadmates gain experience as they complete missions.

=== Salvage ===
Destroyed Hercs and buildings leave behind salvage metal, weapons, and equipment that are added to the player's inventory for use in later missions.

=== Missions ===
Missions in Earthsiege 2 include a branching mission structure. Failure in a mission does not always mean failure of the overall game. In many cases, the player can continue, albeit on a different mission than if the player had succeeded. Also, missions can have varying degrees of success. For example, if the player is assigned to protect several bases that are under attack, the loss of one or two bases may not indicate failure. The degree of success can also indicate what the next mission will be.

Certain missions give various bonuses for success. These are usually access to a new kind of weapon or piece of equipment, but in a few cases, the player is rewarded for victory with a new type of Herc chassis. In some cases, the equipment is made available later in the game if the player fails the mission, but in other cases, failure means never being able to access the equipment.

Some missions are terminal if failed. The last sequence of missions, leading to the fight with Prometheus on Luna, must be won or the game ends. But in most cases, failure only leads to ending the game if the player has already failed one or more missions previously.

=== Herc construction ===
Hercs are customizable in the game. Each individual Herc chassis has its own properties, including armor, shield output, speed, and how many hardpoints it has for mounting equipment. Weapons and other equipment are mounted directly to hardpoints, and each hardpoint has a list of equipment that can be mounted there. One of the principal advantages of the larger Hercs is the greater availability of hardpoints for mounting more weapons and more equipment.

== Reception ==
Reception

Review scores
Publication	Score
Computer Gaming World	3.5/5
GameSpot	6.1/10
Next Generation	4/5
Computer Player	7/10
Computer Game Review	90/100

Chris Hudak of GameSpot praised the game's graphics and mission difficulty versus MechWarrior 2. Computer Gaming World also praised the game's graphics, stating it was the best-looking on the market, but noted there was "nothing that will leave a lasting impression or a hunger for Earth Siege 3." The magazine also criticized the lack of a printed manual and likened it to buying a console game. A Next Generation critic said the game offers solid improvements over the first Earthsiege in the form of graphics, enemy AI, and the strategic element of looting disabled enemy units for parts (which he noted had been lifted from MechWarrior 2). He criticized the missions as lacking in variety, but concluded that "if you want fast action, good pacing, and incredible gameplay and graphics, EarthSiege 2 shines in all the right places."

== Modern systems and memory issues ==
A stock, out-of-box installation from the original CD can be made functional on systems with large amounts of memory by applying a small binary patch to the game's executable. [See External Links]

The patch addresses a memory-detection issue in the original executable that can cause the game to malfunction when run on systems with amounts of RAM considerably greater than those available when the game was released. The patch is distributed in BPS (Beat Patching System) format and must be applied to an original copy of the game's executable. This avoids distributing a modified copy of the copyrighted executable.

Install Earthsiege 2 from the original CD.
Apply the BPS patch to the installed game's executable using a compatible patching utility.
Download and install the replacement AVI files available from the Earthsiege 2 community. These files replace the original game's video files, which may not play correctly with modern video software.
Launch the game.

The patch has been confirmed to run from a clean, unmodified CD installation under Kubuntu 26.04 with Lutris and wine-ge-8-26 (x86_64).

The BPS patch does not contain the original game executable or other copyrighted game assets; users must provide their own copy of the game.
