= Earthsiege =

Earthsiege is a series of games, spun off from the Metaltech series, which led into the Starsiege and Tribes (series) afterward. It includes:

- Metaltech: Earthsiege (1994)
- Earthsiege 2 (1996)
- The CyberStorm series (1996)
- Starsiege (1999)
