= Metaltech =

Metaltech may refer to:

== Games ==
- Metaltech, a video game series developed by Dynamix of Sierra, currently owned by Hi-Rez Studios
  - Metaltech: Battledrome
  - Metaltech: Earthsiege
  - Earthsiege 2
  - Starsiege

== Music ==
- Metaltech (band), a Scottish Electro Rock band
