= Starsiege =

1999 video game

- Developer: Dynamix
- Publisher: Sierra On-Line
- Director: Rick Overman
- Producer: Ken Embery
- Designer: David Selle
- Programmer: Rick Overman
- Artist: Mike Jahnke
- Writers: Blake Hutchins; Ian Christy
- Composer: Timothy Steven Clarke
- Platform: Microsoft Windows
- Release: NA: March 19, 1999; UK: May 14, 1999
- Genre: Vehicle simulation
- Modes: Single player, Multiplayer

Starsiege is a mecha-style vehicle simulation game developed by Dynamix and released in 1999. Starsiege is set in the Metaltech/Earthsiege universe, which contains its predecessors Earthsiege (1994), Battledrome (1994), and Earthsiege 2 (1996). This universe also includes action game Hunter Hunted (1996), strategy games Mission Force: Cyberstorm (1996) and Cyberstorm 2: Corporate Wars (1998). It also includes the sequels Starsiege: Tribes (actually released before Starsiege) and all subsequent Tribes titles. In 2015, this game and the rest of the Metaltech/Tribes series were released as freeware by Hi-Rez Studios, but Battledrome and the Cyberstorm series were not.

== Plot ==
Starsiege takes place in the 29th century, portraying the conflict between humanity and the artificially intelligent Cybrid war machines. Played out in various locations throughout the Solar System, the story examines both civil unrest in the colonies and an all-or-nothing genocidal invasion by the machines. Bipedal mecha known as HERCs are the mainstay of ground-based combat, and the focus of gameplay.

Humanity is nominally united in an interplanetary Empire, led from Earth by the Immortal Emperor Solomon Petresun. Petresun's policy is the defence of Earth at all costs. While Earth is prosperous and well protected, the colonies on Luna, Mars, and Venus suffer from increasingly harsh regulations and production quotas. The combat units of the Empire are represented by the Imperial Police, Terran Defense Force and the Imperial Knights. The former paramilitary group is responsible for maintaining order in the colonies. The Terran Defense Force are the standard military with bases from Mercury to Titan. The Knights, led by Grand Master Caanon Weathers, are the military's elite and are provided with the best pilots and equipment.

The inequality between the colonies and Earth foments rebellion. In 2802 there are two guerilla movements on Mars, one that concentrates on destroying and capturing Imperial infrastructure and supplies and another bent on killing Imperial personnel and sympathizers. Both groups operate from underground bases and make do with modified mining HERCs and tanks. The rebels partially offset their disadvantages with superior weapons taken from the alien "Tharsis Cache"; an underground stockpile of alien technology discovered by rebels while digging new tunnels. Eventually the rebellion becomes too great for the police to contain and the Knights are deployed to Mars to crush the insurrection.

The Cybrids are a race of sentient robots responsible for the first Earthsiege. They are led by the first Cybrid, Prometheus, who is revered with god-like status. The Cybrids established themselves in the outer Solar System after being defeated two centuries before during the first Earthsiege. Since then they have built up their strength for another bid to destroy humanity and claim Earth for their own. Like the Martian rebels, the Cybrids discover their own cache of alien weapons and adapt it to use, but their cache is inferior to the Tharsis Cache.

The game offers two story campaigns, with different endings. The Human campaign puts the player in control of a Martian rebel, initially fighting the Empire before humanity unites against the Cybrid invasion midway through the campaign. The human campaign culminates in an attack on Prometheus on Pluto, resulting in the destruction of Prometheus and the Cybrids collapsing into civil war.

The Cybrid campaign starts with their invasion across the outer colonies and proceeds to Earth, ending in an assault on the Imperial palace to kill Petresun. The Cybrids then begin systematically exterminating the human population.

The "Scannex" which can be read in between missions provides additional information. The Human campaign implies that Petresun is killed, while the Cybrid campaign implies that human forces reached Pluto to destroy Prometheus.

== Gameplay ==
As a simulation, Starsiege offers players the ability to pilot a wide variety of massive bipedal war machines known as HERCULANs (Humaniform-Emulation Roboticized Combat Unit with Leg-Articulated Navigation) (or 'HERCs' for short), as well as several tanks. Set in 2829, Starsiege contains an array of advanced technology, and numerous upgrades are available for each vehicle. Starsiege takes place across a number of planets and moons in the Solar System, offering a range of different locations throughout the game and in multiplayer battles, including Earth, Titan, Luna, Mars, Venus, and Mercury. There are two campaigns, Human and Cybrid.

Gameplay in Starsiege revolves around mechanized combat - piloting HERCs and tanks in combat against opposing vehicles. Both types of vehicles can be controlled via any combination of keyboard, joystick, or mouse input. Starsiege abandoned the "torso-twist" gameplay mechanic common in many mecha simulations (including preceding games in the series), a feature that would normally allow the user to swivel the HERC's upper body independently of its legs. In Starsiege, torso orientation is fixed forward, but the player can move the aiming recticle across the screen with a mouse, a feature GameSpot compared to playing a first-person shooter. In both campaigns, the player is eventually assigned squadmates and is able to issue basic commands to them.

Every vehicle has unique performance, though this can be modified somewhat through customization of parts. Tanks and HERCs both utilize armor for defense, but HERCs also can equip rechargeable shields for additional protection. Other part choices include weapons, engine, and engine boosters. Customizing the player's vehicle is an important element of gameplay, particularly in multiplayer - a proper balance between all of the components is necessary to assure the player a reasonable chance of success.

Multiplayer gameplay includes classic modes deathmatch, team deathmatch, and capture the flag.

== Development ==
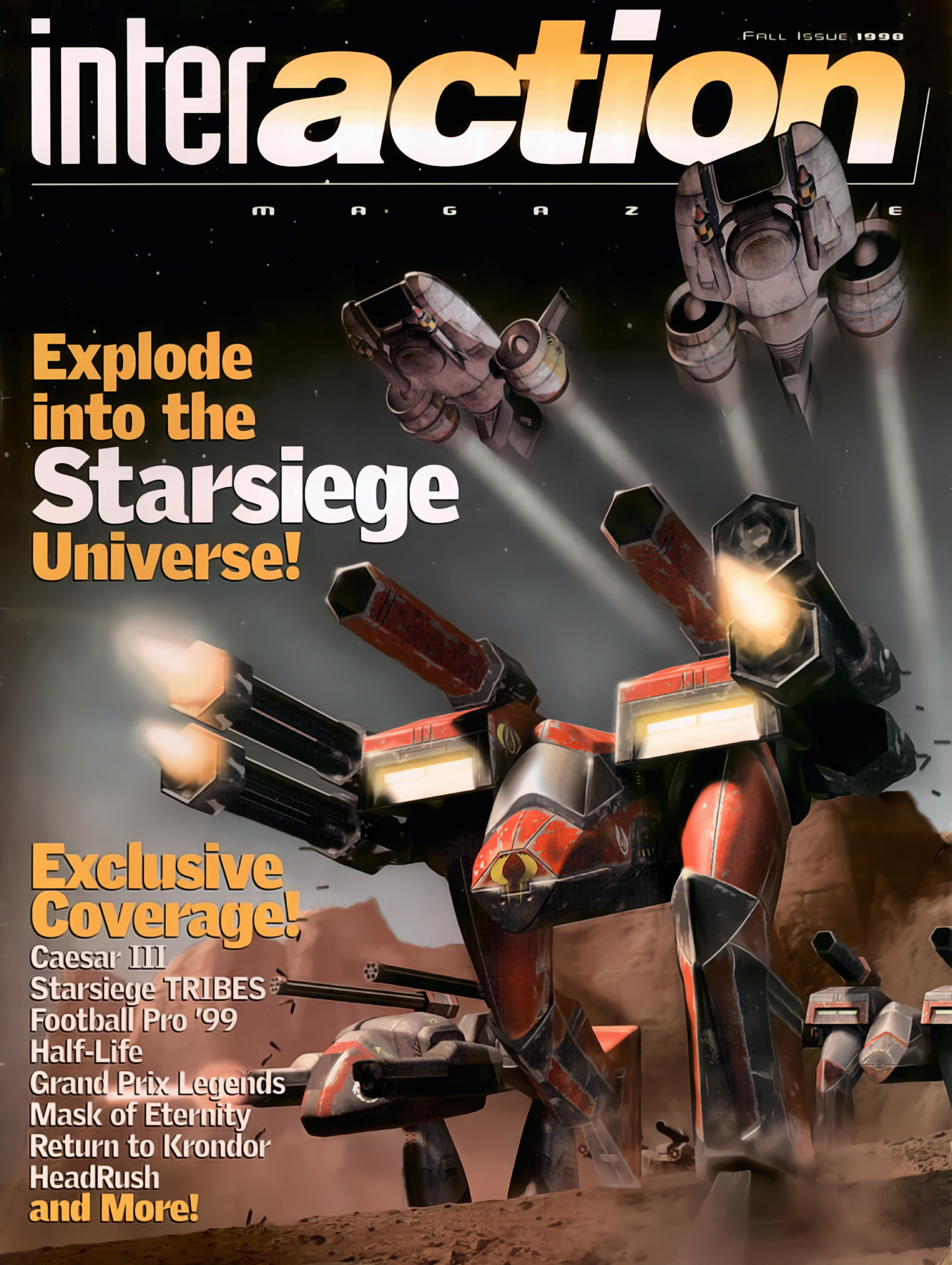
Starsiege on the cover of Interaction, a fan magazine by Sierra On-Line.

The game was announced in May 1998.

== Reception ==
Reception

Aggregate score
Aggregator	Score
GameRankings	76%

Review scores
Publication	Score
CNET Gamecenter	9/10
Computer Games Strategy Plus	2/5
Computer Gaming World	4.5/5
GamePro	(Adler) 3.5/5 (BF) 3/5
GameRevolution	B+
GameSpot	7.3/10
IGN	7.7/10
Next Generation	4/5
PC Accelerator	7/10
PC Gamer (US)	80%

Starsiege received "generally favorable reviews" according to the review aggregation website GameRankings. IGN highlighted the well presented package and cutscenes, graphically impressive (whilst sparse) landscapes, intuitive controls and the longevity of the multiplayer mode. The minimal sound effects were criticised, with muddled voice-overs, and some of human HERC models were felt to be a bit bland and generic. GameSpot said, "Starsiege brings new life to a genre otherwise devoid of it, even if it doesn't really succeed in elevating robot sims out of their long-term rut." Next Generation called it "a worthy successor to the Earthsiege series [that] should be just as attractive to fans of Heavy Gear or Mechwarrior II [sic]."

In February 1999, Dynamix announced that it would launch the game with a shipment of 250,000 units to retailers. It sold 36,000 units in the U.S. by the end of July 1999, according to PC Data. Calling these figures "pitiful", Mark Asher of CNET Gamecenter wrote, "Sierra gave this game a big push and it just didn't sell, and now most of Dynamix is gone."

The same website nominated the game for its 1999 "Best Sci-Fi Simulation" award, but gave the prize to MechWarrior 3.

== Sequels ==
The first-person shooters Starsiege: Tribes (1998; released before Starsiege), Tribes 2 (2001), Tribes: Aerial Assault (2002), Tribes: Vengeance (2004) and Tribes: Ascend (2012) followed this game.

Starsiege 2845 was a game in development from 2003 to 2007. Like the later Tribes Universe game developed in 2010–2011, it stagnated into hiatus and was not completed.

In 2015, the game was bundled with Starsiege: Tribes and released as freeware by Hi-Rez Studios.

In September 2022, Prophecy Games announced Starsiege: Deadzone, a first-person PvP and PvE looter shooter with procedurally generated environments.
