= Cyber Storm =

Cyber Storm may refer to:

== Computing and military ==
- Cyber Storm, an annual cyber security competition at Louisiana Tech University
- Cyber Storm Exercise, a 2006 American military exercise
- CyberStorm PPC, a PowerPC based upgrade card PowerUP for the Amiga

== Arts and entertainment ==
- Cyberstorm (novel), a 2013 book published by Matthew Mather
- MissionForce: CyberStorm, a 1996 video game
  - CyberStorm 2: Corporate Wars a 1998 sequel
