= Midair (video game) =

2018 video game

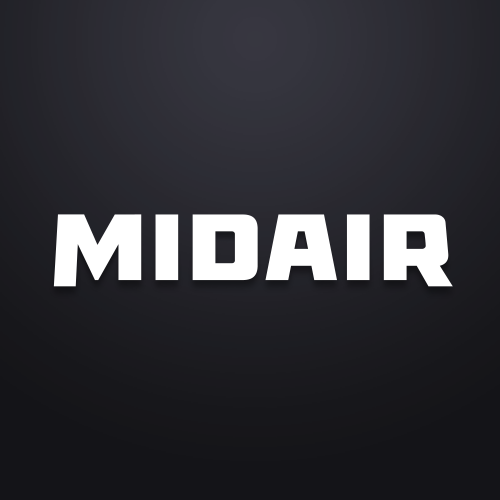
- Developer(s): Archetype Studios
- Publisher(s): Archetype Studios
- Engine: Unreal Engine 4
- Platform(s): Microsoft Windows
- Release: May 3, 2018
- Genre(s): First-person shooter
- Mode(s): Multiplayer

Midair is a free-to-play first-person shooter by Archetype Studios. The game emphasizes freedom of movement with jetpacks and skiing, while also featuring large open maps and vehicles. The game was developed using Unreal Engine 4, and was released on May 3, 2018.

== Gameplay ==
Midair screenshot.

Midair features mechanics similar to games from the Tribes game series, including mechanics such as 'skiing' which allows the player to glide across the terrain.

A 3/4/5 weapons system similar to Starsiege: Tribes and Tribes 2 is implemented; 3 weapons for Light armor, 4 weapons for Medium armor, and 5 weapons for Heavy armor. There is no health regeneration in the game. The game features the ability to equip certain abilities and items, as well as the ability to modify the game using certain 'packs' (such as health regeneration, cloaking, etc.). The features include the deployment of moving and non-moving entities such as vehicles and stationary sentries.

=== Game Modes ===
Game modes currently include Capture the Flag, Light Capture the Flag, Arena, and Rabbit. Public matches consist of team-sizes similar to Tribes: Ascend's 16v16, while competitive team sizes vary between 5v5 and 11v11, depending on the game mode.

== Monetization ==
Midair features an unlock system and a progression system. As players progress, they will unlock items such as weapons, packs, items, and deployable structures. Players have the option of buying a DLC _{(downloadable content)}, which unlocks all current and future items. Cosmetic items must be purchased separately. This is comparable to SMITE's one-time payment option.

== Development ==
The project originally began as a port of Legions: Overdrive to the Unity game engine in 2012 by former Legions: Overdrive developers. After taking into consideration how much time and effort would be required, the team decided to make a full-fledged sequel to Legions: Overdrive. However, in 2013 the developers decided to change plans and develop a new game altogether.

After working with Unity for roughly a year, the developers switched to Unreal Engine 4 shortly after the engine's release in March, 2014.

On August 15, 2014, Archetype Studios officially announced as the development studio for the then-titled Project Z, along with an official website and concept art for the game. Midair made its first public unveiling to those who attended the studios (off-site) presentation during PAX Prime 2014 on August 30, 2014.

On April 26, 2015, the game was officially renamed to Midair. The official website was launched, and a teaser trailer was released.

On August 29, 2015, a pre-alpha build was available to play during PAX Prime 2015.

On December 22, 2015, a Steam Greenlight campaign was launched for Midair. The first official gameplay trailer was also released. On December 29 they achieved Greenlight status.

On May 5, 2016, Archetype Studios launched a crowdfunding campaign on Kickstarter for Midair with a goal of $100,000. On June 4 the campaign ended with $128,000.

On March 26, 2017, Midair entered the alpha stage of development.

On August 17, 2017, Archetype Studios announced that the closed beta for Midair would launch on August 25. They also announced that the full release would be pushed from November 2017 to Q1 2018.

On August 25, 2017, Midair entered the closed beta stage of development. It was also released on Steam's Early Access platform, as well as Itch.io.

On May 2, 2018, the game was released to the public.

On Jun 7, 2018, Archetype Studios released a patch with new content and gameplay fixes, along with news stating that they would be scaling back development.

On January 10, 2019, Archetype Studios released patch 1.0.2. It featured several new maps and gameplay updates, mainly from the community.

In 2020 Midair would receive it last update before the closure of Archetype Studios. With the release of Midair 2 (former Midair CE) by Vector-Z Studios, Midair's servers would be closed and the game is currently only playable in single mode.
