= InstantAction =

Web gaming site and digital distributor

- Industry: Video games
- Founded: 2007
- Defunct: 2010
- Headquarters: Las Vegas, Nevada, USA
- Key people: Louis Castle: CEO
- Parent: IAC/InterActiveCorp
- Website: InstantAction.com

InstantAction was a web gaming site and digital distributor featuring 3D, browser-based games.

The site was created by GarageGames after being acquired by IAC/InterActiveCorp in 2007 and released a year later. InstantAction's goal was to allow publishers and developers the ability to embed games across the internet through the use of InstantAction's embed-tech. Publishers were then able to set monetary rates, including social features, release free demos and more. Users were required to download an initial plug-in that would be used across all games using the InstantAction platform. Game downloads were transparently broken into small "chunks", which were streamed onto disk behind the scenes, allowing players to start playing much faster than ordinary downloads. The games were downloaded to the user's hard-drive, allowing them to play the game instantly after initial download, wherever the game was embedded.

InstantAction's platform initially hosted eight games that featured the ability to add friends, chat, and create parties which could jump from game to game together without being forced to leave the party and rejoin it. In 2010, these games were taken down after InstantAction announced it was focusing on embedded 3D gaming technology for external websites, rather than operating its own website. Several developers have shown interest in releasing said games at some point, however.

On November 11, 2010, it was announced that InstantAction would be "winding down" their operations.

== History ==
In 2007, GarageGames was acquired by Barry Diller and IAC/InterActiveCorp and was renamed InstantAction. Soon after this announcement, InstantAction.com went into open beta on March 31, 2008.

On July 15, 2009, it was announced that Louis Castle would become the new CEO of GarageGames, after Josh Williams stepped down in late 2008. It was also announced that InstantAction would be split into two divisions, one in Portland, Oregon and the other in Las Vegas, Nevada.

On March 13, 2010, InstantAction.com was taken down as a gaming portal, with the company instead moving to support the embedding of 3D games on external websites. On April 29, 2010, the company released a 20-minute demo of The Secret of Monkey Island: Special Edition with the option to buy the full game, while the previous games, known as the Arcade, remained offline. This was the first game to take advantage of their new embed-tech platform.

On August 16, 2010, the company unveiled Instant Jam at Gamescom. It launched in open beta and was the company's second, and ultimately last game to feature their embed-tech.

On October 23, 2010, it was announced that InstantAction sold the Tribes IP to Hi-Rez Studios, developers of Global Agenda. Shortly thereafter, it was also announced that their game platform deal with Penny Arcade to release PlayGreenhouse.com had been withdrawn, along with their deal with Mad Otter Games to host their MMO A Mystical Land.

On November 11, 2010, InstantAction's community manager announced that the company was shutting down, though the TorquePowered.com website would be kept active. InstantAction stated that they were "winding down operations" and thanked all their customers "for their support."

On December 22, 2010, Eric Preisz posted an update informing everyone that they were no longer looking for buyers of their Torque engine, and that the future "looks bright."

On January 20, 2011, it was announced that Graham Software Development were the new owners of the Torque engine, and the company was renamed back to GarageGames.

== Games ==
Fallen Empire: Legions was a first-person shooter that consisted of two teams: team alpha and team beta. The game included several gametypes, including Deathmatch, Team Deathmatch and Capture the Flag. It was considered a "spiritual successor" to Tribes, and featured similar elements such as skiing and jetpacks. After InstantAction was shut down, the game was re-released as a stand-alone downloadable client on December 20, 2010. The game is being developed by community members and previous InstantAction interns.Visit www.legionsoverdrive.com to play the game. \

Rokkitball was a team-based game similar to basketball or soccer with futuristic weaponry. The game launched on InstantAction.com in April 2008 with support for up to eight players. Players move around an arena and use a magnetic beam to grab a ball and shoot it into holes in the wall to score points. Smaller, higher holes are worth more points than the lower, larger ones. Players have a limited amount of energy, which is needed to sprint and to use the "magno-beam" that holds the ball. Energy constantly regenerates when not being used. Players can shoot rockets in order to propel the ball, make enemy players lose all their energy, or knock the ball out of an enemy’s grip. There were four arenas for Rokkitball: Gauntlet, Cathedral, S-Hook, and Canyon. It is currently unknown what the future of Rokkitball is.

Marble Blast Ultra is a 3D platformer in which the player maneuvers a marble to collect gems or reach the end of the level. Variations of this game have been developed for the Xbox 360 and Microsoft Windows.

Lore: Aftermath was a multiplayer mech combat game, and a sequel to Dark Horizons Lore: Invasion. Players control mechs called MAV, and can use preconfigured mechs or access the “MAV Lab” to create their own with customized looks, weapons, and statistics. The developers are planning on distributing the game elsewhere once they secure the rights from InstantAction.

Think Tanks was originally created as a stand-alone game for the PC, and was eventually ported to InstantAction. There are two game modes: Deathmatch(Battlemode) and Scrum. Both can be played with or without teams. In Battlemode, players try to shoot and destroy the other tanks. In Scrum, players try to get a ball and drive it to a goal placed on the field. The game is no longer available to purchase. However here is a small but dedicated community at www.planetthinktanks2.com. An independent master server and game servers are running. The community has also expanded the game types to multiple game types: Capture the Flag, Keepaway, Dodgeball, & Rollerball. The game is very easily modded and there are currently thousands of unique maps available. These include all of the maps, objects and effects developed for the failed InstantAction platform.

ZAP! was a multiplayer top-down space shooter. The player controls a triangular ship and tries to accomplish different objectives depending on the mode. Most modes involve shooting enemy ships with various weapons and moving flags around. There are six modes in ZAP! These include BustIn, CTF (Capture the Flag), ZoneControl, Retrieve, Hunters, and ZapMatch. The game is no longer available to play or purchase. However, its successor Bitfighter, is currently being developed by a small community.

Galcon is a real-time strategy game where players try to eliminate the enemy by sending ships to take over their planets. Every ship that is sent will destroy one ship docked on the enemy planet; once the planet is reduced to 0 ships, a ship can conquer it. The planet will then begin to produce ships for the new owner. The goal is to capture all the planets on that particular map. While no longer available on InstantAction, it's available for purchase at Galcon.com

Ace of Aces is a World War I dog-fighting game where players fly fighter planes and attempt to score points by shooting down enemy planes or blowing up the enemy base. Players can choose to play as either the Axis or the Allies. In the single-player Training Mode, players can complete two tutorials: one on Marksmanship, which teaches the basic controls, and one on Ground Attack, which teaches how to assault the enemy base. The Multiplayer Battle Mode features five different modes: Team Dogfight, Furball, Fox and Hounds, Rescue the Spy (CTF), and Base War. Mad Otter Games, the developers of Ace of Aces, are planning on re-releasing the game at AceofAcesthegame.com.

Rev was an arcade racing game developed by Luma Arcade. It never got past the private beta phase, though the developers have still shown interest in releasing the game at some point.

The Secret of Monkey Island: Special Edition was the first game to be released on InstantAction's embed-tech platform. The game is an enhanced remake of The Secret of Monkey Island developed by LucasArts. It was originally released on July 15, 2009 for the PC, Xbox Live Arcade and iPhone/iPod Touch. On April 29, 2010 InstantAction released a 20-minute demo of the game to show off the companies new embed technology, along with the option to buy the full game for $9.99.

Instant Jam was a music rhythm game similar to Guitar Hero, only in the browser. The game supported 2000 songs at launch, with plans to add more in the months thereafter. Instant Jam scanned the user's hard drive for any songs matching the services own database of note charts, and offered Amazon.com and iTunes links to buy songs they didn't already have. Players could either use their keyboard or Rock Band and Guitar Hero controllers to play. It was shut down the same day InstantAction was and will not return.

== Previous games ==
Screwjumper was a game where players try to get to the bottom of the mine shaft and then escape it after detonating it. The story is that aliens have invaded and as part of the ScrewJumper team, the player needed to help to destroy those mines and thus save the planet. The player had a choice of three different characters playable in 20 different levels (ranging from very easy to very hard) which contained different obstacles as well as bonuses. The game was both single-player and multiplayer and featured 5 modes (although only 4 were available at any point) and eventually dropped to 2 modes.

Cyclomite was an action/puzzle game developed by Wideload Games that was removed in 2008. The game involved rotating a multicolored sphere as meteors of different colors approached it. Players had to align the sphere so that the meteors made contact with the section that was the same color. Ian Tornay (Crash7800) explained why the game was taken off the site in a video podcast, saying that "A lot of the users who tried Cyclomite as their first game didn't stick around."

PlayTribes, Starsiege: Tribes in the browser, was originally planned to release on InstantAction but was canceled when the company sold the Tribes franchise to Hi-Rez Studios.

== Future ==
IAC/InterActiveCorp shut down the InstantAction webpage on November 11, 2010.
