= Hunter Hunted =

Hunter Hunted may refer to:

- Hunter Hunted (band), an indie pop band from Los Angeles
- Hunter Hunted (video game) - a platform computer game released in 1996 by Sierra Entertainment
- Hunter Hunted (TV series) - a documentary series on the National Geographic Channel
- Hunter/Hunted - a 1978 episode of The Professionals
