= Marble It Up! Ultra =

2023 platform game

- Developers: Marble It Up! Shapes & Lines; The Engine Company; Blueteak; The Quantum Astrophysicists Guild; Arcturus Interactive
- Publishers: Marble It Up, LLC; PM Studios
- Designers: Alex Swanson; Calligraphy
- Composer: Solovox
- Engine: Unity
- Platforms: PlayStation 5, PlayStation 4, Nintendo Switch, Xbox One, Xbox Series X/S, Windows, Linux
- Release: August 17, 2023
- Genre: Puzzle-platformer
- Modes: Single-player, multiplayer

Marble It Up! Ultra is a platform game developed by Marble It Up!, Shapes & Lines, The Engine Company, Blueteak, The Quantum Astrophysicists Guild, and Arcturus Interactive. It was published on August 17, 2023 for PlayStation 5, PlayStation 4, Nintendo Switch, Xbox One, Xbox Series X/S, Windows, and Linux. It is the sequel to Marble It Up!. It has new stages, new features and multiplayer. A physical edition for the Switch was published by PM Studios on July 9, 2024.

== Development ==
The game is a spiritual successor to Marble Madness and Marble Blast Ultra. Some members of the development team had worked on games in the Marble Blast series, including Marble Blast Ultra and Marble Blast Gold.

== Reception ==
Marble It Up! Ultra received positive reviews from critics. On Metacritic, the game holds scores of 76/100 for the PlayStation 5 version (based on 6 reviews) and 88/100 for the Xbox Series X/S version (based on 5 reviews).
