= Midair =

Midair or Mid Air could refer to:

== Music ==
- Mid Air (Paris Texas album), 2023
- Mid Air (Romy album), 2023
- Mid Air (Paul Buchanan album), 2012

== Other uses ==
- Midair (video game), 2018
- Midair, former Liberian airline (See list of defunct airlines of Liberia)

== See also ==
- Mid-air collision
- Midair refueling, alternate term for aerial refueling
- Midaircondo, Swedish electronica duo
