= Marble Blast =

2002 video game

- Developers: GarageGames; Monster Studios
- Publishers: GarageGames; Monster Studios eGames
- Engine: Torque
- Platforms: Xbox; Windows; Mac OS X Linux
- Release: December 13, 2002 (Marble Blast); June 24, 2003 (Marble Blaster); May 9, 2003 (Marble Blast Gold); May 10, 2005 (Marble Blast Gold Xbox)
- Genre: Puzzle-platformer
- Mode: Single-player

Marble Blast is a 3D platform game developed by GarageGames and Monster Studios. It was released on December 13, 2002 for Microsoft Windows, and was later made available for Mac OS, various Linux distributions, and Xbox. On June 24, 2003, the game was licensed to eGames to be resold in stores under the name Marble Blaster.

An updated version of the game with added levels and time challenges, titled Marble Blast Gold, was released on May 9, 2003. It came pre-installed on some Apple Inc. computers, such as the iMac, iBook, and Mac mini. Marble Blast Gold was later ported to the Xbox, releasing as a digital download on the Xbox Live Arcade service on May 10, 2005. Despite having the same title as its home computer counterpart, the Xbox port features differences in its level selection in addition to graphical enhancements and new features.

A version for the Net Jet online game system was also released, titled Marble Blast XP. It again added to the game's feature set while also completely overhauling the game's graphical style.

== Gameplay ==
Basic gameplay involves taking control of a marble, viewed from a third person perspective, rolling it from a start pad to a finish pad without falling out of bounds. The player controls the marble’s spin and movement, and can also make the marble jump. The player can control the marble’s spin even in the air, which affects both the marble’s acceleration through the air and its momentum when bouncing off a surface. Levels may contain items that can be collected via collision with the marble, such as gems that need to all be collected before a level can be finished and powerups which apply various temporary effects to the gameplay that are beneficial to the player. Levels may also contain hazards which push the marble out of bounds and special surface types which change how the marble interacts with the ground.

A timer at the top of the screen tracks how long it takes the player to finish a level, and the top fastest times for each level are able to be viewed by the player. Levels may require the player to finish within a time limit to unlock the next one. Marble Blast Gold introduces Gold Times, an optional additional time limit specified for each level. Finishing a level below its Gold Time results in a special indicator on its time leaderboard. Beating a Gold Time usually involves finding hidden powerups and/or taking shortcuts.

The Xbox version of Marble Blast Gold includes additional features such as collectible easter egg items and an online leaderboard, while Marble Blast XP introduces checkpoints which save your progress in the middle of a level, Silver Times (time challenges easier than Gold Times), and selectable marble designs.

== Development and release ==
Marble Blast was developed by GarageGames and Monster Studios, two independent video game companies co-founded by Jeff Tunnell, former head of video game developer Dynamix. It was one of the first games to use GarageGames’ proprietary Torque Game Engine, originally developed by Dynamix for their game Tribes 2. It was developed alongside Monster Studios’ game Chain Reaction, with the two projects sharing development team members and assets. Inspired by Marble Madness and originally envisioned as a multiplayer racing game, development began in the first half of 2002 with the working title Marble Reaction. Multiplayer functionality ended up being cut early in development.

The game was released for Windows on December 13, 2002 as a digital purchase on GarageGames' website, and was made available for Mac and Linux several weeks later.

== Reception ==
Reception

Review scores
Publication	Score
Eurogamer	5/10
Macworld	4/5
Inside Mac Games	6.5

Marble Blast received average reviews from critics.

== Sequel ==
A sequel, Marble Blast Ultra, was released in 2006 for the Xbox 360.

== Modifications ==
In 2007, a modification for Marble Blast was released, called Marble Blast Platinum, which consisted of entirely new levels and improved graphics. Later in the 2017, said modification was released as a standalone game, named PlatinumQuest.
