= CyberGladiators =

1996 fighting video game

- Developer(s): K.A.A.
- Publisher(s): Sierra On-Line
- Director(s): Randy Thompson
- Producer(s): Ken Embery
- Platform(s): Windows 95
- Release: November 18, 1996
- Genre(s): Fighting game

CyberGladiators is a 1996 fighting game developed by K.A.A. (label of Dynamix) and published by Sierra On-Line.

The game is divided of fights between members of the Quaaflax Alliance and members of the terrorist organization Gy Djin. All characters have been transformed by a cosmic storm into CyberGladiators.

== Reception ==
PC Zone gave the game 6.4 out of 10.

== See also ==
- Hunter Hunted, the other game by K.A.A.
