= BoneTown =

2008 video game

- Developer: D-Dub Software
- Publisher: D-Dub Software
- Designers: Hob, JB
- Engine: Torque
- Platform: Microsoft Windows
- Release: November 12, 2008 for Microsoft Windows
- Genre: Action-adventure
- Mode: Single-player

BoneTown is a pornographic action-adventure video game developed and published by American studio D-Dub Software, released for Microsoft Windows on November 12, 2008. The game follows the player as he completes missions and has sex with various women.

== Gameplay ==
The player meets "The Man" in the beginning of the game and the blond who introduces the sexual gameplay mechanics.

BoneTown is an adult video game, in that it is sexually explicit in nature. The premise of the game is that as the player character completes more missions, his testicles become larger; the player is able to have sex with more attractive women as he becomes thinner.

The character wakes up to a fraternity brother urinating onto the player's face; the game then begins with a tutorial explaining how to beat up the brother. A blond woman explains to the player that the point of the game is to have sex with as many women as possible, and then performs fellatio on the player character. After finishing, a man in a suit approaches and explains that he is part of an organization called "The Man". He warns the player that public indecency is illegal and if the player is caught, he will be arrested. The player goes through the game completing missions for various individuals in a style reminiscent of the Grand Theft Auto video games; missions include participating in pornographic films and beating up someone claiming to be Jesus.

The player explores the game's locale, Bonetown, and its various neighborhoods which are sexual puns, such as "Missionary Beach". Women are scattered throughout the city, and the player is able to have sex with any of them; sex can either be for the player's enjoyment, or to recover in-game health, depending on the positions selected. The game requires the player to match the desires of the woman in order to last as long as possible. Temporary power-ups are given through recreational drug use.

== Development ==
BoneTown was developed by Albuquerque-based D-Dub Software, which was founded in 2004 by recent college graduates Hod and JB. Hod stated that they set out to make a game which featured gratuitous sex and drug use but contained no violence; although the game contains weapons and fighting, there is no blood and people are only knocked out, not killed. He called Comedy Central's South Park "our number one influence" for the humor in the game. The company set out to create a new industry and marketing model for adult games as most retailers refuse to sell Adult Only rated games by the ESRB. BoneTown was self-released by D-Dub on November 12, 2008.

== Reception ==
BoneTown received mostly negative reviews for its mediocre gameplay and juvenile humor. GameZone's Mike Splechta stated that the game, "... is essentially an interactive porno that, while is intriguing at first, is limited in scope." The reviewer noted that the game's dry sense of humor would only appeal to certain people. IGN in their "Year in Sex: 2008" summary, called Bonetown "an exploitation game of the first rank" and calls the gameplay mechanics "standard fare".

=== Russia ban ===
On July 25th, 2026, it was announced that the game had been removed from sale on Steam for Russian users by order of the Russian government who requested Steam to remove it.

== Sequel ==
D-Dub Software created a spin-off titled "BoneCraft" which was released in 2012, it follows Captain Fort Worth and his crew the Space Wranglers (accompanied by their sex robots) crash landed in a medieval planet populated by Elves, Orcs and other beings, the team's main mission is to collect 16 pieces of the "Hexa-Deca Force" to unlock the entrance to the Elven Brothel, home of the Elf Queen so the captain has sex with her. The team must dominate each tribe, seduce women, gather allies and battle giant monsters. The game acts as a RPG as well as being a mixture of fantasy and sci-fi, the games mechanics is exactly the same as BoneTown except that you can buy upgrades for combat and sex positions.
