= Marble Blast Ultra =

2006 video game

- Developer: GarageGames
- Publisher: GarageGames
- Designer: Alex Swanson
- Artist: Alex Swanson
- Composer: Tim Clarke
- Engine: Torque Shader Engine
- Platform: Xbox 360 (XBLA)
- Release: January 25, 2006
- Genre: Puzzle-platformer
- Modes: Single-player, multiplayer

Marble Blast Ultra is a platform game developed by GarageGames. It was released on January 25, 2006 for the Xbox 360 via Xbox Live Arcade. It is the sequel to Marble Blast Gold. It features 60 levels, enhanced graphics, 2 new power-ups and a multiplayer mode. A browser port of the game under the title Marble Blast Online was released on March 7, 2008, and was available at InstantAction until the website was shut down.

== Gameplay ==
In Marble Blast Ultra, players navigate a marble through obstacles and gaps to reach the finish in sixty levels.

In the single-player mode, the player has the main goal of reaching the finish pad of the level as fast as possible while playing as a marble. Obstacles will hinder the player's progress, but powerups are also provided to help the player finish the level. There are sixty single player levels that can be completed by the player. They are divided into Beginner, Intermediate, and Advanced Levels, each category containing twenty levels. Many of these levels (such as 'Survival of the Fittest', 'Natural Selection', and 'Ordeal') are recycled from Marble Blast Gold.

There is a par time set for each of the levels, and if the player beats the level under par time, the player will earn achievements based on how many levels they successfully completed under par time. Additionally, if the player has an Xbox Live connection, their best time will show on a leaderboard where players worldwide can compare their best times. The leaderboard is updated whenever a player gets a new record time.

The game makes use of two new power-ups:

- Ultra Blast - instantly increases the blast meter, and adds more power. The marble can jump much higher than it can with a normal blast.
- Mega Marble - makes the marble bigger, allowing it to knock other marbles off-course. The power-up lasts at least 10 seconds before the marble shrinks back to normal.

Another added feature is the introduction of Easter Eggs, which are found in hidden locations in 20 of the game's 60 levels. After finding one Easter Egg, the game will award the achievement "Egg Seeker". After finding all 20 Easter Eggs, the game will award the "Egg Basket" achievement.

=== Multiplayer ===
Multiplayer mode contains 20 levels and supports up to 8 simultaneous players. There is only one mode which consists of collecting gems within a certain time limit (three to six minutes), which depends on the level. After a group of 2-6 gems are collected entirely, another set of gems appear elsewhere on the board. Players race to these gems and use power-ups to navigate across the level quicker and interfere with other players.

There are three types of gems: red, yellow, and blue. Red gems are worth one point, while yellows are worth two and blues are worth five. Most likely, blue and yellow gems are much harder to get than the red ones. The player at the end of the round with the most points wins. Players can change their marble's appearance by choosing from a variety of patterns and pictures in the main menu, such as a globe marble or a tiger marble as well as adding several different effects to use online. Ranked matches and player matches are supported along with an overall multiplayer leaderboard for ranked and player matches. Users can create a game or join one and filter parameters such as level, players, and gamer zone. Private games are also supported.

== Development and marketing ==
Early in the development of the Xbox 360, Microsoft approached GarageGames to help with developing games for Xbox Live Arcade. After receiving pre-release Alpha hardware, GarageGames quickly ported Torque Shader Engine to the platform. The developers of Marble Blast Ultra also began working on the PC to bring the core game over to the new engine, taking six months to develop the game in total.

In December 2007, Marble Blast Ultra had its price lowered. In 2008, three new achievements totaling 50 gamerscore were added to Marble Blast Ultra on Xbox.com. Three DLC packs were released for the game during that year. On October 29, a DLC pack contained a new multiplayer level "Marble It Up". In December, the Marble-Fu map pack and Agoraphobia pack were released. Each pack contained five maps and was available on InstantAction prior to their Xbox 360 release.

== Reception ==
Reception

Aggregate score
Aggregator	Score
Metacritic	79/100

Review scores
Publication	Score
Eurogamer	8/10
GameSpot	6.8/10
IGN	6.9/10
Jeuxvideo.com	15/20
Official Xbox Magazine (US)	8.5/10
PALGN	7/10
Retro Gamer	91%
TeamXbox	8.7/10
Detroit Free Press	4/4

The Xbox 360 version received "generally favorable reviews" according to the review aggregation website Metacritic. IGN gave it an average review over a month before its worldwide release date.

Since its release, the game sold 756,178 units worldwide by January 2011.

== Legacy ==
Marble Blast Ultra was delisted from the Xbox Live Arcade service in February 2011. GarageGames, now a subsidiary of Graham Software Development, retained the rights to the Torque Engine which powers Marble Blast Ultra, but not the rights to the game. Game rights are property of InstantAction Holdings. GarageGames CEO Eric Preisz said that it was "unlikely" that the studio would reacquire the rights to its games.

The members of the development team later worked on a spiritual successor, Marble It Up!, which was released for the Nintendo Switch in September 2018 and subsequently for Windows and Apple Arcade.

A sequel to Marble It Up!, Marble It Up! Ultra was released for PlayStation 5, PlayStation 4, Nintendo Switch, Xbox Series X/S, Windows, Linux, and Xbox One in July 2023.

== See also ==
- Marble Madness
- Switchball
- Super Monkey Ball series
- Neverball
