= Blockland (video game) =

- Developers: Eric "Badspot" Hartman, Anthony "Rotondo" Rotondo, Ben "kompressor" Garney
- Publishers: Step 1 Games LLC & Blockland LLC
- Designer: Eric "Badspot" Hartman
- Engine: Torque Game Engine
- Platform: Windows
- Release: November 15, 2004 (freeware); February 24, 2007 (retail); December 16, 2013 (Steam)
- Genre: Sandbox
- Modes: Single-player, multiplayer

Blockland is a sandbox game in which players build and play using Lego-like building blocks in singleplayer and multiplayer modes. It was created by American developer Eric "Badspot" Hartman, using the Torque Game Engine, and was originally released as freeware on November 15, 2004. The game is not endorsed by, or affiliated with, the Lego brand, but at one point, Lego was in talks with Hartman about purchasing the game.

Blockland was spotlighted on The Screen Savers on February 11, 2005, drastically increasing the user base overnight. It has also been featured on Shack News. Blockland was officially released on February 24, 2007. It was released on Steam in December 2013 after spending nearly a year on Steam Greenlight.

== Gameplay ==
Blockland is an open-ended sandbox game, giving players the freedom to design and construct elaborate structures. Styled as a minifigure, players build inside of the virtual world using bricks reminiscent of toy blocks. These structures can be built in either a single-player or multiplayer server. Any player who buys the game is able to host a standard server, holding up to 100 players.

The properties of individual bricks can be changed, such as illumination, particles, and specularity. Blockland features non-player characters, weapons, destructible vehicles, and a minigame system, enabling users to create new self-contained gameplay modes. These can range from deathmatch to full games-within-a-game, such as role-playing video game, or zombie survival. Blockland features a trigger and event-based system to create basic interactive objects, such as operable light switches, missile launchers, collapsing structures, or arcade games such as Pong or Breakout. Blockland has a large community of player-created add-on content, such as gamemodes, vehicles, and specialty bricks.

== Development ==
A prototype version of Blockland known as 'Vanilla Blockland' was developed in the Torque Game Engine and released on November 15, 2004. Canadian newspaper The Globe and Mail wrote an article on this early version of Blockland, in which creator Eric "Badspot" Hartman claimed the game had gained 20,000 users in the ten days since it "became big", after being featured on The Screen Savers. The retail version of Blockland was completed and released on February 24, 2007. A new version was released in August 2012, removing terrain but adding more dynamic lighting to builds. The game was greenlit on Steam Greenlight in August 2013, and on December 16, Blockland was released on Steam after spending nearly a year on Steam Greenlight.

=== Shadows and Shaders ===
Included in the game on August 9, 2012, an update called "Shadows and Shaders" (also known as Version 21) removed the game's traditional 'maps' - open-world terrain - replacing them with a flat field. GLSL shadows and shaders were added, along with customizable skyboxes, and a day/night cycle. Additionally, it provided users with the ability to make custom shader files.
