= Matthew Mather =

Canadian writer of science fiction

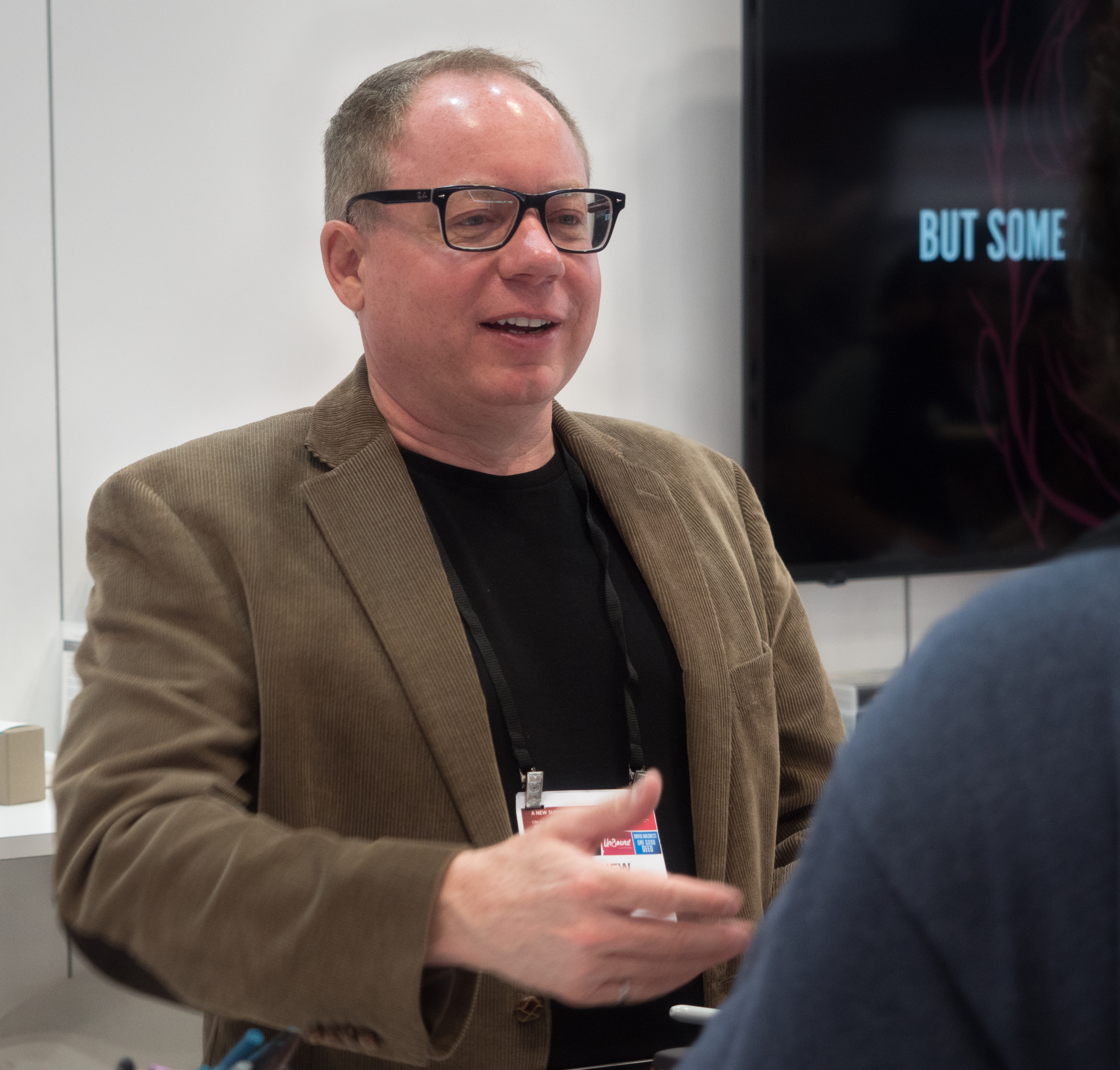
- Mather at BookCon in June 2019
- Born: September 28, 1969; Sheffield, United Kingdom
- Died: September 13, 2022 (aged 52)
- Education: McGill University
- Occupations: Writer, Novelist
- Writing career
- Period: 2013–2022
- Genre: Science fiction
- Notable work: Cyberstorm
- Website: www.matthewmather.com

Matthew Mather (September 28, 1969 – September 13, 2022) was a Canadian writer of science fiction. His books have been translated into eighteen languages and sold around the world. He was also a self-publishing author of his works, as well as being published through HarperCollins and 47North among others. He is best known as the author of Cyberstorm which has been bought by 20th Century Fox to turn it into a movie.

== Background ==
Prior to becoming a bestselling author he worked at McGill Center for Intelligent Machines. He also worked in cybersecurity, nanotechnology, electronic health records, and weather prediction. Mather was born in Sheffield, United Kingdom, though his family now lives in North Carolina. He was raised in Montreal and used to "divide[s] his time between Montreal and Charlotte, North Carolina."

== Works ==
Matthew Mather was the author of a growing collection of work, often in the genre of apocalyptic and science fiction, but also in thriller and mystery/suspense.

=== Stand-alone novels ===
- Darknet (2015) is a dystopian novel that follows Jake O'Connell a New York City stockbroker who is hunted by an artificial intelligence. The AI system has found a way to interact with the real world using darknets, assassination markets, virtual currencies and advanced chatbots. It is claimed that this book is "based on real-world technologies".
- Polar Vortex (2019)

=== Atopia ===
- The Atopia Chronicles (2012)
- The Dystopia Chronicles (2014)
- The Utopia Chronicles (2017)

=== Cyberstorm/World War C ===
- Cyberstorm (2013) follows Mike Mitchel a resident of New York City who is trying to keep his family together is thrust into a new problems of staying alive. A massive snowstorm strikes the East Coast of the United States during an unknown cyber attack from unknown source(s). Mike Mitchel must work to keep his family and friends safe as the winter storm and the cyber storm drag on.
- Cyberspace (2020)
- Cyberwar (2021)

=== Nomad/The New Earth ===
- Nomad (2015)
- Sanctuary (2015)
- Resistance (2016) (Written with Lucas Bale)
- Destiny (2017) (Written with Lucas Bale)

=== Delta Devlin ===
- The Dreaming Tree (2019)
- Meet Your Maker (2020)
- Out of Time (2021)

=== Aeon ===
- Aeon Rising: The Apocalypse Begins (2022)
- Aeon Burn (not published yet, expected September 26, 2023)
- Aeon Fury (not published yet, expected September 24, 2024 as published on Amazon)

=== Other works ===
- The Robot Chronicles (The Future Chronicles) (2014) is a science fiction anthology by thirteen top science fiction writers, including Matthew Mather.
- Compendium is a free eBook that includes three short stories by Matthew Mather and the first chapters of some of his best-selling novels. It's available through his website by joining his Reader Group.

== Reception ==
"In just four years from publishing his first novel, Matthew Mather's books have sold over a million copies and been translated into eighteen languages and published in 23 countries, with 20th Century Fox developing his second novel, CyberStorm, for film."

== Death ==
Mather's death in a car accident on September 13, 2022, was announced by family and friends in late September 2022.

== Bibliography ==
1. Cyberstorm (2013) ISBN 0-9916771-9-6
2. The Atopia Chronicles (Atopia Series) (January 7, 2014) ISBN 1-4778-4928-9
3. The Robot Chronicles (July 23, 2014) ISBN 1-5006-0062-8
4. The Dystopia Chronicles (Atopia Series) (August 12, 2014) ISBN 1-4778-2453-7
5. Darknet (March 4, 2015) ISBN 1-987942-00-0
6. Nomad (August 12, 2015) ISBN 1-987942-04-3
7. Sanctuary (February 20, 2016) ISBN 1-987942-06-X
8. Polar Vortex (2018) ISBN 978-1-987942-09-5
