= Tribes 3: Rivals =

- Developer: Prophecy Games
- Publisher: Prophecy Games
- Designer: Erez Goren
- Programmer: Mick Larkins
- Series: Tribes
- Engine: Unreal Engine 5
- Platform: Microsoft Windows
- Release: Q1 2024
- Genre: First-person shooter
- Mode: Multiplayer

Tribes 3: Rivals is a first-person shooter developed and published by Prophecy Games for Microsoft Windows, as part of the Tribes series. On March 12, 2024, it launched into Early Access on Steam. Since the release of its Early Access, it has failed to reach a thousand players and is currently struggling to maintain a concurrent player count of a few hundred. On June 27, Prophecy posted an announcement on Steam stating that neither Tribes 3 nor Starsiege: Deadzone "had enough success yet to support the studio" and that updating the game would no longer be Prophecy's main focus.
