= Minions of Mirth =

2005 video game

- Developers: Prairie Games, Inc.
- Publishers: Prairie Games, Inc.
- Engine: Torque
- Platforms: Mac OS X, Microsoft Windows
- Release: December 2005
- Genre: MMORPG
- Modes: Multiplayer, Single Player

Minions of Mirth is a role-playing game for Mac OS X and Microsoft Windows by American studio Prairie Games, Inc. The game includes both a single-player and a massively multi-player mode. There were two editions of the game: a free version and a paid version which opened additional character abilities.

It was written and produced by Josh Ritter and Lara Engebretson from 2003, with a launch in December 2005. Online servers from Prairies Games ceased in September 2017, due to a hard drive failure; the official servers closed on 22 September 2017, but single-player and at least one private server still run.
