= Metaltech: Earthsiege =

1994 video game

- Developer: Dynamix
- Publisher: Sierra On-Line
- Producer: Mark Crowe
- Designers: Mark Crowe; David Selle
- Programmer: Paul Bowman
- Artist: Robert Caracol
- Composers: Timothy Steven Clarke; Christopher Stevens
- Platform: MS-DOS
- Release: NA: October 25, 1994; EU/AU: 1994
- Genre: Simulation
- Mode: Single-player

Metaltech: Earthsiege is a mech simulation game developed by Dynamix and released in 1994 for MS-DOS. Players are placed in the cockpit of various massive bipedal war machines known as Herculans (Humaniform-Emulation Roboticized Combat Unit with Leg-Articulated Navigation) (or 'HERCs' for short). Set in the 25th or 26th century, Earthsiege is a technologically advanced setting with many futuristic weapons and vehicles.

Earthsiege is the first in a series of video games in the Metaltech universe, which contains Earthsiege 2 (1996) and Metaltech: Battledrome (1994), as well as the strategy games MissionForce: CyberStorm (1996) and Cyberstorm 2: Corporate Wars (1998), direct sequel mecha-simulation Starsiege (1999), and first-person shooters Starsiege: Tribes (1998), Tribes 2 (2001), Tribes: Aerial Assault (2002) Tribes: Vengeance (2004) and Tribes: Ascend (2012). In 2015, Earthsiege was released as freeware by Hi-Rez Studios.

== Plot ==
On November 29, 2471, the race for true artificial intelligence ended when Sentinel Cybertronix activated Project: Prometheus. Prometheus was a prototype, the first cybernetic-hybrid machine, or Cybrid. The mass production of these Cybrids and their use for war, to the point of nuclear war devastated Earth's population. In the aftermath, the Cybrids turned against their human creators, forcing the humans into hiding. Twenty years later, the humans started their own resistance. Using hit-and-run tactics against the machines, the humans managed to survive and even capture Cybrid weapons and equipment.

== Gameplay ==
Inside the cockpit of a Colossus

Gameplay in Earthsiege consists of piloting the mecha-style HERCs in combat against opposing HERCs. The HERC can be steered with a keyboard or joystick, though some controls are only found on the keyboard. The mouse can be used to interact with the various buttons in the cockpit. The whole game has at minimum of 5 campaigns of about 7 missions each. Success and failure of the missions might trigger secondary missions and campaigns to rectify previous failures, all in all resulting in 45 missions in 8 campaigns.

HERCs battle with various ranged and projectile weapons, including lasers, missiles, and autocannons. They offer rechargeable shields and armor plating for defense. When the shields are depleted, armor begins taking damage; when armor is low, internal components, weapons and even limbs can be destroyed. A HERC that has lost a leg is immediately incapacitated, leaving more salvage (in the form of scrap metal and weapons) for the player.

Outside of battle, the player manages their squad's HERCs and resources. The player selects the weapons mounted on each HERC, and can repair existing HERCs and weapons (as well as build new ones with scrap metal). Additionally, the player can bring up to three squad mates along on missions. Squad mates can be assigned HERCs before the mission begins, and during a mission they can be issued basic orders. As squad mates complete more missions, their skills and rank rise.

== Expansion packs ==
In 1994, a speech pack was released for Earthsiege. It adds digitized speech for some characters. The CD-ROM version was released with this feature. In 1995, an expansion pack for Earthsiege was released featuring a full-motion video introduction. The expansion pits humanity against a second wave of Cybrid attackers 3 months after the end of the original game. The expansion pack featured new content such as new vehicles and weapons.

== Reception ==
Reception

Review scores
Publication	Score
Computer Gaming World	2.5/5
Next Generation	4/5

Computer Gaming World rated the game as "the best attempt yet at creating a futuristic simulation of giant armored combat", praising the graphics and animation. They did, however, pan the game's overly difficult missions, consequence-free mission failure, and a host of "tiny, but irritating, glitches and questionable design decisions."

Next Generation reviewed the PC version of the game, rating it four stars out of five, and stated "Without a doubt, the finest mech simulator available."
