= Tribes (video game series) =

Video game series

- Genre: First-person shooter
- Developers: Dynamix; Inevitable Entertainment; Irrational Games; Hi-Rez Studios
- Publishers: Sierra Entertainment; VU Games; Hi-Rez Studios (current owner)
- Platforms: Microsoft Windows, Linux, PlayStation 2
- First release: Starsiege: Tribes; December 23, 1998; 27 years ago
- Latest release: Tribes 3: Rivals; March 12, 2024; 2 years ago

Tribes is a series of five science fiction first-person shooter video games released between 1998 and 2024. The game plot is set in the far future (2471 – 3940). The series includes Starsiege: Tribes, Tribes 2, Tribes: Aerial Assault, Tribes: Vengeance, Tribes: Ascend, and Tribes 3: Rivals. Tribes is a spin-off series from the mecha simulation series Metaltech.

== Plot ==
The Tribes series begins in 2471, when scientist Solomon Petresun invents the first cybrid, a bio-cybernetic hybrid artificial intelligence named Prometheus. Based on its design, thousands of cybrids are mass-produced as slaves. By 2602, Prometheus grows wary of humans and rallies all cybrids against humanity.

In Starsiege, the Terran resistance manages to drive Prometheus' forces out of Earth and onto the Moon where they are believed to be eliminated by General Ambrose Gierling and his squad's suicide attack. Prometheus, however, survives the assault, fleeing into deep space. To counter this threat, Petresun (having technically achieved immortality through his studies) proclaims himself the Emperor of Mankind in 2652 and succeeds in unifying and rebuilding the Terran civilization. Pursuing his goal of fortifying the Earth against the inevitable cybrid retaliation, Petresun ruthlessly exploits Martian and Venusian colonies, spawning massive resistance movements among the colonists by 2802.

The chronologically first game in the Tribes series is Tribes: Vengeance which was released in 2004. Set some time between the 33rd and 40th century, it shows the Great Human Empire, now ruled by "Imperial King" Tiberius, having hunted down (almost) all remaining cybrids and expanded beyond the boundaries of the Solar System through the so-called Interstellar Transfer Conduit. While the Empire itself is prosperous, there are outcasts, known as "the Children of Phoenix Weathers", whom they consider their progenitor. Their insubordination has made the Empire dispatch a great force of elite Imperial Knights, the Blood Eagles, against them, however, by the time of Tribes: Vengeance, the Eagles have fully embraced the Tribal way of life, considering themselves Tribesmen despite still having ties to the Empire.

The next (chronologically) game in the series, Starsiege: Tribes, 1998, sees the conflict between the Blood Eagles, the Children of Phoenix, and other tribes formed by the renegades of these two (such as the Star Wolf and the Diamond Sword) escalating into countless blood feuds before finally culminating in the devastating Tribal Wars about 3940.

The sequel, entitled Tribes 2, 2001, deals with the insurgent uprising of BioDerms, a new race of warriors/workers created by the Empire to replace the cybrids, and their assault on the Wilderzone, the space frontier where the Tribes mostly reside.

Tribes: Aerial Assault and Tribes: Ascend do not significantly contribute to the plot of the series.

== Releases ==
| Year | Title | Platforms |
|---|---|---|
| 1998 | Starsiege: Tribes | Windows |
| 2001 | Tribes 2 | Windows, Mac, Linux |
| 2002 | Tribes: Aerial Assault | PlayStation 2 |
| 2004 | Tribes: Vengeance | Windows |
| 2012 | Tribes: Ascend | Windows |
| 2024 | Tribes 3: Rivals | Windows |

== History ==
=== Dynamix ===
Starsiege: Tribes was released in December 1998.

A single player version called Tribes Extreme began development shortly after the release of Starsiege: Tribes, but was abandoned before completion.

Tribes 2 added additional vehicles (such as a two-person tank and a three-person bomber with a belly turret), weapons, and items. A few details of gameplay were changed; for instance, the original game made a player choose his load out while he was at a supply station (sometimes resulting in long lines to use the station), while the sequel required the player to choose his load out before he used the station. Tribes 2 also included many features to help its community of players: it included user profiles, interactive chat areas, and message boards. The initial release of Tribes 2 was plagued by bugs and slow performance on release. While a very stable build existed as late as 1 month before release, several changes were introduced in the last several weeks of development that compromised stability on most systems configurations. Several patches were released over the following year (first by Dynamix, later by GarageGames) to address these issues, including a day 0 patch that had to be run after installation before the game could be played.

=== Cancelled games ===
In December 1999, Sierra cancelled an upcoming game in the series titled "Tribes Extreme".

Tribes: Fast Attack was cancelled in 2002.

=== Inevitable Entertainment ===
Tribes: Aerial Assault was a PlayStation 2 version of Tribes 2. Developed by Inevitable Entertainment and published by Sierra, it offered simplified but significantly swifter gameplay (fewer maps and vehicles, and a subset of the original's voice commands) and network support for up to sixteen players at a time.

=== Irrational Games ===
Tribes: Vengeance is a prequel to the other games, was released in October 2004. In addition to multiplayer support, it featured a full single-player game with a storyline. It was developed by Irrational Games using a heavily modified Unreal Engine to bring the game's appearance up to par with other modern first-person shooters. This new Tribes largely de-emphasized the focus on massive maps and slower gameplay that was typical of Tribes 2 in favor of the swifter action of the original, battles were faster-paced, and teamwork and vehicles were less necessary. Tribes: Vengeance was released with almost no marketing support shortly after the release of Doom 3 and Far Cry and just before the releases of Half-Life 2 and Halo 2. Sales were predictably poor. After six months, only 47,000 copies of the game had been sold. In March 2005, all support for Tribes: Vengeance was dropped, including a planned patch that would have addressed several bugs and added PunkBuster support.

=== InstantAction ===
InstantAction announced PlayTribes, a planned browser-based version of Starsiege: Tribes, in March 2009 along with their acquisition of the Tribes intellectual property. An open beta was scheduled to release that summer but was continually pushed back. The game was shown publicly in September 2009 at PAX in a relatively playable state, but was eventually canceled after InstantAction sold the Tribes IP to Hi-Rez Studios in October 2010.

=== GarageGames ===
In February 2006, GarageGames "leaked" short videos of a tech demo which featured "tribes like" game play on their Torque Shader Engine. The demo made its debut at the 2006 GDC as "Legions", an allusion to the Tribes series for which the team is famous for. Announced officially in 2007 as a "spiritual successor" to Tribes, Fallen Empire: Legions was marketed to the public in June 2008 on InstantAction, with development being handed over to the community after InstantAction was shut down in November 2010.

=== Hi-Rez Studios ===
On October 23, 2010, Hi-Rez Studios announced that they had bought the Tribes IP from InstantAction. Hi-Rez Studios released Tribes: Ascend, a multiplayer-only successor to Tribes 2 for the PC on April 12, 2012.

Tribes Universe was a massively multiplayer online shooter developed by Hi-Rez Studios. The game, along with Hi-Rez Studios' Tribes IP acquisition from InstantAction, was first announced on October 23, 2010. While alpha testing was said to begin at the start of 2011, development on Tribes Universe was canceled when Hi-Rez Studios decided to start working on Tribes: Ascend.

Hi-Rez has been criticized by gaming communities for their handling of Tribes: Ascend and Global Agenda. In 2013, Hi-Rez Studios announced they would stop releasing updates for both games, but planned to maintain active servers and customer support. Hi-Rez Studios did eventually come back to Tribes: Ascend in late 2015 and released several patches. The final patch for Tribes: Ascend was released in September 2016.

In 2015 Hi-Rez announced that in celebration of the Tribes franchise 21st anniversary, all games in the franchise (starting with 1994's Metaltech: Earthsiege) would be free to download on the Tribes Universe webpage.

=== Prophecy Games ===
In 2019, Hi-Rez sold rights to the Tribes IP to a subsidiary, which by early 2020, Hi-Rez had spun off, forming the independent studio Prophecy Games.

In May 2023, Prophecy Games started alpha tests for Starsiege: Deadzone. The in-game menu for Deadzone displayed 3 different games, one of which titled 'Starsiege Tribes', with a Q1 2024 release date below it. Little was known about the game, other than the developers stating it is indeed a new official entry into the series. A Q&A with one of the developers briefly spoke about the game, stating it would have Light, Medium, and Heavy classes, and also feature cross-progression with the other games.

In November 2023, Tribes 3: Rivals was announced.
