= Instant Jam =

2010 video game

- Developer: InstantAction
- Platform: Browser
- Release: August 16, 2010
- Genre: Rhythm game
- Mode: Single-player

Instant Jam was a rhythm video game developed by InstantAction. It was released for browsers through Facebook and the company's official site on August 16, 2010. In November 2010, InstantAction ceased all operations, shutting down the game in the process.

== Gameplay ==
The basic premise of Instant Jam was very similar to other music games, such as Guitar Hero and Rock Band. The players must hit the correct keys or buttons at the right time during a song. However, no risk of failing the sequence was present. There was no score for the missed notes, and the song would start to fade away.

The game was able to scan personal song collections on the player's hard drives, and match them up with entries stored in the database. Instant Jam's playlist gave the option to buy each missing song from Amazon or the iTunes stores. Only three songs were free to try at the beginning, with each new chance appearing after thirty minutes. By playing, the game would award fans, which would level up their accounts to unlock more of the in-game's store. The extra items that were available included various guitars, fretboards, backgrounds and special abilities. The players were able to send challenges to each other to compete at. Instant Jam supported both keyboard and USB guitar controllers, specifically Guitar Hero and Rock Band guitars.

== Development ==
InstantAction created the note system for every particular arrangement, in order to provide as accurate experience of playing the guitar as possible. As an initial reference point, the team decided to use every song that appeared in Billboard Top 100 from the past twenty years. The game uses the internally developed InstantAction 3D engine, designed to make use of the device's hardware for rendering.
