= Hunter Hunted (video game) =

1996 side-scrolling action computer game released by Sierra On-Line

- Developer: K.A.A.
- Publisher: Sierra On-Line
- Director: Chris Cole
- Producer: Ken Embery
- Designer: Chris Cole
- Programmer: Richard Rayl
- Artists: Michael Backus, Brian Hahn
- Composer: Loudmouth
- Platform: Microsoft Windows
- Release: November 8, 1996
- Genres: Run and gun, Platform game
- Modes: Single-player, multiplayer

Hunter Hunted is a side-scrolling action computer game developed by K.A.A. (label of Dynamix) and published by Sierra On-Line on November 8, 1996. The player controls a humanoid creature (either a muscular human called Jake or a minotaur-like creature named Garathe Den) who fights enemies, completes objectives, and tries to find the hidden exit in each level. Of the two, Garathe possesses superior strength and stamina, while Jake can take advantage of more sophisticated weaponry.

== Story ==
The game is set in 2015, years after Earth is invaded by a race of technologically superior alien warriors known as the Masters. Following the rapid invasion of Earth by the alien race, the vast majority of humanity is exterminated, and the few survivors are enslaved and forced to fight in the ruins of Earth's cities for the entertainment of the Masters. A fictional planet Kullrathe is also invaded by the Masters, and its Minotaur-like inhabitants there are herded into concentration camps, then also forced to play the "Hunter Hunted" game for the entertainment of the aliens.

Scattered deep in the battle arenas are car parts which the game's two protagonists, Jake and Garathe Den, try to salvage, in order to construct a working vehicle and escape the Masters. The nature of Garathe and Jake's relationship is unclear in the game, as in some of the game's videos it appears that Garathe is hunting Jake down, and yet they appear to escape together in the hover car when all the car parts are found.

The story of Hunter-Hunted was tied into the Metaltech: Earthsiege universe as a prequel of sorts. While Hunter-Hunted and the first two Earthsiege games make little or no reference to each other, the storyline for Starsiege retroactively makes Hunter-Hunted a major part of the backstory. While most of the reference to story based on Hunter-Hunted is just found in the printed companion materials, several game characters reference the religious figure "Jake Hunter", who (according to followers) saved humanity from a race of aliens.

== Gameplay ==
An in-game screenshot featuring Jake and a few kinds of monsters. A few bonuses and a passable door to another plane can be seen upstairs.

The game can be played by either one or two players: it has 65 single-player missions and 35 multiplayer missions (20 head-to-head missions and 15 cooperative missions). An optional add-on provides 15 new single-player missions, two new head-to-head missions, and three more cooperative missions. In total, there are 120 missions in the game.

The missions can be completed in any order, the traditional ascending one just takes fewer clicks to go. Also, the first few missions are tutorials that provide some tips.

Missions fall into two major groups: "Hunter" and "Hunted". "Hunter" missions feature slaying numerous monsters with good amount of ammunition, while "Hunted" ones emphasize staying alive with limited resources while facing dangers like numerous obstacles or AI hunters.

Like many side-scrolling games of the time, most levels consist of several parallel planes that the player character can move between. The player character can move between rooms through doors or windows.

Player characters can press against walls to avoid incoming projectiles, just like in Blackthorne. AI-controlled human and minotaur opponents can do the same.

== Reception ==
Reception

Review scores
Publication	Score
GameSpot	7/10
Next Generation	3/5

The game was met with moderately positive reviews. Chris Hudak of GameSpot praised the ability to move between multiple planes, the sound effects, and the soundtrack. He found that the game did not quite revolutionize the sidescrolling shooter genre but was "a level-hopping step in the right direction." A Next Generation critic called it "a strong showing in the world of side-scrolling platform shooters", citing the level designs, the native support for cutting-edge gamepads, and the replayability offered by the multiplayer mode. However, he warned that the controls are "a bit sticky" and do not offer the level of control typical of console games in the same genre.

== See also ==
- CyberGladiators, the other game by K.A.A.
