= Cyberstorm (novel) =

2013 novel by Matthew Mather

- First book edition
- Author: Matthew Mather
- Cover artist: Vaseem Baig
- Language: English
- Genre: Science fiction
- Published: March 15, 2013
- Publication place: United States
- Media type: Print (paperback, ebook)
- Pages: 362
- ISBN: 0991677196

Cyberstorm is a science fiction novel by Canadian author Matthew Mather. It follows Mike Mitchel, a resident of New York City, who tries to keep his family together while society grinds to a standstill. Mike watches as logistical systems crumble beneath him with almost no warning just as a major blizzard hits the East Coast. Mike Mitchel must work to keep his family and friends safe as the winter storm and the cyberstorm drag on.

== Plot ==
The novel is set in current day New York City, New York. The main character is Mike Mitchel, a successful businessman living in New York City married into a family of wealth and power. He lives with his wife and his son in Manhattan, next door to Chuck, a close friend and doomsday prepper. Chuck has a bugout location in Virginia.

At the start of the book, Mike and his family are a normal American family, going to work and school. However, things start to fall apart when logistic systems for the main shipping companies grind to a standstill. Soon cell services go down and news starts reporting that bird flu has been reported. Then the power goes out, and widespread panic ensues.

As a blizzard sets in, Mike walks in on Chuck and his wife talking about leaving New York City to their bugout location in the woods. They decide they will not do so without taking their friends, including Mike.

At this time, Mike's son is not feeling well, and Richard, who Mike fears his wife might be having an affair with, offers to allow their driver to take them to a hospital. They find the hospital flooded with sick patients, and the same story pans out at multiple other hospitals across the city. They eventually have their son admitted into a hospital, but they are unable to see a doctor.

The families struggle with the problems of living in a large city depending on daily shipments of goods and food. Even with Chuck's prepping skills, both Chuck and Mike find it necessary to gather supplies before things get too bad. But with all logistical systems down, computerized cash registers cannot accept payment in credit or cash, so there is no way to legitimately buy food. As the blizzard sets in and stores close their doors, desperate looters break in and steal what they can. Chuck and Mike do the same, though they only do "polite looting": only looting stores which others had already broken into.

The winter storm drags on, burying roads in snow, and Chuck and Mike are stuck inside their apartment complex. The heating system gives out and is unable to be fixed, and the apartment becomes an isolated group of floor communities. As every major system around them breaks, residents reserve certain floors for toiletries until they are left to defecate on the floors. Floor communities gather and distribute food and resources. Chuck has his own generator that he uses to heat rooms and charge phones. But supplies still run low, and Chuck and Mike eventually decide that they have to leave, and the truck can only fit so many people. Chuck and Mike decide that their resources are only for them and their families, and that the rest of the apartment would just have to find a way to go about finding their own food. It will later be implied that some of the other floors have resorted to cannibalism.

Outside their apartment, a New York teenager develops a peer-to-peer mesh network messaging service that bypasses cell towers. As the winter storm continues, this messaging app begins to catch on and becomes a primary method of communication.

Chuck and Mike eventually manage to escape with their families and get on Chuck's pickup truck, headed for his bugout in Virginia. They find it looted, and they suspect that a nearby family had broken in and stolen Chuck's supplies. They decide to get revenge by breaking into their bugout as well, only to find it deserted and empty as well. After they return, Mike decides to trek on foot all the way across the I95 to Washington, DC to try to seek help, only to find DC occupied by Chinese troops. In desperation and shock at what has occurred to his country, he is left with no choice but to try to flee back to the bugout. The bugout is eventually found by Chinese troops.

The book then concludes, revealing that the Chinese troops were not opportunistic occupants, but rather one of several relief forces the government had called in. The soldier who Mike had seen was of Japanese descent, not Chinese. It describes how a Russian cyber operation intended to siphon funds from a Connecticut-based hedgefund became a nationwide virus.

== Film adaptation ==
A movie adaptation is currently in development.
