= GarageGames =

American video game developer

- Type: Limited liability company
- Industry: Computer software video games
- Founded: Eugene, Oregon, U.S. (2000)
- Founder: Jeff Tunnell; Tim Gift; Rick Overman; Mark Frohnmayer
- Defunct: 2022
- Headquarters: Vancouver, WA, U.S.
- Area served: Worldwide
- Key people: Eric Preisz (CEO)
- Products: Torque 3D; Torque 2D; Torque X
- Website: web.archive.org/web/20220415052120/http://www.garagegames.com/

GarageGames was a game technology and software developer. GarageGames was the parent company of GG Interactive, developers of educational technology in the areas of computer science, video game development and programming. In addition, the company has been a video game developer and publisher. GarageGames created several game engines targeted for indie development. Founded in Eugene, Oregon, the company had offices in Las Vegas, Nevada, United States and its headquarters in Vancouver, Washington. In 2007, GarageGames was acquired by IAC and the company was renamed TorquePowered. In 2011, the company was purchased by Graham Software Development and reverted to the original name GarageGames.

== History ==
GarageGames was founded in Eugene, Oregon in 2000 by Jeff Tunnell, Tim Gift, Rick Overman, and Mark Frohnmayer. Working in their garage on severance checks, the founders derived the name GarageGames as a play off the term "garage band", and is meant to evoke a similar attitude in game development. The stated goal of the original founders of GarageGames was to offer licensing of game engines to virtually anyone, allowing independent game-makers more options in developing and publishing video games. In 2001, GarageGames released the Torque game engine. It was used to create the Tribes game series and was released at an initial price point to allow independent game developers access. Later the company expanded its product lines with additional tools, and more advanced engines and introduced tiered licensing. In 2005, the company introduced Enterprise licenses for large companies and educational institutions available for annual fees ranging from tens of thousands to hundreds of thousands of dollars per year. In 2006, its developer community surpassed 100,000 users. Over its history, the company launched several of its own games, including Marble Blast Ultra for Microsoft Windows and Xbox Live Arcade.

In 2006, GarageGames acquired BraveTree Technologies, developers of Think Tanks and real-time networked multiplayer physics technology. In 2007, Barry Diller and InterActive Corporation (NASD: IACI) acquired a majority interest in GarageGames for an estimated $80–100M in cash and renamed the company InstantAction. InterActive Corporation later bought out the remainder of GarageGames' equity for an undisclosed sum and on July 15, 2009, Louis Castle, notable for his Command & Conquer series, would become the CEO of GarageGames and InstantAction. The company headquarters were moved to Las Vegas and some employees relocated to Portland, Oregon. Shortly after the move, the "GarageGames" brand was retired.

On November 11, 2010 it was announced that IAC was shutting down InstantAction, and the intellectual property for the Torque game engine would be sold off. On January 20, 2011, the Torque engine and GarageGames brand was purchased and the company was re-launched, as GarageGames again, with new CEO Eric Preisz. The company moved to a new office in Las Vegas, Nevada. In 2011, GarageGames began doing game and technology-based service work. The company created the Microsoft Digital Literacy Program for Windows 8 and an undisclosed project for a World Famous Theme Park. The company also created game-based learning courses for online colleges in the areas of criminal justice, customer service and career development.

In 2014, GarageGames CEO Eric Preisz announced the establishment of GG|Interactive, a subsidiary of GarageGames that would focus on bringing game design, game programming and game development courses to middle schools, high schools and colleges. Under the product name Dev|Pro: Game Development Curriculum, the company offers digital education courses in the areas of computer science, game design and programming. Offices for GG|Interactive were established in Vancouver, Washington while the Las Vegas offices remained open.

== Torque ==
GarageGames offered the Torque Game Engine for sale in 2000, offering the technology under a per-seat "Indie" license. GarageGames also offered "Commercial" licensing options to companies with more than $250,000 in annual revenues. In 2012, GarageGames announced that both the Torque 2D Engine and Torque 3D Engine would be offered free as an open-source MIT license. The source code was released on GitHub on September 20, 2012. Torque is primarily a video game development technology. Various versions of the engine have been used to develop more than 200 published games. It has been licensed by Electronic Arts, NC Soft, Sony, Disney, Vivendi Universal, Hasbro, and many other game teams and publishers and it has officially supported middleware for Microsoft and Nintendo.

Torque is also used for non-game applications like serious games and virtual worlds. It has been licensed by NASA, L3, Lockheed Martin and it has been used for dozens of virtual worlds applications like Onverse and by IBM for internal and external training simulations. Torque is currently used for education in more than 200 schools and universities worldwide.

== Game development ==
Title	System	Release date	Genre	Ref(s)
Caribbean Hideaway	Windows, Macintosh	January 23, 2008	Casual	
Chain Reaction	Windows		Puzzle	
Dark Horizons Lore: Invasion	Linux	February 11, 2005	Action, mech	
Dark Horizons Lore: Invasion	Microsoft Windows, Macintosh	March 22, 2005	Action, mech	
Realm Wars	Windows	March 1, 2003	Action	
Fallen Empire: Legions	Windows	2008	Action	
Legions: Overdrive	Windows	December 20, 2010	Action	
Marble Blast Gold	Linux	May 2, 2002	Platform, puzzle	
Marble Blast Gold	Macintosh	May 2, 2002	Platform, puzzle	
Marble Blast Gold	Windows	May 2, 2002	Platform, puzzle	
Marble Blast Gold	Xbox Live Arcade	May 2, 2002	Platform, puzzle	
Marble Blast Ultra	Xbox 360, Windows	January 25, 2006	Platform, puzzle	
Rack'em Up Roadtrip	Windows		Sport	
Rokkitball	Windows	April 2008	Action, sport	
Think Tanks	Windows	2005	Action	
Think Tanks	Xbox Live Arcade	2005	Action	
Z.A.P.	Windows	March 2008	Action	
