= Tribes: Aerial Assault =

2002 video game

- Developer: Inevitable Entertainment
- Publisher: Sierra Entertainment
- Series: Tribes
- Platform: PlayStation 2
- Release: NA: September 24, 2002
- Genre: First-person shooter
- Modes: Single-player, multiplayer

Tribes: Aerial Assault is an online first-person shooter video game released for PlayStation 2 in 2002 by Sierra Entertainment. It was one of the first PlayStation 2 titles designed almost exclusively for online play and was the first online PlayStation 2 shooter that supports both modem and broadband connections. It was announced in tandem with Sony's online strategy for the PlayStation 2 at E3 2001.

== Gameplay ==
Tribes: Aerial Assault is a first-person shooter game with an emphasis on mobility. There are many game types in the single-player campaign and multi-player, including capture the flag (CTF), capture and hold, hunter, team deathmatch, and deathmatch. Campaign usually consists of some mixture of these game types.

In all games but hunters and deathmatch, there are team and player points. Depending on the game style, team and player points can reflect two completely different things. Player points are usually earned through an individual player's accomplishments that help the team as a whole. Player points are earned by setting and deploying equipment, repairing friendly assets, destroying enemy assets, defending friendly assets, and completing objectives of the game.

- Capture the Flag: Both teams have a flag, and the objective is to capture the other teams flag. The "runner" is unencumbered by the flag, that is; he/she can still use weapons and grenades freely and without debilitation. After either team has captured the flag 8 times, or the time limit runs out, the game is over and the team with the most points wins. In CTF, team points reflect how many times a team has captured, or attempted to capture the flag. Trying to capture the flag, but dying before reaching the base, gives the player's team one point. Successfully getting the enemy flag to one's own base rewards the player team a hundred points.
- Capture and hold: This is an asset-guarding game. Usually there are four buildings or bases scattered over the whole map. Inside each of these is a switch. The objective is to touch the switch in any building and try to prevent the enemy team from doing the same for as long as possible. For every second that a base is held, that team gets one point. When the time runs out, the team with the most team points wins.
- Hunter: A survival-based game. The objective is to kill as many people as possible and collect the flags that they drop, and then try to bring those flags back to a central "nexus" for points. There are no teams in Hunter, so everyone is an enemy. If someone drops more than five flags, everyone in the game is alerted as to who has the flags and who dropped them.
- Team Deathmatch: Two teams duke it out until time runs out. 1 kill = 1 point. The team with the most points when time runs out wins.
- Deathmatch: No teams, few rules, kill or be killed. The person with the most points at time-out wins.

Like most first-person shooters, Tribes: Aerial Assault has a Heads Up Display (HUD). The HUD consists of a crosshair, health, energy reserve, grenades and grenade type, pack type, armor heat, lock-on detection, and vehicle condition. The HUD also has target identification, that is, a red arrow over the target is an enemy, a green arrow is a friend. An unusual feature of Tribes: Aerial Assault is the jetpack feature. The jetpack runs on armor energy and allows players to fly for short to medium distances.

== Story ==
It is the year 3945 A.C. (five years after the events of Tribes 2). On the frontier "Wilderzone" of human space, hardy neo-barbarian tribes compete for possession of new worlds. Tribal warriors enter combat in powered armor, relying on skill and bravery to win glory. BioDerm Hordes have started to invade tribal space. Though the tribes boast of being the finest warriors humanity has ever produced, they face a genetically modified race that has literally bred itself for battle. The stakes are epic, and the Wilderzone is aflame with a new kind of war. The player controls J. Ransom, a recently recruited newblood. After a training segment, the story follows J. Ransom through missions to fight off the BioDerm horde and keep control of tribal space.

== Development ==
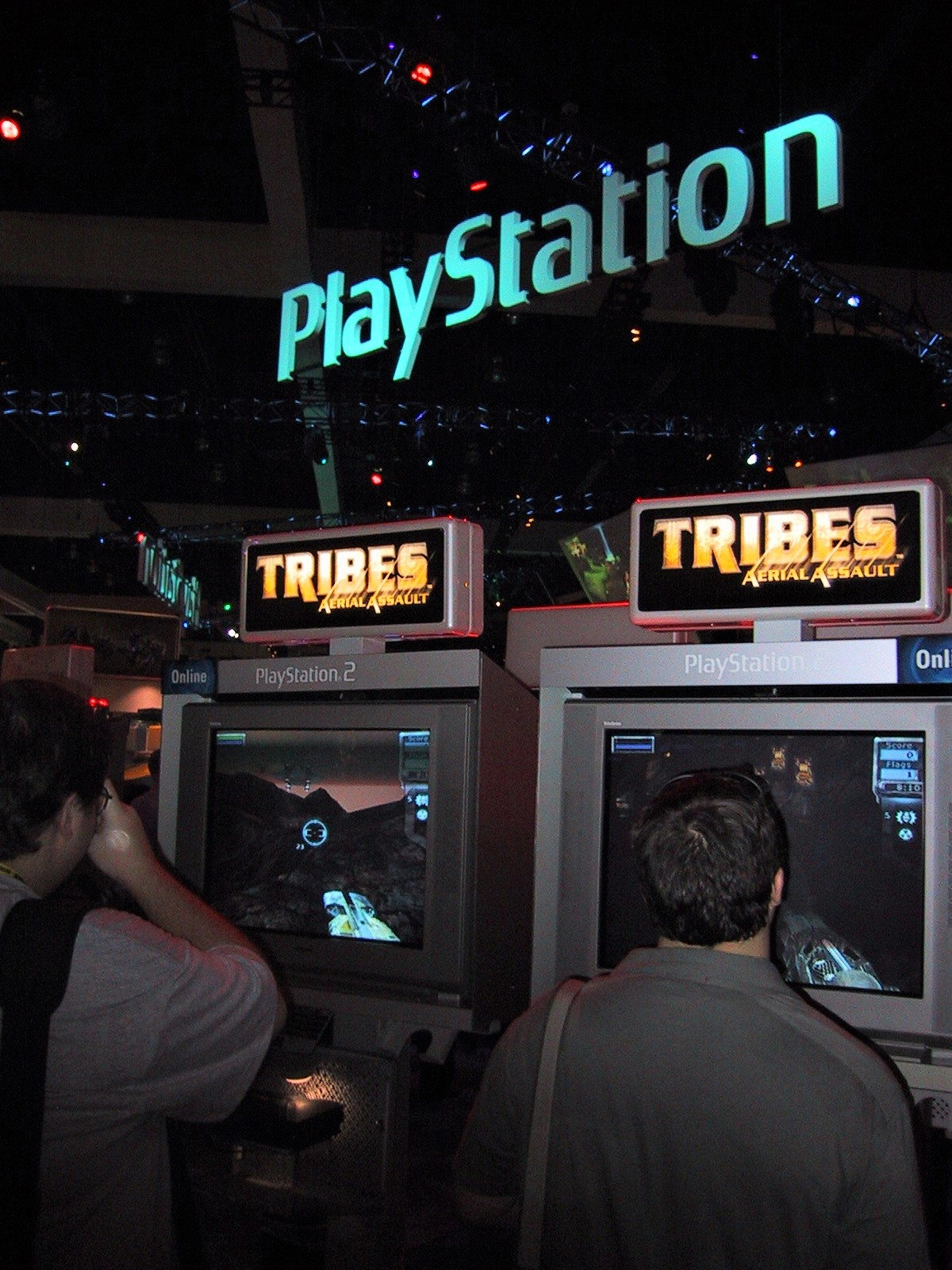
Tribes: Aerial Assault for the PlayStation 2 demonstrated at the Electronic Entertainment Expo (E3) in 2002

Like Halo: Combat Evolved the year before, Sierra had hoped that gameplay elements popular on the PC would translate well to console and would catch on with a much bigger audience. Unlike the Xbox however, the PlayStation required an external device for online connection, which despite the console's success, limited the game's potential audience. In addition, PlayStation online functionality did not arrive in Europe until June 2003, and Ethernet ports were not added to the PlayStation 2 until 2004.

Sierra Entertainment was the publisher for Tribes: Aerial Assault. Tribes: Aerial Assault was developed by Inevitable Entertainment, as Tribes: Aerial Assault was a port from the PC game Tribes 2, essentially making it a simplified Tribes 2 for the PlayStation 2 console.

In early November 2008, Sierra shut down the online servers for 21 games, including Tribes: Aerial Assault. In 2015, the game was released as freeware by Hi-Rez Studios.

== Reception ==
Reception

Aggregate score
Aggregator	Score
Metacritic	73/100

Review scores
Publication	Score
Electronic Gaming Monthly	6.17/10
Game Informer	8/10
GamePro	3/5
GameSpot	7.2/10
GameSpy	4/5
GameZone	8.5/10
IGN	7.2/10
Official U.S. PlayStation Magazine	3.5/5
PlayStation: The Official Magazine	8/10
X-Play	3/5

The game received "average" reviews according to the review aggregation website Metacritic.
