= Tribes 2 =

2001 video game

- Developers: Dynamix (Windows); Loki Entertainment (Linux)
- Publishers: Sierra On-Line; Loki Entertainment (Linux)
- Director: David Georgeson
- Producers: David Georgeson; Chris Mahnken
- Designers: Eric Lanz; Dave Meddish; Jesse Russell
- Programmer: Mark Frohnmayer
- Artist: Craig Maitlen
- Writer: Blake Hutchins
- Composer: Timothy Steven Clarke
- Series: Tribes
- Engine: Torque
- Platforms: Windows, Linux
- Release: Windows: NA: March 29, 2001; EU: April 13, 2001; Linux; April 19, 2001
- Genre: First-person shooter
- Modes: Single-player, multiplayer

Tribes 2 is a first-person shooter multiplayer video game developed by Dynamix and published by Sierra On-Line in 2001 as a sequel to Starsiege: Tribes.

== Setting ==
Set in the year 3941 of the fictional Earthsiege universe, Tribes 2 allows the user to play as a soldier in one of several factions (referred to in the game as tribes), namely the Children of the Phoenix, the Blood Eagle, the Diamond Sword, and the Starwolf. Players can also choose to play a rebelling human-created soldier/worker race called the BioDerms. None of the factions differ from each other in strengths or weaknesses, but each has a distinctive look and background story.

== Gameplay ==
Tribes 2 is a multiplayer online game, designed for Internet or LAN play with up to 128 players (64 vs 64) or bots per match, although a small single-player tutorial mode is included. The game may be played from both first- and third-person perspectives. Each match takes place on an Earthsiege-themed map. The Tribes 2 engine, an early version of the Torque Game Engine, is capable of both indoor and outdoor maps, with expansive play areas. Player movement about the map may be on foot, using a jet pack, or in various ground and airborne vehicles as pilot, co-pilot, or passenger.

Each match is played according to one of a number of possible game modes, which dictate the rules of the match. These modes include Capture the Flag, deathmatch, Rabbit, Arena, Hunters, Siege, Gauntlet, and Bounty. Players are free to choose their own role, and may deploy various items of weaponry, vehicles, and emplacements. Many of these items can be left unattended to operate automatically, or control may be assumed by players. Each player may also choose from three armor types (which trade off various abilities, e.g. weak but fast, strong but slow, or median), and a weapon and equipment loadout, which may be reconfigured at any time during a match.

The large variety of equipment and deployable items results in many opportunities for creative play and tactics, from pure combat to stealth. Tribes 2 gameplay makes extensive use of jet pack-powered flight, which adds a notable vertical element to combat, and a skiing action to slide down slopes. As such, playing style varies dramatically from player to player, and from moment to moment, but Tribes 2 gameplay may be generalized as being fast-paced three-dimensional combat over a wide playing area. Player vs player combat is a central element of Tribes 2 gameplay, even in team-based modes.

== Development and release ==
Tribes 2 was developed by Dynamix as a sequel to Starsiege: Tribes. Mötley Crüe recorded a song for the game that was never released with the game.

On November 2, 2008, Sierra/Vivendi disabled the authentication servers required for its online multiplayer and dropped all official support for the Tribes franchise.

In early 2009, a fan community project provided an unofficial patch and replacement server which restored online multiplayer functionality.

The Torque 3D game engine, on which Tribes 2 is built, was released by GarageGames under the MIT license on September 20, 2012. The Tribes 2 source code beside the Torque engine was not made available.

Published by Sierra On-Line, it was released for Microsoft Windows in North America on March 29, 2001, in Europe on April 13, 2001, and in Japan on June 22, 2001 (where it was published by Capcom). A Linux port was released by Loki Entertainment on April 19, 2001.

On November 20, 2002, Sierra released an update for Tribes 2. This update contained two new game types, new maps and updates to address several issues. Sierra, which was then part of Vivendi Universal Games, licensed the franchise to Irrational Games for a third installment; Tribes: Vengeance was released in October 2004.

In an effort to increase interest in the upcoming sequel, Sierra released both the original Starsiege: Tribes and Tribes 2 as freeware download on May 4, 2004.

In 2015, the game was released as freeware by Hi-Rez Studios.

== Reception ==
Reception

Aggregate score
Aggregator	Score
Metacritic	88/100

Review scores
Publication	Score
AllGame	3.5/5
Computer Games Magazine	4/5
Computer Gaming World	2/5
EP Daily	9/10
Eurogamer	8/10
Game Informer	8/10
GameRevolution	B
GameSpot	8.5/10
GameSpy	89%
GameZone	9.3/10
IGN	8.9/10
Next Generation	5/5
PC Gamer (US)	89%
X-Play	4/5
The Cincinnati Enquirer	4/5
FHM	5/5

Tribes 2 received "generally favorable reviews" according to the review aggregation website Metacritic. Kevin Rice of NextGen said of the game, "It's not terribly friendly toward newbies, and the system requirements are stiff, but wow... There's nothing else this incredibly good for team-based multiplayer mayhem." Human Tornado of GamePro said, Tribes veterans will want to pick up Tribes 2, but newbies will need some patience to enjoy the game." (Note: GamePro gave the game 3/5 for graphics, 5/5 for sound, 3.5/5 for control, and 4/5 for fun factor.)

The game was commercially successful. Its sales had surpassed 200,000 units and were steadily rising by the time of Dynamix's closure in November 2001, according to the company's Dave Georgeson. Sales in North America alone reached 245,069 units by the end of 2001, according to PC Data. This amounted to $9.7 million in revenue. In August 2006, Edge declared it the U.S.' 70th best-selling computer game released between January 2000 and August 2006. Combined sales of all Tribes computer games released between those dates had reached 480,000 units in the U.S. by August 2006.
