= Tribes: Vengeance =

2004 video game

- Developer: Irrational Games
- Publisher: Vivendi Universal Games (Note: Released under the Sierra Entertainment brand name)
- Producers: Chris Mahnken; Tony Oakden
- Designer: Edward Orman
- Programmer: Rowan Wyborn
- Artist: Andrew James
- Writer: Ken Levine
- Composer: Eric Brosius
- Series: Tribes
- Engine: Unreal Engine 2 (Build 2226)
- Platform: Windows
- Release: NA: October 5, 2004; EU: October 22, 2004
- Genre: First-person shooter
- Modes: Single-player, multiplayer

Tribes: Vengeance is a science fiction first-person shooter video game developed by Irrational Games and released by Vivendi Universal Games in October 2004. It was built on an enhanced version of the Unreal Engine 2.5, which Irrational Games called the Vengeance engine. Part of the Tribes series, in addition to its multiplayer network maps, Vengeance includes a complete single-player campaign.

== Gameplay ==
As a primarily first-person shooter, Tribes: Vengeance places the player in control of an infantry soldier in power armor. While the game is tailored for first-person shooting, the player can also toggle to a third-person view at any time. Additionally, there are multiple pilotable vehicles, which are restricted to third-person camera.

The game's most distinguishing features are the jetpacks and "skis" offered on all variants of the power armor. Jetpacks allow the player to fly for short periods of time, using the player's energy meter. This energy regenerates whenever the jetpack is not active. Skiing may be activated any time the player is on foot and does not cost energy; this switches the player to a frictionless ground-travel mode, allowing the player to slide very rapidly down slopes and (with sufficient speed before activating the skis) across flat terrain. Skiing up a slope will cause the player to slow due to gravity.

Combat occurs primarily with ranged weapons, including bullet and explosive projectile firearms. Each character, vehicle, and machine has hit points. Anything with hit points may be repaired by "repair packs"; infantry may also pick up medkits dropped by other infantry upon death. The game offers three classes of armor: light, medium, and heavy. Heavier armor offers more hit points and ammunition but slower movement.

The player has three weapon slots, grenades, and a utility slot; the utility slot holds items such as repair packs, speed packs, energy packs and deployables like repair stations, turrets and inventory stations.

The introduction of a grappler gun adds another aspect to movement in the game. This is the first and only game in the Tribes franchise to include such a mechanic.

=== Single-player ===
The single player campaign follows five playable characters (Victoria, Daniel, Julia, Mercury, and Jericho) whom the player navigates through 18 missions. The missions are played in achronological order, set either in "The Past" (Victoria, Daniel, Julia, Mercury) or in "The Present" (Julia, Jericho, Mercury), with the former detailing the story of Julia's birth and childhood and the latter describing her search for vengeance upon the Tribals and later, for her own psychological identity.

=== Multiplayer ===
The multiplayer mode offers five different default game types and a diversity of map locations. Players are ranked during matches by points they acquire through the match. You can get offensive (killing an opponent, capturing a flag, or destroying enemy equipment), defensive (returning a flag, repairing your equipment, or killing an enemy flag carrier), or by style points (hit a head shot with a sniper rifle, or hitting someone in mid-air with a spinfusor disk).

- Arena is a 'Team Free for All' in which two teams fight for up to 9 rounds. There is no respawn, so once a player dies, they must wait for the next round before they can play again. Whichever team has more rounds won at the end of a match wins. This game type is inherited from earlier Tribes games.
- Ball is a game type where two teams play against each other with a goal for each team. There is a single ball located somewhere on the map, usually in the middle. The objective is to get the ball and throw it into the enemy's goal. Whichever team has the most points at the end wins. This game is original to Tribes: Vengeance, but also resembles Unreal Tournament 2003 and Unreal Tournament 2004's Bombing Run game.

Maps can differ from a lush terrain like this to a rough desert landscape.

- In Fuel, both teams have a fuel depot at their base. There is one neutral fuel depot which the players can collect fuel from, as well as a depot for each team. Players may stand within these to gradually steal fuel or, if it is their own team's, to deposit fuel. The less fuel in the depot, the slower it takes to collect it. As well as the depots, players can collect fuel cells from the ground that may have originally spawned there randomly on the game's start, or have been dropped upon a player's death. The maximum amount of fuel a character can carry is 15, and each fuel cell contains a specific amount of fuel. Whenever a player dies, their team's fuel depot loses one unit of fuel. Whichever team fills their depot first is the winner. This game type is original to Tribes: Vengeance
- Rabbit is the only 'Free for All' game mode in Tribes: Vengeance. In this, there are no teams, but a single flag on the map somewhere, usually in the middle of the map. The objective for every player is to retrieve the flag and run. Whenever a player retrieves the flag, every other player will be alerted, and whoever has the flag will be marked as their enemy. Points are gained by holding on to the flag as long as possible and killing the other players. Points are lost by killing somebody who does not have the flag. No points are gained by killing the flag carrier. The game is timed, and whoever has the most points at the end is the winner. This game mode is common to all Tribes games, as well as many other games.
- Capture the Flag mode is similar to its Tribes equivalent. There are two teams, each with a flag and a flag stand. The objective for each team is to capture the enemy flag and bring it back to their base. However, the team's flag must be at their flag stand in order for them to capture the enemy's flag. Points are awarded for every flag capture, and for every flag return. The game can be ended by time running out, or a team capturing the enemy flag until the max amount of captures achieved. If it is ended by time, whichever team had more points wins. Matches can end in the event of a tie.

== Plot ==
Set hundreds of years before the events of Starsiege: Tribes, Vengeance depicts the birth of the growing Tribal War. It focuses on the events surrounding five different characters over the course of two generations and how they each contribute to the developing war. The story ("The Past") begins with a Phoenix sub-clan leader named Daniel (voiced by Gabriel Olds) abducting the soon to be Queen, Princess Victoria. He takes her to his home world to show her the injustices done to his people, and the two eventually fall in love. During this time, a cybrid assassin named Mercury is hired by an unknown contractor to eliminate Daniel, but the hit is called off moments before the shot is fired. Victoria and Daniel try to make amends between the Imperials and the Phoenix, but it ends disastrously when the Phoenix's enemies, the Blood Eagle tribe, stage a raid on a Phoenix base disguised as Imperial troops. Feeling betrayed, Daniel kills the Imperial King, Tiberius, whom Victoria avenges by killing Daniel. It turns out that Victoria is pregnant with Daniel's child, who is born female and named Julia soon thereafter.

Years later, Daniel's brother, General Jericho (Steve Blum), raids the Imperial Palace and kills Victoria in front of Julia. As a result, Julia (Tara Strong) becomes an anti-Tribal extremist and uses her standing and fighting prowess to humiliate the Tribals at every opportunity (in "The Present"). Eventually, she captures the leader of the Phoenix, Esther (Nika Futterman), and stages a trap for Jericho. Jericho, however, is killed by Mercury before Julia can exact her revenge. She then learns about her true father and goes to Esther for guidance. Esther trains Julia as a Phoenix, accepts her into the Tribe, and the two try to mediate peace. At this point, news arrives that the Blood Eagles have taken Olivia (Ellen Crawford), late Victoria's sister and Julia's last living relative, captive. Julia hurries to her rescue but discovers that Olivia has, in fact, been Mercury's mysterious employer and a co-conspirator of the Blood Eagle leader Seti all along. Together, Olivia and Seti try to orchestrate an industrial accident to kill a large number of Imperial civilians and escalate the Tribal War, but Julia succeeds in foiling their scheme.

Although the game's ending sees Mercury and Seti killed by Julia, Olivia escapes in the last moment, leaving the story without a definite conclusion. This may have been addressed on in the unreleased patch as an additional story mode.

== Development ==
On March 23, 2005 it was announced that Vivendi Universal Games was ceasing all support for the game, beginning with the termination of the 1.1 version update. In a January 2006 interview, in response to suggestions of a falling out between VU Games and Irrational, Ken Levine commented:

...This falling out with VUG is some kind of Jedi mind trick, man. We just finished an expansion pack [for SWAT 4] for them, and it went as smooth as cream cheese. With Tribes, we did a patch, and for whatever reason they decided not to release it.

In 2015, the game was released as freeware by Hi-Rez Studios.

== Reception ==
Reception

Aggregate score
Aggregator	Score
Metacritic	83/100

Review scores
Publication	Score
Computer Gaming World	3.5/5
Edge	7/10
Game Informer	8.5/10
GameRevolution	B+
GameSpot	8.8/10
GameSpy	4/5
GameZone	9/10
IGN	9/10
PC Gamer (US)	70%
X-Play	3/5
The Sydney Morning Herald	4/5

The game received "favorable" reviews according to the review aggregation website Metacritic.

Tribes: Vengeance was a runner-up for Computer Games Magazine's list of the 10 best computer games of 2004.

The game won the Australian Game Developers Awards in the categories of Best PC Game and Best Game of 2004.
