= Tribes: Ascend =

2012 video game

- Developer: Hi-Rez Studios
- Publisher: Hi-Rez Studios
- Designer: Scott Zier
- Programmer: Mick Larkins
- Artist: Sean McBride
- Composer: Chris Rickwood
- Series: Tribes
- Engine: Unreal Engine 3
- Platform: Microsoft Windows
- Release: April 12, 2012
- Genre: First-person shooter
- Mode: Multiplayer

Tribes: Ascend is a free-to-play first-person shooter developed and published by Hi-Rez Studios for Microsoft Windows, as part of the Tribes series. Aspects from previous Tribes games such as jetpacks and skiing are featured in the game.

== Gameplay ==
The player is in the Temple Ruins map using the Light Spinfusor weapon.

=== Loadouts and Classes ===
Tribes: Ascend features a class-based loadout system. Each loadout specifies what type of armor the player has, along with what weapons and items they carry. Each loadout supports two in-hand weapons, a set of belt items such as grenades or mines and a pack. Hi-Rez also sold cosmetic items such as player skins, along with boosters that allowed players to gain experience points at a faster rate.

==== GOTY edition ====
There were three possible sizes of armor to choose: light, medium and heavy, with three loadouts in each weight group (for a total of nine). Players can select which loadout to use either when first joining a game, respawning, or at an inventory station. Loadouts may be acquired either through an upfront payment, or through playing the game and earning experience points, which can be used to purchase classes, weapons, perks, and upgrades. Paid-for loadouts are available to the user immediately, while those who unlock them through playtime have a much longer wait. Upgrades to armor, weapons and perks are unlocked based on how much players use them in-game, but can also be purchased by experience points. Players were given three free classes when first starting the game, each wearing light, medium and heavy armor respectively. Players earn in-match credits during matches for killing enemies, repairing structures or capturing objectives. Credits were then used to buy vehicles, supply drops, Tactical strikes, Orbital strikes, and base upgrades.

==== OOTB edition ====
After the Out Of The Blue update in December 2015, the game experienced a reduction of playable classes. The nine available classes were condensed into three weight groups. Base upgrades were removed, along with Supply Drops, Tactical Strikes, in-match credits, and Orbital Strikes. All monetization features such as paid classes, experience boosters, and weapons were removed or made free of charge.

=== Game modes and maps ===
- Capture the Flag: Both teams have a base that contains a flag; teams must steal their opponent's flag and capture it to score points.
- Team Deathmatch: Teams must kill each other to score points, whichever team hits the specified score limit wins
- Rabbit: One player holds a flag (the "rabbit") and passively earns points while doing so. All of the other players must try and kill them to hold the flag themselves and earn points until a limit is reached. The player with the most points ends.
- Arena: A variant of Team Deathmatch, where each team has a limited amount of spawns. The team that runs out of spawns first (or has less when the timer ends) loses.
- Capture & Hold: Each team attempts to capture and control points to earn score throughout the match. The team with the most score at the end wins.

The map Katabatic, which originally appeared in Tribes 2, has been remade in Tribes: Ascend along with some other maps appearing in previous games in the series.

=== Ranking system ===
The ranking system is a vanity reward for players but used to be an element for the removed in-game queue system. Each level of a rank has a unique rank title and insignia. Players begin as a rank 1 ("Recruit") and earn ranks as they play the game. Each players' current rank insignia is displayed next to their name on the in-game scoreboard. Rank title and insignia are shown to an enemy player that the player has recently killed (displayed on the kill-cam screen). A summary report of rank experience earned is displayed on the post-match scoreboard screen at the end of each map. An experience bar is also present.

== Development and release ==
Ports to the PlayStation 3 and Xbox 360 were briefly considered but never entered development due to the game's free-to-play business model.

The game entered open beta on February 22, 2012 (with some modes disabled such as Rabbit) and was officially released on April 12, 2012. In February 2013, Hi-Rez released a Game of the Year Edition, which unlocked all classes, weapons, equipment, and perks in a single package. In July 2013, Hi-Rez halted further development on Tribes: Ascend to focus on Smite, citing lackluster financial returns from Tribes: Ascend and Global Agenda. Despite the previous statement, a small team resumed development in August 2015. In December 2015, Hi-Rez Studios announced a patch, called Out Of The Blue, for the game which introduced major changes. Due to the nature of the patch, the company reverted all previous in-game purchases. The final update, dubbed Parting Gifts, was released on September 29, 2016. Sean McBride, creative director of Tribes: Ascend, likened the game's history to be “death by a thousand cuts”.

== Reception ==
Reception

Aggregate score
Aggregator	Score
Metacritic	86/100

Review scores
Publication	Score
Edge	9/10
Eurogamer	10/10
GameSpot	8/10
IGN	9/10
PC Gamer (US)	88/100

Tribes: Ascend was met with positive reception, with IGN giving the game a 9/10. It has a Metacritic rating of 86.
