= Metaltech: Battledrome =

1994 video game

- Developer: Dynamix
- Publisher: Sierra On-Line
- Producer: Mark Crowe
- Designers: David Selle; Tim Gift
- Programmer: Tim Gift
- Artist: Mark Crowe
- Writers: Neal Hallford; David Selle; Gregory Rucka; Kurt Weber
- Composers: Christopher Stevens; Timothy Steven Clarke
- Platform: DOS
- Release: 1994
- Genre: Simulation
- Modes: Single-player, multiplayer

Metaltech: Battledrome is a mecha-style simulation video game in the Metaltech series developed by Dynamix and released in 1994. It was published alongside its companion game Earthsiege and shares roughly the same gaming mechanics and strategy but takes place in a completely different setting.

== Graphics ==
The game features a fully three-dimensional simulation of mech combat. All in-game objects are textured and there are rudimentary physics present, however this caused the game to have high hardware requirements for computers at the time.

== Gameplay ==
The player competes against other players (over a network) or against AI-players for local game. The player must purchase equipment such as the HERC chassis, generators, shields, servos as well as weapons and then challenge others to fight against them. During negotiation both parties can set stakes (in addition to preset in game rewards), set fighting conditions, and limit weaponry.

The battle is carried out in an arena, limited in size by its borders. On the arena, two players compete tactically against each other and are watched by a flying referee bot, who assigns penalties (walking past arena borders) or can disqualify (in the event a player uses forbidden weapons). The arena may contain a variable amount of obstacles such as, gun turrets, arena size, and different lightning conditions.

Unique to the Battledrome is the model of energy distribution in the HERC. Each player can redistribute priority between engine, shield and weapons. Combined with weapon limitations, conditions met previously during negotiation phase between the players, HERC chassis qualities (some HERCs have stronger torso, yet weaker legs and vice versa) and arena hazards - this allows a variety of tactics: hit-and-run, outrun and cautious attack, direct assault, damage absorption with retaliation, outsmarting by weapon range and many others.

The fight ends based on condition defined during negotiation, typically with obliteration or surrender (which is time-delayed) of one of the players. The winner receives the prize as well as the enemy's bet. Additional rewards include higher ranking and reputation which unlocks access to heavier HERCs. The loser must pay his stake and goes down the ranking ladder. Both parties have option to repair their HERC.

If the player is able to maintain their Herc operational, they can challenge other players again.

== Reception ==
Reception

Review score
Publication	Score
Computer Gaming World	3/5

Computer Gaming World rated the game as less visually attractive than Earthsiege and criticized the awkward controls among other complaints such as a weak single player mode. However, Computer Gaming World did praise the game's multiplayer feature.
