= Starsiege: Tribes =

1998 video game

- Developer: Dynamix
- Publisher: Sierra On-Line
- Director: Tim Gift
- Producer: Ken Embery
- Designer: Scott Youngblood
- Programmer: Mark Frohnmayer
- Artists: Barry Drew; Shawn Sharp; Gerald Harrison; Mark Brenneman; K. Maren Wyatt
- Writer: Blake Hutchins
- Series: Tribes
- Platform: Microsoft Windows
- Release: NA: 23 December 1998; UK: 14 May 1999
- Genre: First-person shooter
- Mode: Multiplayer

Starsiege: Tribes is a first-person shooter video game. It is the first of the Tribes video game series and follows the story from Metaltech: Earthsiege and Starsiege. It was developed by Dynamix and published by Sierra On-Line in 1998. An expansion pack, Tribes Extreme, was cancelled; it was supposed to add single-player missions, multiplayer maps, and bot AI.

== Gameplay ==
Starsiege: Tribes screenshot

Tribes is a squad-based multiplayer online game. The story is set in the 40th century, after humanity has settled across the galaxies via jumpgates. Conflict has broken out between several factions of humans, the four largest of which are the Children of the Phoenix, who descend from people isolated from the Great Human Empire during the "jumpgate diaspora", Blood Eagle, a force of imperial knights originally sent from the Empire to subdue Humans who have gone 'tribal' over time, and Diamond Sword and Starwolf, who are of secondary importance, with innumerable other splinter tribes constantly fighting for territory. The player assumes the role of a warrior loyal to one of the four major tribes battling in the front lines of the conflict.

The battles take place in one of 40 levels. Most of the standard maps are outdoors environments in a variety of climates, from sunshine to snow and hail. In general, bases are scattered throughout the map depending on the game type. The outdoor environments can extend for several in-game kilometers.

There are five distinct "default" game types:

- Capture the flag (CTF) - Each team (up to eight, normally less than three on any given mission) has one or more bases and a single flag. Each team tries to take an opposing team's flag and touch it to their own, which "captures" the flag and awards the capturing team a point. If a flag carrier is killed, the flag is dropped; the flag can be picked up by a teammate to finish the capture, instantly returned to its base by a member of the flag's team, or returned after a certain interval of time. Stalemates often occur when multiple teams' flags are taken at the same time; a team's flag must be at its base to accomplish a "cap". Capture the Flag is a popular mode, with 75 percent of servers running this game type.
- Deathmatch (DM) - It can be played with or without teams; in both cases, players must get the highest number of kills to win.
- Capture and hold (C&H) - Teams must seek out capturable bases or other assets, sometimes complete with turrets and stations, throughout the map. Points are given based on the amount of time an asset is "owned".
- Defend and destroy (D&D) - Players on a team must destroy certain items in an enemy's base before the enemy does the same to their base. Subsequent team-based First-person shooter games, however, did use variations of the concept (such as with the later Unreal Tournament and its "Assault" game type). Defend and Destroy is the second-most popular game type.
- Find and retrieve (F&R) - A number of flags are scattered across the mission area. Team members must find and bring them back to their base. The flags can be captured from the enemy as well. The team to capture all the flags wins.

Each player wears either light, medium, or heavy armor. Heavier armors supply larger amounts of armor, energy, and ammunition. Different armor types support different weapons and equipment; for example, only the heavy armor supports the heavy mortar but only light armor supports the sniper rifle. When damage is dealt to the player (by falling or being hurt by a weapon), armor is lost. Loss of all armor results in the player's death. After dying, the player respawns at the team's base (or somewhere in the field). Players also have an energy cell, which is drawn on for jetting, firing some kinds of weapons, and activating packs. The different armor types can be accessed at an inventory station. There are various items of equipment usable by the players, including vehicles, eight weapons, and "Packs" which alter the abilities of the player. On some maps, bases include various defense mechanisms and other tools to assist the team: Generators, turrets, stations, and sensors. Generators provide power to systems. Destroying them can disable an entire team's defense by deactivating turrets and stations. Weapons include the heavy mortar, sniper rifle, explosive disc launcher, short-range gatling gun, grenade launcher, blaster, plasma rifle, and laser rifle.

=== Movement ===
In addition to running and jumping, players are equipped with a jetpack which allows them to accelerate into the air until the armor's energy is used up. In addition to straight-line movement, the jetpack has other versatile uses. It can be used to make short hops whilst zig-zagging to make a player harder to target in open areas. An upward thrust can help the player evade oncoming enemies armed with short-range weapons.

Another method of movement is known as "skiing", and relies on an exploitation of the game's physics engine. If a player taps the jump button with the correct timing whilst descending a hill, their momentum will accumulate. High speeds can be achieved this way, and if this momentum takes the player to the crest of another hill, the jetpack can be used to rapidly propel them across the map. This technique was later developed into a game feature by Dynamix for Tribes 2.

== Development ==
The game was announced in May 1998.

== Reception ==
Reception

Aggregate score
Aggregator	Score
GameRankings	85%

Review scores
Publication	Score
AllGame	4.5/5
CNET Gamecenter	8 out of 10
Computer Games Strategy Plus	4/5
Computer Gaming World	4/5
GamePro	(D.E.) 5/5 (J.S.) 4.5/5
GameSpot	8.6 out of 10
GameZone	9 out of 10
IGN	9.3 out of 10
Next Generation	5/5
PC Accelerator	(ToT) 10 out of 10; 9 out of 10
PC Gamer (US)	92%
The Cincinnati Enquirer	3/4

The game received "favorable" reviews according to the review aggregation website GameRankings.

GameSpot considered the game to be an almost perfect balance between gameplay, online connectivity, and speedy performance. The multiplayer gameplay drew comparisons with NovaLogic's Delta Force, with good visuals and customizable weapon loadouts. The maps were highlighted as being wonderfully rendered, with seamless indoor-outdoor transitions. The site's criticisms included the difficulty in conducting long-range combat, a lack of close-combat weapons, and the queues that form at weapon consoles. They felt that Tribes would have benefited from a stronger training mode and better handling of scores and statistics. The website later chose the game as one of "The Greatest Games of All Time" in 2005. Next Generation said, "Tribes has the design and the technology to be the next standard in Internet action gaming. There are over 100+ servers available (all free) and more are popping up all the time. This is the first of a new breed of game and we can't recommend it enough."

The game sold 98,840 copies during 1999. The company expected to sell more than 250,000 copies of the game.

The Academy of Interactive Arts & Sciences named Starsiege: Tribes the winner for "Online Action/Strategy Game of the Year" at the 2nd Annual Interactive Achievement Awards; it was also nominated for "PC Action Game of the Year" and "Computer Entertainment Title of the Year", although it ultimately lost both awards to Half-Life. The game won Computer Games Strategy Plus' 1998 "Online Game of the Year" award. The staff highlighted its "excellent Internet performance, depth of strategies and tactics, and its accessibility and ease of play." It also won the "Best Online Game of the Year" award at IGN's Best of 1998 Awards. PC Gamer US awarded the game its 1999 "Special Achievement in Innovation" prize; the staff raved that "Tribes re-wrote the rules of online combat", and that it features "airtight networking code and what is still today one of the best self-contained online interfaces we've ever seen." It was a finalist for the magazine's "Best Multiplayer Game" award, as well as PC PowerPlay's "Best Online Only" award, but lost both of them to Team Fortress Classic.

== Sequels ==
A sequel, Tribes 2, was released in March 2001. Sierra licensed the franchise to Irrational Games for a third installment, Tribes: Vengeance, which was released in October 2004. Vivendi Universal released Starsiege: Tribes and Tribes 2 for free on May 4, 2004 on a DVD-ROM with Computer Gaming World magazine and on FilePlanet in order to promote the release of Tribes: Vengeance.
