= Hi-Rez Studios =

American video game company

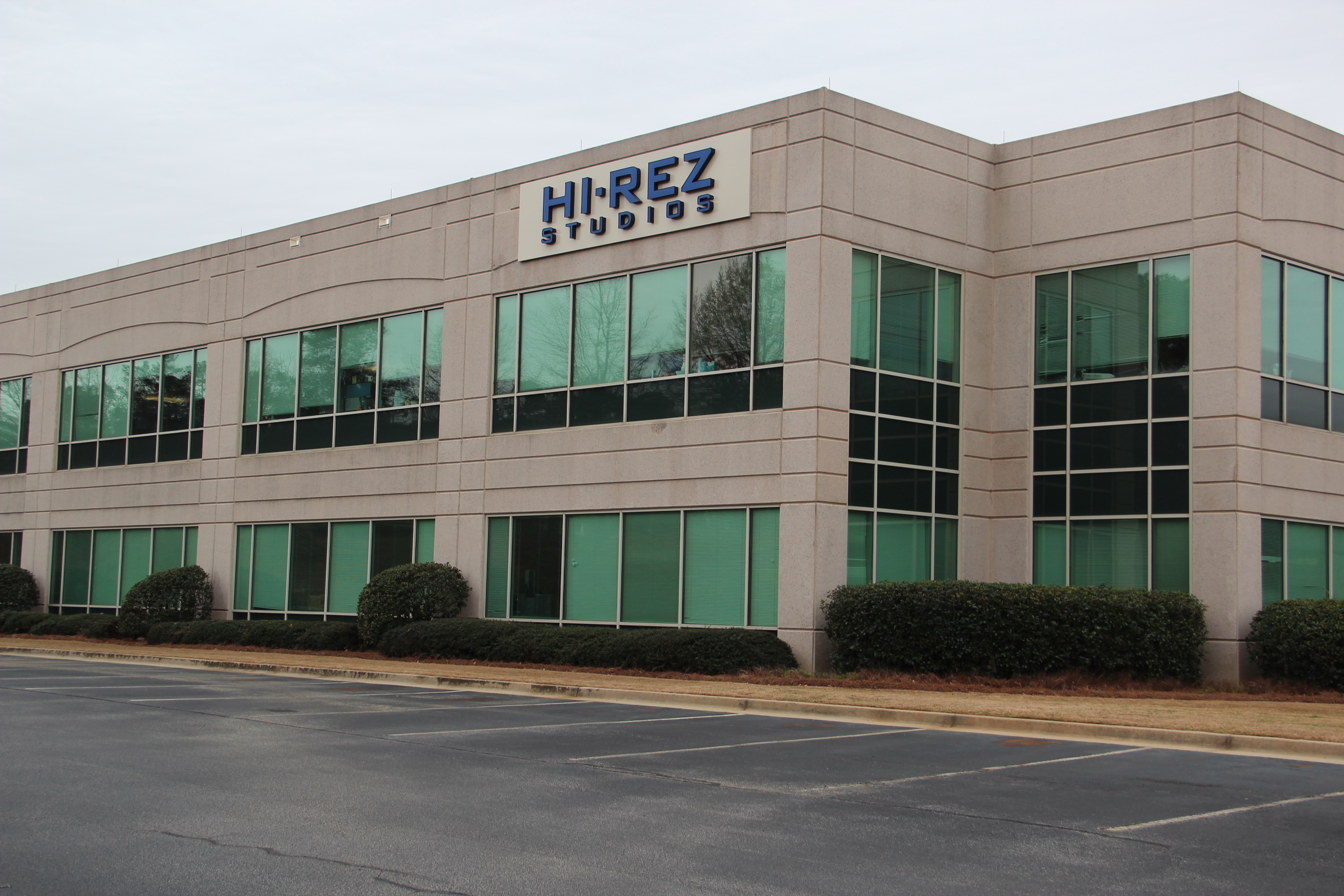
- Type: Private
- Industry: Video games
- Founded: 2005; 21 years ago
- Headquarters: Alpharetta, Georgia, US
- Key people: Erez Goren; Stew Chisam (CEO)
- Products: Global Agenda; Tribes: Ascend; Smite; Paladins; Rogue Company; Realm Royale
- Subsidiaries: Alacrity Arthouse; Evil Mojo Games; First Watch Games; Red Beard Games; Titan Forge Games
- Website: hirezstudios.com

Hi-Rez Studios is an American video game developer and publisher. The company was established in 2005 by Erez Goren and Todd Harris. Hi-Rez Studios' games include the squad-based shooter Global Agenda, the critically acclaimed Tribes: Ascend, the third-person MOBA Smite, the hero shooter Paladins, and the third-person shooter Rogue Company. In 2012, Hi-Rez Studios was recognized as a Top 30 Video-Game Developer by Game Developer Magazine and Gamasutra. Hi-Rez are the current owners of the Metaltech license, including Battledrome, Earthsiege, Starsiege, the CyberStorm series, and the Tribes series. With the exception of Battledrome and CyberStorm, the games were released as freeware by Hi-Rez on October 30, 2015.

== History ==
Erez Goren founded Hi-Rez Studios with Todd Harris in 2005. They hired experienced game developers from other successful titles, including City of Heroes, The Elder Scrolls IV: Oblivion, and Call of Duty. Hi-Rez Studios employs more than 450 people at its development facility in the northern Atlanta suburb of Alpharetta, Seattle, and Brighton in the UK. In August 2018, the company split into four separate studios: Titan Forge (responsible for SMITE development), Evil Mojo (responsible for Paladins development), Heroic Leap (responsible for Realm Royale development. This studio later merged with Evil Mojo), and Alacrity Arthouse (responsible for Centralized Art Services).

In 2019, Hi-Rez Studios announced the creation of a new studio, Red Beard Games, based in the Brighton office.

== Games developed ==
Year (Note: Year of first release, game might have released on other platforms at a later date)	Title	Platform(s)	Notes
2010	Global Agenda	Microsoft Windows	Servers shut down in 2018; Servers Reopened in 2022
2012	Tribes: Ascend	Microsoft Windows	Development stopped in July 2013, resumed Dec 2015 with a final update on Sep 29, 2016
2014	Smite	Microsoft Windows, macOS, Xbox One, PlayStation 4, Nintendo Switch	Closed beta started in 2012
2016	Jetpack Fighter	iOS, Android	Removed from stores sometime in 2019
2017	Smite Rivals	Microsoft Windows, iOS, Android	Entered beta in January 2017, cancelled in March 2017.
2018	Hand of the Gods: Smite Tactics	Microsoft Windows, Xbox One, PlayStation 4	Servers shut down on Jan 1st, 2020
2018	Paladins Strike	iOS, Android	Servers shut down in late 2020
2018	Paladins	Microsoft Windows, macOS, Xbox One, PlayStation 4, Nintendo Switch	Following layoffs at Evil Mojo, active development of Paladins as a whole was halted on February 6, 2025.
2018	Realm Royale	Microsoft Windows, PlayStation 4, Xbox One, Nintendo Switch	Servers shut down on February 17th, 2025
2019	Smite Blitz	iOS, Android	Co-developed with Stoneskin Games. Soft launched in September 2019, servers shut down in October 2020.
2020	Rogue Company	Microsoft Windows, PlayStation 4, Xbox One, Nintendo Switch, Xbox Series X/S, PlayStation 5	
2020	Prophecy	Windows	Released in Early Access in May 2020, shut down on June 29, 2020. Was developed under Hi-Rez Games license by Prophecy Games (team made of ex Hi-Rez developers).
2022	Divine Knockout	Microsoft Windows, PlayStation 4, Xbox One, Xbox Series X/S, PlayStation 5	Servers shut down on February 17th, 2025
2024	Smite 2	Microsoft Windows, PlayStation 5, Xbox Series X/S, Steam Deck	

=== Global Agenda ===
Global Agenda is an online team-based game. The game went live on February 1, 2010. In April 2011, Global Agenda became the first free-to-play game released on the Steam platform, introducing Elite and Free Agents and an in-game cash shop featuring Agenda Points.

=== Tribes Universe ===
Tribes Universe was a multiplayer arena shooter developed by Hi-Rez Studios based on the Tribes series. The game, along with Hi-Rez Studios' Tribes intellectual property acquisition from InstantAction, was first announced on October 23, 2010. While alpha testing was said to begin at the start of 2011, development on Tribes Universe was canceled when Hi-Rez Studios decided to start working on Tribes: Ascend.

=== Tribes: Ascend ===
Tribes: Ascend is a free-to-play multiplayer-only first-person shooter and part of the Tribes franchise. It was announced by Hi-Rez Studios on March 11, 2011, at the PAX East, and released on April 12, 2012. Tribes: Ascend earned a metascore of 86, and PC Gamer ranked it at #8 in an article on the Best Shooters of All Time. Aspects from previous Tribes games such as jetpacks and skiing are featured in the game.

Hi-Rez Studios representative Todd Harris announced the company's abandonment of the game on July 12, 2013.

=== Smite ===
Smite is a free-to-play third-person MOBA for Microsoft Windows, Xbox One, PlayStation 4, Nintendo Switch, and OS X. Players take on the visage of mythological deities from different pantheons and take part in arena combat, using powers and team tactics against other player-controlled deities and non-player controlled minions. Hi-Rez Studios announced Smite on April 21, 2011, at PAX East, and began its closed beta period on May 31, 2012, for PC. An open beta followed on January 24, 2013. The beta process produced more than 74 million hours of playtime and a large competitive community. Throughout the beta, Hi-Rez Studios also hosted a series of LAN and online events with cash prize pools. Smite was officially released in North America and Western Europe on March 25, 2014, for the PC. On August 19, 2015, Hi-Rez Studios released the Xbox One version, and on May 31, 2016, the PlayStation 4 version was released. On February 19, 2019, the Nintendo Switch version was released.

=== Paladins ===
Paladins is a free-to-play online team-based game. The player has to pick a champion each with unique abilities to fight. There are four types of groups: Damage, Support, Flank and Front Line. The current version of the card system permits pre-designed loadouts that provide augments to various abilities and stats, as well as “items" that can be purchased by credits. To get credits the player has to play and fight others. Items can be upgraded mid-match to provide additional performance bonuses.The game was announced on August 5, 2015. Paladins went into open beta on September 16, 2016, and released on Steam as an early access title the same day.

=== Rogue Company ===
Rogue Company is a free-to-play multiplayer third-person shooter video game developed by First Watch Games. Rogue Company entered closed beta in June 2020 on Nintendo Switch, PlayStation 4, Xbox One, and on Microsoft Windows via the Epic Games Store, and included full support for cross-platform play and cross-progression.

=== Jetpack Fighter ===
Jetpack Fighter is a free-to-play high speed platformer for mobile. The game was released first for iOS on January 7, 2016, and Apple editors featured it as a Best New Game. As of July 27, 2016, the game has been released on Android. The game has earned a metascore of 83.

=== Divine Knockout ===
Divine Knockout (DKO, for short) was a third-person platform fighter developed by Red Beard Games, in Brighton. DKO started its closed Alpha in early 2022 and on November 22, 2022, announced that the game release date is going to be December 6 where the game is going to be available for PC (through Steam and Epic), Xbox One and Series X|S, PlayStation 4 and 5. On November 30, 2022, Hi-Rez announced a partnership with PlayStation, where Divine Knockout's Founders Edition is included with PlayStation Plus during the month of December, 2022. The game was released on Steam, Epic Games Store, PlayStation, and Xbox on December 6, 2022. Currently there is no dev working on the game. The developers announced game servers will be shut down on February 17, 2025.
