= CyberStorm 2: Corporate Wars =

1998 video game

- Developer(s): Dynamix
- Publisher(s): Sierra On-Line
- Producer(s): Neil Haldar
- Designer(s): Graeme Bayless
- Programmer(s): Stephen Cordon
- Artist(s): Mary Ann Fernandes
- Platform(s): Microsoft Windows
- Release: NA: June 4, 1998; EU: 1998
- Genre(s): Turn-based tactics, Real-time strategy
- Mode(s): Single-player, multiplayer

CyberStorm 2: Corporate Wars is a turn-based and real-time strategy game developed by Dynamix and released in 1998 as a sequel to MissionForce: CyberStorm. It was published by Sierra On-Line.

== Plot ==
CyberStorm 2 takes place long after the events of the first game, with the Cybrids no longer representing a major threat.

A jumpgate has been discovered in the Typheous system, and eight Earth corporations want to control it. Each of them therefore starts up a branch in the system, and begin to battle it out with the latest in military technology.

== Gameplay ==
The game is played from a top-down isometric view-perspective. In some respects it is similar to MissionForce: CyberStorm, using many of the same graphical assets, although several changes to the gameplay has been made.

There are two modes of play: turn-based and real-time. The player begins by choosing which corporation they want to work for, each of which has their own strengths and weaknesses in different areas, such as finances, engineering and bioengineering as well as military capability.

The player progresses through a selection of random missions, with special missions becoming available from time to time. These are written scenarios and tend to be quite profitable. The eventual goal is to take over the entire system by defeating all rival companies.

=== Corporate mechanics ===
HERC Base in CyberStorm 2

There are other changes to the game mechanics as well: the player is now responsible for maintaining almost everything, from research allocation (needed to develop new weapons and other technologies), to base construction and defenses. Essentially, the player is in charge of a subsidiary of the parent corporation.

The player must secure all income for the base by setting up mines, either by finding unclaimed mining areas or destroying mining operations of rival corporations. Although the player can earn money on mission rewards, steady income only comes from the number of mines that the player can keep up.

Only steady income can be allocated to research. The player determines how fast the technology levels of weapons, armor, shielding, life support, sensors, etc. will progress by allocating funds to the various sections of research and the technology level of their command building in the base.

The player must also maintain the base. Options include improving the technology levels of the buildings, which make them harder to destroy and give them improved capabilities (command center controls research ability, vehicle bay technology level limits the types of units that can be built, launch pad limits the number of units that can be sent off world, turrets' technology level controls their firepower).

=== Combat ===
Combat in CyberStorm 2

The player may command only four to eight units on the battlefield at a time (the number depending upon which corporation they are aligned with). The player's units are dropped onto the battlefield to fight either rival corporations or the occasional Cybrid group. The player has many choices of units for their force, including:

- "HERCs" (shortened form of HERCULAN: Humaniform-Emulation Roboticized Combat Unit with Leg-Articulated Navigation): these are the walking giant robots of the game. HERCs move somewhat slower than other units but are able to jump up and down terrain levels. HERCs always turn to face their target. Most of the HERCs from the first game are available, as well as several new models.
- Tanks: Ground-based tanks have a turret which rotates and tracks the enemy. This is a substantial difference from the other units, since ground tanks need not turn their bodies to fire at their target. Shield focus still moves with the body, not the turret.
- Grav Tanks: Gravitiational drive tanks hover, are very fast, and are not limited by terrain. However, the armament, armor, and shielding of grav tanks tend to be far inferior to ground tanks or HERCs. Grav tanks have no turret, and always turn to face their target.

Gameplay involves destroying buildings and/or enemy units. Buildings (including turrets) are unshielded, but can have very heavy and effective armor. Enemy units have shields and armor to defend them. Typically, the player must knock down one of the eight shield facings to create a hole using weapons that are effective against shields (usually energy weapons), then use weapons that are effective against armor to finish off the unit (usually ballistic weapons). Alternatively, some weapons can pass through shields, either partially or completely, to damage the armor underneath.

CyberStorm 2 mapping is based upon a grid system rather than the hexagonal one used in the first game. This gives units eight directions of facing (four box sides, plus four corners), and shields are now octagonal in shape to work with the new map layout.

== Development ==
The game went gold on April 28, 1998.

== Reviews ==
- The Duelist #34
