= MissionForce: CyberStorm =

1996 video game

- Developer: Dynamix
- Publisher: Sierra On-Line
- Producer: Graeme Bayless
- Designers: John Garvin; Graeme Bayless; Don McClure; Robert Kraft; Stephen Cordon
- Programmer: Stephen Cordon
- Artists: John Garvin; Mike Jahnke; Shawn Sharp
- Writer: Robert Kraft
- Platform: Microsoft Windows
- Release: NA: June 27, 1996; EU: 1996
- Genre: Turn-based tactics
- Modes: Single-player, multiplayer

MissionForce: CyberStorm (commonly referred to as CyberStorm) is a turn-based strategy game developed by Dynamix and published in 1996 by Sierra On-Line. The game is set in the Metaltech universe created by Dynamix, and the player control units of HERCULANs (Humaniform-Emulation Roboticized Combat Unit with Leg-Articulated Navigation): bipedal warmachines of varying size and construct, more commonly known as HERCs. Although CyberStorm was a limited commercial success, it sold well enough to spawn a 1998 sequel called CyberStorm 2: Corporate Wars. It was digitally released by Activision on July 23, 2019 on GOG.com.

== Plot ==
The player starts as an employee of the Unitech Corporation, serving as a commander of a private military taskforce to fight a race of mechanical beings mankind created long ago called Cybrids. The game's fictional universe is explained via messages and text between missions. The corporate environment is cold and ruthless, with military decisions being controlled by a computer system called the Main Synthetic Intelligence (MSI). Early on in the game, one of the corporate communiques implies that Unitech can and will execute any of its military officers if they fail to deliver profits. This is confirmed if the player ever loses the game by having his or her forces eliminated down to the last HERC without having enough credits to replace them.

The player's soldiers are "BioDerms", short-lived, artificially-created humanoids designed to pilot the HERC war machines. The BioDerms are supposedly used because of their genetically engineered reflexes, their ability to be directly "linked" to the HERCs, and their obedience. The instructions and early parts of the game indicate that these BioDerms are sub-human, more like trained dogs, but later communiques show that they are intelligent, can think independently (and even rebel), and even think of one model as a "messiah". Thus, the BioDerms are actually slaves: disposable synthetic humans to be used on the battlefield and "recycled" for a few credits or blown up in kamikaze attacks by corporate officers when they are no longer useful. BioDerm templates are created using the genetic material of past HERC pilots and commanders; one early communique describes the horror of having one's genes taken to create BioDerms, and if the player wins the game, Unitech makes it clear that they will in fact do that with the player's avatar, that it is an "honor", and there is no choice.

== Gameplay ==
Command screen showing hexagon based movement path

By completing missions and progressing, the player gains rank in order to get access to more advanced equipment and hardware, as well as being able to control more HERCs. Missions can be selected from a list of Cybrid-controlled planets within a specified system.

The game is played from a top-down isometric view-perspective typical for turn-based strategy games. The player gets credits for every enemy they destroy as well as a mission bonus dependent on the difficulty of the mission. However, in the beginning of the game, the primary source of income is through mining ore, which can be found scattered across the maps. All HERCs can be outfitted with an "ore extractor" which, when activated, collects all mineable ore in the hexagon where the machine is standing.

All maps and enemy locations are randomly generated, meaning no two playthroughs will be the same. The campaign as a whole, however, is not dynamic; player success or failure does not affect upcoming battles beyond the strength of the player's forces.

In between missions, the player manages HERCs and pilots in the HERC Base. From here, the player can create, train, assign or "recycle" BioDerms. The player also has the opportunity to purchase, repair, customize and upgrade HERCs with a wide range of equipment, for instance by adding more advanced life-support to increase BioDerm survival rate, better shields, different armor, or fitting more powerful weapons to the chassis.

== Reception and legacy ==
Reception

Review score
Publication	Score
GameSpot	8.9/10

The game was generally well received by reviewers and gamers alike. GameSpot wrote: "Sierra has taken a basic, turn-based strategy game and added some beautiful graphics, fantastic sound, and great network play" and gave it the rating "great" with a score of 8.9 out of 10. In 1996, Computer Gaming World listed "the flesh burning off the bioderms" as #12 on its list of "the 15 best ways to die in computer gaming". Strategy Plus Magazine wrote a positive review, and a line from it: "Early contender for best Strategy game of 1996" is cited on the game's packaging. In late 1996 a patch released by Sierra added two new game modes: Hotseat and Play-by-EMail.

Andy Butcher reviewed MissionForce: CyberStorm for Arcane magazine, rating it an 8 out of 10 overall, and stated that "CyberStorm is excellent, and will be a tough act to follow for any other strategy-based 'big robot' game. Fans of BattleTech, Heavy Gear and Mekton Z will find lots to enjoy here, as will anyone with a PC and an interest in strategy or wargames."

MissionForce was named the 53rd best computer game ever by PC Gamer UK in 1997. The editors called it a "compelling strategy game".
