= 2015 in video games =

The year 2015 saw releases of numerous video games as well as a follow-up to Nintendo's portable 3DS console, the New Nintendo 3DS. Top-rated games originally released in 2015 included Madden NFL 16, NBA 2K16, NBA Live 16, WWE 2K16, Metal Gear Solid V: The Phantom Pain, The Witcher 3: Wild Hunt, Bloodborne, Undertale, and Fallout 4. Sales of video games in 2015 reached $61 billion, according to analysis firm SuperData, an 8% increase from 2014. Of this, the largest sector was in computer game sales and subscription services, accounting for $32 billion. Mobile games revenues were at $25.1 billion, a 10% increase from 2014. Digital sales on consoles made up the remaining $4 billion.

Series with new installments in 2015 include Anno, Assassin's Creed, Batman: Arkham, Battlefield, Call of Duty, Disgaea, Dirt, Fallout, Fatal Frame, Five Nights at Freddy's, Forza Motorsport, Guitar Hero, Halo, Heroes of Might and Magic, Hotline Miami, Just Cause, King's Quest, Kirby, Magicka, Mario Party, Mario vs. Donkey Kong, Mario & Luigi, Metal Gear, Minecraft, Mortal Kombat, Need for Speed, OlliOlli, Resident Evil, Rock Band, StarCraft, Star Wars: Battlefront, Tales, The Witcher, Tomb Raider, Tom Clancy's Rainbow Six, Tony Hawk's Pro Skater, Total War, Toy Soldiers, Xenoblade, Yakuza and Yoshi.

In addition, 2015 saw the introduction of several new properties, including Bloodborne, Dying Light, Evolve, Life Is Strange, Ori, Rocket League, Splatoon, Undertale, and Until Dawn.

== Financial performance ==
In the United States, the Entertainment Software Association (ESA) and the NPD Group estimated total video game market revenues at $23.5 billion, a 5% increase from 2014. Of this, the total software market was $16.5 billion, with the NPD Group estimating retail sales subset at $13.1 billion. The ESA reported that there were 2,457 companies in the United States involved in developing or publishing video games that directly supported 65,678 workers (37,122 in developing, 28,556 in publishing) with about another 154,000 indirectly supporting the industry, such as through contracting or video game journalism. The total contribution to the US's gross national product from the industry was $11.7 billion.

In the United Kingdom, the total video game market was valued at nearly £4.2 billion, according to figures from Ukie and MCV. The largest segments were in digital software (£1.2 billion) and mobile games (£664 million), while sales of consoles dropped to £689 million.

=== Highest-grossing games ===
The following were 2015's top ten highest-grossing video games in terms of worldwide revenue (including physical sales, digital purchases, subscriptions, microtransactions, free-to-play and pay-to-play) across all platforms (including mobile, PC and console platforms). Three of the top ten highest-grossing games are published or owned by Tencent, including the top-grossing title League of Legends.

Rank	Game	Revenue	Publisher(s)	Genre	Platform(s)	Business model	Ref.
1	League of Legends	$1,628,000,000	Riot Games / Tencent	MOBA	PC	Free-to-play	
2	Monster Strike	$1,557,800,000	Mixi	Physics	Mobile	Free-to-play	(Note: Monster Strike: January–March – $333.8 million; April–December – $1.224 billion)
3	Clash of Clans	$1,345,000,000	Supercell (SoftBank Group)	Strategy	Mobile	Free-to-play	
4	Puzzle & Dragons	$1,290,000,000	GungHo Online Entertainment (SoftBank Group)	Puzzle	Mobile	Free-to-play	
5	Crossfire	$1,110,000,000	Smilegate / Tencent	FPS	PC	Free-to-play	
6	Dungeon Fighter Online	$1,052,000,000	Neople (Nexon) / Tencent	Beat 'em up	PC	Free-to-play	
7	Call of Duty: Black Ops III	$1,000,000,000	Activision (Activision Blizzard)	FPS	PC, Console	Buy-to-play	
8	World of Warcraft	$814,000,000	Blizzard Entertainment (Activision Blizzard)	MMORPG	PC	Subscription	
9	Game of War: Fire Age	$799,000,000	MZ	Strategy	Mobile	Free-to-play	
10	Fallout 4	$750,000,000	Bethesda Softworks (ZeniMax Media)	Action RPG	PC, Console	Buy-to-play	

=== Best-selling games ===
Rank	Japan (retail)	United Kingdom (retail)	United States (retail)	Steam (digital)
1	Monster Hunter X	FIFA 16	Call of Duty: Black Ops III	Grand Theft Auto V
2	Yo-kai Watch Blasters	Call of Duty: Black Ops III	Madden NFL 16	Fallout 4
3	Animal Crossing: Happy Home Designer	Fallout 4	Fallout 4	Ark: Survival Evolved
4	Splatoon	Star Wars Battlefront	Star Wars Battlefront	Rocket League
5	Dragon Quest VIII	Grand Theft Auto V	Grand Theft Auto V	Just Survive
6	Fire Emblem Fates	Batman: Arkham Knight	NBA 2K16	Cities: Skylines
7	Rhythm Heaven: The Best Plus	FIFA 15	Minecraft	Besiege
8	Super Mario Maker	Call of Duty: Advanced Warfare	FIFA 16	The Witcher 3: Wild Hunt
9	Dragon Quest Heroes	Assassin's Creed Syndicate	Mortal Kombat X	Dying Light
10	The Legend of Zelda: Majora's Mask 3D	Lego Jurassic World	Call of Duty: Advanced Warfare	Life Is Strange

== Top-rated games ==
=== Critically acclaimed titles ===
Metacritic (MC) and GameRankings (GR) are aggregators of video game journalism reviews.

2015 games and expansions scoring at least 90/100 (MC) or 90% (GR)
Game	Publisher	Release Date	Platform	MC score	GR score
Grand Theft Auto V	Rockstar Games	April 14, 2015	WIN	96/100	95.07%
Out of the Park Baseball 16	Out of the Park Developments	March 23, 2015	WIN	91/100	95.25%
Metal Gear Solid V: The Phantom Pain	Konami	September 1, 2015	XBO	95/100	90.38%
Journey	Sony Computer Entertainment	July 21, 2015	PS4	92/100	94.8%
Undertale	Toby Fox	September 15, 2015	WIN	92/100	94.11%
Divinity: Original Sin Enhanced Edition	Larian Studios	October 27, 2015	WIN	94/100	90%
Mario Kart 8 DLC Pack 2	Nintendo	April 23, 2015	WiiU	90/100	93.5%
The Swapper	Curve Studios	June 5, 2015	XBO	92/100	93.33%
The Witcher 3: Wild Hunt	CD Projekt	May 19, 2015	WIN	93/100	92.11%
Metal Gear Solid V: The Phantom Pain	Konami	September 1, 2015	PS4	93/100	91.59%
Metal Gear Solid V: The Phantom Pain	Konami	September 1, 2015	WIN	91/100	92.75%
The Witcher 3: Wild Hunt	CD Projekt	May 19, 2015	PS4	92/100	92.23%
Bloodborne	Sony Computer Entertainment	March 24, 2015	PS4	92/100	90.66%
Shovel Knight	Yacht Club Games	April 21, 2015	PSV	92/100	90.4%
The Witcher 3: Wild Hunt – Hearts of Stone	CD Projekt	October 13, 2015	PS4	90/100	91.19%
The Witcher 3: Wild Hunt	CD Projekt	May 19, 2015	XBO	91/100	90.7%
Shovel Knight	Yacht Club Games	April 21, 2015	PS4	90/100	91%
The Witcher 3: Wild Hunt – Hearts of Stone	CD Projekt	October 13, 2015	XBO	90/100	91%
80 Days	Inkle	September 29, 2015	WIN	84/100	91%
Shovel Knight: Plague of Shadows	Yacht Club Games	September 17, 2015	WIN	89/100	90.5%
Nuclear Throne	Vlambeer	December 5, 2015	WIN	88/100	90.43%
The Legend of Zelda: Majora's Mask 3D	Nintendo	February 13, 2015	3DS	89/100	90.39%
Tales from the Borderlands: Episode 5 – The Vault of the Traveler	Telltale Games	October 20, 2015	PS4	90/100	89.89%
Broken Age	Double Fine Productions	April 28, 2015	PSV	90/100	89%
Roche Fusion	amulware	January 23, 2015	WIN	85/100	90%
Odallus: The Dark Call	Joymasher	July 15, 2015	WIN	80/100	90%

=== Major awards ===
Category/Organization		33rd Golden Joystick Awards October 30, 2015	The Game Awards 2015 December 3, 2015	19th Annual D.I.C.E. Awards February 18, 2016	16th Game Developers Choice Awards March 17, 2016	12th British Academy Games Awards April 7, 2016	
Game of the Year		The Witcher 3: Wild Hunt		Fallout 4	The Witcher 3: Wild Hunt	Fallout 4	
Independent / Debut (Note: Certain award presentations combine these categories.)		Kerbal Space Program	Rocket League		Ori and the Blind Forest	Her Story	
Mobile/Handheld	Mobile	Fallout Shelter	Lara Croft Go	Fallout Shelter	Her Story		
Mobile/Handheld	Handheld	Fallout Shelter	Lara Croft Go	Helldivers	Her Story		
Innovation		First-person mode in Grand Theft Auto V	—N/a		Her Story		
Artistic Achievement	Animation	The Witcher 3: Wild Hunt	Ori and the Blind Forest	Ori and the Blind Forest	Ori and the Blind Forest		
Artistic Achievement	Art Direction	The Witcher 3: Wild Hunt	Ori and the Blind Forest	Ori and the Blind Forest	Ori and the Blind Forest		
Audio	Music	Ori and the Blind Forest	Metal Gear Solid V: The Phantom Pain	Ori and the Blind Forest	Crypt of the NecroDancer	Everybody's Gone to the Rapture	
Audio	Sound Design	Ori and the Blind Forest	—N/a	Star Wars Battlefront	Crypt of the NecroDancer	Everybody's Gone to the Rapture	
Character or Performance		Ashly Burch as Chloe Price; Life Is Strange	Viva Seifert as Hannah Smith; Her Story	Lara Croft; Rise of the Tomb Raider	—N/a	Merle Dandridge as Kate Collins; Everybody's Gone to the Rapture	
Game Direction or Design	Game Design	—N/a		The Witcher 3: Wild Hunt	Rocket League	Bloodborne	
Game Direction or Design	Game Direction	—N/a		Fallout 4	Rocket League	Bloodborne	
Narrative		The Witcher 3: Wild Hunt	Her Story	The Witcher 3: Wild Hunt	Her Story	Life Is Strange	
Technical Achievement		—N/a		The Witcher 3: Wild Hunt		—N/a	
Multiplayer/Online		Grand Theft Auto Online	Splatoon	Rocket League	—N/a	Rocket League	
Action/Shooter		—N/a	Splatoon	Star Wars Battlefront	—N/a		
Adventure		—N/a	Metal Gear Solid V: The Phantom Pain		—N/a		
Family		Splatoon	Super Mario Maker		—N/a	Rocket League	
Fighting		—N/a	Mortal Kombat X		—N/a		
Role-Playing		—N/a	The Witcher 3: Wild Hunt	Fallout 4	—N/a		
Sports/Racing	Sports	—N/a	Rocket League	Rocket League	—N/a	Rocket League	
Sports/Racing	Racing	—N/a	Rocket League	Forza Motorsport 6	—N/a	Rocket League	
Strategy/Simulation		—N/a		Heroes of the Storm	—N/a		
Special Award		Lifetime Achievement	Industry Icon Award	Hall of Fame	Lifetime Achievement Award	BAFTA Special	BAFTA Fellowship
Special Award		Satoru Iwata	Brett Sperry and Louis Castle	Hideo Kojima	Todd Howard	Amy Hennig	John Carmack

== Major events ==
Date	Event	Ref.
January 7	Zombie Studios, the creator of the Spec Ops series, was shut down.	
January 23–25	PAX South 2015 held in Henry B. Gonzalez Convention Center	
January 30	Sega continues reduction of western businesses and focus on digital that began in 2012.	
February 3	Sony sold Sony Online Entertainment to Columbus Nova. The company was renamed into Daybreak Game Company.	
February 3	Video game critic Joystiq was shut down by AOL.	
February 19	Sega Networks, a subsidiary of Sega, acquired Demiurge Studios.	
February 20	tri-Ace, the developer of Star Ocean and Valkyrie Profile, was acquired by Nepro Japan.	
February 25	The website version of video game critic Computer and Video Games was merged into GamesRadar+ by Future plc.	
March 2–6	Game Developers Conference 2015 held in San Francisco, California.	
March 2–6	Independent Games Festival held in San Francisco, California.	
March 4	Electronic Arts shut down the headquarters of Maxis in Emeryville, which has created franchises such as SimCity and Spore.	
March 6–8	PAX East 2015 held at the Boston Convention and Exhibition Center.	
March 12–14	EGX Rezzed 2015 held at the Tobacco Dock, London.	
March 17	Nintendo Co. Ltd. announced their affiliation with Japanese mobile game developer DeNA and teased the NX (the then-unnamed Nintendo Switch) as a new platform.	
March 23	Raven Software celebrated its 25th anniversary.	
April 1	Bandai Namco Games was renamed into Bandai Namco Entertainment.	
April 15	2K Australia, the developer of Borderlands: The Pre-Sequel was shut down by Take-Two Interactive.	
April 17	Phil Harrison, the World Wide Corporate Vice President of Microsoft Studios departed from Microsoft.	
April 20	Matthew Armstrong, creator of the Borderlands series, left Gearbox Software.	
April 27	Following the cancellation of Silent Hills, Konami delisted itself from the New York Stock Exchange.	
April 30	Services of OnLive were discontinued as the asset was acquired by Sony Computer Entertainment.	
May 4	Spark Unlimited, the developer of Lost Planet 3 and Call of Duty: Finest Hour was shut down.	
May 22	BioWare celebrated its 20th anniversary.	
May 22	The Pac-Man franchise celebrated its 35th anniversary in Japan.	
May 26	Oskari Häkkinen, head of franchise development of Remedy Entertainment, left Remedy.	
June 3	CEO of Remedy Entertainment, Matias Myllyrinne, departed from the company for Wargaming.	
June 8	Paul Sams replaced Ru Weerasuriya as Ready at Dawn's CEO.	
June 9	Chris Avellone, co-founder of Obsidian Entertainment, departed from the company.	
June 11	Housemarque celebrated its 20th anniversary.	
June 12	Arc System Works purchased the rights to develop video games for the Double Dragon, River City Ransom, and Super Dodge Ball series from the now-defunct Technos.	
June 16–18	E3 2015 held at the Los Angeles Convention Center.	
June 16	Square Enix unveiled new studio Tokyo RPG Factory.	
June 21	Tale of Tales, the developer of Sunset, was closed down.	
June 24	People Can Fly, formerly Epic Games Poland, was split from Epic Games. It became an independent studio and acquired the Bulletstorm IP.	
June 29	Disney Infinity publisher Disney Interactive was merged with Disney Consumer Products, the developer of Playmation to form a new division called "Disney Consumer Products and Interactive Media"	
June 30	Club Nintendo was discontinued in North America.	
July 4–5	MineCon has been held at the ExCeL London Exhibition and Conference Centre.	
July 11	Satoru Iwata, President and CEO of Nintendo, died at age 55.	
July 13	Electronic Arts formed new studio called EA Motive. The studio is led by former Ubisoft director Jade Raymond.	
July 17–19	SGC 2015 to be held at the Embassy Suites Frisco Hotel & Convention Centre.	
July 22	John Smedley stepped down as Daybreak Game Company's President and CEO.	
July 23–26	QuakeCon 2015 to be held in Dallas, Texas.	
July 27	China's government fully lifts the ban on the sales of video game consoles within the country.	
July 27	Razer Inc. acquired all the software assets of Ouya.	
July 29	Windows 10 was released.	
July 29	Yager Development filed for insolvency for its production division Yager Productions GmbH	
August 5–9	Gamescom 2015 was held in Cologne, Germany.	
August 21	Remedy Entertainment celebrated its 20th anniversary.	
August 26	Google releases the YouTube Gaming app.	
August 28–31	PAX Prime to be held in Seattle, Washington.	
September 2	2015 GameStop Expo at The Venetian Las Vegas resort.	
September 13	The Super Mario series celebrated its 30th anniversary in Japan.	
September 14	Tatsumi Kimishima is appointed president of Nintendo after the death of Satoru Iwata in July 2015. Nintendo EAD and Nintendo SPD was merged, forming Nintendo Entertainment Planning & Development.	
September 15	Sony announced that Project Morpheus was renamed into PlayStation VR.	
September 17–20	Tokyo Game Show 2015 at the Makuhari Messe in Tokyo.	
September 24	Maxis was reassigned to the EA Mobile division of Electronic Arts.	
September 24–27	EGX 2015 at the NEC in Birmingham, UK.	
September 30	Club Nintendo was discontinued in Europe and Japan.	
September 30	Twisted Pixel Games was separated from Microsoft Studios and became an independent studio again.	
October 2	Microsoft purchased Havok from Intel.	
October 2–4	EGS was held at Centro Banamex in Mexico City.	
October 3	FiraxiCon was held by Firaxis Games at the Baltimore Convention Center in Maryland.	
October 6	Ubisoft acquired The Crew's developer Ivory Tower.	
October 8–12	Brasil Game Show 2015 held in Expo Center Norte, São Paulo, Brasil.	
October 11–13	Firstlook Festival 2015 at Jaarbeurs Utrecht in Utrecht, Netherlands.	
October 13	Ubisoft acquired Longtail Studios and renamed it to Ubisoft Halifax.	
October 28	Paris Games Week in Paris, France.	
October 29	Paradox Interactive purchased White Wolf Publishing and all its assets, including World of Darkness and Vampire: The Masquerade from CCP Games.	
November 2	Activision Blizzard acquired Candy Crush Saga developer King for $5.9 billion.	
November 4	Konami shuttered its Los Angeles division.	
November 6–7	BlizzCon 2015 at Anaheim Convention Center in Anaheim, California.	
November 6	Activision Blizzard established a new TV and film studio Activision Blizzard Studios.	
November 6	2K China closed by Take-Two Interactive. Their next game, Borderlands Online was cancelled.	
November 6	NCSoft launched a new mobile division named Iron Tiger.	
November 12–15	G-STAR 2015 in Bexco, Busan, South Korea.	
December 3	The Game Awards 2015 held in Los Angeles, California.	
December 5–6	PlayStation Experience 2015 held in San Francisco, California.	
December 7	Flying Wild Hog opened a new studio in Kraków, Poland.	
December 9	A new development studio was established by Bethesda Game Studios in Montreal.	
December 10	Electronic Arts established Competitive Gaming Division, a new division headed by Peter Moore which focuses on ESports.	
December 11–13	GaymerX held at the San Jose Marriott Convention Center in San Jose, California.	
December 12	Gearbox Software opened new studio in Quebec.	
December 16	Crystal Dynamics' studio head Darrell Gallagher left the company.	
December 16	Kojima Productions was reestablished as an independent studio headed by Hideo Kojima.	

== Notable deaths ==
- January 25, 2015 – Colin Wyckoff, 20, Garry's Mod YouTuber known online as kitty0706.
- February 1, 2015 – Monty Oum, 33, animator for Midway Games and Afro Samurai.
- June 7, 2015 – Christopher Lee, 93, voice actor best known for the character Saruman in the "Lord of the Rings" film franchise and its video game tie-ins.
- July 11, 2015 – Satoru Iwata, 55, the fourth president and chief executive officer of Nintendo.
- July 31, 2015 – Roddy Piper, 61, pro wrestler and actor. Appeared in Abobo's Big Adventure, Saints Row IV, and numerous wrestling games including WWE 2K.

== Hardware releases ==
The following is a list of game-related hardware released in 2015.

The New Nintendo 3DS and New Nintendo 3DS XL made their launches in North America & Europe after initially releasing in Japan, Australia, & New Zealand the previous year.

Date	Console	Manufacturer	Ref.
January 6	New Nintendo 3DS^{EU} (Note: Initially released as an "Ambassador Edition" exclusive, released in retail on February 13, 2015.)	Nintendo	
February 13	New Nintendo 3DS XL^{NA/EU}	Nintendo	
April 29	Razer Forge TV	Razer Inc.	
May 28	Nvidia Shield TV	Nvidia	
November 27	Samsung Gear VR	Samsung	
September 10	New Nintendo 3DS^{KR}	Nintendo	
September 25	New Nintendo 3DS^{NA}	Nintendo	
November 10	Steam Controller (1st generation)	Valve Corporation	
November 10	Steam Link	Valve Corporation	
November 10	Steam Machine	Valve Corporation	

== Cancelled / discontinued video games ==
=== Cancelled ===
- Borderlands Online (WIN)
- Broforce (PSV)
- Dying Light (PS3, X360)
- Furious 4 (WIN, PS3, X360)
- Galak-Z: The Dimensional (PSV)
- Gone Home (WiiU)
- Human Element (WIN, PS4, XBO)
- Kaio: King of Pirates (3DS)
- Mad Max (PS3, X360)
- Mortal Kombat X (PS3, X360)
- Project CARS (WiiU)
- Scrolls (iOS)
- Shadow Realms (WIN)
- Silent Hills (PS4)
- The Black Glove

=== Discontinued ===
- Hellraid (PS4, XBO, WIN)
- Phantom Dust (XBO)

== Video game-based film and television releases ==
Title	Date	Type	Distributor	Franchise	Original game publisher	Ref.
Dead Rising: Watchtower	March 27, 2015	Feature film	Crackle	Dead Rising	Capcom	
Persona 3 The Movie: No. 3, Falling Down	April 4, 2015	Anime film	Aniplex	Persona	Atlus	
Talking Tom & Friends	April 30, 2015	3D animated webseries	YouTube	Talking Tom & Friends	Outfit7	
Hoopa and the Clash of Ages	July 18, 2015	Anime film	Toho	Pokémon	Game Freak	
Gamer's Guide to Pretty Much Everything	July 22, 2015	Television series	Disney XD	—N/a	—N/a	
Pixels	July 24, 2015	Feature film	Sony Pictures	Pixels	—N/a	
Game Shakers	September 12, 2015	Television series	Nickelodeon	—N/a	—N/a	
The Lost Arcade	November 14, 2015	Documentary film	26 Aries	—N/a	—N/a	

== See also ==
- 2015 in esports
- 2015 in games
