= 2015 in esports =

List of events in 2015 in esports (also known as professional gaming).

== Calendar of events ==
(for extended events the final date is listed)

Date	Game	Event	Location	Winner/s
January 6	Dota 2	i-League Season 2	China	LGD Gaming
January 9–11	Smite	Smite World Championship	Cobb Energy Performing Arts Center; Atlanta, Georgia, US	COGnitive Prime
January 30–February 1	Super Smash Bros. series numerous games	Apex 2015	Garden State Convention Center; Somerset, New Jersey, US	SuPeRbOoMfAn (Smash 64); PPMD (Melee); Ally (Brawl); ZeRo (Smash 4)
February 24–October 6	iRacing.com	NASCAR Peak Antifreeze Series	Online	Kenny Humpe
February 1–March 27	Dota 2	Major All Stars Dota 2 Tournament finals	Kuala Lumpur	Invictus Gaming
February 9	Dota 2	Dota 2 Asia Championships	Shanghai, China	Evil Geniuses
March 1	World of Tanks	Wargaming.net EU Gold Series Season 5 Finals	Sofia, Bulgaria	Kazna Kru
March 8	Halo 2: Anniversary	Halo Championship Series (HCS) Season 1 Finals (PAX East 2015)	Boston, Massachusetts	Evil Geniuses
March 15	StarCraft II; League of Legends	Intel Extreme Masters (IEM) Season IX Katowice	Katowice, Poland	SC2: Zest; LoL: Team SoloMid
March 15	Counter-Strike: Global Offensive	Electronic Sports League (ESL) One Katowice	Katowice	fnatic
March 27–29	Call of Duty: Advanced Warfare	Major League Gaming Call of Duty Championship	Los Angeles, California, US	Denial eSports
March 29	Counter-Strike: Global Offensive	Star Ladder StarSeries Season XII	Kyiv, Ukraine	Ninjas in Pyjamas
April 5	StarCraft II	2015 StarCraft II World Championship Series (WCS) Season 1	France	Polt
April 6	League of Legends	Vietnam Championship Series (VCS) Spring 2015	Vietnam (online)	Saigon Fantastic Five
April 6	numerous games	Gamers Assembly	Poitiers	(see article)
April 8	League of Legends	Challenger Series Spring Finals	Los Angeles	Enemy eSports
April 9	League of Legends	Tencent LoL Secondary Pro League 2015 Spring Finals	China	Qiao Gu
April 12	Dota 2	joinDOTA MLG Pro League Season 1	Columbus, Ohio	Team Empire
April 12	League of Legends	Garena Premier League (GPL) Spring 2015	Vietnam National Convention Center; Từ Liêm, Hanoi	Saigon Fantastic 5
April 11–26	Heroes of the Storm	Heroes of the Dorm	Shrine Auditorium; Los Angeles	University of California, Berkeley
May 2–3	Call of Duty: Advanced Warfare	Electronic Sports World Cup (ESWC 2015)	Zénith de Paris; Paris, France	OpTic Gaming
July 17–19	numerous fighting games	Evolution 2015	Bally's / Paris Las Vegas Casino; Las Vegas, Nevada, US	see main article
July ?-23	Halo 2: Anniversary	Halo Championship Series (HCS) Season 2 Finals	Burbank, California	Evil Geniuses
August 3–8	Dota 2	The International 2015	KeyArena; Seattle, Washington, US	Evil Geniuses
August 22–23	Counter-Strike: Global Offensive	ESL One Cologne 2015	Cologne, Germany	Fnatic
September 19–20	Counter-Strike: Global Offensive; Super Smash Bros. Melee	DreamHack London 2015	London, England, United Kingdom	
September 19–20	numerous games	DreamHack Stockholm 2015		
October 31	League of Legends	League of Legends World Championship grand finals	Mercedes-Benz Arena; Berlin, Germany	SK Telecom T1
November 7	Hearthstone: Heroes of Warcraft	Hearthstone World Championship 2015	Anaheim, California	Sebastian "Ostkaka" Engwall
November 26–29	Numerous games	DreamHack Winter 2015	Jönköping, Sweden	
December 2–5	Hearthstone: Heroes of Warcraft; League of Legends; StarCraft II: Legacy of the Void	IeSF E-Sports World Championship 2015	Seoul, South Korea	Team Serbia
December 4–6	Crossfire	Crossfire Stars (CFS) 2015 Grand Finals	Guangzhou, China	HG.LongZhu
December 6	Ultra Street Fighter IV	Capcom Cup 2015	Moscone Center; San Francisco, California, US	Kazunoko
