= Attach (gamer) =

American professional esports player

Personal information
- Name: Dillon Price
- Born: January 4, 1997 (age 29)
- Nationality: American

Career information
- Games: Call of Duty series

Team history
- 2013–2014: Team eLevate
- 2014: Team Curse
- 2014: Rise Nation
- 2014–2015: Denial eSports
- 2015–2019: FaZe Clan
- 2019: Evil Geniuses (Loan)
- 2020: New York Subliners
- 2021–2023: Minnesota RØKKR
- 2024: Vegas Legion
- 2025: Cloud9 New York

Career highlights and awards
- Call of Duty Championship champion (2015)

Dillon Price (born January 4, 1997), better known by his gamertag Attach, is an American content creator and retired professional Call of Duty player. He previously played for the Cloud9 New York, Vegas Legion, Minnesota RØKKR, New York Subliners, FaZe Clan, Rise Nation and Denial eSports. He won the Call of Duty Championship 2015 with Denial. He also runs an active YouTube channel.

== Career ==
Price started gaming as a child. He first heard about competitive Call of Duty from a friend that was on his travel baseball team and was playing GameBattles at the time. Price's first tournament was at MLG Anaheim 2013 where he placed 29th. After that, he placed 17th at UMG Dallas with Termination.

Once Call of Duty: Ghosts came around, Price joined Team eLevate. They took 8th place at UMG Philadelphia. Then at MLG X Games Invitational, he took home 5th place with Curse Orange. Then he joined Rise Nation where he would take 13th/16th at UMG Dallas. In November 2014 Price joined Denial.Switching from main AR to SMG

Price began the Advanced Warfare season playing under Denial after replacing StuDyy. Alongside ZooMaa, Saints, and Replays, he acquired a 5-6th placing at the first event, MLG Columbus 2014. The roster saw more success at UMG Orlando with a 3rd-place finish. In March, Denial won the 2015 Call of Duty Championships.

In June Price and Clayster left Denial and soon joined FaZe Clan.

Price is the youngest player to ever win the Call of Duty World Championship at the age of 18 years 84 days.

He joined the New York Subliners in September 2019.

In July 2020 while playing for the New York Subliners, Price won the New York Subliners Home Series.

Price joined the Minnesota ROKKR in September 2020. On August 1, 2021, at the Call Of Duty league Major 5 in Arlington, Texas, Price and the rest of the Minnesota ROKKR team made Call Of Duty history after being down 0-4 to Toronto Ultra and completing a reverse sweep to win 5-4 in a best of 9 in the grand finals.

In August 2023, the Minnesota RØKKR officially parted ways with Price, making him an unrestricted free agent.

After leaving Minnesota, Price would spend the next two seasons on the Vegas Legion and Cloud9 New York, before announcing his retirement from professional Call of Duty on May 26, 2025.

== Tournament results ==
=== Denial eSports ===
- 5-6th — MLG Columbus Open 2014
- 3rd — UMG Orlando 2015
- 2nd — MLG Pro League Season 1 Playoffs
- 2nd — Call of Duty Championship 2015: NA Regional Finals
- 1st — Call of Duty Championship 2015
- 2nd — EWSC Zénith 2015
- 5-8th — Gfinity Spring Masters 1
- 5-6th — X Games Austin 2015

=== FaZe Clan ===
- 1st — UMG Dallas 2015
- 1st — Gfinity Summer Championship
- 7-8th — UMG Washington D.C. 2015
- 1st — MLG Pro League Season 3 Playoffs
- 5-6th — MLG World Finals 2015
- 5-8th — Totino's Invitational 2015
- 5-8th — UMG South Carolina 2016
- 1st — CWL Global Pro League Season 1 Playoffs
- 5-6th — MLG Anaheim 2018
- 5-6th — CWL Global Pro League Season 2 Playoffs
- 3rd — Call of Duty Championship 2018

=== New York Subliners ===
- 1st — New York Home Series Event

=== Minnesota ROKKR ===
- 9-10th — CDL Stage 1 Major 2021
- 4th — CDL Stage 2 Major 2021
- 9-10th — CDL Stage 3 Major 2021
- 5-6th — CDL Stage 4 Major Arlington 2021
- 1st — CDL Stage 5 Major Arlington 2021
- 4th — CDL Champs Los Angeles 2021
- 7-8th — CDL Stage 1 OpTic Texas Major 2022
- 9-12th — CDL Stage 2 Minnesota ROKKR Major 2022
- 7-8th — CDL Stage 3 Toronto Ultra Major 2022
- 9-12th - CDL Stage 4 New York Subliners Major 2022

Preceded by compLexity Gaming	Call of Duty Championship winner 2015; With: Denial eSports: Chris "Replays" Crowder; James "Clayster" Eubanks; Jordan "JKap" Kaplan	Succeeded by Team EnVyUs
