= Call of Duty Championship 2019 =

Esport competition

Call of Duty World League Championship 2019
- 2019

Tournament information
- Sport: Call of Duty: Black Ops 4
- Location: Los Angeles, United States
- Dates: August 14, 2019–August 18, 2019
- Administrator: Activision
- Tournament format: Pool Play to seed brackets then Double-Elimination.
- Venue: Pauley Pavilion
- Teams: 32
- Purse: $2,000,000

Final positions
- Champions: eUnited
- Runner-up: 100 Thieves
- MVP: Chris "Simp" Lehr

The Call of Duty World League Championship 2019 was a Call of Duty: Black Ops 4 tournament on PlayStation 4 which took place from August 14–18, 2019. The tournament was won by the eUnited team consisting of Alec "Arcitys" Sanderson, Preston "Prestinni" Sanderson, James "Clayster" Eubanks, Tyler "aBeZy" Pharris and Chris "Simp" Lehr, with Chris Lehr being chosen as the tournament's MVP.

== Overview ==
The Call of Duty World Championship is a yearly tournament containing all of the best pro and top amateur teams in the world. The 2019 World Championship had a 2 million dollar prize pool with $800,000 awarded to the winning team. The event took place in Pauley Pavilion in Los Angeles, California.

== Rules ==
Each team of the 32 teams that qualified would first be sorted into groups of 4 and would play all 3 other teams in the group. Once finished, the top 2 teams would advance to the winners bracket, the 3rd place team advance to the losers bracket, and the last place team would be eliminated. Teams would then compete in double elimination style bracket until there was crowned a winner. The series were best of 5, with the 3 modes being played. Map 1 and 4 would be Hardpoint (a race to 250 points), map 2 and 5 would be Search and Destroy (a race to 6 round victories), and map 3 would be Control (a race to 3 round victories).

== Qualified Teams ==
The 16 teams which qualified for 2019 CWL Pro League were the first teams to qualify for the 2018 Call of Duty Championship. They were joined by the top 16 amateur teams from the CWL Finals Open Bracket.

Division A	Division B	Open Bracket Finals	
OpTic Gaming	eUnited	TrainHard Esport	Team WaR
Gen.G esports	100 Thieves	Celtic FC Esports (Note: Qualified under The Bhoys.)	FURY Gaming
FaZe Clan	Splyce	Team Vanity (Note: Qualified under exCalibur.)	Sicario Gaming
Team Reciprocity	Team Heretics	Aspire eSports	Mazer Gaming
Midnight Esports	Team Envy	RBL Esports (Note: Qualified under Fire Sticks Gaming Team.)	Team Singularity
Evil Geniuses	UNITS	Carnage Gaming	Animosity eSports (Note: Qualified under Team Divinely.)
Luminosity Gaming	Enigma6	Fuego Gaming	Hybrid Gaming
UYU	Elevate	LGND	Sage eSports

== Groups ==
The draw for the groups took place on 31 July 2019.

Group A
Pos	Team	Series		Games		Qualification
1	eUnited	3–0	100%	9–2	82%	Bracket Play
2	Elevate	1–2	33%	5–7	42%	Bracket Play
3	RBL Esports	1–2	33%	5–7	42%	Eliminated
4	Celtic FC Esports	1–2	33%	4–7	36%	Eliminated

Group B
Pos	Team	Series		Games		Qualification
1	Enigma6	3–0	100%	9–1	90%	Bracket Play
2	Team WaR	2–1	67%	6–3	67%	Bracket Play
3	Fuego Gaming	1–2	33%	4–8	33%	Eliminated
4	Gen.G esports	0–3	0%	2–9	18%	Eliminated

Group C
Pos	Team	Series		Games		Qualification
1	FaZe Clan	3–0	100%	9–2	82%	Bracket Play
2	UNITS	2–1	67%	6–5	55%	Bracket Play
3	Mazer Gaming	1–2	33%	6–7	46%	Eliminated
4	Animosity eSports	0–3	0%	2–9	18%	Eliminated

Group D
Pos	Team	Series		Games		Qualification
1	Team Envy	3–0	100%	9–6	60%	Bracket Play
2	Team Reciprocity	2–1	67%	8–3	73%	Bracket Play
3	Sage eSports	1–2	33%	5–6	45%	Eliminated
4	LGND	0–3	33%	2–9	18%	Eliminated

Group E
Pos	Team	Series		Games		Qualification
1	Team Singularity	3–0	100%	9–2	82%	Bracket Play
2	Luminosity Gaming	2–1	67%	6-5	55%	Bracket Play
3	UYU	1–2	33%	7–6	54%	Eliminated
4	Team Vanity	0–3	0%	0–9	0%	Eliminated

Group F
Pos	Team	Series		Games		Qualification
1	100 Thieves	3–0	100%	9–2	82%	Bracket Play
2	Sicario Gaming	2–1	67%	6–5	55%	Bracket Play
3	Midnight Esports	1–2	33%	6–7	46%	Eliminated
4	FURY Gaming	0–3	0%	2–9	18%	Eliminated

Group G
Pos	Team	Series		Games		Qualification
1	OpTic Gaming	3–0	100%	9–3	75%	Bracket Play
2	Evil Geniuses	2–1	67%	7–4	64%	Bracket Play
3	TrainHard Esport	1–2	33%	5–6	45%	Eliminated
4	Carnage Gaming	0–3	0%	1–9	10%	Eliminated

Group H
Pos	Team	Series		Games		Qualification
1	Splyce	3–0	100%	9–1	90%	Bracket Play
2	Team Heretics	2–1	67%	6–3	67%	Bracket Play
3	Aspire eSports	1–2	33%	3–7	30%	Eliminated
4	Hybrid Gaming	0–3	0%	2–9	18%	Eliminated

== Final standings ==
Place	Team	Prize money
1st	eUnited	$800,000
2nd	100 Thieves	$260,000
3rd	OpTic Gaming	$140,000
4th	Enigma6	$110,000
5th/6th	UNITS	$75,000
5th/6th	Team Reciprocity	$75,000
7th/8th	Luminosity Gaming	$50,000
7th/8th	Evil Geniuses	$50,000
9th-12th	Team WaR	$35,000
9th-12th	Team Singularity	$35,000
9th-12th	Sicario Gaming	$35,000
9th-12th	Elevate	$35,000
13th-16th	Team Heretics	$25,000
13th-16th	FaZe Clan	$25,000
13th-16th	Team Envy	$25,000
13th-16th	Splyce	$25,000
17th-24th	RBL Esports	$15,000
17th-24th	Fuego Gaming	$15,000
17th-24th	Mazer Gaming	$15,000
17th-24th	Sage eSports	$15,000
17th-24th	UYU	$15,000
17th-24th	Midnight Esports	$15,000
17th-24th	TrainHard Esport	$15,000
17th-24th	Aspire eSports	$15,000
25th-32nd	Celtic FC Esports	$10,000
25th-32nd	Gen.G esports	$10,000
25th-32nd	Animosity eSports	$10,000
25th-32nd	LGND	$10,000
25th-32nd	Team Vanity	$10,000
25th-32nd	FURY Gaming	$10,000
25th-32nd	Carnage Gaming	$10,000
25th-32nd	Hybrid Gaming	$10,000

Preceded by Call of Duty Championship 2018	Call of Duty Championship	Succeeded by Competition ceased
