= 2017 CWL Global Pro League =

- 2017

Tournament information
- Sport: Call of Duty: Infinite Warfare
- Location: Columbus, Ohio, United States
- Dates: April 21, 2017–July 30, 2017
- Administrator: Activision
- Purse: $1,400,000

The 2017 CWL Global Pro League was a Call of Duty: Infinite Warfare tournament on PlayStation 4 that occurred on April 21-July 30, 2017.

== Format ==
The 2017 CWL Global Pro League consisted of 2 Stages, with 16 teams from North America, Europe and the APAC region participating. The 16 teams were split into 4 different pools with the top 2 teams from each pool advancing to playoffs. The top 3 teams from each pool advanced to Stage 2, while the fourth place team had to go to the relegation playoffs.

== Stage 1 ==
A total of $700,000 prize money was given out during Stage 1. All 16 teams received $12,500 for participating while the 8 teams which qualified for playoffs played for another $500,000.

Group Red

Pos	Team	Series	Games	Qualification
1	Team EnVyUs	5–1	16–7	Playoffs and Stage 2
2	Splyce	5–1	15–7	Playoffs and Stage 2
3	Mindfreak	1–5	10–15	Stage 2
4	Cloud9	1–5	5–17	Relegation playoffs

Group Blue

Pos	Team	Series	Games	Qualification
1	Evil Geniuses	4–2	12–9	Playoffs and Stage 2
2	FaZe Clan	3–3	12–13	Playoffs and Stage 2
3	Rise Nation	1–5	10–15	Stage 2
4	Fnatic	2–4	9–14	Relegation playoffs

Group Yellow

Pos	Team	Series	Games	Qualification
1	eUnited	5–1	17–10	Playoffs and Stage 2
2	Luminosity Gaming	4–2	15–10	Playoffs and Stage 2
3	Epsilon eSports	3–3	13–11	Stage 2
4	Millenium	0–6	4–18	Relegation playoffs

Group Green

Pos	Team	Series	Games	Qualification
1	OpTic Gaming	6–0	18–5	Playoffs and Stage 2
2	Enigma6 Group	4–2	13–9	Playoffs and Stage 2
3	Elevate	1–5	9–17	Stage 2
4	Red Reserve	1–5	8–17	Relegation playoffs

=== Stage 1 Playoffs final standings ===
Place	Team	Prize money
1st	Splyce	$212,500
2nd	Luminosity Gaming	$132,500
3rd	FaZe Clan	$92,500
4th	OpTic Gaming	$52,500
5th-6th	eUnited	$32,500
5th-6th	Enigma6 Group	$32,500
7th-8th	Team EnVyUs	$22,500
7th-8th	Evil Geniuses	$22,500

== Relegation ==
The 4 bottom teams from Stage 1 participated in the relegation tournament against 4 other teams in a double-elimination bracket for the final 4 spots in Stage 2.

Place	Team
Qualified	Cloud9
Qualified	Red Reserve
Qualified	Supreme Team
Qualified	Fnatic
5th-6th	Tainted Minds
5th-6th	Supremacy
7th-8th	Millenium
7th-8th	eRa Eternity

== Stage 2 ==
A total of $700,000 prize money was given out during Stage 2. All 16 teams received $12,500 for participating while the 8 teams which qualified for playoffs played for another $500,000. The top 3 teams from all Stage 1 groups and the 4 teams which qualified via the relegation tournament participated in Stage 2. All 16 teams also qualified for the 2017 Call of Duty Championship.

Group Red

Pos	Team	Series	Games	Qualification
1	Luminosity Gaming	5–1	17–7	Playoffs
2	Fnatic	4–2	13–9	Playoffs
3	Evil Geniuses	1–5	10–15	
4	Mindfreak	1–5	4–15	

Group Red

Pos	Team	Series	Games	Qualification
1	FaZe Clan	4–2	15–7	Playoffs
2	Enigma6 Group	4–2	13–8	Playoffs
3	Ghost Gaming	4–2	13–8	
4	Elevate	0–6	0–18	

Group Yellow

Pos	Team	Series	Games	Qualification
1	eUnited	5–1	17–5	Playoffs
2	Splyce	3–3	13–10	Playoffs
3	Red Reserve	3–3	12–14	
4	Rise Nation	1–5	8–15	

Group Green

Pos	Team	Series	Games	Qualification
1	OpTic Gaming	6–0	18–3	Playoffs
2	Team EnVyUs	4–2	14–8	Playoffs
3	Cloud9	2–4	8–15	
4	Epsilon eSports	0–6	4–18	

=== Stage 2 Playoffs final standings ===
Place	Team	Prize money
1st	OpTic Gaming	$212,500
2nd	Team EnVyUs	$132,500
3rd	eUnited	$92,500
4th	Luminosity Gaming	$52,500
5th-6th	FaZe Clan	$32,500
5th-6th	Fnatic	$32,500
7th-8th	Splyce	$22,500
7th-8th	Enigma6 Group	$22,500
