= Odallus: The Dark Call =

2015 video game

- Developer(s): Joymasher
- Publisher(s): Joymasher (Note: Nintendo Switch, PlayStation 4, and Xbox One versions published by Digerati.)
- Platform(s): Microsoft Windows; Nintendo Switch; Xbox One; PlayStation 4
- Release: Microsoft Windows: WW: July 15, 2015; Nintendo Switch: WW: February 8, 2019; Xbox One: WW: December 23, 2019; PlayStation 4: NA: March 24, 2020; EU: March 25, 2020
- Genre(s): Platform-adventure, Metroidvania
- Mode(s): Single-player

Odallus: The Dark Call is a 2015 action-adventure platform game in the vein of Castlevania III: Dracula's Curse, developed by Brazilian indie studio Joymasher. The game was originally released for Microsoft Windows, and was later released for Nintendo Switch, Xbox One, and PlayStation 4.

== Plot ==
An army of demons burn Haggis's village and take his son; Haggis goes into action to defeat them. It appears that a mysterious cult has kidnapped his son for plans of a dark sacrifice. Haggis battles his way from the village to a castle on top of a nearby mountain; twice battling two demonic generals on the way, killing one and forcing the other - a woman - to retreat. Along the way he collects mysterious shards that ultimately form the Odallus orb. At the castle's throne room, their leader reveals himself to be Haggis' son, somehow aged to adulthood and claiming to have lived a thousand years. He offers to share the power of the Odallus with his father and rule jointly as the new gods of the world, but Haggis refuses and slays his son. Immediately regretful, he is soon filled with the power of the Odallus, and refuses to rule the world; deciding, instead, that the world has no more need of gods. He summons a pillar of energy that destroys the castle - and presumably himself - as the female general looks on from the distance.

After the credits, Haggis awakens in a strange land, where an ominous glowing eye forms in the clouds, and a voice encourages him to craft a new world from the darkness inside of him.

== Gameplay ==
Odallus is an action-adventure platform game, which is highly reminiscent of early NES platform games, most notably of the Castlevania franchise and Metroid. The player controls Haggis, who can run, jump, and use his weapon, initially a weak sword. With the game having several role-playing elements, Haggis can upgrade his equipment and abilities by finding items hidden throughout the various levels. He can then revisit previous levels to overcome obstacles and find additional secrets. Each level contains a boss that becomes easier to reach when the player uncovers secret shortcuts. Haggis can also acquire subweapons such as axes, torches, etc., which have a limited number of uses, indicated in the game's HUD.

== Development and release ==
Odallus was developed by JoyMasher, a Brazilian developer who had previously released Oniken. The game was part-funded through an Indiegogo crowdfunding campaign, raising $7,533 towards its development costs in August 2013. The game was initially released on July 15, 2015, for Microsoft Windows and was updated in November 2015 to include a more difficult "Veteran Mode" which included new enemy types. Versions for Nintendo Switch and Xbox One were released on February 8, 2019, and December 23, 2019, respectively. The game was released for PlayStation 4 in North America on March 24, 2020, and in Europe the following day on March 25, 2020.

== Reception ==
Odallus received positive reviews, currently sitting at 80/100 on Metacritic.

Destructoid gave the game 9/10, saying, "Odallus: The Dark Call is a worthy addition to any metroidvania fan's library and is worth the asking price.". USgamer also recommended the game. Worthplaying scored Odallus 9/10 and concluded, "Fans who adore adventure games of [the classic] console era should definitely grab Odallus." The game received an 8/10 from CGMagazine, who called it "frustrating at times, thanks to the level of difficulty", but nevertheless recommended the game. M! Games gave the Nintendo Switch version a score of 74 out of 100, calling it a fine homage to games such as The Legendary Axe and Castlevania. Italian magazine The Games Machine gave it a score of 4/5.
