= Smite World Championship 2016 =

- 2016

Tournament information
- Sport: Smite
- Location: Atlanta, Georgia, US
- Dates: January 7–January 10
- Administrator: Hi-Rez Studios
- Venue(s): Cobb Energy Performing Arts Centre
- Purse: US$1 million

Final positions
- Champion: (PC) Epsilon eSports: Dimi; Adapting; Yammyn; iRaffer; emilitoo; (Xbox) Team EnVyUs: 0mega; Weak3n; Allied; CycloneSpin; KikiSoCheeky
- Runner-up: (PC) Enemy: saltmachine; Adjust; Khaos; PainDeViande; Vetium; (Xbox) COG: soupskitchen; Shing; Freya; PAUL; gustavY

Tournament statistics
- Matches played: cbt

The Smite World Championship 2016 was the second annual world championship for the multiplayer online battle arena video game Smite. It was held from January 7–10, 2016, and featured tournaments for both the PC and Xbox One versions of the game. The event was streamed on Twitch on the Smite Game TV account. The total prize pool for the PC tournament was US$1 million.

The PC tournament was won by the European organization Epsilon Esports, with a roster consisting of Dimi, Adapting, Yammyn, iRaffer and emilitoo.

The Xbox One tournament was won by the American organization Team EnVyUs, with a roster consisting of 0mega, Weak3n, Allied, CycloneSpin and KikiSoCheeky.
