= Smite World Championship =

World championship for the multiplayer online video game Smite

Tournament information
- Sport: Smite
- Location: Atlanta, Georgia, US
- Month played: January
- Established: 2015
- Number of tournaments: 1 annually
- Administrator: Hi-Rez Studios
- Format: Double elimination placement stage + single elimination knockout stage
- Teams: 8

Current champion
- Jade Dragons

The Smite World Championship (SWC) is the annual world championship for the multiplayer online battle arena video game Smite.

== History ==
=== Season 1 (2015) ===
From January 9–11, 2015 Hi-Rez Studios hosted the first Smite World Championship. Teams from North America, South America, Europe and China travelled to Atlanta, Georgia for the tournament. The US$2.6 million prize pool for the tournament was at the time, the third-highest in eSports, behind the third and fourth iterations of Dota 2's The International and just slightly ahead of the League of Legends World Championships. One of the North American teams, COGnitive Prime, took home the first place prize of $1.3 million.

=== Season 2 (2016) ===
The 2016 Smite World Championship was held from January 7–10, 2016, and featured tournaments for both the PC and Xbox One versions of the game. The event was streamed on Twitch on the Smite Game TV account. The total prize pool for the PC tournament was US$1 million. Epsilon eSports (Dimi, Adapting, Yammyn, emilitoo, and iRaffer) defeated the North American team Enemy (saltmachine, Adjust, Khaos, Vetium, PainDeViande) in the finals to win the 2016 event.

=== Season 3 (2017) ===
SWC 2017 was held January 5–8 as part of the Hi-Rez Expo event that also included a Smite console world championship, and the Paladins HRX invitational. It was streamed on the Hireztv twitch account and had a US$1 million prize pool. The 2016 champions Epsilon eSports (Dimi, Adapting, Yammyn, emilitoo, and iRaffer), under the new banner of NRG Esports defeated Obey Alliance (Variety, CaptainTwig, PrettyPriMe, Ataraxia, and Pandalike) to become the first repeat SWC winners.

=== Season 4 (2018) ===
The 2018 Smite World Championship was held from January 3–7, 2018. The total prize pool, $785,000, marked the first time the SWC prize pool dropped below $1 million. The North American team eUnited (Benji, Screammmmm, Venenu, Pandacat, and PolarBearMike) defeated the European Team RivaL (Deathwalker, Iceicebaby, Wlfy, Vote, and KaLaS) in the finals.

=== Season 5 (2019) ===
Unlike previous iterations which were held in January, the 2019 Smite World Championship was held from November 16–18, and in order to end the competitive season, was also held in 2018. The Smite World Championship also saw a move to the Georgia World Congress Center, whereas previous iterations were held in the Cobb Energy Performing Arts Centre. The prize pool was estimated around $785,000. North American Splyce (Divios, Cyno, Moswal, Cyclonespin, and Aror) defeated European Team RivaL (Deathwalker, Iceicebaby, Wlfy, Vote, and KaLaS).

=== Season 6 (2020) ===
The 2020 Smite World Championship was held from November 15–17, 2019. The prize pool was estimated to have had a slight increase at $800,000. As its previous iteration, it was held at the Georgia World Congress Center. The 2019 season marked the end of the respective European and North American pro circuits in favor of a centralized pro league based at Hi-Rez Studios headquarters in Alpharetta, Georgia. SK Gaming (ScaryD, Sam4Soccer2, Paul, Zapman, and Neilmah) defeated a new roster under the banner Team RivaL (fineokay, arkkyl, CaptainTwig, PandaCat, and PolarBearMike).

=== Season 7 (2021) ===
The 2021 Smite World Championship was held online due to the COVID-19 pandemic and resumed being held in January, from January 5-11, 2021. The prize pool also dropped to $600,000. The Pittsburgh Knights (composed of 4 members of 2020's SK Gaming roster) defeated Ghost Gaming (composed of 4 members of 2020's Team Rival roster) in a rematch of the 2020 finals. In doing so, 4 members of the Pittsburgh Knights became the second ever repeat winners of the SWC.

=== Season 8 (2022) ===
The 2022 Smite World Championship was held in-studio but without a live audience due to the COVID-19 pandemic from January 6-9, 2022. The prize pool further dropped to $400,000. The Atlantis Leviathans became the first Latin American winners of the SWC, defeating the Tartarus Titans. Steven 'Zapman' Zapas, carry player for the Atlantis Leviathans, became the first player to win the SWC on three occasions, having previously won in 2021 and 2020 with the Pittsburgh Knights and SK Gaming respectively.

=== Season 9 (2023) ===
The 2023 Smite World Championship was played in front of a live audience for the first time in 2 years from January 14-16, 2023. The SWC was also held outside of Georgia for the first time, at Esports Stadium Arlington in Arlington, Texas. The prize pool slightly increased to $415,000. The Camelot Kings defeated returning finalists Tartarus Titans. Libardo 'Jarcorr' López, ADC for the Kings, became the first player to win the SWC in two different roles, having won the 2022 SWC as the Solo laner for Leviathans.

== Past results ==
Year	Champion	Runner-up	3rd–4th place		Most valuable player
2015	COGnitive Prime	Titan	COGnitive Red (3rd)	SK Gaming (4th)	MLCSt3alth – Mid lane (COGnitive Prime)
2016	Epsilon Esports	Enemy	Cloud9	Paradigm	Yammyn – Mid lane (Epsilon eSports)
2017	NRG Esports	Obey Alliance	Luminosity Gaming	Team Eager	emilitoo – ADC (NRG Esports)
2018	eUnited	Team RivaL	NRG Esports	Obey Alliance	Venenu – Mid lane (eUnited)
2019	Splyce	Team RivaL	Dignitas	Trifecta	Cyno – Jungler (Splyce)
2020	SK Gaming	Team RivaL	Renegades	Dignitas	sam4soccer2 – Jungler (SK Gaming)
2021	Pittsburgh Knights	Ghost Gaming	Renegades	Radiance	NeilMah – Support (Pittsburgh Knights)
2022	Atlantis Leviathans	Tartarus Titans	Camelot Kings	Solar Scarabs	Jarcorrr – Solo lane (Atlantis Leviathans)
2023	Camelot Kings	Tartarus Titans	Jade Dragons	Olympus Bolts	Genetics - Support (Camelot Kings)
2024	Jade Dragons	Oni Warrios	Atlantis Leviathans	Styx Ferryman	Dardez - Mid Lane (Jade Dragons)
