= Call of Duty Championship 2018 =

Esports competition

Call of Duty World League Championship 2018
- 2018

Tournament information
- Sport: Call of Duty: WWII
- Location: Columbus, Ohio, United States
- Dates: August 15, 2018–August 19, 2018
- Administrator: Activision
- Tournament format: Pool Play to seed brackets then Double-Elimination.
- Venue: Nationwide Arena
- Teams: 32
- Purse: $1,500,000

Final positions
- Champions: Evil Geniuses
- MVP: Adam "Assault" Garcia

The Call of Duty World League Championship 2018 was a Call of Duty: WWII tournament on PlayStation 4 that took place on August 15–19, 2018. The tournament was won by Evil Geniuses with a roster consisting of Patrick "ACHES" Price, Bryan "Apathy" Zhelyazkov, Adam "Assault" Garcia and Justin "SiLLY" Fargo-Palmer after beating Team Kaliber in the Grand Finals.

== Last Chance Qualifier ==
On July 24–25, 2018 32 teams will play for a chance to qualify for the Call of Duty Championship 2018 in Columbus, Ohio at the MLG Arena. Ten teams will be invited via the CWL National Circuit: the Stage 2 winners of the Mexico and Brazil pilot regions, and the Stage 4 winners of the National Circuit leagues from the United States of America, United Kingdom, Canada, France, Italy, Germany, Spain and Australia. Another 22 teams, 14 from North America, 7 from Europe and 1 from the APAC region, will also be invited based on cumulative CWL Pro Points earned. The top 16 teams will qualify for the 2018 Call of Duty Championship.

=== Last Chance Qualifier teams ===
North America
Lightning Pandas
InControl Gaming
Ghost Gaming
Enigma6 Group
Morituri eSports
Elevate
Team WaR
ESG eSports
GAS Gaming
in2ition
Gone Gaming
HavoK eSports
Mentality eSports
Vertacon
Lethal Gaming
WrangleR Gaming
Team BlackOut

Europe
Brash eSports
Alle Snakes
iDomina Esports
Team Heretics
Giants Gaming
Les Blues
Supremacy
ZoneGG
The Imperial
Team Sween
Team Vitality
Black Forest Gaming

APAC
TabooESC
Synergy Esports Club

Brazil
Virtue Gaming

== Qualified teams ==
32 teams from the North America, Europe and APAC regions will qualify for the tournament. The 16 teams which qualified for Stage 2 of the 2018 CWL Pro League were the first teams to qualify. Another 16 teams will qualify via the Last Chance Qualifier.

=== Pro League Teams ===
The 16 teams which qualified for Stage 2 of the 2018 CWL Pro League were the first teams to qualify for the 2018 Call of Duty Championship.

North America
Rise Nation
OpTic Gaming
Team Kaliber
Echo Fox
compLexity Gaming (Note: compLexity Gaming acquired the 2 players left on the eRa Eternity roster and their spot in the Stage 2 of the league and thus also the spot in the Championship.)
FaZe Clan
Luminosity Gaming
Team EnVyUs
eUnited
Evil Geniuses

Europe
Red Reserve
UNILAD
Splyce
Epsilon eSports

APAC
Mindfreak
Tainted Minds

=== Last Chance Qualifier teams ===
The top 16 teams from the Last Chance Qualifier will qualify for the 2018 Call of Duty Championship.

Place	Team
Top 8	EZG eSports
Top 8	Team Heretics
Top 8	Team Vitality
Top 8	Elevate
Top 8	Enigma6 Group
Top 8	Ghost Gaming
Top 8	Lethal Gaming
Top 8	Les Blues
9th-16th	Morituri eSports
9th-16th	Team Sween
9th-16th	Lightning Pandas
9th-16th	HavoK eSports
9th-16th	ZoneGG
9th-16th	Mentality eSports
9th-16th	Supremacy
9th-16th	Brash eSports

== Groups ==
The draw for the groups took place on 29 July 2018.

Group A
Pos	Team	Series		Games		Qualification
1	Lightning Pandas	3–0	100%	9–4	69%	Bracket Play
2	Team Kaliber	2–1	67%	8–6	57%	Bracket Play
3	Team Heretics	1–2	33%	7–7	50%	Eliminated
4	Epsilon eSports	0–3	0%	2–9	18%	Eliminated

Group B
Pos	Team	Series		Games		Qualification
1	Rise Nation	3–0	100%	9–3	75%	Bracket Play
2	Lethal Gaming	2–1	67%	8–7	53%	Bracket Play
3	Brash eSports	1–2	33%	5–8	38%	Eliminated
4	Tainted Minds	0–3	0%	5–9	36%	Eliminated

Group C
Pos	Team	Series		Games		Qualification
1	Red Reserve	3–0	100%	9–4	69%	Bracket Play
2	Ghost Gaming	2–1	67%	7–5	58%	Bracket Play
3	Mindfreak	1–2	33%	7–6	54%	Eliminated
4	ZoneGG	0–3	0%	0–9	10%	Eliminated

Group D
Pos	Team	Series		Games		Qualification
1	Team Sween	3–0	100%	9–3	75%	Bracket Play
2	eUnited	2–1	67%	8–4	67%	Bracket Play
3	Splyce	1–2	33%	5–6	46.5%	Eliminated
4	EZG eSports	0–3	0%	0–9	0%	Eliminated

Group E
Pos	Team	Series		Games		Qualification
1	FaZe Clan	3–0	100%	9–3	7%	Bracket Play
2	compLexity Gaming	2–1	67%	7–5	58%	Bracket Play
3	Enigma6 Group	1–2	33%	5–6	46.5%	Eliminated
4	Morituri eSports	0–3	0%	2–9	18%	Eliminated

Group F
Pos	Team	Series		Games		Qualification
1	UNILAD	3–0	100%	9–0	100%	Bracket Play
2	Team EnVyUs	2–1	67%	6–3	67%	Bracket Play
3	Mentality eSports	1–2	33%	3–7	30%	Eliminated
4	Team Prismatic	0–3	0%	1–9	10%	Eliminated

Group G
Pos	Team	Series		Games		Qualification
1	Luminosity Gaming	3–0	100%	9–0	100%	Bracket Play
2	Team Vitality	2–1	67%	6–4	60%	Bracket Play
3	Echo Fox	1–2	33%	4–6	46.5%	Eliminated
4	HavoK eSports	0–3	0%	0–9	0%	Eliminated

Group H
Pos	Team	Series		Games		Qualification
1	Evil Geniuses (Note: Evil Geniuses, Elevate and OpTic Gaming were locked in a three-way tie. Based on head-to-head games record, Evil Geniuses finished 1st in the tiebreaker with a 4-3 map record, Elevate finished 2nd with a 4-4 map record and OpTic Gaming finished 3rd with a 3-4 map record.)	2–1	67%	7–4	64%	Bracket Play
2	Elevate	2–1	67%	7–4	64%	Bracket Play
3	OpTic Gaming	2–1	67%	6–4	60%	Eliminated
4	Supremacy	0–3	0%	1–9	10%	Eliminated

== Final standings ==
Place	Team	Prize money
1st	Evil Geniuses	$600,000
2nd	Team Kaliber	$200,000
3rd	FaZe Clan	$100,000
4th	eUnited	$80,000
5th-6th	Team EnVyUs	$55,000
5th-6th	Luminosity Gaming	$55,000
7th-8th	Elevate	$35,000
7th-8th	Red Reserve	$35,000
9th-12th	Team Vitality	$25,000
9th-12th	UNILAD	$25,000
9th-12th	Ghost Gaming	$25,000
9th-12th	Lightning Pandas	$25,000
13th-16th	Lethal Gaming	$15,000
13th-16th	Team Sween	$15,000
13th-16th	compLexity Gaming	$15,000
13th-16th	Rise Nation	$15,000
17th-24th	Team Heretics	$12,500
17th-24th	Brash eSports	$12,500
17th-24th	Mindfreak	$12,500
17th-24th	Splyce	$12,500
17th-24th	Enigma6 Group	$12,500
17th-24th	Mentality eSports	$12,500
17th-24th	Echo Fox	$12,500
17th-24th	OpTic Gaming	$12,500
25th-32nd	Epsilon eSports	$10,000
25th-32nd	Tainted Minds	$10,000
25th-32nd	ZoneGG	$10,000
25th-32nd	EZG eSports	$10,000
25th-32nd	Morituri eSports	$10,000
25th-32nd	Team Prismatic	$10,000
25th-32nd	HavoK eSports	$10,000
25th-32nd	Supremacy	$10,000

Preceded by Call of Duty Championship 2017	Call of Duty Championship	Succeeded by Call of Duty Championship 2019
