= M80 Boston =

American Professional esports team

- Game: Call of Duty
- Founded: December 15, 2021
- League: Call of Duty League
- Team history: Boston Breach (2022–2026); M80 Boston (2026–present)
- Based in: Boston, Massachusetts, U.S.
- Colors
- Parent group: M80

M80 Boston is an American professional Call of Duty League (CDL) esports team based in Boston, Massachusetts. The team is owned by the esports organization M80. It was founded as the Boston Breach by Kraft Sports Group and Oxygen Esports.

== History ==
In December 2021, Kraft Sports Group and Oxygen Esports announced the establishment of a new Call of Duty League team based in Boston, Massachusetts. The following month the franchise revealed its branding and roster for the 2022 Call of Duty League season. During the season the team finished top 6, 3rd, top 12 and top 8 during the four majors, resulting in a 6th place finish in the overall standings. At the 2022 Call of Duty League Championship the team finished top 8 after a 3–2 loss to the Los Angeles Thieves and a 3–1 loss to the Toronto Ultra. Shortly after, the team announced that it would not be extending the contract of player Thomas "TJHaly" Haly.

On August 26, 2026, it was announced that fellow Boston-based organization M80 had bought the Breach, renaming the team to M80 Boston.

== Current roster ==
M80 Boston roster
Players
Coaches

Handle	Name	Nationality
Estreal	McMillan, Justice	United States
Nastie	Plumridge, Byron	England
Neptune	McCloud, Travis	United States
Nium	Harrison, Jeremiah	United States

Head coach

Sean "Seany" O'Connor

Assistant coach(es)

Mike "Magxck" Libeccio

Legend:
- (I) Inactive
- (S) Suspended
- Substitute
- (injured) Injury / Illness

Latest roster transaction: November 5, 2026.

== Awards and records ==
=== Seasons overview ===
Season	Regular season							Finish	Playoffs	Note
Season	P	MW	ML	MW%	GW	GL	GW%	Finish	Playoffs	Note
2022	32	16	16	.500	63	68	.481	6th	7-8th, Lost in Losers round 1, 1–3 (Ultra)	As Boston Breach
2023	38	18	20	.474	80	75	.516	7th	5-6th, Lost in Losers round 2, 1–3 (FaZe)	As Boston Breach
2024	33	6	27	.182	47	87	.351	12th	Did not qualify	As Boston Breach
2025	35	16	19	.457	66	76	.465	8th	3rd, Lost in Losers Finals, 2–3 (Surge)	As Boston Breach
2026	36	12	24	.333	58	89	.395	10th	Did not qualify	As Boston Breach
