= Vengeful Guardian: Moonrider =

Action platformer video game

- Developer: JoyMasher
- Publisher: The Arcade Crew
- Composer: Dominic Ninmark
- Platforms: Windows; PlayStation 4; Nintendo Switch; PlayStation 5
- Release: January 12, 2023
- Genre: Action-platformer
- Mode: Single-player

Vengeful Guardian: Moonrider is a 2D action-platformer developed by JoyMasher and published by The Arcade Crew. It was released for Windows, Nintendo Switch, PlayStation 4 and PlayStation 5 on January 12, 2023. In the game, players take control of a robotic ninja called Moonrider, who seeks to rebel against its tyrannical creators. As players defeat enemies and bosses across the initial seven selectable levels, they can find hidden modifier chips, which can be used to unlock new powers and abilities for Moonrider. The game received generally favorable reviews on release.

== Gameplay ==
Vengeful Guardian: Moonrider is a 2D action-platformer presented from a side-scrolling perspective. The player takes control of a robotic ninja called Moonrider, who was created as a super soldier by a tyrannical dystopian government. Having rebelled against his purpose, Moonrider seeks to overthrow his creators by joining a resistance movement. Moonrider can jump, slash enemies with his energy sword, and run to unleash a powerful attack that can instantly kill enemies if used at the right moment. As Moonrider defeats enemies and bosses across the game’s initial seven levels (which can be played in any order once the opening stage is finished), he can find hidden items called modifier chips, which can be used to unlock new powers and abilities such as a double jump or enhanced armor. In addition, Moonrider can gain new weapons by defeating bosses, such as a "Dark Portal" which shoots foes with a blast of energy, or a spear used for attacking enemies from the front. Each of these new weapons can be used only a limited amount of times, as they share a collective "energy meter" that gradually decreases as they are used.

== Reception ==
Reception

Aggregate score
Aggregator	Score
Metacritic	(PC) 77/100 (PS5) 76/100 (NS) 78/100

Review scores
Publication	Score
Destructoid	7.5/10
Game Informer	7.75/10
Hardcore Gamer	4/5
Nintendo Life	9/10
Push Square	8/10
Shacknews	8/10
TouchArcade	4/5

According to the review aggregator website Metacritic, Vengeful Guardian: Moonrider received "generally favorable reviews". Many critics compared the game to Mega Man X and the Shinobi series. Shacknews praised the music and graphics, although he noted its short length and many similarities to Mega Man X. Nintendo Life similarly enjoyed the combat, and described the 16-bit visuals as "absolutely stunning", but said that some levels featuring a 3D motorcycle were less appealing than the 2D sections. Push Square liked the variety in how levels were themed and found the difficulty to be well-designed, although the reviewer noted that the game may not interest players who did not like retro games.
