= 2025 Call of Duty League season =

- League: Call of Duty League
- Sport: Call of Duty: Black Ops 6
- Duration: December 6, 2024 – June 29, 2025
- Teams: 12
- Season MVP: Thomas "Scrap" Ernst

Major Champions
- Major 1: Atlanta FaZe
- Major 2: Atlanta FaZe
- Major 3: Los Angeles Thieves
- Major 4: Los Angeles Thieves

Grand Finals
- Champions: OpTic Texas
- Runners-up: Vancouver Surge
- Finals MVP: Mason "Mercules" Ramsey

Seasons
- ← 2024 2026 →

The 2025 Call of Duty League season was the sixth season of the Call of Duty League, an esports league based on the video game franchise Call of Duty.

== Teams ==
Team	Location	Joined	Owner
Atlanta FaZe	(United States) Atlanta, GA	2020	Atlanta Esports Ventures, FaZe Clan
Boston Breach	(United States) Boston, MA	2022	Kraft Sports Group
Carolina Royal Ravens	(United States) Charlotte, NC	2020	ReKTGlobal, Inc.
Cloud9 New York	(United States) New York City, NY	2020	Cloud9
Los Angeles Guerrillas M8	(United States) Los Angeles, CA	2020	Gentle Mates
Los Angeles Thieves	(United States) Los Angeles, CA	2021	100 Thieves
Miami Heretics	(United States) Miami, FL	2020	Misfits Gaming, Team Heretics
Minnesota ROKKR	(United States) Minneapolis-Saint Paul, MN	2020	G2 Esports
OpTic Texas	(United States) Dallas, TX	2020	OpTic Gaming
Toronto Ultra	(Canada) Toronto, ON	2020	OverActive Media
Vancouver Surge	(Canada) Vancouver, BC	2020	Canucks Sports & Entertainment, Enthusiast Gaming
Vegas Falcons	(United States) Las Vegas, NV	2020	Team Falcons

== Regular season ==
The 2025 CDL season began on December 6, 2024. Teams competed in four Majors throughout the season, culminating in the Call of Duty Championship tournament. The four majors were played in Madrid (which was the first tournament not held in North America since the inaugural season of the league), Dallas, Boca Raton and Dallas again. The fourth final major was held during Dreamhack Dallas alongside other tournaments in other Esports titles such as Halo and Counter-Strike 2.

== Standings ==
2025 Call of Duty League standings
#	Team	Pts	EP	MW	ML	M%	GW	GL	G%
1	Los Angeles Thieves	540	4	37	11	.771	131	55	.704
2	Atlanta FaZe	505	4	34	11	.756	119	64	.650
3	Toronto Ultra	370	4	30	16	.652	101	77	.567
4	Vancouver Surge	330	4	25	18	.581	94	84	.528
5	Miami Heretics	295	4	20	20	.500	82	83	.497
6	Carolina Royal Ravens	220	4	20	20	.500	75	78	.490
7	OpTic Texas	220	4	20	21	.488	76	80	.487
8	Boston Breach	200	4	16	19	.457	66	76	.465
9	Minnesota ROKKR	165	4	15	24	.385	72	93	.436
10	Cloud9 New York	125	4	12	24	.333	57	80	.416
11	Los Angeles Guerrillas M8	55	4	6	26	.188	42	82	.339
12	Vegas Falcons	35	4	2	28	.067	26	89	.226

As of 25 May 2025

== Major 1 ==
Major 1 online qualifiers began on December 6, 2024, and ended on January 26, 2025.

=== Online qualifiers ===
Pos	Team	Overall Series	Overall Games	Qualification
1	OpTic Texas	6–1	20-10	Winners Round 1 Seed
2	Toronto Ultra	6–1	19-11	Winners Round 1 Seed
3	Boston Breach	5–2	17-15	Winners Round 1 Seed
4	Carolina Royal Ravens	5–2	18-12	Winners Round 1 Seed
5	Los Angeles Thieves	5–2	19–13	Winners Round 1 Seed
6	Atlanta FaZe	4-3	15–13	Winners Round 1 Seed
7	Vancouver Surge	4-3	17–16	Winners Round 1 Seed
8	Miami Heretics	2–5	16-17	Winners Round 1 Seed
9	Los Angeles Guerrillas M8	2–5	13-15	Losers Round 1 Seed
10	Minnesota Rokkr	2–5	13-19	Losers Round 1 Seed
11	Cloud9 New York	1–6	19-19	Losers Round 1 Seed
12	Vegas Falcons	0–7	4-21	Losers Round 1 Seed

=== Major ===
Major 1 ran from January 30 to February 2, 2025. The Major was hosted by Toronto Ultra in Madrid, Spain. The Major I champions were the Atlanta FaZe, who defeated the Los Angeles Thieves 4-3. The MVP was Chris Lehr aka "Simp".

Upper round 1	Upper round 2	Upper final	Final
1	OpTic Texas	2
8	Miami Heretics	3
8	Miami Heretics	0
5	Los Angeles Thieves	3
4	Carolina Royal Ravens	1
5	Los Angeles Thieves	3
5	Los Angeles Thieves	2
6	Atlanta FaZe	3
2	Toronto Ultra	3
7	Vancouver Surge	0
2	Toronto Ultra	0
6	Atlanta FaZe	3
3	Boston Breach	0
6	Atlanta FaZe	3
6	Atlanta FaZe	4
5	Los Angeles Thieves	3
Lower round 1	Lower round 2	Lower round 3	Lower round 4	Lower final
1	OpTic Texas	3
2	Toronto Ultra	2
9	Los Angeles Guerrillas M8	2
1	OpTic Texas	1	3	Carolina Royal Ravens	3
3	Carolina Royal Ravens	3	5	Los Angeles Thieves	3
3	Carolina Royal Ravens	3
3	Carolina Royal Ravens	1	8	Miami Heretics	0
12	Vegas Falcons	0
8	Miami Heretics	3
7	Vancouver Surge	1
8	Miami Heretics	3
10	Minnesota ROKKR	3
10	Minnesota ROKKR	3	10	Minnesota ROKKR	2
11	Cloud9 New York	1
3	Boston Breach	2
11	Cloud9 New York	3

== Major 2 ==
Major 2 online qualifiers began on February 2, 2025, and ended on March 16, 2025.

=== Online qualifiers ===
Pos	Team	Overall Series	Overall Games	Qualification
1	Los Angeles Thieves	7–0	21–2	Winners Round 1 Seed
2	Atlanta FaZe	6–1	19–8	Winners Round 1 Seed
3	Toronto Ultra	5–2	15–12	Winners Round 1 Seed
4	Carolina Royal Ravens	5–2	16–8	Winners Round 1 Seed
5	Vancouver Surge	5–2	17–12	Winners Round 1 Seed
6	Cloud9 New York	4-3	16–9	Winners Round 1 Seed
7	Minnesota Rokkr	3-4	11–13	Winners Round 1 Seed
8	Boston Breach	3-4	13–16	Winners Round 1 Seed
9	Miami Heretics	2–5	10–15	Losers Round 1 Seed
10	OpTic Texas	1–6	3–19	Losers Round 1 Seed
11	Los Angeles Guerrillas M8	1–6	8–18	Losers Round 1 Seed
12	Vegas Falcons	0–7	4–21	Losers Round 1 Seed

=== Major ===
Major 2 ran from March 20 to 23, 2025. The Major was hosted by OpTic Texas in Allen, Texas. The Major 2 champions were the Atlanta FaZe, who defeated the Vancouver Surge 4-0. The MVP was McArthur Jovel aka "Cellium".

Upper round 1	Upper round 2	Upper final	Final
1	Los Angeles Thieves	1
8	Boston Breach	3
8	Boston Breach	1
5	Vancouver Surge	3
4	Carolina Royal Ravens	0
5	Vancouver Surge	3
5	Vancouver Surge	2
2	Atlanta FaZe	3
2	Atlanta FaZe	3
7	Minnesota Rokkr	0
2	Atlanta FaZe	3
6	Cloud9 New York	1
3	Toronto Ultra	0
6	Cloud9 New York	3
2	Atlanta FaZe	4
5	Vancouver Surge	0
Lower round 1	Lower round 2	Lower round 3	Lower round 4	Lower final
1	Los Angeles Thieves	3
6	Cloud9 New York	0
9	Miami Heretics	1
1	Los Angeles Thieves	3	1	Los Angeles Thieves	3
4	Carolina Royal Ravens	0	5	Vancouver Surge	3
4	Carolina Royal Ravens	3
1	Los Angeles Thieves	0	3	Toronto Ultra	1
12	Vegas Falcons	0
3	Toronto Ultra	3
7	Minnesota Rokkr	0
8	Boston Breach	0
10	OpTic Texas	3
10	OpTic Texas	0	3	Toronto Ultra	3
3	Toronto Ultra	3
3	Toronto Ultra	3
11	Los Angeles Guerrillas M8	0

== Major 3 ==
Major 3 online qualifiers began on April 4, 2025, and ended on April 20, 2025.

=== Online qualifiers ===
Pos	Team	Overall Series	Overall Games	Qualification
1	Los Angeles Thieves	4–1	14–3	Winners Round 1 Seed
2	Boston Breach	4–1	14–6	Winners Round 1 Seed
3	Vancouver Surge	4–1	12–7	Winners Round 1 Seed
4	Miami Heretics	4–1	13–8	Winners Round 1 Seed
5	Toronto Ultra	4–1	12–9	Winners Round 1 Seed
6	Atlanta FaZe	3–2	12–9	Winners Round 1 Seed
7	OpTic Texas	2–3	9–11	Winners Round 1 Seed
8	Carolina Royal Ravens	2–3	9–12	Winners Round 1 Seed
9	Minnesota Rokkr	1-4	10–14	Losers Round 1 Seed
10	Vegas Falcons	1-4	8–13	Losers Round 1 Seed
11	Los Angeles Guerrillas M8	1-4	5–14	Losers Round 1 Seed
12	Cloud9 New York	0-5	3–15	Losers Round 1 Seed

=== Major ===
Major 3 ran from April 24 to 27, 2025. The Major was hosted by Miami Heretics in Boca Raton, Florida. The Major 3 champions were the Los Angeles Thieves, who defeated the Vancouver Surge 4-0. The MVP was Thomas Ernst aka "Scrap".

Upper round 1	Upper round 2	Upper final	Final
1	Los Angeles Thieves	3
8	Carolina Royal Ravens	0
1	Los Angeles Thieves	3
4	Miami Heretics	0
4	Miami Heretics	3
5	Toronto Ultra	1
1	Los Angeles Thieves	3
3	Vancouver Surge	2
2	Boston Breach	3
7	OpTic Texas	0
2	Boston Breach	1
3	Vancouver Surge	3
3	Vancouver Surge	3
6	Atlanta FaZe	1
1	Los Angeles Thieves	4
3	Vancouver Surge	0
Lower round 1	Lower round 2	Lower round 3	Lower round 4	Lower final
8	Carolina Royal Ravens	1
2	Boston Breach	1
9	Minnesota Rokkr	3
9	Minnesota Rokkr	1	5	Toronto Ultra	3
5	Toronto Ultra	3	3	Vancouver Surge	3
5	Toronto Ultra	3
5	Toronto Ultra	3	5	Toronto Ultra	1
12	Los Angeles Guerrillas M8	0
4	Miami Heretics	2
7	OpTic Texas	3
4	Miami Heretics	3
10	Vegas Falcons	0
7	OpTic Texas	0	6	Atlanta FaZe	2
6	Atlanta FaZe	3
6	Atlanta FaZe	3
11	Cloud9 New York	0

== Major 4 ==
Major 4 online qualifiers began on May 2, 2025, and ended on May 18, 2025.

=== Online qualifiers ===
Pos	Team	Overall Series	Overall Games	Qualification
1	Miami Heretics	5–0	15–6	Winners Round 1 Seed
2	Atlanta FaZe	4–1	13–5	Winners Round 1 Seed
3	OpTic Texas	3–2	13–6	Winners Round 1 Seed
4	Los Angeles Thieves	3–2	11–6	Winners Round 1 Seed
5	Vancouver Surge	3–2	11–8	Winners Round 1 Seed
6	Toronto Ultra	3–2	10–8	Winners Round 1 Seed
7	Cloud9 New York	2–3	8–10	Winners Round 1 Seed
8	Minnesota Rokkr	2–3	9–12	Winners Round 1 Seed
9	Boston Breach	2–3	6–11	Losers Round 1 Seed
10	Los Angeles Guerrillas M8	1–4	7–14	Losers Round 1 Seed
11	Carolina Royal Ravens	1–4	5–12	Losers Round 1 Seed
12	Vegas Falcons	1–4	4–14	Losers Round 1 Seed

=== Major ===
Major 4 ran from May 23 to 25, 2025. The Major 4 champions were the Los Angeles Thieves, who defeated the Atlanta FaZe 4-2. The MVP was Thomas Ernst aka "Scrap".

Upper round 1	Upper round 2	Upper final	Final
1	Miami Heretics	3
8	Minnesota Rokkr	0
1	Miami Heretics	3
4	Los Angeles Thieves	2
4	Los Angeles Thieves	3
5	Vancouver Surge	0
1	Miami Heretics	1
2	Atlanta FaZe	3
2	Atlanta FaZe	3
7	Cloud9 New York	1
2	Atlanta FaZe	3
3	OpTic Texas	1
3	OpTic Texas	3
6	Toronto Ultra	1
2	Atlanta FaZe	2
4	Los Angeles Thieves	4
Lower round 1	Lower round 2	Lower round 3	Lower round 4	Lower final
8	Minnesota Rokkr	3
3	OpTic Texas	3
9	Boston Breach	2
8	Minnesota Rokkr	3	8	Minnesota Rokkr	1
12	Vegas Falcons	2	1	Miami Heretics	0
5	Vancouver Surge	2
3	OpTic Texas	1	4	Los Angeles Thieves	3
12	Vegas Falcons	3
4	Los Angeles Thieves	3
7	Cloud9 New York	0
4	Los Angeles Thieves	3
10	Los Angeles Guerrillas M8	3
10	Los Angeles Guerrillas M8	1	6	Toronto Ultra	1
6	Toronto Ultra	3
6	Toronto Ultra	3
11	Carolina Royal Ravens	2

== Championship ==
The 2025 Call of Duty League Championship took place at the Kitchener Memorial Auditorium in Kitchener, Ontario, Canada from 26 to 29 June.

=== Bracket ===
Winners Round 1	Winners Round 2	Winners Final	Final
1	Los Angeles Thieves	2
8	Boston Breach	3
8	Boston Breach	3
5	Miami Heretics	2
4	Vancouver Surge	1
5	Miami Heretics	3
8	Boston Breach	0
7	OpTic Texas	3
2	Atlanta FaZe	0
7	OpTic Texas	3
7	OpTic Texas	3
3	Toronto Ultra	0
3	Toronto Ultra	3
6	Carolina Royal Ravens	1	7	OpTic Texas	5
4	Vancouver Surge	3
Elimination Round 1	Elimination Round 2	Elimination Round 3	Elimination Final
3	Toronto Ultra	0
1	Los Angeles Thieves	0	4	Vancouver Surge	3	8	Boston Breach	2
4	Vancouver Surge	3	4	Vancouver Surge	3	4	Vancouver Surge	3
5	Miami Heretics	2
5	Miami Heretics	3
2	Atlanta FaZe	3	2	Atlanta FaZe	0
6	Carolina Royal Ravens	0

=== Grand finals ===
The 2025 Call of Duty League season Grand finals was held on June 29, 2025. It was a best of 9 (first to 5).

Grand Finals	June 29	OpTic Texas	5	–	3	Vancouver Surge
	12:00 PDT/15:00 EDT (19:00 UTC)					
		250	Hacienda - Hardpoint			151
		0	Dealership - Search & Destroy			6
		3	Protocol - Control			2
		250	Vault - Hardpoint			230
		5	Protocol - Search & Destroy			6
		2	Hacienda - Control			3
		6	Hacienda - Search & Destroy			2
		250	Rewind - Hardpoint			215
