= Electronic Game Show =

Video game convention held in Mexico

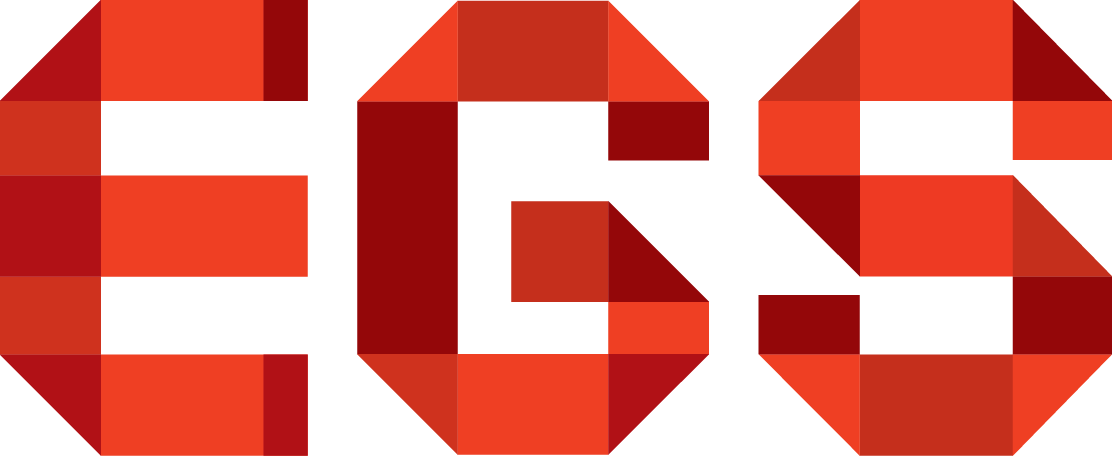
- Status: Active
- Genre: Video games
- Venue: World Trade Center Mexico City, Expo Bancomer, Centro Banamex, Expo Guadalajara
- Locations: Mexico City, Guadalajara
- Country: Mexico
- Inaugurated: 2002
- Attendance: 40,000 (2014)
- Organizer: Alazraki Gaming
- Website: electronicgameshow.com

Electronic Game Show, known also as EGS, is the largest video game convention that takes place in Mexico. It is held each year in Mexico City, since 2002, usually during early October. The first edition took place during May at World Trade Center Mexico City. The 2015 edition of EGS will take place in October 2, 3 and 4 at Centro Banamex.

== History ==
EGS was created by Jorge Alor, Oscar Noriega, Jorge Lizárraga and Mario Valle to increase the potential of the Mexican gaming industry, which back in 2002 was almost non-existent. Back then, none of the biggest gaming publishers and brands had direct representation in Mexico and were merely distributors.

The first EGS was conceived by Oelli (a Mexican entertainment company), which was brought together to piece the first Electronic Game Show. This event took place during the month of May and it included presentations by several gaming and non-gaming brands.

=== EGS 2002 ===
The first EGS was attended by over 30,000 people, and 38 different exhibitors were a part of it. It was held in World Trade Center, in Mexico City.

Xbox México was the most important gaming brand that participated in this first edition.

Other participating brands were: Kellogg's, Bubbaloo, Banco Bital, Bimbo, Atomix, and Gameplanet; among others.
