= 2019 CWL Pro League =

- 2019

Tournament information
- Sport: Call of Duty: Black Ops 4
- Location: Columbus, Ohio, United States; Miami, Florida, United States
- Dates: 4 February 2019–July 2019
- Administrator: Activision
- Host(s): Major League Gaming
- Venue(s): MLG Arena in Columbus, Ohio; Miami Beach Convention Center
- Teams: 16
- Purse: $2,400,000

Final positions
- Champions: eUnited
- Runner-up: Gen.G esports
- MVP: Chris "Simp" Lehr

The 2019 CWL Pro League was the Call of Duty: Black Ops 4 league on PlayStation 4 which took place from February through July, 2019.

== Format ==
The 2019 CWL Global Pro League will consist of a single stage, with 16 teams from North America, Europe and the APAC region participating. The 16 teams will be split into 2 different divisions. Unlike previous years, teams will also play against teams from the other division. Teams will be able to make changes to their roster throughout the season, with matches being broadcast on Monday through Thursday. The top teams will qualify for the CWL Finals.

=== Tiebreakers ===
In the event of two or more teams having the same win–loss record at the conclusion of the Regular Season, final placing will be determined via tiebreaker rules. Tiebreaker rules in order:

1. Head to head match win percentage (Matches won vs tied teams / matches played vs. tied teams)
2. Head to head game win percentage (Games won vs tied teams / games played vs. tied teams)
3. Divisional match win percentage (Matches won vs same division teams / matches played vs same division teams)
4. Divisional game win percentage (Games won vs same division teams / games played vs same division teams)
5. Overall game win percentage (overall games won / overall games played)

If these tiebreakers cannot break a tie, the tied teams will be scheduled to play a best-of-five round-robin tiebreaker. A coin-flip will determine which team will act as home and away for pick ban process. After each team has played all other tied Teams in the tiebreaker, their records of games won and games lost will be used to break the tie.

If there is a tie involving more than two teams and a tiebreaker resolved the tie for a team(s), but leaves at least two teams tied, the tie(s) that remains will be broken by starting over with the Head to Head Match winning percentage tiebreaker.

== Pro League ==
16 teams from around the world will participate in the CWL Pro League. The top four teams from CWL Las Vegas will automatically qualify for the CWL Pro League while teams placing 5th - 32nd will fight for the remaining 12 CWL Pro League spots, at a qualification event that will take place in January at the MLG Arena in Columbus, Ohio.

=== Qualified teams ===
CWL Las Vegas
OpTic Gaming (1st)
eUnited (2nd)
Splyce (3rd)
Luminosity Gaming (4th)

Qualifiers Pool Winners
Enigma6 (Pool A)
Team Envy (Pool B)
Midnight Esports (Pool C)
Evil Geniuses (Pool D)

Qualifiers Pool Runners-Up
Team Reciprocity (Pool A)
Team Heretics (Pool B)
100 Thieves (Pool C)
UYU (Pool D)

Qualifiers Playoff Winners
Excelerate Gaming (WB)
Team Space (WB)
Red Reserve (LB)
Overtime eSport (LB)

== Regular season ==
A total of 16 teams, spread across 2 Divisions, participate during the Regular Season of the Pro League. Each team will play 22 matches: two Best of Five series against the other teams in their Division and one Best of Five series against the eight teams in the other Division. The top 4 teams from each Division will directly qualify for the Playoff Bracket while the bottom 4 teams will have to play in the Play-In Bracket. Matches will be played from February 4 through July 5.

=== Division A ===
Pos	Team	Overall Series	Overall Games	Divisional Series	Divisional Games	Qualification
1	OpTic Gaming	16–6	53–38	11–3	37–19	Playoff Bracket
2	Gen.G esports (Note: Gen.G esports acquired the Team Space roster and the team's spot on 31 January 2019.)	15–7	54–36	8–6	32–27	Playoff Bracket
3	FaZe Clan (Note: FaZe Clan acquired the Red Reserve roster and the team's spot on 20 April 2019.)	13–9	51–36	10–4	36–17	Playoff Bracket
4	Team Reciprocity	12–10	43–48	7–7	27–32	Playoff Bracket
5	Midnight Esports	12–10	43–40	7–7	25–26	Play-In Bracket
6	Evil Geniuses	8–14	40–51	5–9	21–28	Play-In Bracket
7	Luminosity Gaming	8–14	40–51	3–11	19–37	Play-In Bracket
8	UYU	6–16	29–55	5–9	24–34	Play-In Bracket

=== Division B ===
Pos	Team	Overall Series	Overall Games	Divisional Series	Divisional Games	Qualification
1	eUnited	18–4	60–32	12–2	38–21	Playoff Bracket
2	100 Thieves	17–5	57–24	11–3	35–15	Playoff Bracket
3	Splyce	11–11	46–43	7–7	29–27	Playoff Bracket
4	Team Heretics	10–12	41–50	7–7	29–31	Playoff Bracket
5	Team Envy	8–14	41–49	4–10	25–33	Play-In Bracket
6	UNITS (Note: Denial Esports acquired the Overtime eSports roster and the organization's spot on 29 January 2019. On 31 May 2019, Denial Esports closed its doors and the team continued under the UNITS name.)	8–14	39–55	5–9	24–35	Play-In Bracket
7	Enigma6	7–15	39–54	5–9	26–33	Play-In Bracket
8	Elevate (Note: Elevate acquired the Excelerate Gaming roster and the organization's spot on 19 April 2019.)	7–15	40–54	5–9	25–36	Play-In Bracket

== Playoffs ==
The playoffs will take place from July 19–21, 2019 at the Miami Beach Convention Center.

=== Play-in bracket ===
The play-in bracket is a single-elimination bracket consisting of the teams who placed 5th–8th in their division during regular-season play. Once two teams remain in the play-in bracket, those teams will be moved to round one of the playoff bracket.

Semifinals
B5	Team Envy	0
A8	UYU	3
6A	Evil Geniuses	3
7B	Enigma6	0
5A	Midnight Esports	3
8B	Elevate	2
6B	UNITS	1
7A	Luminosity Gaming	3

Finals
UYU	0
Evil Geniuses	3
Midnight Esports	1
Luminosity Gaming	3

Qualified
Evil Geniuses	PI1
Luminosity Gaming	PI2

=== Playoff bracket ===
The playoff bracket is a ten-team double-elimination bracket which consists of the two teams who qualified via the play-in bracket and the top four teams from each division of regular-season play. The 4th-placed team from each division will be placed in the first round of the winners' bracket, facing one of the two teams which qualified via the play-in bracket.

==== Winners' bracket ====
Round 1
B4	Team Heretics	2
PI2	Luminosity Gaming	3
A4	Team Reciprocity	3
PI1	Evil Geniuses	0

Round 2
A1	OpTic Gaming	0
Luminosity Gaming	3
B2	100 Thieves	0
A3	FaZe Clan	3
A2	Gen.G esports	3
B3	Splyce	1
B1	eUnited	3
Team Reciprocity	0

Round 3
Luminosity Gaming	1
FaZe Clan	3
Gen.G esports	1
eUnited	3

Round 4
FaZe Clan	1
eUnited	3

==== Final 3 ====
The Final 3 consists of the Winners Bracket Round 4 winners who enter in the Final, the Winners Bracket Round 4 losers and the winners of the Losers Bracket.

Semifinal		Final
		eUnited	0	3	W
FaZe Clan	0	Gen.G esports	3	0	L
Gen.G esports	3

=== Prize money ===
A total of $2,400,000 prize money for the 2019 CWL Pro League will be distributed as follows:

Place	Team	Prize money	Win bonus (Note: Teams also got a $2,500 bonus for each win during the Regular Season.)	Total prize money
1st	eUnited	$544,375	$45,000	$589,375
2nd	Gen.G esports	$344,375	$37,500	$381,875
3rd	FaZe Clan	$244,375	$32,500	$276,875
4th	Team Reciprocity	$144,375	$30,000	$147,375
5th-6th	100 Thieves	$88,125	$42,500	$130,625
5th-6th	Luminosity Gaming	$88,125	$20,000	$108,125
7th-8th	OpTic Gaming	$63,125	$40,000	$103,125
7th-8th	Splyce	$63,125	$27,500	$90,675
9th-10th	Team Heretics	$56,875	$25,000	$81,875
9th-10th	Evil Geniuses	$56,875	$20,000	$76,875
11th-12th	Midnight Esports	$44,375	$30,000	$74,375
11th-12th	UYU	$44,375	$15,000	$59,375
13th-16th	Team Envy	$44,375	$20,000	$64,375
13th-16th	UNITS	$44,375	$20,000	$64,375
13th-16th	Enigma6	$44,375	$17,500	$61,875
13th-16th	Elevate	$44,375	$17,500	$61,875
