= Oniken =

2012 video game

- Developer: Joymasher
- Publisher: Joymasher
- Designers: Danilo Dias; Pedro Paiva; Thais Weiller
- Programmers: Danilo Dias; Marco Galvão
- Platforms: Windows, OS X, Linux, Switch, Xbox One, PlayStation 4
- Release: Windows: WW: June 21, 2012; OS X/Linux: WW: November 20, 2012; Switch: WW: February 1, 2019; Xbox One: WW: December 23, 2019; PlayStation 4: WW: March 23, 2020
- Genres: Action, platform
- Mode: Single-player

Oniken is a side-scrolling action platform video game developed and published by independent Brazilian studio Joymasher for Microsoft Windows, OS X and Linux. The game was released worldwide for Microsoft Windows on June 21, 2012, on OS X and Linux on November 20, 2012, and on Nintendo Switch on February 1, 2019, as Oniken: Unstoppable Edition. In August 2012, the developers have announced that the game was accepted on Steam Greenlight.

== Gameplay ==
Zaku (left) encountering a boss battle with an Oniken commander (right).

The game has an 8-bit style and follows a classic slasher gameplay formula similar to Strider, Ninja Gaiden and Shatterhand.

The objective in the game is to get to the end of each level and beat the boss for the level. There are six levels in the game and an extra mission with an additional character in Contra gameplay style after you beat the game.

== Plot ==
Taking place in a post-apocalyptic future, human kind has nearly been completely destroyed by global war. Those few humans that have managed to survive are being oppressed by a cybernetic armada known as the Oniken. A small resistance led by General Zhukov attempt to defend against the Oniken but are ultimately overwhelmed by their forces. Zaku (a legendary ninja mercenary, with an unknown past) who is believed to be the only one capable of stopping the Oniken, is approached by Zhukov and asked to join the resistance movement against the robotic forces, to which Zaku obliges.

== Development ==
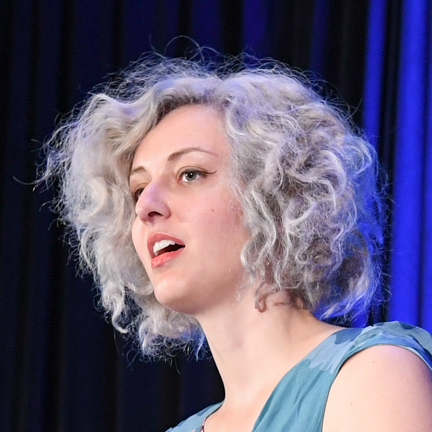
Thais Weiller of JoyMasher presenting at the 2017 Game Developers Conference

Oniken was developed by the duo consisting of friends Danilo Dias (JoyMasher) and Pedro Paiva (then Arcaica, now Menos PlayStation) as a means for them to pay homage to their favorite games from the 8-bit era, such as Ninja Gaiden, Contra, Kabuki Quantum Fighter, Shadow of the Ninja and Vice: Project Doom. Zaku's character design was highly inspired by that of Kenshiro from Fist of the North Star fame.

== Reception ==
Shortly after release, Oniken was included in the July Jubilee bundle, part of the series of bundles on Indie Royale, a Desura indie bundle service. It received a score of 7/10 on Destructoid. Multiplayer.it gave it 8.0/10.
