= Thais Weiller =

Brazilian game designer and producer

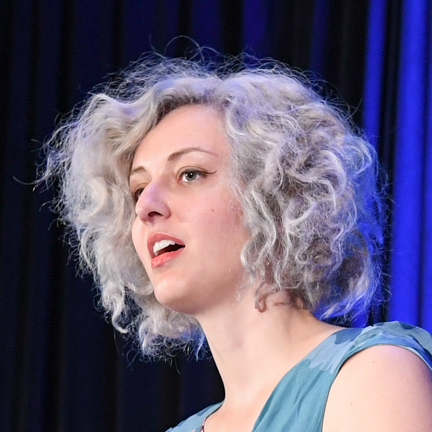
- Thais Weiller in March 2017
- Occupation: Video game designer
- Known for: Co-founder of JoyMasher
- Notable work: Oniken and Odallus

Thais Weiller is a Brazilian game designer and producer. Together with Danilo Dias she co-founded JoyMasher and released Oniken, Odallus, Blazing Chrome and Vengeful Guardian: Moonrider.

== Work ==
She has also created Rainy Day, a game about anxiety and depression: she spoke at Game Developers Conference (GDC) in 2017 about "wondering why no one was making games about the 'crappy moments in life,' like break ups, awful bosses, and experiences with serious health conditions."

Rainy Day was described by one reviewer as "um jogo curtinho sobre ansiedade e depressão que você deveria jogar agora" ("a short game about anxiety and depression which you should play now").

She has also published two books on game design, "Game Start" and "Pense Pequeno", under Creative Commons license share-alike. Both books are in Portuguese and available for free download.

== Education ==
She has an M.Sc. in game design from the University of São Paulo and currently pursuits a PhD in Tampere University.
