= Enemy (esports) =

American esports organization

- Short name: NME
- Divisions: Call of Duty; Gears of War; League of Legends; Smite
- Founded: 2012
- Folded: 2017
- Based in: Corona, California
- Location: United States
- Website: enemy.gg

Enemy or NME was an American esports organization with teams competing in League of Legends, Call of Duty, Smite, and Super Smash Bros. They were originally branded as Enemy eSports. Enemy's League of Legends team competed in the League of Legends Championship Series (LCS), but was relegated to the League of Legends Challenger Series after their first split in the LCS. The organization ended all operations in 2017.

== League of Legends ==
Enemy eSports was founded in 2012 by Dan "Clerkie" Clerke, Robert "Chachi" Stemmler, and James "JR3" Ryan. In May Enemy eSports announced that they had rejected a $1.2 million offer from Martin Shkreli.

=== 2014 season ===
Enemy acquired the roster of Also Known As (AKA) in spring of 2014 to represent them in the NACS. The roster consisted of Potato Zero, Stan007, Jayel, SleepingDAWG, and Papa Chau. Leara (manager) and theangelvigil (analyst) joined as support staff. The team was unable to qualify for the NACS.

=== 2015 Preseason ===
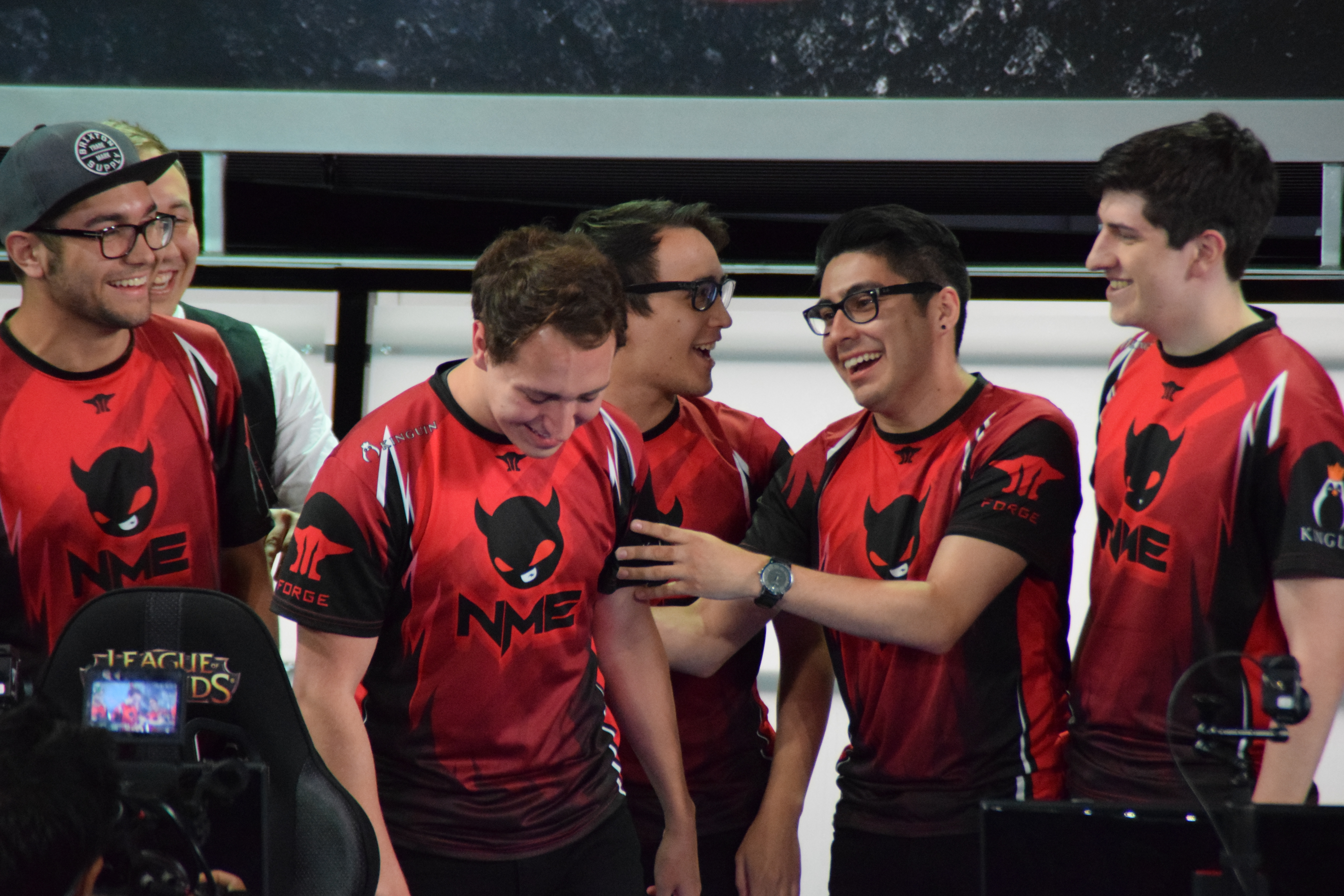
Enemy after a match in 2015

On September 30, Enemy eSports announced their new roster for the Spring Expansion tournament. cackgod, Liquid Inori|Inori, Wolfsclaw, Otter, and Bodydrop competed under the name "The Cackson 5" in the ranked 5s ladder to qualify for the tournament. At the time of the ladder lock, they were ranked second behind Team Coast's team.

Enemy eSports placed second in the 2014 Fall NA Black Monster Cup, beating Boreal eSports and Zenith eSports before falling to Team LoLPro in the finals.

On November 17, after winning their first-round match against Noble Truth in the Expansion Tournament 2–0, Enemy announced a partnership with Azubu. The team then lost 0–2 to Team Fusion in the second round, against MakNooN's Poppy both games.

After elimination from the Expansion Tournament, Enemy eSports underwent roster tryouts. The roster listed for the NACL New Year's Kick-off Tournament included Flaresz, Cackgod, Innox, Otter, and Bodydrop, with LOD and Wolfe as substitutes.

During late December, Enemy management decided on a Challenger Series roster of Flaresz top, Innox mid, Otter and Bodydrop in the bottom lane, and former H2K jungler and European Challenger Series winner Trashy. In early January 2015, the team moved into a gaming house in Corona, California. Due to Bodydrop's flight being delayed, the team needed to use a substitute support player in the ESL Pro Series Season XI, and took an upset loss against Monster Kittens.

=== 2015 season ===
A couple weeks later, Enemy played in the 2015 North American Challenger Series qualifiers as the #1 seed from the Ranked 5's ladder and qualified for the 2015 Challenger Series with 2–0 victories over Arbiters and Darkness.

Enemy finished the Challenger season as the top team with a 9–1 record, dropping only one game to Team Fusion. In the 2015 playoffs, they defeated Final Five and then Team Dragon Knights and successfully qualified for the Summer LCS split. After the team's LCS qualification, CEO Dan "clerkie" Clerke received an offer for $1.2 million from Martin Shkreli; however, he declined it, stating the members of the organization "...believe in this roster. These players have risked so much in the hunt for their dream, we want to take this journey with them." Prior to the start of the summer split, Enemy dropped the "eSports" from their name and rebranded themselves as just "Enemy".

Enemy's summer split performance was rocky, and they didn't finish higher than seventh place a single week after the second. They ended the split in ninth place, one game above Team Dragon Knights, narrowly avoiding autorelegation. However, in the 2016 Spring Promotion tournament, Enemy lost 3–0 to Team Coast and were sent to the 2016 Challenger Series. On August 6, 2015, it was announced that Youngbuck would become the team's new head coach.

== Smite ==
Enemy had a Smite team for Smite Pro League Season 2, but the team members later left when the team was relegated. In August, Enemy acquired the roster of Legion of Carrots and returned to the SPL.

The new NME team, consisting of Benjamin "wigglesdabae" Lyubarskiy, Chris "Tri0" McGee, Declan "Quatr0" McJohnson, Alexander "Khaos" Greenstein, and captain Louis-Phillipe "PainDeViande" Geoffrion, would place 5th in the SPL Fall Split 2015, but would still qualify for LAN under the new Super Regional format, although wigglesdabae left midway through the split, replaced by Jared "Adjust" Deline. They would upset Team SoloMid (3–1) and Team EnVyUs (3–2) to secure second place in the NA Smite Super Regionals 2015, losing to Cloud9 G2A, but qualifying for the SWC.

The same team would go on to upset FNATIC and Paradigm to move onto the finals of the SWC, falling to Epsilon eSports. The team placed 2nd at the 2016 Smite World Championship.

Following their success, Adjust was dropped, and Suharab "Masked" Askarzada replaced him. Only a couple weeks later, Masked, Vetium, and saltmachine (then known as Benj1) would leave Enemy for Denial eSports, and captain PainDeViande brought on three rookies, Maksim "PandaCat" Yanevich (who he had previously played with on Legion of Carrots), Lucas "Varizial" Spracklin, and Travis "Marauder" Navarro, for the SPL Spring Split of Season 3. Defying all odds, the team would go on to upset the entire league, taking first place and qualifying for Dreamhack Masters 2016.

At Dreamhack, they would defeat Kaos Latin Gamers before losing to Soar G2A in the semi-finals.

In the off-season, they would participate in the Epsilon Invitational, drawing with Paradigm in the group stage, before winning a tiebreaker and facing a rematch with Panthera (formerly Epsilon, now NRG). They would take 2 games off of the world champions, but lose in the end. Lucas "Varizial" Spracklin would change his name to "Shatt3red" going into the event.

In the Fall Split of Season 3, PandaCat was forced to go to Ukraine for vacation as a family tradition, so Jonathan "Fearno" King substituted for him in the online events. PandaCat returned to North America in the final week of online events, however, unlike previous splits, Enemy was not a top team, placing seventh of eight in online events. After Enemy disbanded, the team left for CEO Dan "clerkie" Clerke's new organization EUnited.
