= 2024 Call of Duty League season =

- League: Call of Duty League
- Sport: Call of Duty: Modern Warfare III
- Duration: December 8, 2023 – June 21, 2024
- Teams: 12
- Season MVP: Chris "Simp" Lehr

Major Champions
- Major 1: Toronto Ultra
- Major 2: Atlanta FaZe
- Major 3: OpTic Texas
- Major 4: New York Subliners

Grand Finals
- Champions: OpTic Texas
- Runners-up: New York Subliners
- Finals MVP: Anthony "Shotzzy" Cuevas-Castro

Seasons
- ← 2023 2025 →

The 2024 Call of Duty League season was the fifth season of the Call of Duty League, an esports league based on the video game franchise Call of Duty.

== Teams ==
Team	Location	Joined	Owner
Atlanta FaZe	(United States) Atlanta, GA	2020	Atlanta Esports Ventures, FaZe Clan
Boston Breach	(United States) Boston, MA	2022	Kraft Sports Group
Carolina Royal Ravens	(United States) Charlotte, NC	2020	ReKTGlobal, Inc.
Los Angeles Guerrillas	(United States) Los Angeles, CA	2020	Kroenke Sports & Entertainment
Los Angeles Thieves	(United States) Los Angeles, CA	2021	100 Thieves
Miami Heretics	(United States) Miami, FL	2020	Misfits Gaming, Team Heretics
Minnesota ROKKR	(United States) Minneapolis-Saint Paul, MN	2020	G2 Esports
New York Subliners	(United States) New York City, NY	2020	NYXL
OpTic Texas	(United States) Dallas, TX	2020	OpTic Gaming
Seattle Surge	(United States) Seattle, WA	2020	Canucks Sports & Entertainment, Enthusiast Gaming
Toronto Ultra	(Canada) Toronto, ON	2020	OverActive Media
Vegas Legion	(United States) Las Vegas, NV	2020	c0ntact Gaming

== Regular season ==
The 2024 CDL season began on December 8, 2023. Teams compete in four Majors throughout the season, culminating in the Call of Duty Championship tournament. The four Majors will be played in Boston, Miami, Toronto and Burbank (Note: The fourth Major was supposed to be held in Charlotte, North Carolina and hosted by the Carolina Royal Ravens, but was later pulled from Charlotte and relocated to Burbank, California (without fans).).

== Standings ==
2024 Call of Duty League standings
#	Team	Pts	EP	MW	ML	M%	GW	GL	G%
1	Atlanta FaZe	560	4	37	8	.822	126	52	.708
2	Toronto Ultra	495	4	35	10	.778	112	56	.667
3	OpTic Texas	415	4	29	16	.644	109	78	.583
4	New York Subliners	395	4	30	16	.652	108	76	.587
5	Seattle Surge	200	4	16	24	.400	70	90	.438
6	Los Angeles Guerrillas	200	4	14	26	.350	57	91	.385
7	Los Angeles Thieves	195	4	17	20	.459	69	84	.451
8	Miami Heretics	185	4	17	22	.436	69	82	.457
9	Vegas Legion	165	4	15	22	.405	65	79	.451
10	Carolina Royal Ravens	150	4	13	24	.351	65	88	.425
11	Minnesota Rokkr	140	4	11	25	.306	56	90	.384
12	Boston Breach	60	4	6	27	.182	47	87	.351

As of 30 June 2024

== Major 1 ==
Stage 1 group stage began on December 8, 2023, and ended on January 21.

=== Online qualifiers ===
Pos	Team	Overall Series	Overall Games	Qualification
1	Atlanta FaZe	7–0	21–5	Winners Round 1 Seed
2	Toronto Ultra	6–1	18–6	Winners Round 1 Seed
3	New York Subliners	6–1	18–11	Winners Round 1 Seed
4	Miami Heretics	5–2	18–8	Winners Round 1 Seed
5	OpTic Texas	4–3	14–13	Winners Round 1 Seed
6	Minnesota ROKKR	3–4	14–14	Winners Round 1 Seed
7	Seattle Surge	3–4	13–16	Winners Round 1 Seed
8	Los Angeles Guerrillas	2–5	9–16	Winners Round 1 Seed
9	Los Angeles Thieves	2–5	9–17	Losers Round 1 Seed
10	Boston Breach	2–5	12–16	Losers Round 1 Seed
11	Carolina Royal Ravens	1–6	7–20	Losers Round 1 Seed
12	Vegas Legion	1–6	9–20	Losers Round 1 Seed

=== Major ===
Major 1 ran from January 25 to January 28, 2024. The Major was hosted by Boston Breach. The Major I champions were the Toronto Ultra, who defeated the Atlanta FaZe 4-1. The MVP was Tobias Juul Jonsson aka "CleanX".

Upper round 1	Upper round 2	Upper final	Final
1	Atlanta FaZe	3
8	Los Angeles Guerrillas	0
1	Atlanta FaZe	3
5	OpTic Texas	2
4	Miami Heretics	0
5	OpTic Texas	3
1	Atlanta FaZe	1
2	Toronto Ultra	3
2	Toronto Ultra	3
7	Seattle Surge	0
2	Toronto Ultra	3
6	Minnesota ROKKR	0
3	New York Subliners	0
6	Minnesota ROKKR	3
1	Atlanta FaZe	1
2	Toronto Ultra	4
Lower round 1	Lower round 2	Lower round 3	Lower round 4	Lower final
8	Los Angeles Guerrillas	3
8	Los Angeles Guerrillas	2
9	Los Angeles Thieves	1
8	Los Angeles Guerrillas	3	6	Minnesota ROKKR	3
12	Las Vegas Legion	2	1	Atlanta FaZe	3
4	Miami Heretics	0
6	Minnesota ROKKR	1	5	OpTic Texas	0
12	Vegas Legion	3
5	OpTic Texas	3
7	Seattle Surge	3
7	Seattle Surge	1
10	Boston Breach	2
7	Seattle Surge	3	5	OpTic Texas	3
11	Carolina Royal Ravens	2
3	New York Subliners	1
11	Carolina Royal Ravens	3

== Major 2 ==
Stage 2 group stage began on February 16, 2024, and ended on March 17.

=== Online qualifiers ===
Pos	Team	Overall Series	Overall Games	Qualification
1	OpTic Texas	7–0	21–10	Winners Round 1 Seed
2	New York Subliners	6–1	20–7	Winners Round 1 Seed
3	Atlanta FaZe	5–2	19–7	Winners Round 1 Seed
4	Toronto Ultra	5–2	17–10	Winners Round 1 Seed
5	Vegas Legion	5–2	17–10	Winners Round 1 Seed
6	Los Angeles Thieves	4–3	13–15	Winners Round 1 Seed
7	Boston Breach	3–4	11–15	Winners Round 1 Seed
8	Miami Heretics	2–5	11–16	Winners Round 1 Seed
9	Carolina Royal Ravens	2–5	11–17	Losers Round 1 Seed
10	Minnesota ROKKR	1–6	11–19	Losers Round 1 Seed
11	Los Angeles Guerrillas	1–6	7–20	Losers Round 1 Seed
12	Seattle Surge	1–6	6–18	Losers Round 1 Seed

=== Major ===
The Stage 2 Major ran between 21-24 March, 2024. The Major was hosted by Miami Heretics. The Major II champions were the Atlanta Faze, who defeated OpTic Texas 4-1. The MVP was Chris Lehr aka "Simp".

Upper round 1	Upper round 2	Upper final	Final
1	OpTic Texas	3
8	Miami Heretics	0
1	OpTic Texas	3
4	Toronto Ultra	1
4	Toronto Ultra	3
5	Vegas Legion	0
1	OpTic Texas	1
3	Atlanta FaZe	3
2	New York Subliners	3
7	Boston Breach	1
2	New York Subliners	2
3	Atlanta FaZe	3
3	Atlanta FaZe	3
6	Los Angeles Thieves	2
3	Atlanta FaZe	4
1	OpTic Texas	1
Lower round 1	Lower round 2	Lower round 3	Lower round 4	Lower final
8	Miami Heretics	0
2	New York Subliners	3
9	Carolina Royal Ravens	3
9	Carolina Royal Ravens	3	9	Carolina Royal Ravens	0
5	Las Vegas Legion	2	1	OpTic Texas	3
5	Las Vegas Legion	3
2	New York Subliners	3	2	New York Subliners	1
12	Seattle Surge	1
4	Toronto Ultra	0
7	Boston Breach	2
4	Toronto Ultra	3
10	Minnesota ROKKR	3
10	Minnesota ROKKR	1	11	Los Angeles Guerrillas	1
11	Los Angeles Guerrillas	3
6	Los Angeles Thieves	1
11	Los Angeles Guerrillas	3

== Major 3 ==
Stage 3 group stage began on April 12, 2024, and ended on May 12.

=== Online qualifiers ===
Pos	Team	Overall Series	Overall Games	Qualification
1	Atlanta FaZe	7–0	21–4	Winners Round 1 Seed
2	Toronto Ultra	6–1	18–6	Winners Round 1 Seed
3	OpTic Texas	6–1	19–8	Winners Round 1 Seed
4	Los Angeles Thieves	5–2	18–14	Winners Round 1 Seed
5	New York Subliners	3–4	14–13	Winners Round 1 Seed
6	Carolina Royal Ravens	3–4	15–15	Winners Round 1 Seed
7	Seattle Surge	3–4	13–15	Winners Round 1 Seed
8	Miami Heretics	3–4	13–16	Winners Round 1 Seed
9	Vegas Legion	2–5	8–17	Losers Round 1 Seed
10	Minnesota ROKKR	2–5	8–19	Losers Round 1 Seed
11	Los Angeles Guerrillas	2–5	7–17	Losers Round 1 Seed
12	Boston Breach	0–7	11–21	Losers Round 1 Seed

=== Major ===
The Stage 3 Major was held between 16 and 19 May, 2024. The Major is hosted by Toronto Ultra. The Major III champions were OpTic Texas, who defeated Toronto Ultra 4-0. The MVP was Anthony Cuevas-Castro aka "Shotzzy".

Upper round 1	Upper round 2	Upper final	Final
1	Atlanta FaZe	3
8	Miami Heretics	1
1	Atlanta FaZe	3
5	New York Subliners	0
4	Los Angeles Thieves	1
5	Vegas Legion	3
1	Atlanta FaZe	2
2	Toronto Ultra	3
2	Toronto Ultra	3
7	Seattle Surge	1
2	Toronto Ultra	3
3	OpTic Texas	1
3	OpTic Texas	3
6	Carolina Royal Ravens	1
2	Toronto Ultra	0
3	OpTic Texas	4
Lower round 1	Lower round 2	Lower round 3	Lower round 4	Lower final
8	Miami Heretics	3
3	Optic Texas	3
9	Vegas Legion	2
8	Miami Heretics	3	8	Miami Heretics	1
4	Los Angeles Thieves	1	1	Atlanta Faze	2
5	Los Angeles Thieves	3
3	OpTic Texas	3	3	OpTic Texas	3
12	Boston Breach	2
5	New York Subliners	2
7	Seattle Surge	3
5	New York Subliners	3
10	Minnesota ROKKR	1
7	Seattle Surge	3	7	Seattle Surge	1
6	Carolina Royal Ravens	1
6	Carolina Royal Ravens	3
11	Los Angeles Guerrillas	1

== Major 4 ==
Stage 4 group stage began on May 31, 2024, and ended on June 23.

=== Online qualifiers ===
Pos	Team	Overall Series	Overall Games	Qualification
1	Toronto Ultra	6–1	20–8	Winners Round 1 Seed
2	Atlanta FaZe	6–1	20–9	Winners Round 1 Seed
3	Seattle Surge	4–3	17–12	Winners Round 1 Seed
4	Los Angeles Thieves	4–3	16–14	Winners Round 1 Seed
5	Miami Heretics	4–3	14–13	Winners Round 1 Seed
6	Vegas Legion	4–3	13–13	Winners Round 1 Seed
7	New York Subliners	4–3	16–16	Winners Round 1 Seed
8	Los Angeles Guerrillas	3–4	12–14	Winners Round 1 Seed
9	Carolina Royal Ravens	3–4	16–17	Losers Round 1 Seed
10	Minnesota ROKKR	2–5	10–19	Losers Round 1 Seed
11	Boston Breach	1–6	6–20	Losers Round 1 Seed
12	OpTic Texas	1–6	13–18	Losers Round 1 Seed

=== Major ===
The Stage 4 Major was held between 16 and 19 May, 2024. The Major IV champions were New York Subliners, who defeated Atlanta FaZe 4-2. The MVP was Paco Rusiewiez aka "HyDra".

Upper round 1	Upper round 2	Upper final	Final
1	Toronto Ultra	1
8	Los Angeles Guerrillas	3
8	Los Angeles Guerrillas	3
4	Los Angeles Thieves	0
4	Los Angeles Thieves	3
5	Miami Heretics	1
8	Los Angeles Guerrillas	0
2	Atlanta FaZe	3
2	Atlanta FaZe	3
7	New York Subliners	0
2	Atlanta FaZe	3
3	Seattle Surge	0
3	Seattle Surge	3
6	Vegas Legion	2
2	Atlanta FaZe	2
7	New York Subliners	4
Lower round 1	Lower round 2	Lower round 3	Lower round 4	Lower final
1	Toronto Ultra	3
3	Seattle Surge	2
9	Carolina Royal Ravens	0
1	Toronto Ultra	3	1	Toronto Ultra	3
4	Miami Heretics	1	8	Los Angeles Guerrillas	0
5	Miami Heretics	3
1	Toronto Ultra	0	7	New York Subliners	3
12	OpTic Texas	2
7	New York Subliners	3
7	New York Subliners	3
4	Los Angeles Thieves	1
10	Minnesota ROKKR	1
7	New York Subliners	3	7	New York Subliners	3
6	Vegas Legion	1
6	Vegas Legion	3
11	Boston Breach	0

== Championship ==
The 2024 Call of Duty League Championship took place at the Credit Union of Texas Events Center in Allen, Texas, from 18 to 21 July. The results of this event also determined seeding for the MWIII tournament at the Esports World Cup in August.

=== Bracket ===
Winners Round 1	Winners Round 2	Winners Final	Final
1	Atlanta FaZe	3
8	Miami Heretics	1
1	Atlanta FaZe	2
4	New York Subliners	3
4	New York Subliners	3
5	Seattle Surge	2
4	New York Subliners	2
3	OpTic Texas	3
2	Toronto Ultra	1
7	Los Angeles Thieves	3
7	Los Angeles Thieves	2
3	OpTic Texas	3
3	OpTic Texas	3
6	Los Angeles Guerrillas	0	3	OpTic Texas	5
4	New York Subliners	1
Elimination Round 1	Elimination Round 2	Elimination Round 3	Elimination Final
7	Los Angeles Thieves	3
8	Miami Heretics	3	8	Miami Heretics	0	4	New York Subliners	3
5	Seattle Surge	2	7	Los Angeles Thieves	2	2	Toronto Ultra	2
2	Toronto Ultra	3
1	Atlanta FaZe	0
2	Toronto Ultra	3	2	Toronto Ultra	3
6	Los Angeles Guerrillas	0

=== Grand finals ===
The 2024 Call of Duty League season Grand finals were held on July 21, 2024. It was best of 9 (first to 5).

Grand Finals	July 21	OpTic Texas	5	–	1	New York Subliners
	12:00 PDT/15:00 EDT (19:00 UTC)					
		250	Karachi - Hardpoint			212
		6	Karachi - Search & Destroy			5
		1	Karachi - Control			3
		250	Rio - Hardpoint			130
		6	Invasion - Search & Destroy			3
		3	Invasion - Control			2
