= Epsilon Esports =

Professional esports organisation

- Short name: Epsilon
- Divisions: Call of Duty, FIFA, Gears of War, H1Z1
- Founded: 2008
- Based in: Brussels, Belgium
- CEO: Gregory Champagne
- Website: www.epsilon-esports.com

Epsilon Esports is a professional esports organisation that has teams competing in Call of Duty, FIFA, Gears of War and H1Z1. It is an organisation in console esports, with multiple championship Call of Duty championships achieved from 2011 to 2014. Epsilon's Smite team won the Smite World Championship 2016. The organisation is headquartered in Brussels, Belgium, but individual teams are based across Europe and North America.

== Overview ==
The organisation was founded in 2008 by Gregory Champagne, an ex-Tribes player.

In early 2010, Epsilon signed the first big significant deal with Razer, creating a first of many partnerships to come with different brands. While Epsilon was originally built on the Battlefield Series and Team Fortress 2 success, it made the determining move to go in Console, signing a Call of Duty Irish Team composed with players such as Jurd. The team had a good run at the World Championships, ultimately having the best European Call of Duty Finish of all time.

In 2014, Epsilon became the first exclusive esports team of Viewsonic, developing new gaming monitors with the French CounterStrike Global Offensive player Richard "Shox" Papillion.

In mid 2015, Epsilon signed the Challenger Smite Team Panthera, to eventually became 2016 Smite World Champions.

In early 2016, Creative (SoundBlasterX) became sponsor of Epsilon.

In mid 2016, Hype Energy became the main sponsor of Epsilon. The team runs the Hype Energy logo on the front of player jerseys and also on the shoulder.

In October 2016, Epsilon announced a partnership with AS Monaco where Epsilon's FIFA players would also represent the football club by wearing their jerseys. Daxe was also sold to PSG Esports around this time.
