= Smite (video game) =

2014 video game

- Developer: Titan Forge Games
- Publishers: Hi-Rez Studios; Tencent Games (China)
- Engine: Unreal Engine 3
- Platforms: Windows; Xbox One; PlayStation 4; Nintendo Switch; Amazon Luna
- Release: Microsoft Windows; March 25, 2014; Xbox One; August 19, 2015; PlayStation 4; May 31, 2016; Nintendo Switch; February 18, 2019 Amazon Luna September 9, 2021
- Genre: Multiplayer online battle arena
- Mode: Multiplayer

Smite is a 2014 free-to-play third-person multiplayer online battle arena (MOBA) video game developed and published by Hi-Rez Studios for Microsoft Windows, Xbox One, PlayStation 4, Nintendo Switch, and Amazon Luna. In Smite, players control a god, goddess or other mythological figure and take part in team-based combat, using their abilities and tactics against other player-controlled gods and non-player-controlled minions. In most gamemodes, victory is achieved by slaying the opposing team's titan before losing their own.

The game has multiple player versus player (PVP) modes, 130 playable gods, and has a successful esports scene with multiple tournaments, including the annual million-dollar Smite World Championship. As of 2020, Smite has attracted a total of 40 million players. A sequel, Smite 2, was first announced in January 2024, and entered Open Beta in January 2025.

== Gameplay ==
Smite features many different game modes with the largest being Conquest. Players can choose between Training (vs AI), Custom, Co-Op (with clan/friends), Normal and Ranked play styles. From there, they can choose between a variety of standard game modes. Special event games with unique rules like unlimited gold are also often introduced.

At the beginning of each match, players select a god or other mythological figure to play as. As of December 2023, players can choose between a large variety of characters from different pantheons including, but not limited to, Babylonian, Celtic, Chinese, Egyptian, Greek, Hindu, Japanese, Norse, Polynesian, Roman, Mayan, Slavic, Voodoo, and Yoruba. The characters of King Arthur's legends (referred to as the Arthurian pantheon in-game) and the Cthulhu Mythos (referred to as the pantheon of the Great Old Ones) are also considered pantheons in this video game.

Each character is classified as one of the following classes: Assassin, Guardian, Hunter, Mage, or Warrior. Unless otherwise stated, two players on the same team cannot choose the same character (in competitive modes and those using a Draft pick method, each player must use a different character). Successful team configurations typically feature a well-rounded team following standard RPG raid configurations (tank, healer, physical/magical damage) during god selection.

While most MOBA games are played from a top-down perspective, in Smite, the player controls the god in a third-person perspective. Each god has a basic attack, a passive trait, and four abilities with varying effects (area damage, crowd control, status effects, etc.). These abilities are acquired and upgraded when the player's character levels up by gaining experience from being in range of minions when they are killed, taking down towers or phoenixes and defeating enemy characters. The maximum level is 20 and each successive level is more difficult to reach. Each player also accumulates gold through standard periodic income and by slaying enemies (player and NPC alike); gold is used to buy items for their god, as well as potions, wards and abilities.

Each game mode has a specific map it is played on, which is separated into "lanes", where waves of computer-controlled minions march toward the enemy base, and the "jungle", where computer-controlled monsters periodically spawn at specific locations distributed symmetrically across the map. Killing monsters in said jungle grants experience points and gold; killing certain monsters causes a "buff" to drop on the ground which, when picked up by a player, grants temporary bonuses to stats such as damage dealt, movement speed, and attack speed. There are three special monsters who appear less frequently that grant the team which lands the killing blow a set amount of gold, as well as a temporary damage buff and speed boost when coming out of the base.

=== Conquest ===
Conquest is the default game mode and follows the standard gameplay of MOBA games, being played on a three-lane map based on Warcraft III's Defense of the Ancients map. Two teams of five players begin at opposite sides of the map, at their team's "fountain," and are granted a set amount of gold to buy starting items. There are three continuous "lanes" running from one side of the map to the other, each defended by towers and a "phoenix", both of which deal damage to enemies that come too close.

The game is won by killing the opposing team's titan, a giant warrior located in each team's base. To accomplish this, the players must first destroy the towers and phoenixes guarding the enemy base. The player teams are accompanied by "minions", small soldiers with a weak attack, who spawn at the phoenixes every thirty seconds and run along their lane towards the enemy base, attacking not only enemy players and other minions but also towers, phoenixes and the titan. Towers will prioritize targeting enemy minions over players, allowing players to attack a tower without receiving damage, unless the players attack an enemy player within the enemy tower's range.

Teams can surrender games at any time after ten minutes, provided at least four players agree. If a player loses connection to the game, two players on either team can choose to pause the game for up to thirty seconds to allow the disconnected player to return. If a team has disconnected players, they can surrender within six minutes and with an adjusted majority requirement.

=== Slash ===
Slash resembles Conquest, but is played on a map with only two lanes, and teams each have two towers, two phoenixes, and a titan. Each team also has their own jungle, while three contested jungles are located in the center (called "left", "right" and "mid"). Players start at level 3 and the middle jungle gets stronger as the match goes on, eventually spawning the boss Apophis. Additional jungle bosses around the map spawn more powerful minions called siege juggernauts when killed, which can destroy towers and kill players and minions. The name Slash is a portmanteau of the two discontinued game modes that it is based on - Siege and Clash; Slash replaced these modes in 2022.

=== Joust ===
Joust features two teams of three players and is played on a map with only one lane (and a jungle on either side). Teams have one tower, one phoenix and a titan each. Players also start at level 3, due to the smaller map size and increased focus on combat. There is a jungle boss called Bull Demon King in the side lane that renders the opposing team's tower or phoenix unable to attack enemy minions or players. This boss also provides a team buff that gives both health and mana regeneration.

=== Assault ===
Assault is similar to Joust, being played on a one-lane map, but players are unable to choose their god, instead being assigned a random one at the start of the match. It is played on a one-lane map with two teams of five; teams have two towers, one phoenix, and a titan each. There are no jungle camps and the only goal is to push the minion waves forwards and destroy all of the enemy structures, with the game ending at the death of a Titan. Additionally, once a player has left the fountain, they cannot buy items until they die, and they cannot return to their base to regenerate their health.

=== Arena ===
Arena has two teams of five players face each other in an open arena without towers or Titans. Instead, each team has a portal they must defend and a stream of minions that march towards the enemy's portal. Each team starts with a stock of five hundred points, and the game is won by reducing enemy team's point total to zero. One point is deducted from the enemy team each time one of their minions die or when an enemy minion enters their portal, and five points are deducted per death of a god. Teams can also spawn minotaurs after collectively killing ten enemy gods, which deduct fifteen points from the enemy team upon reaching their portal. There are three jungle camps on each side of the map (left and right) that drop player buffs when slain. At the start of the match, a Rogue’s Stash will spawn near a random jungle camp that awards a set amount of gold and spawns a computer-controlled "Cyclops Rogue" monster.

Passive gold income is greatly increased for this game mode and the spawn timers are greatly decreased. Each god starts at level three, has more starting gold than other game modes, and gains experience passively.

=== List of gods ===
Character	Pantheon
Achilles	Greek
Agni	Hindu
Ah Muzen Cab	Mayan
Ah Puch	Mayan
Amaterasu	Japanese
Anhur	Egyptian
Anubis	Egyptian
Ao Kuang	Chinese
Aphrodite	Greek
Apollo	Greek
Arachne	Greek
Ares	Greek
Artemis	Greek
Artio	Celtic
Athena	Greek
Atlas	Greek
Awilix	Mayan
Baba Yaga	Slavic
Bacchus	Roman
Bakasura	Hindu
Bake kujira	Japanese
Baron Samedi	Voodoo
Bastet	Egyptian
Bellona	Roman
Cabrakan	Mayan
Camazotz	Mayan
Cerberus	Greek
Cernunnos	Celtic
Chaac	Mayan
Chang'e	Chinese
Charon	Greek
Charybdis	Greek
Chernabog	Slavic
Chiron	Greek
Chronos	Greek
Cliodnha	Celtic
Cthulhu	Great Old Ones
Cu Chulainn	Celtic
Cupid	Roman
Da Ji	Chinese
Danzaburou	Japanese
Discordia	Roman
Erlang Shen	Chinese
Eset*	Egyptian
Fafnir	Norse
Fenrir	Norse
Freya	Norse
Ganesha	Hindu
Geb	Egyptian
Gilgamesh	Babylonian
Guan Yu	Chinese
Hachiman	Japanese
Hades	Greek
He Bo	Chinese
Heimdallr	Norse
Hel	Norse
Hera	Greek
Hercules	Roman
Horus	Egyptian
Hou Yi	Chinese
Hub Batz	Mayan
Ishtar	Babylonian
Ix Chel	Mayan
Izanami	Japanese
Janus	Roman
Jing Wei	Chinese
Jormungandr	Norse
Kali	Hindu
Khepri	Egyptian
King Arthur	Arthurian
Kukulkan	Mayan
Kumbhakarna	Hindu
Kuzenbo	Japanese
Lancelot	Arthurian
Loki	Norse
Maman Brigitte	Voodoo
Martichoras	Greek
Maui	Polynesian
Medusa	Greek
Mercury	Roman
Merlin	Arthurian
Morgan Le Fay	Arthurian
Mulan	Chinese
Ne Zha	Chinese
Neith	Egyptian
Nemesis	Greek
Nike	Greek
Nox	Roman
Nut	Egyptian
Nu Wa	Chinese
Odin	Norse
Olorun	Yoruba
Osiris	Egyptian
Pele	Polynesian
Persephone	Greek
Poseidon	Greek
Ra	Egyptian
Raijin	Japanese
Rama	Hindu
Ratatoskr	Norse
Ravana	Hindu
Scylla	Greek
Serqet	Egyptian
Set	Egyptian
Shiva	Hindu
Skadi	Norse
Sobek	Egyptian
Sol	Norse
Son Wukong	Chinese
Surtr	Norse
Susano	Japanese
Sylvanus	Roman
Terra	Roman
Thanatos	Greek
The Morrigan	Celtic
Thor	Norse
Thoth	Egyptian
Tiamat	Babylonian
Tsukuyomi	Japanese
Tyr	Norse
Ullr	Norse
Vamana	Hindu
Vulcan	Roman
Xbalanque	Mayan
Xing Tian	Chinese
Yemoja	Yoruba
Ymir	Norse
Yu Huang	Chinese
Zeus	Greek
Zhong Kui	Chinese

Eset was originally called by one of her alternative names, Isis, but this was changed to avoid association with the extremist group Islamic State.

=== Matchmaking ===
The matchmaking system uses a modified version of the TrueSkill ranking system. Originally, most modes operated on queues with three-minute matchmaking timers; every three minutes, matches would be made from the group of people in queue at that time. In late 2014, this system was replaced with a more common strategy that looks for an optimal match instead of just the best match-ups at the present time. In this system, if it takes five minutes or more to match a player, the game will gradually lower its requirements until a match is found. In 2018, the system was modified to have different time requirements for different modes. The system will prioritize the player's general performance over their account level.

In Ranked Leagues, players are matched by a variation of Elo, a system that rates individual skill of each player based on wins and losses. While the Elo ranking is per-individual, the matchmaking system's goal is to create matches with each team having a similar total Elo ranking, potentially leading to individual disparity within or between teams. Ranked mode is available for Conquest and Joust.

In addition to the matchmaking mechanics, Smite features a structured ranking system in its Ranked Leagues, with specific entry requirements and rules. Players must be Level 30, own a minimum of 20 gods at Mastery Level 2 or higher, and have played at least 30 Normal (PvP) Conquest matches. The ranks progress from Bronze to Grandmaster, each divided into five sub-tiers (I-V), denoted by Roman numerals. Ranked matches use a 10 ban draft pick system. Players earn Tribute Points (TP) from ranked wins, needing over 100 TP to advance through each sub-tier. Players new to Ranked start in Bronze 3 with 1500 MMR. Losing games at 0 TP may result in demotion.

== Release ==
Smite was made available on May 31 of 2012 with a closed beta and transitioned into open beta on January 24, 2013. The game was officially released on March 25, 2014, with approximately 3 million players, and reached 4 million players in June. By 2015, more than 10 million players had played Smite. In June 2016, Hi-Rez Studios announced that the game had attracted 20 million players. In 2019, the game surpassed 30 million players and generated 300 million dollars. In April 2020, Hi-Rez reported that the game had over 40 million players.

=== International expansion ===
On August 21, 2013, Hi-Rez Studios partnered with Tencent, an online media company that publishes video games in China. On June 5, 2014, Hi-Rez Studios announced a partnership with Level Up! Games to bring the game to the Latin American region. In October 2014, Oceanic servers were added and in August 2016 southeast Asian servers were added. In October 2017, the Chinese client was announced to be merged with the international client, with migration taking place late November.

=== Esports ===
In mid-2014, Hi-Rez Studios implemented a system by which players could join professional leagues in teams of 5. Players first played in online competitions, then progressed to offline competitions. Teams were ranked according to how well they did within these competitions, and the top teams were invited to compete in the Smite World Championship. Hi-Rez Studios hosted the first Smite World Championship on January 9, 2015. Teams from North America, South America, Europe and China travelled to Atlanta for the tournament. The $2.6 million prize pool for the tournament was at the time the third-highest in esports, behind the third and fourth iterations of Dota 2's The International and just slightly ahead of the League of Legends World Championships. One of the North American teams, COGnitive Prime, took home the first place prize of over $1.3 million.

In July 2015, Stew Chisam, president of Hi-Rez Studios, announced that after discussing the prizing structure of Smite esports with team owners, players and members of other esports communities, Hi-Rez would be placing a cap on the prize pool for the Smite World Championships at $1 million. This decision was based to pay out more money to more players throughout the year instead of paying the bulk of earned prize money at a single event.

In January 2016, the Smite World Championship was held, returning to Atlanta, with the total prize of $1 million awarded.

The Smite Pro League (SPL) transitioned to a franchise model, managed by Hi-Rez Studios, beginning with Season 8. This marked a departure from the league's prior format of third-party organization-represented teams. The new model involved direct ownership and operation of teams by Hi-Rez, leading to an increase in social media engagement and streamlined operations in areas like visa processing. This change allowed for closer player engagement and more effective long-term strategic planning, enhancing the stability and future prospects of the SPL.

=== Business model ===
Smite is a freemium game that is free to play but has in-game purchases for player skins, boost and more. It has two in-game currencies – gems and favor. Each has a different value and can be used to purchase different in-game items.

Gods in the free version are available on a monthly rotating basis, with only a dozen playable gods available at any given time. Players can pay to unlock gods, bonus skins, emotes, character taunts/dances, and access to Odyssey and Battle Pass quests.Many of these skins are limited editions and related to special events (for example, a skin given only to 2015 convention attendees).

During its beta phase in 2013, the company sold lifetime passes for $29.99 to unlock all future gods. As of December 2023, there are 129 selectable gods in five classes: Assassin, Warrior, Guardian, Mage and Hunter.

Many skins represent brand partnerships including Monstercat, RWBY, Teenage Mutant Ninja Turtles, Bob Ross, Stranger Things, Avatar: the Last Airbender, Transformers, Slipknot and Nickelodeon. As of 2019, the game generated $300 million in revenue for Hi-Rez Studios and created over 450 jobs.

== Reception ==
Reception

Aggregate score
Aggregator	Score
Metacritic	PC: 83/100; XONE: 80/100; PS4: 79/100

Review scores
Publication	Score
Destructoid	XONE: 7/10
GameSpot	8/10
GamesRadar+	XONE: 4/5
IGN	8.5/10
Jeuxvideo.com	17/20
Nintendo Life	6.5/10
PC Gamer (US)	86/100

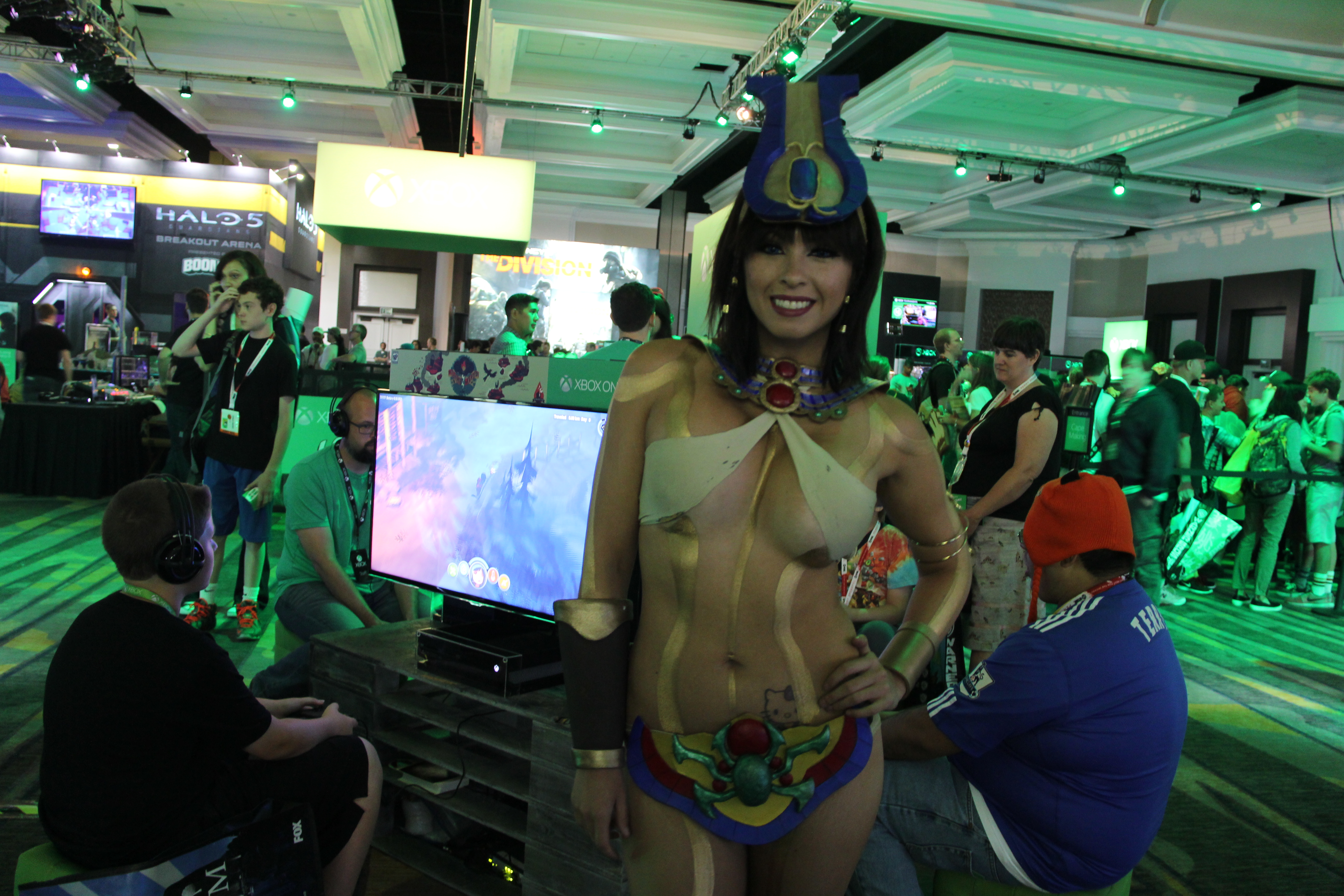
Cosplay of Neith, an Egyptian goddess featured in the game

Smite received generally favorable reviews from critics. The game currently holds a score of 83 out of 100 on Metacritic, based on a dozen reviews by major video game critics.

Leah B. Jackson of IGN rated the game 8/10 and wrote that she was delighted with the wide variety of different gods and the detailed models, indicating "A new perspective on familiar game design can make everything feel fresh, and Smite doesn't stop there". Wes Fenlon from PCGamer rated the game 86/100, criticizing the low entry barriers for ranked games and emphasizes Smite's moderate willingness to provide new players with an easy entry into the MOBA genre. Keith Milburn from NZGamer reports some IA issues on the PlayStation 4 version that made the game less fluid. He praises the mixture of elements in Smite with PvE to create a pleasant chaos, which scores with MMO-like elements. Paulmichael Contreras from PlayStation Life Style describes the free-to-play model from Smite as a fair system without falling into the area of "pay-to-win". Champions that can be bought extra fit well into the game balance without being clearly better than others, especially since paying for game content is just an additional option. Implementation on the various platforms is also highlighted. GamesRadar+ listed in their top "Free PS4 games: The best titles you can download without paying a thing", saying "With a current line-up of 93 playable hero deities covering ranged and melee archetypes (with separate magical and physical combat types), spread over five distinct classes, there's a huge amount of tactical team play to get stuck into. The free-to-play model is pretty damn pleasant, too". Digital Trends listed Smite in their top "The best free-to-play games for 2020", indicating that "Smite has been a mainstay in the MOBA genre since 2014. It stands out for its third-person presentation, differentiating itself from League, Heroes of the Storm, and Dota 2". CulturedVultures ranked Smite fourth in their list of the top "20 Best Free Games On Steam". TheGamer listed the game 7th in their top 10 "Free-to-Play Switch Games Actually Worth the Grind".

=== Hindu controversy ===
In June 2012, some Hindu leaders were upset by the inclusion of several Hindu gods in Smite and the fact that they are player-controlled. The deities that were in question were Kali, Agni and Vamana (the only playable Hindu deities at the time) and there was particular opposition to how Kali was dressed. Rajan Zed, the president of Universal Society of Hinduism, released a statement urging Hi-Rez to remove these gods from the game, claiming that since players controlling the gods was offensive.

In response, Hi-Rez CEO Todd Harris said:

Smite includes deities inspired from a diverse and ever expanding set of pantheons including Greek, Chinese, Egyptian, and Norse. Hinduism, being one of the world's oldest, largest and most diverse traditions, also provides inspiration toward deities in our game. In fact, given Hinduism's concept of a single truth with multiple physical manifestations one could validly interpret ALL the gods within Smite to be Hindu. And all gods outside of Smite as well. Ponder that for a minute. Anyway, going forward Smite will include even more deities, not fewer.

Despite the response from Hi-Rez, Rajan Zed was joined by Rabbi Elizabeth Beyer and Buddhist Jikai Phil Bryan in condemning the game's content as offensive. These leaders have labelled the old Kali model as being depicted in a "pornographic style," which appeared to be their main concern. The Kali character went under a major art and gameplay overhaul in December 2013, which included more concealing armour. Despite the protests, Hi-Rez has continued to expand the Hindu Pantheon roster, with its most recent addition being Shiva.

=== Accolades ===
Year	Award	Category	Result	Ref(s).
2016	BAFTA	AMD eSports Audience Award	Won	
2016	Global Game Awards	Best MOBA	Nominated	
2017	Golden Joystick Awards	eSports Game of the Year	Nominated	
2018	Global Game Awards	Best MOBA	Third	
2019	Game Industry Awards	Best Social Game	Nominated	
2019	Global Game Awards	Best MOBA	Nominated	

== Sequel ==
A sequel, Smite 2, was announced in January 2024 at the Smite World Championship. It will be developed by Titan Forge Games in Unreal Engine 5. Additionally, Titan Forge Games have announced they plan to continue developing Smite alongside Smite 2. On January 14, 2025, the sequel became available as a free-to-play game after spending months as a paid early access title. Titan Forge announced in February 2025 that it planned to end development of Smite in favor of focusing on Smite 2's development.
