= List of battle royale games =

This is a list of battle royale games, sorted chronologically. A battle royale game is an online multiplayer video game genre that blends last-man-standing gameplay with the survival, exploration and scavenging elements of a survival game.

== Legend ==
Video game platforms
DROID	Android	iOS	iOS, iPhone, iPod, iPadOS, iPad, visionOS, Apple Vision Pro	LIN	Linux, SteamOS
NS	Nintendo Switch	OSX	macOS	PS4	PlayStation 4
PS5	PlayStation 5	Quest	Meta Quest / Oculus Quest family, including Oculus Rift	Stadia	Google Stadia
WEB	Browser game	WIN	Windows, all versions Windows 95 and up	XBO	Xbox One
XBX/S	Xbox Series X/S				

== Standalone games ==
Year	Initial release	Game	Developer	Publisher	Platform	Viewpoint (perspective)	Free-to-play	Notes
2017	March 23, 2017	PlayerUnknown's Battlegrounds	PUBG Corporation (Note: The mobile version was developed by LightSpeed & Quantum Studio, an internal division of Tencent Games.)	PUBG Corporation	WIN, PS4, PS5, XBO, XBX/S, DROID, iOS, Stadia	First-person / Third-person	Yes	The game is based on previous mods that were created by Brendan "PlayerUnknown" Greene for other games, inspired by the 2000 Japanese film Battle Royale, and expanded into a standalone game under Greene's creative direction.
2017	July 21, 2017	Fortnite Battle Royale	Epic Games	Epic Games	WIN, OSX, PS4, PS5, XBO, XBX/S, NS, DROID, iOS	Third-person	Yes	The player can build structures as defense or buildings. It is a companion game to Fortnite: Save the World.
2017	September 30, 2017 (Beta)	Garena Free Fire	111 Dot Studio	Garena	DROID, iOS	Third-person	Yes	Also known as Free Fire: Battlegrounds
2017	October 11, 2017	Surviv.io	Justin Kim and Nick Clark Kongregate	Justin Kim and Nick Clark Kongregate	WEB, WIN, OSX, DROID, iOS	Top-down	Yes	Heavily inspired by PlayerUnknown's Battlegrounds. Service for the official version of the game was halted in 2023.
2017	November 17, 2017 (Beta)	Rules of Survival	NetEase Games	NetEase Games	WIN, DROID, iOS	First-person / Third-person	Yes	
2017	December 1, 2017	Knives Out	NetEase Games	NetEase Games	WIN, DROID, iOS	First-person / Third-person	Yes	A PUBG clone.
2018	March 4, 2016 (Early access)	The Culling (video game)	Xaviant	Xaviant	WIN, LIN, XBO	First-person	No	
2018	June 5, 2018 (Beta)	Realm Royale	Heroic Leap Games	Hi-Rez Studios	WIN, OSX, PS4, XBO, NS	Third-person	Yes	The game is a spin-off of the hero shooter Paladins, where it originated as a game mode known as Paladins: Battlegrounds.
2018	June 5, 2018 (Beta)	Totally Accurate Battlegrounds (TABG)	Landfall Games	Landfall Games	WIN	First-person	Yes	A spin-off of Totally Accurate Battle Simulator (TABS) with heavily exaggerated physics. It became free to play in 2021
2018	January 15, 2015 (Early access)	Z1 Battle Royale	Daybreak Game Company	Daybreak Game Company	WIN, PS4	First-person	Yes	formerly known as H1Z1: King of the Kill
2018	August 3, 2018	Creative Destruction	NetEase Games	NetEase Games	WIN, DROID, iOS	First-person / Third-person	Yes	a Fortnite clone
2018	September 19, 2018 (Early access)	Ring of Elysium	Aurora Studios	Garena	WIN	First-person / Third-person	Yes	The game features extreme sports like BMX and snowboarding with deadly, dynamic weather.
2018	September 26, 2018	Battlerite Royale	Stunlock Studios	Stunlock Studios	WIN	Top-down Isometric	Yes	Battle royale mode based on the MOBA Battlerite.
2018	October 22, 2018 (Beta)	Cyber Hunter	NetEase Games	NetEase Games	WIN, DROID, iOS	First-person / Third-person	Yes	
2018	December 12, 2018	Brawl Stars	Supercell (video game company)	SuperCell	iOS, DROID	Third-person	Yes	Showdown mode in Brawl Stars for up to 10 players.
2019	February 4, 2019	Apex Legends	Respawn Entertainment	Electronic Arts	WIN, PS4, PS5, XBO, XBX/S, NS, DROID, (Note: in 2022) iOS	First-person	Yes	The game features squads of three players using pre-made characters, called "Legends".
2019	August 21, 2019	Rogue Heist	Lifelike Studios	Time2Play Gaming Studios	DROID, iOS, WIN	Third-person	Yes	Rogue Heist is a competitive third-person shooter set in a world of organized crime. The game is designed to promote teamwork between players in order to complete objectives.
2019	October 25, 2019	ScarFall - The Royale Combat	XSQUADS Tech Pvt Ltd	XSQUADS Tech Pvt Ltd	DROID, iOS	Third-person	Yes	A made-in-India battle royale game that gained traction after PUBG got banned in the country.
2019	December 12, 2019	CRSED: F.O.A.D.	Darkflow Studio	Gaijin Entertainment	WIN, XBO, XBX/S, PS4, PS5, NS	First-person / Third-person	Yes	
2020	January 14, 2020	Darwin Project	Scavengers Studio	Scavengers Studio	WIN, PS4, XBO	Third-person	Yes	
2020	March 10, 2020	Call of Duty: Warzone	Infinity Ward, Raven Software	Activision	WIN, PS4, XBO	First-person	Yes	The game is a part of the Call of Duty: Modern Warfare video game but does not require purchase of it.
2020	October 18, 2022 (Retired)	Hyper Scape	Ubisoft Montreal	Ubisoft	WIN, PS4, PS5, XBO, XBX/S	First-person	Yes	
2020	August 4, 2020	Fall Guys	Mediatonic	Devolver Digital	WIN, PS4	Third-person	Yes	Up to 60 players control jelly bean-like creatures and compete against each other in a series of challenges. It became free to play in 2022
2020	September 3, 2020	Spellbreak	Proletariat	Proletariat	WIN, PS4, XBO, NS	Third-person	Yes	Players use magical spells in place of guns, choosing from one of six classes wind, fire, ice, lightning, stone and toxic.
2020	September 18, 2020	Farlight 84	Lilith Games, Miracle Games	Miracle Games	WIN, DROID, iOS	Third-person	Yes	
2020	October 14, 2020	Eternal Return	Nimble Neuron	Nimble Neuron, Kakao Games	WIN	Top-down isometric	Yes	Battle royale with multiplayer online battle arena elements.
2020	October 22, 2020	Population: One	BigBox VR	BigBox VR	Quest	First-person	No	VR Battle Royale where you can climb, fly, and build.
2021	June 29, 2021	Sausage Man	XD Entertainment Pte Ltd	XD Entertainment Pte Ltd	DROID, iOS	Third-person	Yes	Wiggle Wiggle Sausage Battle
2021	August 11, 2021	Naraka: Bladepoint	24 Entertainment	NetEase Games Montreal	WIN	First-person	No	
2021	August 26, 2021	Super Animal Royale	Pixile Studios	Modus Games	OSX, WIN, NS, PS4, PS5, Stadia, XBO, XBX/S	Third-person	Yes	
2021	September 7, 2021 (Windows)	Vampire: The Masquerade – Bloodhunt	Sharkmob AB	Sharkmob AB	WIN	Third-person	Yes	Based in the World of Darkness universe.
2021	December 15, 2021	Babble Royale	Everybody House Games	Everybody House Games	WIN, OSX	Top-down	Yes	Battle royale word game.
2022	November 16, 2022	Call of Duty: Warzone (2022 video game)	Infinity Ward, Raven Software	Activision	WIN, PS4, XBO	First-person	Yes	It was a successor to 2020's Call of Duty: Warzone
2024	March 21, 2024	Call of Duty: Warzone Mobile	Activision Shanghai, Beenox, Digital Legends Entertainment,Solid State Studios	Activision	DROID, iOS	First-person	Yes	Mobile version based on Call of Duty: Warzone
2024	November 20, 2024 (Open Beta)	Supervive	TheoryCraft Games	TheoryCraft Games	WIN	Top-down	Yes	A Moba and BR mash up game, taking elements from games such as League of Legends, Apex Legends, and Hero Shooters like Overwatch. The game is played with premade Heroes called Hunters, and follows a format similar to Apex Legends with MOBA type characters instead.
2025	November 5, 2025	Sonic Rumble	Sega, Sonic Team, Rovio Entertainment	Sega	DROID, iOS, WIN	Third-person	Yes	A Sonic the Hedgehog battle royale game.

== Games with battle royale modes ==
The following is a list of games with battle royale modes or maps that are released as part of a larger, non battle royale game

Year	Initial release	Game	Developer	Publisher	Platform	Viewpoint (perspective)	Free-to-play	Notes
2018	April 1, 2018	Path of Exile: Royale	Grinding Gear Games	Grinding Gear Games	WIN, XBO, PS4, OSX	Top-down isometric	Yes	A battle royale mode in Path of Exile, initially released for April Fools Day 2018, but later fleshed out and re-released on July 16, 2021.
2018	June 7, 2018	Rec Royale (Rec Room)	Rec Room Inc.	Rec Room Inc.	WIN, PS4, PS5, XBO, XBX/S, iOS, Quest	First-person	Yes	A battle royale mode in Rec Room for up to 16 players (solo play) or 18 players (squads of 3 players).
2018	October 12, 2018	Blackout (Call of Duty: Black Ops 4)	Treyarch	Activision	WIN, PS4, XBO	First-person	No	A battle royale mode in Call of Duty: Black Ops 4.
2018	December 6, 2018	Danger Zone (Counter-Strike: Global Offensive)	Valve Corporation	Valve Corporation	WIN, OSX, LIN	First-person	Yes	A battle royale mode in Counter-Strike: Global Offensive for up to 16 or 18 players. It is possible to play with group of friends as a squad of two or three players, or to play solo.
2019	March 25, 2019	Firestorm (Battlefield V)	EA DICE	Electronic Arts	WIN, PS4, XBO	First-person	No	a battle royale mode in Battlefield V
2019	June 10, 2019	Nuclear Winter (Fallout 76)	Bethesda Game Studios	Bethesda Softworks	WIN, PS4, XBO	First-person / Third-person	No	A battle royale mode in Fallout 76.
2019	September 10, 2019	Red Death (Civilization VI)	Firaxis Games	2K Games	WIN, OSX, LIN, iOS, NS, PS4, XBO, DROID	Top-down	No	Turn-based strategy, game mode inspired by other battle royales.
2019	October 1, 2019	Call of Duty: Mobile	TiMi Studios	Activision	DROID, iOS	First-person / Third-person	Yes	
2019	December 12, 2019	The Eliminator (Forza Horizon 4)	Playground Games	Microsoft Studios	WIN, XBO, XBX/S	First-person / Third-person	No	Players drive around the game map collecting car upgrades as the round goes on. They can challenge others to head-to-head races to eliminate rivals. The player is disqualified if they either leave the safe zone after a given time limit, or lose a head-to-head race. After 10 players remain, head-to-heads will disable (any in course will be aborted) and a final sprint race will dictate the winners of the game mode.
2021	July 2, 2021 (DROID), August 18, 2021 (iOS)	Battlegrounds Mobile India	Krafton	Krafton	DROID, iOS	First-person / Third-person	Yes	Modified version of PUBG Mobile for the Indian market.
2021	November 5, 2021	The Eliminator (Forza Horizon 5)	Playground Games	Microsoft Studios	WIN, XBO, XBX/S	First-person / Third-person	No	Same rules as in Forza Horizon 4.
2024	March 19, 2024	World of Warcraft: Plunderstorm	Blizzard Entertainment	Blizzard Entertainment	WIN, OSX	Third-person	No	A pirate-themed Battle Royale game mode called Plunderstorm was released with patch 10.2.6. Players play separate characters specifically for Plunderstorm, rather than their usual characters.
