= 2026 in video games =

In the video game industry, 2026 continues trends resulting from the large-scale layoffs from previous years, as well as impacts on hardware and consoles due to limitations on computer memory availability. These impacts are expected to delay releases of new console hardware, and have pushed on AAA developers to consider optimizing games for less powerful hardware.

Major corporate changes include Microsoft significantly restructuring their Xbox division, trimming several studios to focus on core intellectual properties for Xbox and Windows, as well as Sony Interactive Entertainment backing away from physical media and cross platform releases for its first-party single-player games. A consortium including the Saudi Arabia Public Investment Fund wholly acquired Electronic Arts, leading to additional studio closures and job cuts. Paramount Skydance merged with Warner Bros. Discovery, merging and reducing staffing of their combined games divisions.

The year also saw the release of Grand Theft Auto VI in November, thirteen years after the previous entry, earning US$3.79 billion in day-one sales. Many high profile games shifted release dates to earlier in the year or into 2027 to avoid competing with GTA VI. The year also saw significant advancements in generative AI, allowing for games to be created through vibe coding, or even through decompiling and recompiling of executables, leading to concerns regarding copyrights, video game clones, and flooding of digital storefronts with "AI slop".

== Top-rated games ==
=== Critically acclaimed games ===
The following table lists the top-rated games released in 2026 based on Metacritic, which generally considers expansions as separate entities. The original versions of these games were released in 2026.

2026 releases scoring 90/100 or higher on Metacritic
| Title | Developer(s) | Publisher(s) | Release | Platform(s) | Average score |
|---|---|---|---|---|---|
| Grand Theft Auto VI | Rockstar Games | | November 19, 2026 | PS5, XBX/S | 99 |
| The Legend of Zelda: Ocarina of Time | Nintendo EPD | Nintendo | November 5, 2026 | NS2 | 95 |
| The Witcher 3: Wild Hunt - Remastered | CD Projekt Red, Yigsoft | CD Projekt Red | September 29, 2026 | WIN, NS2, PS5, XBX/S | 92 |
| Big Walk | House House | Panic | August 4, 2026 | WIN, OSX, NS2, PS5 | 91 |
| Doom: The Dark Ages – Revelations | id Software | Bethesda Softworks | July 6, 2026 | WIN, PS5, XBX/S | 91 |
| Forza Horizon 6 | Playground Games | Xbox Game Studios | May 19, 2026 | WIN, XBX/S | 90 |
| Mina the Hollower | Yacht Club Games | | May 29, 2026 | WIN, NS, NS2, PS4, PS5, XBO, XBX/S | 90 |
| Trails in the Sky 2nd Chapter | Nihon Falcom | GungHo Online Entertainment | September 17, 2026 | WIN, NS, NS2, PS5 | 90 |

=== Major awards ===
| Category | | 44th Golden Joystick Awards November 11, 2026 | The Game Awards 2026 December 10, 2026 | 30th Annual D.I.C.E. Awards February 18, 2027 | | 27th Annual Game Developers Choice Awards March 2, 2027 | 23rd British Academy Games Awards April, 2027 |
|---|---|---|---|---|---|---|---|
| Game of the Year | | Resident Evil Requiem | | | | | |
| Independent / Debut (Note: Some award presentations combine these categories.) | Indie | Meccha Chameleon (Note: Self-published Indie), Valheim | | | | | |
| Independent / Debut | Debut | Meccha Chameleon, Valheim | | | | | |
| Mobile | | —N/a | | | | —N/a | |
| VR / AR | | —N/a | | | | —N/a | |
| Artistic Achievement | Animation | Control Resonant | | | | | |
| Artistic Achievement | Art Direction | Control Resonant | | | | | |
| Audio | Music | Dispatch | | | | | |
| Audio | Sound Design | Onimusha: Way of the Sword | | | | | |
| Character or Performance | Leading Role | Angela Sant'Albano as Grace Ashcroft; Resident Evil Requiem | | | | —N/a | |
| Character or Performance | Supporting Role | Grace Saif as Diana; Pragmata | | | | —N/a | |
| Game Design or Direction | Game Design | —N/a | | | | | |
| Game Design or Direction | Game Direction | —N/a | | | | | |
| Narrative | | Dispatch | | | | | |
| Technical Achievement | | —N/a | | | | | |
| Multiplayer / Online | | Meccha Chameleon | | | | —N/a | |
| Action | | —N/a | | | | —N/a | |
| Adventure | | —N/a | | | | —N/a | |
| Family | | —N/a | | | | —N/a | |
| Fighting | | —N/a | | | | —N/a | |
| Role-Playing | | —N/a | | | | —N/a | |
| Sports / Racing | Sports | —N/a | | | | —N/a | |
| Sports / Racing | Racing | —N/a | | | | —N/a | |
| Strategy / Simulation | | —N/a | | | | —N/a | |
| Social Impact | | —N/a | | —N/a | | | |
| Special Award | | —N/a | Game Changer | Hall of Fame | Legend Award | Lifetime Achievement | BAFTA Fellowship |
| Special Award | | —N/a | | Shinji Mikami | Shigeru Miyamoto | | |

== Major events ==
| Month | Day(s) | Event |
|---|---|---|
| January | 13 | Meta announced the closure of the studios Armature Studio, Sanzaru Games, and Twisted Pixel. In addition, they announced more than 1,000 jobs would be laid off in their Reality Labs business. |
| January | 21 | Ubisoft announced a major restructuring into five creative houses. |
| February | 10–12 | The Academy of Interactive Arts & Sciences hosted the 2026 D.I.C.E. Summit and the 29th Annual D.I.C.E. Awards at the Aria Resort and Casino in Las Vegas, Nevada. |
| February | 19 | Sony Interactive Entertainment shut down Bluepoint Games. |
| February | 20 | Microsoft Gaming's Phil Spencer and Sarah Bond left the company, with Asha Sharma replacing Spencer, and Matt Booty promoted to chief content officer. The division was later rebranded to simply Xbox. |
| March | 9–21 | The Game Developers Conference, branded as "Festival of Gaming", was held in San Francisco, California. |
| March | 24 | Epic Games announced plans to lay off more than 1,000 employees in part due to reduced Fortnite engagement. |
| May | 21 | Following Sony issuing a $765 million impairment loss for Bungie, the studio announced it will be ending live support for Destiny 2 in June 2026, although the game will remain playable. Most of the Destiny's team and some from Marathon were laid off the following month as Sony restructured the studio. |
| June | 5–8 | Summer Game Fest 2026 was held at the Dolby Theatre in Los Angeles. |
| June | 16 | The European Commission declined to take any direct action following the Stop Killing Games initiative related to discontinuation of online games, but recommends developing voluntary practices with publishers and consumer groups. |
| July | 1 | Sony announced it will cease physical disc production for new PlayStation games in January 2028, and would close the PlayStation 3 and PlayStation Vita digital storefronts by July 2027. |
| July | 6 | Following Asha Sharma's announcement of a major reset of the Xbox division at Microsoft in June 2026, including pulling back towards console exclusivity and improving the financial performance for both Xbox and Xbox Game Studios, Microsoft announced it was laying off 1,600 Xbox employees now and another 1,600 over the next year. Further, within Xbox Game Studios, Double Fine and Compulsion Games were reverted to independent studios, while Undead Labs and Ninja Theory were sold off, and Arkane Studios's fate was in negotiations. |
| July | 6 | To comply with European right to repair laws, Nintendo announced the discontinuation of the Nintendo Switch and the release of a revised Nintendo Switch 2 with a user-replaceable battery. The latter was scheduled for mid-2026, while all original Nintendo Switch hardware will cease production in February 2027. |
| August | 4 | Electronic Arts closed its $55 billion leveraged buyout by a group of investors led by the Public Investment Fund. |
| August | 26–30 | Gamescom 2026 was held in Cologne, Germany. |
| September | 12–13 | Blizzard Entertainment held BlizzCon 2026 at Anaheim Convention Center in Anaheim, California. |
| September | 17–20 | The Tokyo Game Show was held at the Makuhari Messe in Chiba, Japan. Planned activity for the 21st was cancelled due to the anticipated arrival of Typhoon Dujuan. |
| October | 6 | Paramount Skydance completed its acquisition of Warner Bros. Discovery for $110 billion, becoming Skydance Corporation. This included merging of Warner Bros. Games and its studios with Paramount Games Studio, which lead to an unspecified number of layoffs in the following month. |
| October | 21 | Electronic Arts lays off 400 people and shuts down BioWare. |
| November | 17 | The 2026 Esports Awards are scheduled to be held in Miami, Florida. |
| December | 10 | The Game Awards 2026 is scheduled to be held at the Peacock Theater in Los Angeles. |

== Notable deaths ==
- February 10 – Shutaro Iida (a.k.a. Curry the Kid), 52, one of the main programmers of various Castlevania titles and the creative director of Bloodstained: Ritual of the Night and its upcoming prequel — Bloodstained: The Scarlet Engagement.
- February 13 – Hideki Sato, 75, Japanese businessman and engineer, recognized as major contributor to most of Sega's consoles.
- February 16 – Robert Duvall, 95, actor, best known for portraying Tom Hagen in The Godfather and its video game adaptation.
- March 17 – Yoran Heling (a.k.a. Yorhel), creator and maintainer of the Visual Novel Database.
- March 19 – Jock Blaney, 76, voice actor who voiced Wolf O'Donnell and Bill Grey in Star Fox 64.
- April 2 – Yoshihisa Kishimoto, 64, game developer and creator of the Kunio-kun and Double Dragon series.
- April 25 – Bill Wise, 61, voice actor who voiced Knuckles the Echidna in the English dub of Sonic the Hedgehog: The Movie (1996).
- May 18 – Tom Kane, 64, voice actor with numerous roles in film, television, and video games including Yoda in several Star Wars titles.
- June 16
  - Daveigh Chase, 35, voice actress who voiced Kiwako Seto in the English dub of Let It Die and Lilo Pelekai in Lilo & Stitch and several tie-in games based on the movie, such as Disney's Lilo & Stitch (GBA) and Lilo & Stitch: Trouble in Paradise.
  - Bobby Prince, 81, composer for several id Software games including Doom, Wolfenstein 3D and Duke Nukem games.
- June 19 – Claude Guillemot, 69, co-founder of Ubisoft.
- July 22 – İpek Yavuz, 54, co-founder of Turkish indie developer and publisher TaleWorlds Entertainment.
- August 16 − Hayden Panettiere, 36, actress who portrayed Samantha "Sam" Giddings in Until Dawn and its remake. She was also the English voice of Kairi and Xion in some of the Kingdom Hearts games.
- August 25 − Tim Curry, 80, actor who portrayed Colonel Anatoly Cherdenko in Command & Conquer: Red Alert 3 and the titular role in the Gabriel Knight series, along with roles in Brütal Legend and Dragon Age: Origins.
- August 26 − Peter Cullen, 85, the voice of Optimus Prime in the Transformers franchise and Eeyore in various Winnie the Pooh works, including video games.
- September 27 − Benjamin Satterley, 40, professional wrestler who appeared as "Neville" in the WWE 2K series and "Pac" in AEW Fight Forever.
- October 11 – Hiroshi Tsuchida, 54, voice actor with numerous roles in television, and video games including Kazuki in several Yakuza titles.
- October 12 – Richard "Levelord" Gray, 68, map and level designer for several 1990s and 2000s shooters, including Duke Nukem 3D.
- October 20 – Manuel Otto, 30, creator of Stick Run.
- October 25 – Eric Bauza, 46, voice actor known for voicing several Looney Tunes characters in multiple projects, as well as voicing characters in games such as Metal Gear Rising: Revengeance, Lightning Returns: Final Fantasy XIII, and Batman: Arkham City.
- October 26 – Walter Koenig, 90, actor who reprised his Star Trek role of Pavel Chekov in multiple video games.
- October 28 – Patrick Stewart, 86, thespian and actor who reprised his roles as Captain Jean-Luc Picard and Charles Xavier in multiple Star Trek and X-Men games, as well as Emperor Uriel Septum VII in The Elder Scrolls IV: Oblivion.

== Hardware releases ==
| Date | Console | Manufacturer | Ref. |
|---|---|---|---|
| June 29 | Steam Machine | Valve Corporation | |
| September 18 | Steam Frame | Valve Corporation | |

== Cancelled games ==
| Title | Platform(s) | Genre(s) | Developer(s) | Publisher(s) | Month cancelled | Ref. |
|---|---|---|---|---|---|---|
| Assassin's Creed Singularity | WIN, iOS, DROID | DCCG | Ubisoft Halifax | Ubisoft | January | (Note: Reported by Mike Straw.) |
| Prince of Persia: The Sands of Time | Unknown | Action-adventure | Ubisoft Montreal | Ubisoft | January | |
| Project Aether | Unknown | | Ubisoft Halifax | Ubisoft | January | |
| Project Crest | Unknown | Extraction shooter | Ubisoft Stockholm | Ubisoft | January | |
| Project U / Project Pathfinder | WIN | TPS | Ubisoft Annecy | Ubisoft | January | |
| Alterra | Unknown | Social sim | Ubisoft Montreal | Ubisoft | April | |
| Metro Rivals: New York | WIN, PS5, XBX/S | Racing, Simulation | Dovetail Games | | April | |
| Chrono Sword | WIN, NS, PS4, PS5, XBO, XBX/S | Soulslike, Action RPG | 21c.Ducks | CFK | May | |
| Untitled Dungeons & Dragons game | WIN | Action-adventure | Giant Skull | Wizards of the Coast | May | |
| Untitled Lord of the Rings MMORPG | Unknown | MMORPG | Amazon Games Orange County | Amazon Games | May | |
| Spellcasters Chronicles | WIN | MOBA, Action, Strategy | Quantic Dream | | May | |
| Ubusuna | PS4 | Shoot 'em up | M2 | | May | |
| Teenage Mutant Ninja Turtles: The Last Ronin (Note: A new version of the game is currently being developed by PlatinumGames, with Paramount Games Studio as publisher.) | WIN, PS5, XBX/S | Action RPG | Black Forest Games | THQ Nordic | June | |
| Armed Fantasia | WIN, PS5, XBX/S | RPG | Wild Bunch Productions | | September | |
| Untitled Battle Islands sequel | Unknown | Strategy | Unknown | 505 Games | September | |
| Directorate Novitiate | WIN | Action RPG | Nesting Games | | September | |
| Untitled Mass Effect game (Note: Presumably the game was titled Mass Effect Universe, according to the trailer that got leaked online after its cancellation.) | Unknown | Action RPG | BioWare | Electronic Arts | October | |
| Gang of Dragon (Note: While there was no official statement regarding the game's cancellation and the Steam page is still online, the studio behind the game was officially shut down, meaning the game's development is effectively ceased.) | WIN | Action-adventure | Nagoshi Studio | | October | |
| Ratchet & Clank: Ranger Rumble | iOS, DROID | TPS | Oh BiBi, Insomniac Games | Sony Interactive Entertainment | November | |
| Fairgames | WIN, PS5 | TPS | Haven Studios | Sony Interactive Entertainment | November | |

== Discontinued games ==
Games highlighted in bold indicate that the full game will be shut down.

| Title | Platform(s) | Genre(s) | Developer(s) | Publisher(s) | Shutdown date | Ref. |
|---|---|---|---|---|---|---|
| **Startplay** | WIN | GameMaker | Startplay | | January 1, 2026 | |
| **Anthem** | WIN, PS4, XBO | Action RPG | BioWare | Electronic Arts | January 12, 2026 | |
| **Panzer Kliker** | WIN | Idle | Peruns Forge | | January 18, 2026 | |
| **The Sims Mobile** | iOS, DROID | Social sim | Maxis, Firemonkeys Studios, Slingshot | Electronic Arts | January 20, 2026 | |
| Beat Saber | PS4, PS5 | Rhythm | Beat Games | Beat Games, Oculus Studios | January 26, 2026 | |
| **Boundary Warriors** | WIN | DCCG | NetEase Games | | January 28, 2026 | |
| **Onmyoji:The Card Game** | WIN | DCCG | NetEase Games | | January 28, 2026 | |
| **NBA Live 19** | PS4, XBO | Sports | EA Tiburon | Electronic Arts | January 30, 2026 | |
| **Orake Classic** | WIN | MMO | PigLion Games | | February 1, 2026 | |
| **Blade & Soul Heroes** | WIN, DROID, iOS | MMO | NCSoft | | February 19, 2026 | |
| **Super People** | WIN | Battle royale | Wonder Games | Wonder People | February 23, 2026 | |
| **Supervive** | WIN | Battle royale | Theorycraft Games | KR: Nexon; WW: NetEase | February 25, 2026 | |
| **Project CARS 3** | WIN, PS4, XBO | Racing | Slightly Mad Studios | Bandai Namco Entertainment | February 26, 2026 | |
| **Football Club Manager 26 LIVE** | WIN, OSX, PS5, XBX/S, iOS, DROID | Sports | Halfspace Games | | February 28, 2026 | |
| **Pandoland** | iOS, DROID | Action RPG | Game Freak, WonderPlanet | WonderPlanet | March 6, 2026 | |
| **Highguard** | WIN, PS5, XBX/S | Hero shooter | Wildlight Entertainment | | March 12, 2026 | |
| **Chronicles of the Celestial Way** | WIN | Action RPG | Tiandao | | March 12, 2026 | |
| **Howlbreath** | WIN | MMORPG | Howlbreath | | March 12, 2026 | |
| **King Arthur: Legends Rise** | WIN | RPG | Kabam Games | NetMarble | March 12, 2026 | |
| **Lightphobe** | WIN | Shooter | Allan Chew | | March 13, 2026 | |
| **Dirt 3** | WIN, OSX, PS3, XB360 | Racing | Codemasters | Codemasters, Feral Interactive (OSX) | March 16, 2026 | |
| **Dirt 4** | WIN, OSX, LIN, PS4, XBO | Racing | Codemasters | | March 16, 2026 | |
| **Occupy White Walls** | WIN | Art | Kultura | | March 16, 2026 | |
| The Finals | PS4 | FPS | Embark Studios | | March 18, 2026 | |
| **Real Racing 3** | iOS, DROID | Racing | Firemonkeys Studios, EA Mobile | Electronic Arts | March 20, 2026 | |
| **PUBG: Blindspot** | WIN | Tactical shooter | ARC Team | PUBG Corporation | March 30, 2026 | |
| **WWE 2K24** | WIN, PS4, PS5, XBO, XBX/S | Sports | Visual Concepts | 2K | March 31, 2026 | |
| **WBSC eBaseball: Power Pros** | NS, PS4 | Sports | Konami, Joymoa | JP: Konami; WW: 2K | March 31, 2026 | |
| **Zombie Army VR** | WIN, PS4, Quest | FPS, Survival horror | Rebellion, Xtended Realities | Rebellion | March 31, 2026 | |
| **INVERSE** | WIN | Horror | MASSVR | | March 31, 2026 | |
| **DuoQ** | WIN | FPS, Dating sim | The Duo Crew | USC Games | April 1, 2026 | |
| **Rift Investigations** | WIN | RPG | fp32.ai | | April 4, 2026 | |
| **FRENZIES** | Quest | Shooter | nDreams | | April 7, 2026 | |
| Genshin Impact | PS4 | Action RPG | miHoYo | HoYoverse | April 8, 2026 | |
| **King of Meat** | WIN, PS5, XBX/S | Action | Glowmade | Amazon Games | April 9, 2026 | |
| Fortnite: **Ballistic** | WIN, OSX, NS, PS4, PS5, XBO, XBX/S, DROID | FPS | Epic Games | | April 16, 2026 | |
| Fortnite: **Battle Stage** | WIN, OSX, NS, PS4, PS5, XBO, XBX/S, DROID | Rhythm | Harmonix | Epic Games | April 16, 2026 | |
| **Call of Duty: Warzone Mobile** | iOS, DROID | FPS | Activision | | April 17, 2026 | |
| **Granblue Fantasy: Versus** | WIN, PS4 | RPG | Arc System Works | Cygames | April 20, 2026 | |
| **R2Beat** | WIN | Rhythm, Racing | Valofe | | April 23, 2026 | |
| **Vampire: The Masquerade – Bloodhunt** | WIN, PS5 | Battle royale | Sharkmob | | April 28, 2026 | |
| Dragon Age: Inquisition | PS3 | Action RPG | BioWare | Electronic Arts | April 28, 2026 | |
| Plants vs. Zombies: Garden Warfare | PS3 | TPS | PopCap Vancouver | Electronic Arts | April 28, 2026 | |
| **CounterSide** | DROID, iOS, WIN | RPG | StudiobSide | | April 29, 2026 | |
| **Dragon Arena** | WIN | MOBA | EOAG Games | | April 30, 2026 | |
| **Raid One: 1 vs 5 Online Boss Battle** | WIN | MOBA | EOAG Games | | April 30, 2026 | |
| **Warhammer 40,000: Warpforge** | DROID, iOS, WIN | DCCG | Everguild | | April 30, 2026 | |
| Wildgate (China) | WIN | Shooter | Moonshot Games | Netease | April 30, 2026 | |
| Striden | WIN | Sandbox | 5 Fortress | Yahaha Games | April 30, 2026 | |
| **Stormgate** | WIN | Sandbox | Frost Giant Studios | | April 30, 2026 | |
| **Bobcos** | WIN | Sandbox | Phoave | | May 1, 2026 | |
| **Faehnor Online** | WIN | MMO | Wyrd Ark | | May 3, 2026 | |
| **Tombstone MMO** | WIN | MMOPRG | Well Bucket | RedTigerSpread | May 5, 2026 | |
| **The Cube, Save Us** | WIN | TPS | XLGames | | May 8, 2026 | |
| **Ayakashi Rise** | DROID, iOS | RPG | Clover Games | | May 9, 2026 | |
| **Heaven Hells** | DROID, iOS | RPG | Clover Games | | May 9, 2026 | |
| **Lord of Heroes** | DROID, iOS | RPG | Clover Games | | May 9, 2026 | |
| **Push3** | WIN | Puzzle | Torii Gate | | May 11, 2026 | |
| **Forsaken Island** | WIN | Survival | Torii Gate | | May 11, 2026 | |
| **Stone Age** | WIN | Survival | Torii Gate | | May 11, 2026 | |
| **Village Heroes** | WIN | MMO | CUNX | | May 18, 2026 | |
| **Chrono Sword (Early access)** | WIN, NS, PS4, PS5, XBO, XBX/S | Soulslike, Action RPG | 21c.Ducks | CFK | May 22, 2026 | |
| **Warface: Clutch** | WIN | FPS | Crytek Kiev, Blackwood Games | CIS: Astrum Entertainment; WW: MY.GAMES | May 27, 2026 | |
| **Source Wars** | WIN | MMO | YD Games | | May 30, 2026 | |
| **Match Gem 99** | WIN | Battle royale, Match-3 | Minimum Studio Corp | | May 30, 2026 | |
| **Ninja Party** | WIN | Beat 'em up | Nekki | | May 31, 2026 | |
| Stagdraft (Note: Only affects EU and Singapore servers and going forward the US server will be the main server) | WIN | Hack and slash | SteakSoft | | May 31, 2026 | |
| **Rec Room** | WIN, OSX, NS, PS4, PS5, XBO, XBX/S, DROID, iOS | Sandbox | Against Gravity | | June 1, 2026 | |
| **Mage Noir – Infinity** | WIN | DCCG | Double Combo Games | | June 1, 2026 | |
| Pinball M (Note: Only affects updates and new seasonal content) | PS4, XBO | Pinball | Zen Studios | | June 1, 2026 | |
| Pinball FX | PS4, XBO | Pinball | Zen Studios | | June 1, 2026 | |
| **Blade & Soul Heroes** | WIN, DROID, iOS | MMO | NCSoft | | June 16, 2026 | |
| **Spellcasters Chronicles (Early access)** | WIN | MOBA, Action, Strategy | Quantic Dream | | June 19, 2026 | |
| **Soccer Clubs** | WIN | Sports | Beijing Crazy Sports Industry Management Co., Ltd | | June 21, 2026 | |
| Battlefield Hardline | PS4, XBO | FPS | Visceral Games | Electronic Arts | June 22, 2026 | |
| **Plants vs. Zombies HD** | iOS | Tower defense | Electronic Arts | | June 24, 2026 | |
| **ASTRA: Knights of Veda** | WIN, DROID, iOS | RPG | FLINT | | June 26, 2026 | |
| **Blade & Soul 2** | WIN, DROID, iOS | MMORPG | NCSoft | | June 30, 2026 | |
| **Link! Like! Love Live!** | DROID, iOS | Rhythm | ODD No. | | June 30, 2026 | |
| **The Elder Scrolls: Blades** | NS, iOS, DROID | Action RPG | Bethesda Game Studios | Bethesda Softworks | June 30, 2026 | |
| **Shadowverse** | WIN, DROID, iOS | DCCG | Cygames | | June 30, 2026 | |
| **League of Angels – Heaven’s Fury** | WIN | Action RPG | Chengdu Dreamcaller Technology | Youzu Singapore | July 7, 2026 | |
| **Skyworld: Kingdom Brawl** | WIN | DCCG | Vertigo | | July 11, 2026 | |
| **Legend of Heavenly Destiny** | WIN | MMO | Cygames | | July 12, 2026 | |
| **Madden NFL 23** | WIN, PS4, PS5, XBO, XBX/S | Sports | EA Tiburon | EA Sports | July 13, 2026 | |
| **Eonica Chess Battle** | WIN | Chess | StandArts | | July 23, 2026 | |
| **Ancible Online** | WIN | MMOPRG | The Giants Drink | | July 26, 2026 | |
| **Book of Travels** | WIN | RPG | Might and Delight | | July 31, 2026 | |
| Apex Legends | NS | Battle royale, Hero shooter | Respawn Entertainment, Iron Galaxy | Electronic Arts | August 4, 2026 | |
| Aliens: Fireteam Elite | NS | TPS | Cold Iron Studios | WW: Cold Iron Studios; EU: Focus Home Interactive | August 5, 2026 | |
| **Tokyo 7th Sisters** | DROID, iOS | Rhythm | Donuts | | August 12, 2026 | |
| **Crazy Arcade** | WIN | Maze | Nexon | | August 13, 2026 | |
| **WWE 2K Battlegrounds** | WIN, NS, PS4, XBO | Sports | Saber Interactive | 2K | August 20, 2026 | |
| **NBA 2K Playgrounds 2** | WIN, NS, PS4, XBO | Sports | Saber Interactive | 2K | August 20, 2026 | |
| **Warface: Clutch** | NS, PS4, XBO | FPS | Crytek Kiev, Blackwood Games | CIS: Astrum Entertainment; WW: MY.GAMES | August 25, 2026 | |
| **Dong Wu: Odyssey** | WIN | Roguelike | Dong Wu Studio | SapStaR Games | August 31, 2026 | |
| **NHL 22** | PS4, PS5, XBO, XBX/S | Sports | EA Vancouver | EA Sports | August 31, 2026 | |
| **NHL 23** | PS4, PS5, XBO, XBX/S | Sports | EA Vancouver | EA Sports | August 31, 2026 | |
| Let It Die | WIN, PS4 | Roguelike, Hack and slash | Supertrick Games | GungHo Online Entertainment | September 1, 2026 | |
| **Castlevania: Grimoire of Souls** | iOS | Metroidvania | Konami | | September 3, 2026 | |
| **Grid Legends** | PS4, PS5, XBO, XBX/S | Racing | Codemasters | Electronic Arts | September 11, 2026 | |
| **Firewall Ultra** | PS5 | FPS | First Contact Entertainment | Sony Interactive Entertainment | September 17, 2026 | |
| **Sociable Soccer 25** | WIN, PS5, XBX/S, NS | Sports | Tower Studios | | September 28, 2026 | |
| **Final Fantasy XIV Mobile** (CN) (Note: Also the global version is no longer in development.) | DROID, iOS | MMORPG | LightSpeed Studios | Square Enix | September 30, 2026 | |
| **Mario Kart Tour** | DROID, iOS | Kart racing | Nintendo EPD | Nintendo | September 30, 2026 | |
| Fortnite: **Rocket Racing** | WIN, OSX, NS, PS4, PS5, XBO, XBX/S, DROID | Racing | Psyonix | Epic Games | October 1, 2026 | |
| **Final Fantasy VII: Ever Crisis** | WIN, DROID, iOS | RPG | Applibot, Square Enix | Square Enix | October 6, 2026 | |
| **Star Conflict** | WIN | MMO | Star Gem | Gaijin Network | October 10, 2026 | |
| **Looney Tunes: World of Mayhem** | iOS | RPG | Aquiris Game Studio | Scopely | October 15, 2026 | |
| Tower of Fantasy | PS4 | RPG | Hotta Studio | Perfect World | October 20, 2026 | |
| **The New Denpa Men** | NS, NS2, DROID, iOS | RPG | Genius Sonority | | December 6, 2026 | |
| **NBA 2K25** | WIN, NS, PS4, PS5, XBO, XBX/S | Sports | Visual Concepts | 2K | December 31, 2026 | |
| **Kingdomfall** | WIN | Fantasy | Labrintine | | 2026 | |
| **Sky Clash: Lords of Clans 3D** | WIN | Tower defense | Abolutist | AIVIK | 2026 | |

== Video game-based film and television releases ==
| Title | Release / premiere date | Type | Distributor | Franchise | Original game publisher | Ref. |
|---|---|---|---|---|---|---|
| Return to Silent Hill | January 23, 2026 | Live-action feature film | Cineverse | Silent Hill | Konami | |
| Sonic the Hedgehog Presents: The Chaotix Casefiles | January 27, 2026 | Podcast series | Realm Media | Sonic the Hedgehog | Sega | |
| Backyard Sports: The Animated Special | January 29, 2026 | Animated television special | YouTube | Backyard Sports | Playground Productions | |
| Iron Lung | January 30, 2026 | Live-action feature film | Markiplier Studios | Iron Lung | David Szymanski | |
| The Mortuary Assistant | February 13, 2026 | Live-action feature film | Shudder | The Mortuary Assistant | DreadXP | |
| The Super Mario Galaxy Movie | April 1, 2026 | Computer-animated feature film | Universal Pictures | Mario | Nintendo | |
| Needy Girl Overdose | April 5, 2026 | Anime television series | Aniplex of America | Needy Streamer Overload | WSS Playground | |
| Mortal Kombat II | May 8, 2026 | Live-action feature film | Warner Bros. Pictures | Mortal Kombat | Midway Games | |
| Among Us | June 5, 2026 | Adult animated television series | Paramount+ | Among Us | Innersloth | |
| 1999! Arcane Incident Department | August 2, 2026 | Anime television series | Youtube | Reverse: 1999 | Bluepoch | |
| Sekiro: No Defeat (JP) | September 4, 2026 | Anime film | Animec | Sekiro: Shadows Die Twice | JP: FromSoftware; WW: Activision | |
| Golden Axe | September 16, 2026 | Adult animated television series | Paramount+ | Golden Axe | Sega | |
| Resident Evil | September 18, 2026 | Live-action feature film | Sony Pictures Releasing | Resident Evil | Capcom | |
| Suikoden: The Anime | October 3, 2026 | Anime television series | NBCUniversal Entertainment Japan | Suikoden | Konami | |
| Street Fighter | October 16, 2026 | Live-action feature film | Paramount Pictures | Street Fighter | Capcom | |
| Cyberpunk: Edgerunners 2 | October 20, 2026 | Anime television series | Netflix | Cyberpunk 2077 | CD Projekt | |
| Witch on the Holy Night (JP) | November 20, 2026 | Anime film | Aniplex, Toho | Witch on the Holy Night | Type-Moon | |
| The Angry Birds Movie 3 | December 23, 2026 | Computer-animated feature film | Paramount Pictures | Angry Birds | Rovio Entertainment | |
