= ScarFall - The Royale Combat =

Indian video game

ScarFall 2.0
- Developer: XSQUADS Tech
- Publisher: XSQUADS Tech
- Directors: Jemish Lakhani; Ashish Dhameliya
- Engine: Unity
- Platforms: Android; iOS
- Release: 25 October 2019
- Genre: Battle royale
- Mode: Multiplayer

ScarFall 2.0 is a free-to-play battle royale game developed by XSQUADS Tech. It was initially released for Android on 25 October 2019 on and released on iOS at a later date.

Depending on the mode selected, players land on abandoned and real life location maps where they need to hunt for the weapons and different supplies. They need to kill all their enemies and survive to become the last man standing. As of February 2022 ScarFall is downloaded more than 10 million times with 2 million monthly active users.

== Gameplay ==
ScarFall features a multiplayer gameplay with last man standing game format. 48 players land on island or other real life location maps where they need to battle for survival. Players can choose to enter the match solo, duo OR squad.

Game starts with a dedicated helicopter assigned to each player which they can fly to any direction and land on their desired location on the map. Once landed, players can search in buildings, caves and other locations for weapons, equipment, vehicles and consumables to fight and help in surviving till the end. Killed players leave death crate behind them which can be looted by anyone. During the match, playable area of the battleground shrinks to a random circle forcing the players to gather at a single point and fight for survival. Players out of the playable area attracts continuous damage ultimately resulting in an elimination from the match.

== Development ==
Game director recalls that he and his friends often went to cybercafés to play games such as Counter-Strike. At that time, He wondered why no such popular game had come out of India and that he, as an IT engineer, should do something. But post-graduation, he focused on his career and started XSQUADS in 2014. Initially XSQUADS Tech Private Limited served as an IT service company. Development of ScarFall started in early 2017 with a team of 4 people and expanded to 15 by October 2020, it took 2 years to convert an idea in to reality and prepare the first working build of the game. Beta version for android was released on Google Play Store in July 2019.

== Reception ==
In July 2020, Indian prime minister Narendra Modi announced Aatma Nirbhar Bharat App Innovation Challenge to identify made in India apps that have potential to grow globally and which are used by many people. 6940 apps were registered within 22 days of announcement ScarFall stood at 2nd place in the gaming category and emerged as first made in India battle royale game. Soon after this, Indian government banned 118 Chinese apps including highly popular TikTok and PUBG mobile saying move is in the interest of India's sovereignty and integrity, defense and security. This caused huge spike in downloads and daily active users of the game as Indian game streamers were looking for locally developed alternatives. To boost prime minister Narendra Modi's vision of Atmanirbhar Bharat and Make In India initiative, Ravi Shankar Prasad, the Minister for Electronics and Information Technology replied to a question from Arani MP Dr M.K. Vishnu Prasad (Congress) in the Lok Sabha, that the Government of India is working towards promoting traditional games of India in online mode as there is a huge market potential for this segment.
