= Mario Royale =

2019 fan-made browser game

- Developer: InfernoPlus
- Publisher: InfernoPlus (self-published)
- Designer: InfernoPlus
- Engine: HTML5
- Platform: Web browser
- Release: June 15, 2019
- Genres: Battle royale, platformer
- Mode: Multiplayer

Mario Royale was an unofficial fan-made battle royale platformer released in June 2019. Developed by YouTuber and modder InfernoPlus, the browser-based game adapted levels from the original Super Mario Bros. for the NES, pitting up to 75 players against each other in a race to the finish. The game quickly gained viral popularity but was forced offline by Nintendo via DMCA takedown notices later that same month.

== Gameplay ==
Mario Royale transposed the core gameplay of Super Mario Bros. into a massively multiplayer battle royale format. Up to 75 players (initially 100, later reduced for performance) simultaneously controlled their own Mario character, racing through modified stages based on Worlds 1, 2, or 3 of the original NES game. The goal was to be one of the first three players to reach the end flagpole/castle.

Players could not directly interact with each other's characters, which appeared as semi-transparent "ghosts". However, they competed for limited resources like Mushrooms, Fire Flowers, and Stars, as grabbing an item removed it from the game world for everyone else. Players could also indirectly affect others by breaking blocks or kicking Koopa shells, which could eliminate opponents. The game supported both keyboard and gamepad controls. The chaotic gameplay, with dozens of Marios jumping simultaneously, was compared by some outlets to Nintendo's official battle royale game Tetris 99.

== Development ==
Mario Royale was created by InfernoPlus, a content creator known for game mods and programming projects. He stated the idea stemmed from the premise that "you can make anything into a battle royale". Development occurred "off and on over a period of several months", although an early report suggested an initial three-week creation period. The game was built using HTML5 with a Java server back-end and released for free via web browser around June 15, 2019. InfernoPlus acknowledged Nintendo's history of taking down fan projects and anticipated that Mario Royale would likely face similar action.

== Reception ==
Upon release, Mario Royale quickly went viral, attracting significant media attention and player interest. Reviewers described the experience as chaotic, addictive, and surprisingly fun, despite the visual clutter of having dozens of identical characters on screen. Within days of launch, it reportedly hosted over a thousand concurrent players even after its initial rebranding.

== Nintendo takedown ==
As anticipated by InfernoPlus and media outlets, Nintendo issued a cease and desist notice regarding Mario Royale around June 21, 2019. In response, InfernoPlus removed the Nintendo-themed assets, replacing Mario with a generic character named "Infringio" and rebranding the game as Infringio Royale and later DMCA Royale. Despite these changes, Nintendo's lawyers reportedly continued to pressure InfernoPlus, stating that the game still infringed due to similarities in level design or core mechanics. InfernoPlus ultimately removed the game entirely from his website.

== Legacy ==
Mario Royale is considered a notable example of applying the battle royale genre to 2D platforming. Its concept preceded Nintendo's own official Super Mario Bros. 35, released in 2020, leading to comparisons between the two games. After the official takedown, various fan communities attempted to resurrect or maintain versions of the game, such as Mario Royale Legacy and MRoyale.
