= Super Mario Bros. 35 =

2020 video game

- The game's icon on the Nintendo Switch Home Menu
- Developer: Arika
- Publisher: Nintendo
- Series: Super Mario
- Platform: Nintendo Switch
- Release: October 1, 2020
- Genres: Platform, battle royale
- Mode: Multiplayer

Super Mario Bros. 35 was a 2020 online multiplayer battle royale platform game developed by Arika and published by Nintendo for the Nintendo Switch. Part of the celebration of the 35th anniversary of Super Mario Bros. (1985) in 2020, it was released as a free downloadable game for members of the Nintendo Switch Online service on October 1, 2020. Its servers were shut down on April 1, 2021, following the official end of the anniversary. The game was similar in concept to Tetris 99 (2019).

The game featured the classic platforming of Super Mario Bros., with the addition of 35 players competing in real-time in a battle royale format. Enemies that the player defeated were sent to other opponents using one of four targeting options. The game featured power-ups that could be obtained by spending collected coins on an "item roulette" and a timer that was extended by defeating enemies and completing levels. Super Mario Bros. 35 received generally positive reviews from critics, who praised the game's unique concept of combining Super Mario Bros. with battle royale gameplay and innovation, while criticizing the game's repetition and simplicity.

== Gameplay ==
The player traversed two-dimensional levels as Mario. Left and right of the player's viewpoint were those of the 34 opponents.

Super Mario Bros. 35 combined run-and-jump platforming with battle royale elements. Thirty-five players each controlled the protagonist Mario, with Luigi being unlockable as a playable character through an Easter egg, and simultaneously traversed through the original set of 32 two-dimensional levels from Super Mario Bros. (1985). These courses contained items, such as coins and power-ups, and enemies that were to be defeated. A player won once all other players were defeated.

Different enemies appeared in certain levels, with different ways of defeating them. Goombas were the most common enemies. Most enemies could be defeated by jumping onto them. Other enemies would drop a projectile when stomped on, such as the Koopa Troopa, which dropped a shell that could be kicked left or right and would ricochet when it comes in contact with an object. Bowser appeared as a boss in the fourth stage of each world. Enemies defeated by the player were sent to other opponents in real-time, appearing in their levels as an additional hindrance. Players could either manually target their opponents or choose from four types of opponents to attack: players who collected the most coins, players who had the least amount of time remaining, players who attacked the player themselves, or random players. Each player would be assigned a timer that started at 35 seconds. They were awarded additional seconds by eliminating enemies, and doing so in rapid succession yielded higher rewards. Letting the timer run out caused the player to lose.

Players could earn a bounty of coins if they knocked out any opponents during a match. If a player collected 20 coins, they would have the option to spend them to spin the "item roulette". This provided the player with one of four items: Super Mushrooms, a mushroom that made Mario larger, gave him the ability to destroy bricks, and gave him an additional hitpoint; Fire Flowers, which gave Mario the ability to shoot bouncing fireballs at enemies; Starmen, which made Mario invincible to enemies for a brief period of time; and POW Blocks, which cleared all enemies on the screen.

At the start of each game, each player could vote for which level to start on. All of the selected levels would be placed in a queue, along with some randomly-chosen levels. Beyond the first level, each player could only vote for levels they had completed. In this pre-game screen, players could also choose to spend up to 50 coins to start with a power-up. In limited-time "Special Battle" events, players could compete in a fixed list of courses and conditions that had a different theme every week. These conditions included starting with coins, a power-up, or more time on the in-game timer. The game also featured a variety of player icons that could be unlocked by meeting various requirements.

== Development and release ==
Super Mario Bros. 35 was developed by Arika, starting before the release of the company's previous game, Tetris 99 (2019), in February 2019. Super Mario Bros. 35 was announced on September 3, 2020, as part of the Super Mario Bros. 35th Anniversary. Following the game's announcement, comparisons were drawn between Super Mario Bros. 35 and Mario Royale, a fan project by InfernoPlus that Nintendo had ordered to be removed one year prior due to copyright infringement. Arika denied cloning the project, stating that the game had been in development before Mario Royale was released. Super Mario Bros. 35 was released on October 1 for free for Nintendo Switch Online members; One week after the release, the game received an update fixing minor bugs and connection stability. To celebrate Halloween, the Special Battle mode only had courses that were underground and night themed from October 20 to November 2, 2020. For the final Special Battle, which ran from March 30 to April 1, all courses were in circulation in order. Some players were accused of hacking to obtain 99,999 coins in a single round to gain an easy supply of power-ups, allowing them to top the leaderboards. Nintendo took action by removing videos published online showing gameplay that was suspected of demonstrating hacking.

Super Mario Bros. 35 was discontinued on April 1, 2021. According to the president of Nintendo of America, Doug Bowser, the 35th-anniversary products were discontinued due to the 35th anniversary being a celebration that was intended to be unique. He considered the concept successful, mentioning how Super Mario 3D All-Stars (2020) sold over 2 million copies in the time frame. He stated how limited-time events were not planned to be used as a marketing strategy for future anniversaries. In June 2021, Hackaday reported that a reverse engineered game server has been implemented.

== Reception ==
Reception

Aggregate scores
Aggregator	Score
Metacritic	75/100
OpenCritic	58% recommend

Review scores
Publication	Score
Destructoid	7/10
GameSpot	7/10
Hardcore Gamer	3.5/5
IGN	7/10
Jeuxvideo.com	13/20
Nintendo Life	8/10
Shacknews	8/10

Super Mario Bros. 35 received "generally favorable" reviews, according to the review aggregator website Metacritic. The website calculated a normalized rating of 75/100 based on 28 reviews. Fellow review aggregator OpenCritic assessed that the game received strong approval, being recommended by 58% of critics. The game remained playable until April 1, and was removed from the Nintendo eShop the day before.

Critics praised the game for its innovation and gameplay, while criticizing its repetition and simplicity. Chris Button from GameSpot noted how the game introduced a new competitive twist to the classic version. Chris Scullion from Nintendo Life stated that it took the classic game and "dials it to 11". Kirstin Swalley from Hardcore Gamer believed the concept was creative and "silly in the best kind of way". Kotaku's Ethan Gach appreciated the concept, calling the late-game a "true gauntlet of death", but felt that the "novelty doesn't last long". Seth Macy of IGN reiterated the latter sentiment, noting that "the repetition of the early levels in Super Mario Bros. 35 definitely makes it feel less super".

Major complaints from critics focused on the repetition of early levels. Players start with only one level available to play and unlock more throughout gameplay, causing many players to be forced to play through the beginning levels because beginners have yet to have more levels unlocked. Zachary Cuevas from iMore stated that the method to unlock new levels was unclear, and Chris Carter from Destructoid wrote that not enough players were choosing different levels before a match, which he believes is due to the lack of an in-game tutorial. Button observed that the repetition creates a lack of pacing and little intensity, but that Special Battle was a good competitive alternative.

Other minor complaints come from the final moments of rounds, where gameplay regularly results in two players going through levels under a test of endurance of the standard platforming. Shacknews's Ozzie Mejia stated that the final two players would "find themselves in a deadlock after playing the same levels over and over", but appreciated how the in-game timer would speed up to fit the moment. Gach thought the ending competition revolved only around the standard platforming but could be challenging for skilled players. Scullion stated the game went back and forth with the final players until someone won. Aubin Gregoire from Jeuxvideo.com commented that the face-to-face battles could last up to five minutes, and the gameplay started to loop.

While critics believed the game had a complex strategy, reviewers found cases where the overwhelming difficulty could be cleared by simply using a fire flower or an invincibility star. Nadia Oxford from USgamer called the game unpredictable, and liked how randomly occurring enemies gave her a new experience from her original experience with the game. Ars Technica's Kyle Orland believed the fire flower was overpowered, and made getting through large groups of enemies too easy. He claimed that certain enemies, such as Bloopers and Buzzy Beetles, would be more of a nuisance, but were uncommon sights.

== See also ==
- List of Nintendo Switch games
- List of battle royale games
- List of platformers
- 2020 in video games
