= BF5 =

BF5 may refer to:

- Ben Folds Five, an American alternative rock band
- Battlefield V, video game by EA DICE
- Hot Wheels Battle Force 5, a Canadian-American CGI series
