= Islands of Nyne =

Islands of Nyne: Battle Royale
- Developer: Define Human Studios
- Publisher: Define Human Studios
- Engine: Unreal Engine 4
- Platforms: Microsoft Windows, Steam
- Release: July 12, 2018 (early access)
- Genre: Battle royale
- Mode: Multiplayer

Islands of Nyne: Battle Royale is a sci-fi-themed first person shooter battle royale video game by American developer Define Human Studios. The game launched in early access on Steam on July 12, 2018. On December 19, 2018, Define Human Studios stopped development of the game and made the game free to play.

== History ==
The game was crowdfunded on Kickstarter in 2016, raising $50,000. Islands of Nyne was released on Steam early access on July 12, 2018; the game reached a peak of over 7,200 concurrent players that month. On December 19, 2018, the game's development was halted due to financial issues, although the game was made free-to-play and servers were kept live for any players to continue playing.
