= InfernoPlus =

YouTuber and video game modder

- Occupation: Programmer

YouTube information
- Channel: InfernoPlus
- Years active: 2009–present
- Genre: Gaming
- Subscribers: 890 thousand
- Views: 136 million
- Last updated: September 2025

InfernoPlus is an American YouTuber and video game modder. He is most well known for his modifications of Dark Souls and Halo games that introduce unusual or surreal gameplay elements. His major projects include Mario Royale and Dark Souls: Remastest.

== Career ==
InfernoPlus has developed modifications for several video games, including entries in the Dark Souls, Halo, and Super Smash Bros. franchises. Many of these modifications introduce surreal elements, described by InfernoPlus as "cursed".

In 2019, InfernoPlus began the development of a battle royale game by modifying Super Mario Bros., telling NPR it followed the idea that "you can make anything into a battle royale". The game was developed off and on over a period of several months, and released as Mario Royale. It was released as a browser game, implementing a modified gameplay that included 75 players racing across a level of Super Mario Bros. while combating one another with the game's power-ups. It attracted approximately one thousand players in its first day and received media attention. Super Mario Bros. owner Nintendo sent InfernoPlus a cease and desist notice on June 21. In response, InfernoPlus removed all Nintendo-owned assets from the game and re-released it as Infringio Royale. New assets were created, and it was re-released again as DMCA Royale. Nintendo continued to request the game's removal, and InfernoPlus removed the game from his website. Despite this, two regularly maintained versions of Mario Royale remain up to this day, both by separate teams: Mario Royale Legacy and Mario Royale Remake. Mario Royale received additional coverage after Nintendo released the similar Super Mario Bros. 35 the following year.

Also in 2019, InfernoPlus developed Cursed Halo, a variant of Halo: Combat Evolved that incorporated strange and silly variations on standard in-game weapons, vehicles, and enemies. He expanded upon the mod with another that produced over-sized in-game vehicles with distorted proportions. Another high-profile mod released by InfernoPlus in 2019 was Skyrim 76, a parody of poorly-received elements in Fallout 76. In 2020, InfernoPlus released Halo Kart, which added Mario Kart gameplay to Halo: Combat Evolved.

In 2021, InfernoPlus developed a mod for Dark Souls that incorporated the gameplay mechanics and assets of Halo, including weapons and maps as well as custom animations to accommodate the changes. Development took place with the support of other modders over a period of three months. Development began when InfernoPlus recreated the Halo map Blood Gulch in Dark Souls to practice custom map development. The mod was built on top of the Dark Souls player versus player mode "Battle of Stoicism", and it was released alternatively under the names Dark Souls: Remastest and Dark Souls: Remastester on Patreon. The modification was announced on InfernoPlus' YouTube channel in the video "Dark Souls Except It's Incredibly Cursed". An Among Us variation was released later that year.

In 2022, InfernoPlus developed Halocraft, a mod for Halo 3 that incorporates elements of Minecraft, including a destructible environment. Also in 2022, InfernoPlus received attention in the gaming community for his development of a humorous strategy in Elden Ring in which he defeated the infamously difficult boss fights by summoning an in-game ally and then having his player character lie on the ground in a fetal position.

== Personal life ==
InfernoPlus lives in the Southern United States and has not publicly revealed his legal name. He considers the production of YouTube videos to be his job.
