= Wildgate =

2025 video game

- Developer: Moonshot Games
- Publisher: Dreamhaven
- Engine: Unreal Engine
- Platforms: PlayStation 5; Windows; Xbox Series X/S
- Release: July 22, 2025
- Genre: First-person shooter
- Mode: Multiplayer

Wildgate is a 2025 first-person shooter video game developed by Moonshot Games and published by Dreamhaven. It was released on July 22, 2025 for PlayStation 5, Windows and Xbox Series X/S.

== Gameplay ==
Wildgate is a sci-fi shooter that sees the player pilot their ship around space searching for loot and encountering other players. The game puts five teams of four players together into matches that last 20−40 minutes, although players are unlikely to meet rival crews at the beginning allowing time to explore dungeons which involves PvE, puzzles and loot. There are different prospectors that players can unlock, and different prospectors excel at different parts of the game, such as repairing, defending or boarding.

The game is played from a first-person perspective. When a player has died, they can be revived by their teammate or respawn on their ship, but when an enemy ship has been destroyed, they are out of the game completely.

== Development and release ==
On March 25, 2026, Dreamhaven and Moonshot Games first announced Wildgate. The game was scheduled to release on PlayStation 5, Windows via Steam and Xbox Series X/S, and a playtest was scheduled from April 10 to 14 across all the platforms.

At Summer Games Fest in June 2025, the release date was confirmed as July 22, 2025, and it was revealed that the game would be cross-platform. An open beta was available for all platforms from June 9 to 16, 2026.

Wildgate was added to Xbox Game Pass on May 6, 2026.

== Reception ==
Reception

Aggregate scores
Aggregator	Score
Metacritic	(PC) 72/100 (PS5) 78/100 (XSXS) 74/100
OpenCritic	55% recommend

Review scores
Publication	Score
Game Informer	8/10
IGN	7/10
PC Gamer (UK)	6/10

Wildgate received "mixed or average" reviews from critics on PC and Xbox Series X/S whilst it received "generally favourable" reviews from critics on PlayStation 5, according to review aggregator site Metacritic. Fellow review aggregator OpenCritic assessed that the game received strong approval, being recommended by 55% of critics.

Game Informer rated the game 8/10 and wrote: "While its pacing can be hit or miss due to its procedural map generation and unpredictable player behavior, Wildgate stands out amidst other PvPvE multiplayer offerings." IGN rated it 7/10 and described how the four-player "mayhem makes for a wild ride." PC Gamer was more critical, rating the game 6/10, and wrote: "Wildgate is a fresh combination of a ship battler and an FPS that is a better concept than it is a game.

Following its launch, the game struggled to find a player base on Steam. Due to the project failing to be successful, layoffs were held at Moonshoot Games in January 2026 with Dreamhaven stating that the current player counts cannot sustain the size of the development team.
