= Michael Morhaime =

American video game developer and entrepreneur

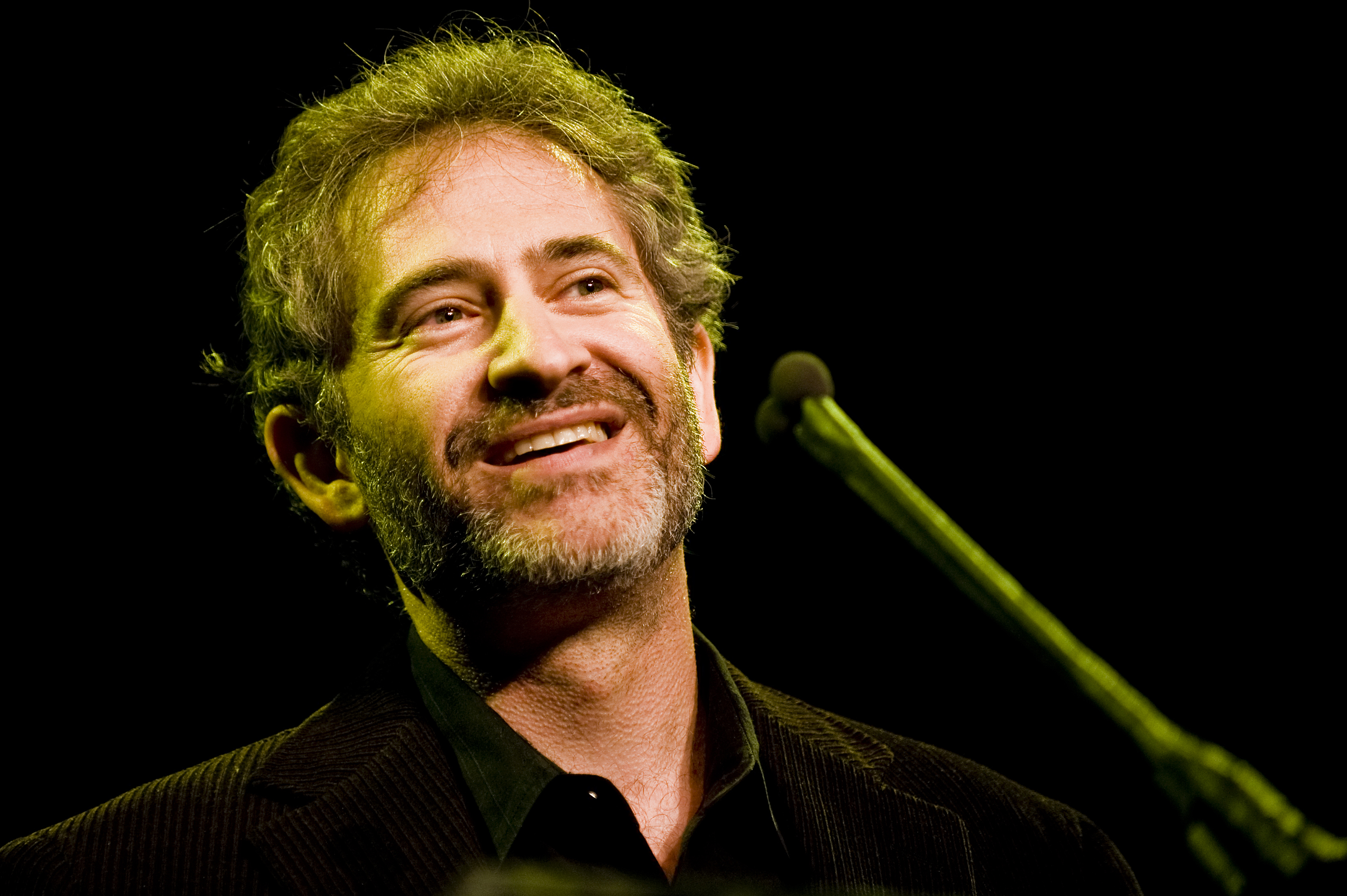
- Morhaime at BlizzCon 2009
- Born: November 3, 1967 (age 59)
- Education: University of California, Los Angeles (BE)
- Occupations: Business executive; video game developer
- Known for: Co-founder and former CEO of Blizzard Entertainment
- Title: Founder and CEO of Dreamhaven
- Spouse: Amy Morhaime (m. 2010)
- Awards: AIAS Hall of Fame Award (2001)

Michael Morhaime (born November 3, 1967) is an American video game developer and entrepreneur. He is the chief executive officer (CEO) and founder of Dreamhaven, located in Irvine, California. Morhaime is best known as the co-founder and the former president of Blizzard Entertainment, a subsidiary of Activision Blizzard, Inc., that was founded in 1991 as Silicon & Synapse. He served on the Vivendi Games executive committee from January 1999, when Blizzard Entertainment, Inc. became a subsidiary of Vivendi Games, until July 2008.

== Early life and education ==
Morhaime was born into a Jewish family and graduated from Granada Hills High School in 1985. He is also an alumnus of Triangle Fraternity and received his bachelor's degree in Electrical Engineering in 1990 from the University of California, Los Angeles (UCLA).

In sixth grade, Morhaime, along with his brother and sister, purchased a video game console called the Bally Professional Arcade, first released in 1978. Morhaime discovered that the console was programmable, and he taught himself how to write simple games on it, building off of example programming code he found in a gaming newsletter.

As an electrical engineering student at UCLA, Morhaime focused more on hardware than on software. "I procrastinated a lot," he admitted. Things changed after he got an internship at a San Jose microchip company. In his internship there, he learned about circuit design, and when he returned to school he was ahead of his computer architecture class. "I used to be the guy that sat in the back," he said, but after his stint in Silicon Valley, he said, "I started sitting up front."

== Career ==
=== Blizzard Entertainment ===
While at UCLA, Morhaime bonded with Allen Adham after realizing they shared the computer password "Joe". Upon graduating, Adham persuaded Morhaime into forgoing his job offer at Western Digital to instead found Silicon & Synapse in February 1991, later renamed Blizzard Entertainment. After hiring their friend and fellow UCLA alumnus, Frank Pearce, they rented a small office in Irvine, California, hoping to benefit from nearby technology companies.

In 1995, Blizzard released Warcraft II: Tides of Darkness, its first number one selling game. "It's probably the game that put Blizzard on the map," Morhaime said. Besides its large number of sales, "it was the first game you could play over the Internet with a good experience," which was a novelty at the time, as well as being a defining selling point for its later titles.

In planning for the release of World of Warcraft (WoW) in late 2004, Morhaime thought that the market for the much larger and more interactive new game, the first in their history to require players to pay a monthly subscription fee, would grow slowly. "We felt it was very likely the fee would be a deterrent for people, and that WoW would not sell as quickly as some of our previous games," he said. All of Blizzard's production and marketing decisions were based on that assumption. To Blizzard's surprise, WoW sold extremely quickly, leaving the underprepared Blizzard unable to keep merchants supplied with the game for a short time. "For the whole first year, we scrambled to keep up with demand," he said. "It probably took years off of our lives." World of Warcraft had approximately 11 million subscribers as of 2010. In 2017, Morhaime earned $12.3 million as the CEO of Blizzard.

On October 3, 2018, Morhaime announced he was stepping down as the company president and CEO, instead becoming an advisor to the company. Morhaime was replaced by J. Allen Brack, the executive producer on World of Warcraft. His advisory role concluded on April 7, 2019.

=== Dreamhaven ===
In 2020, Morhaime founded Dreamhaven, a video game company based in Irvine, California, with two internal studios: Secret Door and Moonshot Games.

In 2025, Dreamhaven published its first internally developed titles: Sunderfolk, a cooperative tactical RPG by Secret Door released on April 23 across PC, PlayStation 5, Xbox Series X|S, and Nintendo Switch, and Wildgate, a crew‑based space‑shooter by Moonshot Games, which launched on July 22 on Steam, PlayStation 5, and Xbox Series X|S.

== Controversy ==
Following Morhaime's departure from Blizzard, in July 2021, the California Civil Rights Department (CRD) (formerly known as the Department of Fair Employment and Housing) filed a lawsuit against Activision Blizzard for sexual harassment and gender-based discrimination in relation to unequal pay and retaliation against female employees in the workplace.

Amidst the news of the lawsuit, former Blizzard employees spoke out about their experiences and the harassment they witnessed within the company. A former manager at the then-competitive gaming brand FXOpen Esports, posted to social media about her experience at a Blizzard holiday party in which a senior creative director kissed her in front of a group of Blizzard employees, including Morhaime who was president and CEO at the time. While he was not named in the lawsuit, and some employees were uncertain whether he was aware of the allegations, multiple employees confirmed that Morhaime was present at some of the company events where the alleged misconduct took place. Morhaime tweeted an apology saying he was “ashamed” regarding the lawsuit several days after the news broke.

== Honors and awards ==
In 2008, Morhaime was inducted into the Academy of Interactive Arts and Sciences' Hall of Fame. On the same year, Morhaime was honored at the 59th Annual Technology & Engineering Emmy Awards for Blizzard's creation of World of Warcraft. Along with Don Daglow of Stormfront Studios and John Carmack of id Software, Morhaime is one of only three designers or producers to accept awards at the Technology & Engineering Emmy Awards and at the Academy of Interactive Arts & Sciences Interactive Achievement Awards.

Morhaime received the national Ernst & Young Entrepreneur of the Year Award in the Technology category in 2012. In 2019, Morhaime was appointed the 2019 Honor Award at the Gamelab Barcelona, in Spain for his success in the gaming industry.

== Multimedia ==
In 2012, Morhaime made a cameo appearance on The Guild, a web series about the lives of a gamers' online experiences with an MMORPG that draws references to World of Warcraft. He is known for his work with the gaming community, but also worked on the 2016 film Warcraft: The Beginning.

== Personal life ==
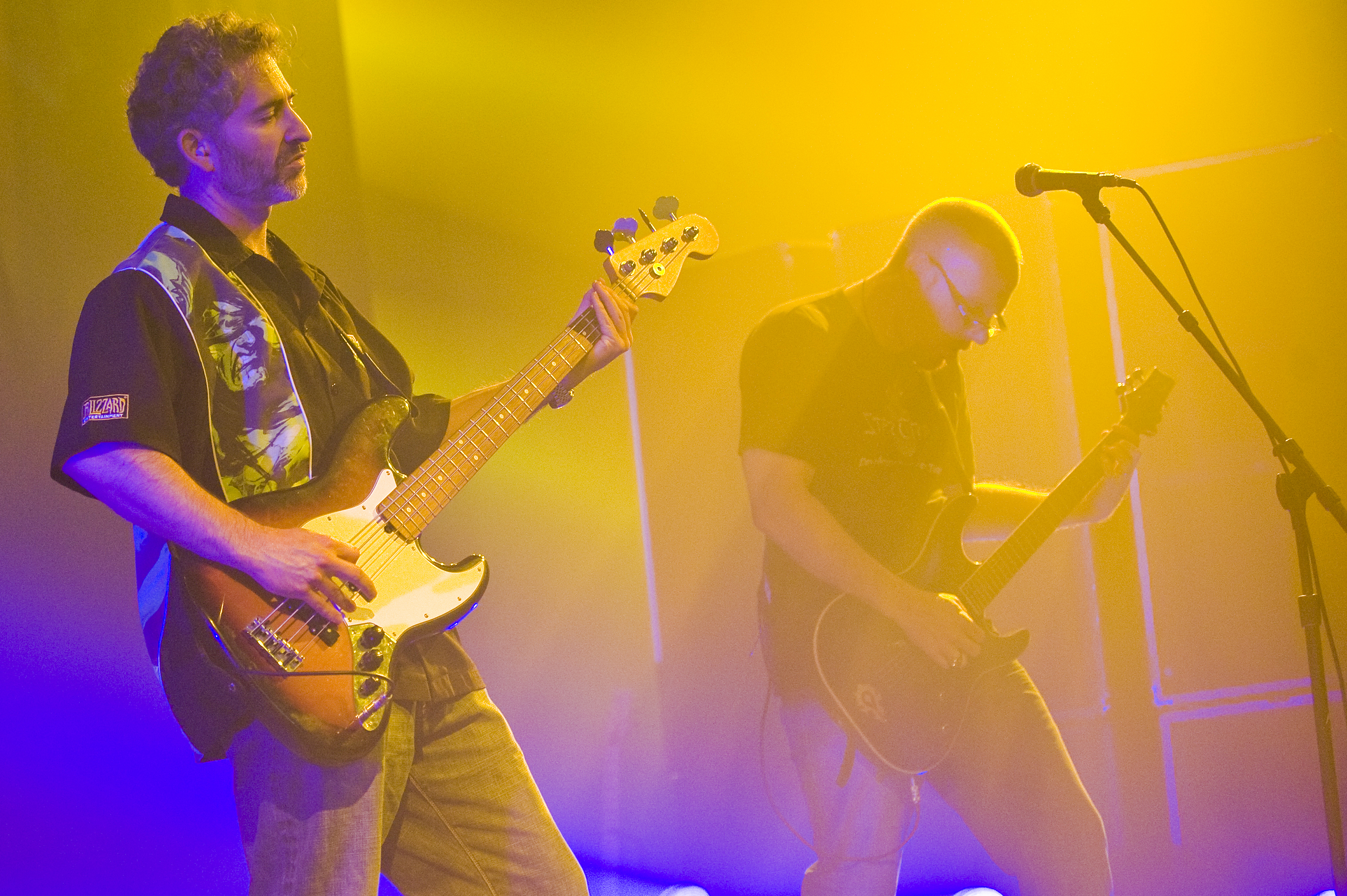
Morhaime (left) playing with ETC at BlizzCon 2009

In 2010, Morhaime married his long-time girlfriend Amy Chen. In 2017, Morhaime bought a mansion in a gated Rancho Mirage community in Riverside County, California for $2.25 million. He is a member of Elite Tauren Chieftain, a metal band formed of and by Blizzard employees, where he plays bass guitar.
