= The Visual Novel Database =

Internet database of visual novels

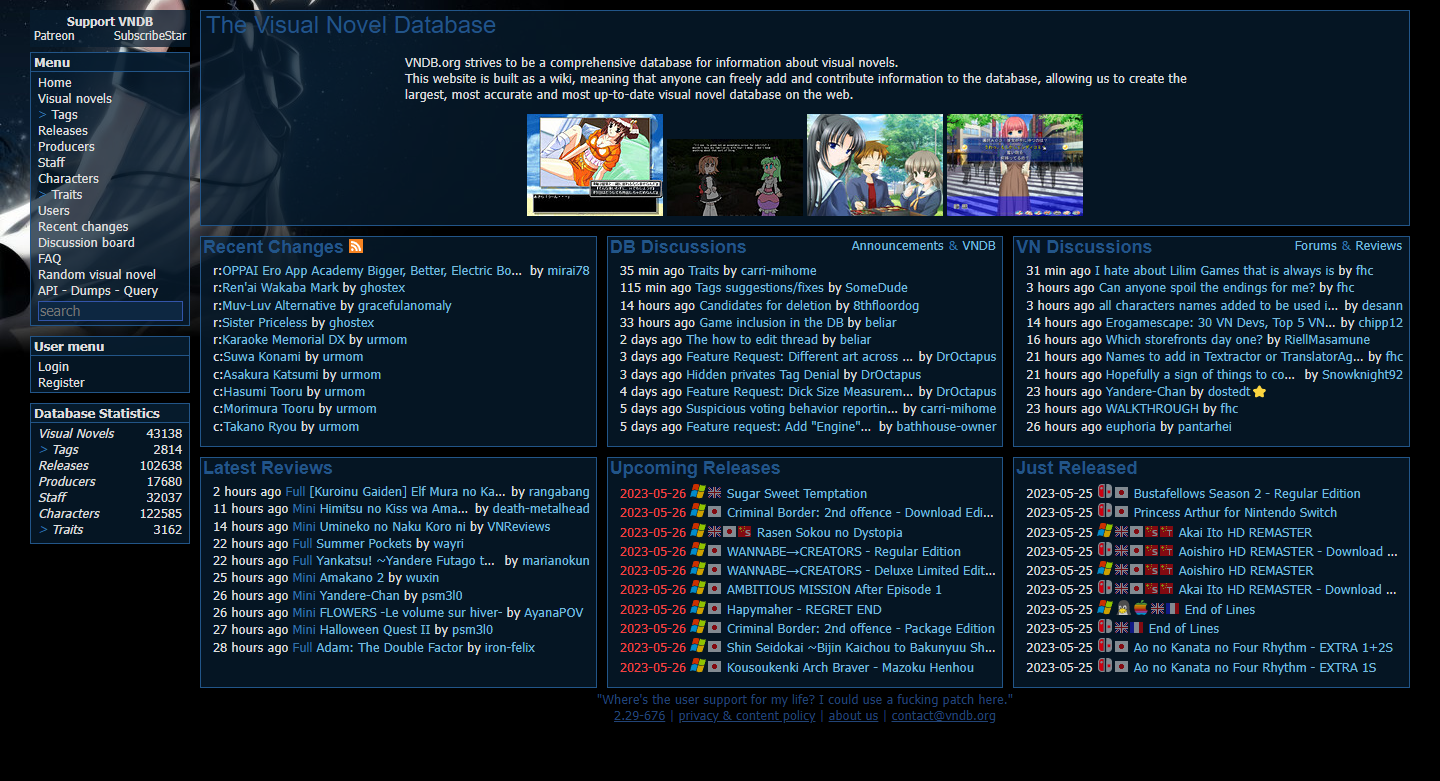
- Homepage of the vndb in May 2023
- Website type: Database; Internet forum Review aggregator
- Available in: English
- Website: vndb.org
- Registration: Optional
- Users: 328,922 (as of December, 2025)
- Launched: September 2007
- Current status: Active

The Visual Novel Database (rendered as vndb or VNDB) is an online database, wiki and Internet forum for visual novels. As of 2019, the VNDB had catalogued a total of 24,000 visual novels, and its forum had reached 14,300 users. According to Electronic Gaming Monthly, VNDB was responsible for helping bring visual novels to an international audience. The site's mascot is Lasty Farson from Angelic Serenade.

== Features ==
=== Database ===
VNDB contains records on approximately 24,000 different visual novels and is updated by registered members of the site. The database records information on characters in these visual novels, as well as their developers, their publishers, and their translators, both professional and amateur. The site can be navigated via browsing categories, filtering by criteria such as language, and viewing random pages.

=== Forum ===
VNDB has a public forum where registered members can converse, with each specific visual novel having a discussion page, as well as a section of the site dedicated to general discussion.

=== Watch list ===
VNDB can be used as a personal watch list, allowing users to make a wishlist, whitelist, or blacklist, and to mark their progress in a game as finished, abandoned, in progress, etc.

=== Ratings and reviews ===
VNDB functions as a review aggregator. The database aggregates ratings given to games by users, and displays score statistics and averages.

Beginning on 31 August 2020, users are now able to write and submit reviews of visual novels, both "mini reviews" and full reviews.

==== Rating scale ====
Ratings on vndb
1	2	3	4	5	6	7	8	9	10
Worst ever	Awful	Bad	Weak	So-so	Decent	Good	Very good	Excellent	Masterpiece

=== API ===
VNDB has a real-time public API for developers who want to interact with the database to, for example, retrieve information or automate tasks related to a personal watch list. The API uses the JSON format.

== History ==
VNDB was created in September 2007 by yorhel (real name Yoran Heling). After playing Ever 17: The Out of Infinity, he noticed the absence of a community dedicated to visual novels, or a place to find more of them. Heling created VNDB over the course of three weeks as a centralised place for people to find and discuss visual novels. One of the oldest games to be documented on the vndb was Lolita Yakyuuken, an eroge released in 1982 for the PC-88, which is also believed to be the first visual novel, however it was later deleted due to a lack of visual novel elements. Within a year, the vndb contained 1,000 visual novels.

Carl Therrien wrote in 2019 that it was "revealing" of the scope fan base for visual novels through their contributions to websites like VNDB. By 2019, fans had documented over 24,000 titles, which has grown to over 50,000 titles by 2024. Academics in Games and Culture have described the database as having "provided essential information", allowing them to "speedrun" video game history.

On March 17, 2026, Heling died. His death was made public on March 21. Hundreds of users gathered to mourn the loss and express gratitude for Heling's contributions to the western visual novel community.
