= The Culling (video game) =

2017 first-person action game

- Developer: Xaviant
- Publisher: Xaviant
- Director: Michael McMain
- Producers: Josh Van Veld; Zain Naqvi
- Designers: Steve Caywood; Tim Lindsey
- Composer: Britt LaReau
- Engine: Unreal Engine 4
- Platforms: Linux; Microsoft Windows; Xbox One
- Release: October 5, 2017
- Genres: Action; battle royale
- Mode: Multiplayer

The Culling is a discontinued first-person action battle royale game developed and published by Xaviant. Following a 2016 early access beta phase, the game was released for Linux, Microsoft Windows, and Xbox One on October 5, 2017.

The Culling was initially popular, but in the wake of the release of two other battle royale games, Player Unknown's Battlegrounds and Fortnite Battle Royale, the player base for The Culling waned, and Xaviant halted future development in December 2017. The company later announced a sequel, The Culling 2, which was released in July 2018, amid the popularity of Fortnite Battle Royale. The game received a negative reception from players, leading Xaviant to pull the sequel from marketplaces, and instead restart work on adapting The Culling as a free-to-play title. The game servers were finally shut down on May 15, 2019, with the game no longer being purchasable on any platform.

== Gameplay ==
Sixteen players are placed in an arena (either a small island or a prison) full of various buildings containing loot. The maps contain caves, bridges, poison gas, explosive barrels, and more. Upon completing various tasks such as surviving for a few minutes, selling items, killing other players, traveling certain distances or interacting with the environment, players receive "F.U.N.C", an in-game currency used to craft or purchase equipment and upgrades each match. When particular perks and air drops are put together, they can provide unique strengths and weaknesses.

== Development ==
The Culling was developed by Xaviant. Having finished Lichdom: Battlemage, they saw the popularity of mods that created a battle royale game atop existing games. The Culling was envisioned to be the first standalone battle royale game on Steam, with the potential to tap into the esports market. The game, as developed, required players that had been killed off to remain in the match, which necessitated the need for Xaviant to provide a robust spectator mode for these players to watch the remaining match play out. Late in the development process, they also recognized this would help the popularity of the game in video game live streaming. Xaviant first announced The Culling in February 2016. After a brief closed alpha period, the game was released into early access on Windows via Steam on March 4, 2016, where it quickly rose to one of the top ten games played on Steam according to Steam Spy.

In March 2017, PlayerUnknown's Battlegrounds was released on Steam in early access. Battlegrounds was another battle royale game which gained popularity quickly over the next year. This led to a significant decline in The Culling's player counts to drop significantly after May 2017. In December 2017, Xaviant announced that development for the game was halting, so that they could work on "a new title". Xaviant left The Culling servers open for players to continue to use.

=== Sequel and reboot ===
In mid-June 2018, Xaviant announced it was preparing to release a sequel, The Culling 2, which it had been working on since stopping development of the first game. At that point in time, Fortnite Battle Royale had been released and surpassed the popularity of Player Unknown's Battlegrounds, and Xaviant's decision to release The Culling 2 in the oversaturated market was questioned. Xaviant's director of operations Josh Van Veld believed that the timing was right, as it had been about two years since The Culling's initial release, making it a fresh title, and that The Culling 2 would be released without an early access period. The announcement came around the same time that leaked images from The Culling 2 had been discovered, with fans of the first game criticizing the look and feel for being too close to Player Unknown's Battlegrounds. Van Veld said the choice to make the game more similar to Battlegrounds was to reflect the trend that the battle royale genre had seen over the last two years. Within The Culling 2, match sizes were increased to 50 players.

The Culling 2 was released on July 10, 2018, for Windows, PlayStation 4, and Xbox One. The game was criticized by players for appearing to be an unfinished title, its release timed to hit the middle of the popularity of battle royale games. Additionally, the release occurred on the same day as the start of a new season within Fortnite: Battle Royale. Steam peak player counts for the game on its first day were around 250 players and within 40 hours the game dropped to a single player.

On July 18, Xaviant decided to pull The Culling 2 from storefronts, close down its servers and refund all purchases. Additionally, Xaviant stated they would instead retake up development and support of the original game towards making it a free-to-play title. The rebooted game, The Culling: Origins, returned The Culling to a state similar to when it was first released on early access in March 2016, including bringing back features that had been removed during its release development, as well as new graphics, features and optimizations featured in the latest build. With its brief service life lasting just eight days, The Culling 2 is the shortest-living online game ever launched.

Xaviant announced in March 2019 that revenue from the rebooted The Culling was not sufficient to cover their ongoing expenses, and were thus planning on closing down the servers in May; offline portions of the game would otherwise remain playable. On March 25, the title was made unavailable for purchase on Steam and de-listed from the Xbox Store.

On May 12, 2020, Xaviant announced that The Culling would return to Xbox One, re-branded as The Culling: Origins, with a "pay-per-match" model. Originally, Xaviant Games announced that players could only play one match per day without a token. However, after considerable backlash, it was announced that this would be changed to ten games per day. By November 13, 2020, the servers had been shut down and Xaviant had few to no employees supporting the game.

== Reception ==
=== The Culling ===
The Culling received generally mixed to positive reviews. John Drawdy of XBLA Fans highly recommended the game saying that it "slowly started to grow on me" and described the game as "Each game brought a new experience showing over and over how you can never know what to expect."

=== The Culling 2 ===
The Culling 2 received generally negative reviews. Steven Petite of IGN gave the game a 2/10 and described it as a "royale mess" and that the game was "nothing more than a weak imitation of PUBG and H1Z1". Jason Stettner of Gamerheadquarters gave it a 0/10 calling it "the worst game on this generation of consoles".

== Bibliography ==
- Couture, Joel (April 13, 2016). "Making a battle royale for players and viewers alike in The Culling". Gamasutra. UBM TechWeb.
- Cosimano, Mike (March 25, 2016). "The Culling will put you on edge". Destructoid. ModernMethod. Archived from the original on May 5, 2016.
