= Supervive =

SUPERVIVE
- Developer: Theorycraft Games
- Publishers: NetEase, Nexon (Korea)
- Producer: Jonathan Belliss
- Platform: Windows
- Release: 24 July 2025
- Genres: Battle royale, hero brawler

Supervive (stylized in all caps) was a free-to-play online multiplayer game, developed by Theorycraft Games. The game is a battle-royale, hero brawler, which has been described as a combination of League of Legends, Apex Legends and Super Smash Bros.

== Development ==
Supervive was first announced in 2023 under the name "Project Loki", and released in open beta in November, 2024. The full game released globally, including in China, on 24 July 2025.

The full release added persistent progression across matches, requiring players to unlock some items outside of matches before being able to use them. This change received overwhelmingly negative feedback, as it was perceived as "unnecessarily grindy".

On 17 December 2025, it was announced that the game would shut down at the end of February 2026.

== Gameplay ==
In Supervive, each player controls a hunter – a characters with unique abilities – from an isometric perspective. Every match has multiple teams scattered on a larger map competing for resources, fighting against the environment and against other players. The winning team is whoever survives until the end of the match. During the match a storm surrounds the playing field, shrinking over time.
