= Rules of Survival =

Online battle royale video game

- Developer: NetEase
- Publisher: NetEase
- Engine: Unity
- Platforms: Microsoft Windows, Android, iOS
- Release: May 31, 2018
- Genre: Battle royale
- Mode: Multiplayer

Rules of Survival was a free-to-play multiplayer online battle royale game developed and published by NetEase Games. It was first released via beta access in November 2017 and released globally on May 31, 2018. By October 2018, the game had reached 230 million players worldwide.

On May 30, 2018, the game was released on Steam. Unlike the free non-Steam version, however, the game was released with a price tag, offering "special gifts" with the purchase. The game was later taken down from Steam by June 13, 2018, and reinstated by June 28, 2018.

On June 27, 2022, Rules of Survival ceased its operations, and players are no longer be able to access its game and its servers.

== Gameplay ==
Ghillie Island game map

Fearless Fiord game map

Rules of Survival follows the standard form of the battle royale genre, where players fight to be the last person (or team) alive. Players can choose to enter the match in different modes: Solo, Duo, Squad (four players), or a Fireteam (five players). In either case, the last person or team left alive wins the match. There are two playable maps in the game: Ghillie Island (120 players, 4.8 km × 4.8 km) and Fearless Fiord (300 players, 8 km × 8 km). There are also different game modes such as the Gold Mode, in which the player can earn gold, or the Diamond Mode in which players may earn diamonds throughout the match. The introduction of the Fearless Fiord game map introduces a new type of match, the Blitzkrieg, in which players will land only on a certain part of the map equipped with a pistol, a backpack and basic armor. Blitzkrieg is meant to make players clash head-on.

The round starts with all players contained in one location on an island. When the countdown finishes, players will parachute from a plane onto an island, with procedurally distributed items such as weapons, armors and medical kits available to be looted, and vehicles to be ridden. Players can also loot killed players for their gear. In third-person mode, players can switch between third-person and first-person perspective. The game also offers first-person mode which forces players into first-person perspective. As the game time progresses, the game's safe zone will gradually reduce in size, where players caught outside the zone will take damage. This increases the chance of encounter, and thus confrontation between players. Random supply drops will also occur during match, providing random items which may otherwise not be able to be found during normal gameplay.

At the completion of each round, players will receive in-game currencies based on survival length, number of players killed by the player and the players level. The currencies can then be used to purchase supply box containing cosmetic items for character or weapon customization.

== Controversy ==
Prior to the release of their mobile versions, PUBG Corporation initiated a legal action in the Northern District Court of California against NetEase Games in January 2018, claiming that their mobile games Rules of Survival and Knives Out infringe PlayerUnknown's Battlegrounds' copyrights. PUBG Corporation's lawsuit asserts that Rules of Survival is "a copyrightable audio-visual work, individually and/or in combination with other elements of Battlegrounds", and identified several elements that appear similar in both games. While many of these elements are common features of a battle royale game, PUBG Corporation claims that there are specific elements from Battlegrounds that copied, such as references to chicken for winning a game or using cookware as weapons. PUBG Corporation also accused NetEase for "cloning [Battlegrounds] at or below cost for the purpose of gaining market share before PUBG releases Battlegrounds for mobile devices." PUBG Corporation seeks both monetary damages and requiring NetEase from further distribution of the games. NetEase, in responding to PUBG Corporation's request to Apple to remove the games, denied that their games violated Battlegrounds' copyrights.

The mobile app of Rules of Survival was banned in India by the government (along with other Chinese apps) on 2 September 2020, the move came amid the 2020 China-India skirmish.

== Closure ==
On April 27, 2022, NetEase Games announced that it would cease operations of the game on June 27, 2022. The shutdown was preceded by the removal of the game from Steam on April 27, 2022. On June 27, 2022, all game operations were terminated, and the game's servers were shut down.
