= Babble Royale =

Video game

- Developer: Everybody House Games
- Publisher: Everybody House Games
- Platforms: Windows; macOS
- Release: December 15, 2021 (early access)
- Genres: Battle royale; puzzle game
- Mode: Multiplayer

Babble Royale is a free-to-play battle royale video game developed by James Lantz and Frank Lantz of Everybody House Games. It was released for Windows and macOS in early access on December 15, 2021, via Steam.

== Gameplay ==
The game's map is built similarly to a Scrabble board with up to 16 players starting out with a single tile. Each player uses their tile to spell out words to move across the board and attack other players. Players can eliminate each other by connecting their words to opponents, and a "hot zone" closes in to shrink the board, dealing damage to players within.
