= Battlefield V =

2018 video game

- Developer: DICE (Note: Additional work by Criterion Games and DICE Los Angeles)
- Publisher: Electronic Arts
- Producers: Andreas Morell; David Sirland; Lars Gustavsson; Ryan McArthur
- Designers: Daniel Berlin; Ross Darvill; Eric Holmes; Fia Tjernberg; Alan Kertz; Colin Clarke
- Programmers: Emanuel Ederyd; Johan Mjönes
- Artists: Andrew Hamilton; Jhony Ljungstedt; Johannes Söderqvist
- Writer: Steven Hall
- Composer: Patrik Andrén Johan Söderqvist
- Series: Battlefield
- Engine: Frostbite 3
- Platforms: PlayStation 4; Windows; Xbox One
- Release: November 20, 2018
- Genres: First-person shooter, battle royale
- Modes: Single-player, multiplayer

Battlefield V is a 2018 first-person shooter game developed by DICE and published by Electronic Arts. The game is the successor to Battlefield 1 (2016) and the sixteenth installment in the Battlefield series. It is based on World War II and is a thematic continuation of its World War I-based precursor Battlefield 1. It was released for PlayStation 4, Windows, and Xbox One in November 2018.

Pre-release reception of Battlefield V was mixed, with the announcement trailer causing significant backlash from some fans of the series. Upon release, the game received generally positive reviews from critics, who praised its gameplay and new multiplayer modes but criticized for its shortage of content at launch and lack of innovation. It sold 7.3 million units by the end of 2018, but was a commercial disappointment for Electronic Arts. In April 2020, it was announced that support for the game would continue until the summer of 2020, when it would receive its last major update.

== Gameplay ==
Battlefield V is focused extensively on party-based features and mechanics, scarcity of resources, and removing "abstractions" from game mechanics to increase realism. There is an expanded focus on player customization through the new Company system, where players can create multiple characters with cosmetic and weapon options. Cosmetic items, and currency used to purchase others, are earned by completing in-game objectives.

The game features several new multiplayer modes, including the "continuous" campaign mode "Firestorm", and "Grand Operations". The Grand Operations mode is an expansion of the "Operations" mode introduced in Battlefield 1, which focuses on matches taking place across multiple stages to simulate a campaign from the war. In Grand Operations, each round will have specific objectives, and performance in each stage will influence the next. If the final day ends with a close margin of victory, the match will culminate with a "Final Stand", with players fighting to the last man standing on a continually shrinking map. Similarly to Battlefield 1, the game features a collection of single-player "war stories" based on aspects of World War II, with voiceovers in each war story's native language. The game also features a cooperative mode not seen since Battlefield 3 called "Combined Arms", where up to four players can undertake missions together and features dynamic missions and objectives so missions cannot be played the same way each time.

The battle royale mode is built around the franchise's "core pillars of destruction, team play, and vehicles". The name "Firestorm" refers to a literal storm of fire that constricts players similar to the popular Battle Royale game mechanic of restricting the play area. Furthermore, this particular game mode was not developed by DICE themselves, but has been outsourced to Criterion Games and features the biggest map created by the franchise to date. It is playable by 64 players, which can be divided into up to 16 squads with a focus on team work.

== Synopsis ==
As in Battlefield 1, the single-player campaign is divided into an introduction followed by episodic War Stories, three of which were available at launch: "Nordlys" takes place from the point-of-view of a Norwegian resistance fighter taking part in the sabotage of the German nuclear program, "Tirailleur" tells the story of a Senegalese Tirailleur during Operation Dragoon, and "Under No Flag" puts the player in the shoes of Billy Bridger, a convicted bank robber and explosives expert conscripted into the Special Boat Service to take part in Operation Albumen. The fourth campaign, "The Last Tiger", was released on December 5, 2018, which depicts the struggles of a German Tiger I tank crew during the Ruhr Pocket in the closing days of the war.

=== My Country Calling ===
The introductory episode of Battlefield V, titled "My Country Calling" or "Prologue", is a tutorial required upon first launching the game. In it, the player learns the basic mechanics of how infantry, tanks, and planes work, as well as setting the tone for future war stories. The prologue begins after Battlefield 1's "Storm of Steel" left off, before cutting to a black screen with white text, commentating on how society was quick to forget the horror of the First World War. The prologue then jumps forward to London in 1939, with Neville Chamberlain's declaration of war on Germany being played on the radio. The narration then begins before the player steps into the shoes of a British paratrooper, during a night raid at Narvik Docks in 1940, during the Battles of Narvik. The player then must defeat several members of the German military before a Tiger I tank appears, and the screen fades to white. The player is then placed into control of tank commander Peter Muller, the main character of the "Last Tiger" war story. In this instance, however, the player is tasked with breaking Allied lines at Tobruk during the Siege of Tobruk, before an artillery strike causes another character change. After the transition, the player is then put in control of a free French sniper, presumed to be one of the same soldiers as the "Tirailleur" war story, around the Kasserine Pass during Battle of Kasserine Pass. After sniping several enemies during an ambush sequence, the player character is then killed when a strafing run hits them. The camera then pans to a Bf 109 fighter pilot with the callsign "Yellow-Seven". This time, the player must shoot down a variety of Bristol Blenheim and Supermarine Spitfire aircraft during the Bombing of Hamburg in World War II, before being shot down themselves. Finally, the player takes the role of a British machine gunner during the Final Defense at Nijmegen railway bridge in 1944, during Operation Market Garden. A V1 flying bomb soon detonates on their position, and the player goes into a last stand before getting murdered in the onslaught of gunfire. Upon completion of all introductory segments, the player is then shown cinematic clips of the war stories, before being treated to the game's title card.

=== Under No Flag ===
In the spring of 1942 during the North African campaign, convicted bank robber William Sidney "Billy" Bridger, the son of another infamous bank robber, Arthur Bridger, volunteers to join the British army in order to be released from prison, and is assigned as an explosives expert to a Special Boat Service team led by George Mason (Craig Fairbrass). Billy and Mason infiltrate occupied North Africa in order to sabotage German airfields. However, things don't go as planned at the first airfield; one of Billy's explosives ("safecracker specials") fails to detonate, much to Mason's anger, forcing Billy to commandeer an anti-aircraft device to destroy the final plane. Mason is wounded, and after an argument with Mason about whose fault it was that Mason could have been taken out, Billy and Mason steal a German's car and drive to the second airfield. However, due to Mason's wounds, Billy is forced to infiltrate the airfield alone. Billy is able to destroy the objectives, but detours to a nearby bunker to collect medical supplies for Mason, and uses the radio there to call HMS Sussex for evacuation. After destroying the base's radar stations, Billy returns to report to Mason. However, Mason is furious when he finds out Billy radioed for help, since it would alert the Germans to their exact location. A massive German force begins to pursue them and they are forced to hide in some ruins. Billy begins to express doubts at his own competence and their chances of survival, as well as grieving over his failure to please his father. Mason confides in Billy that he picked him to volunteer for the unit because his many attempts to rob banks, especially three of one bank, showed him as a "tryer", a person who doesn't easily give up. Inspired, Billy shoots alongside Mason in a last stand while singing along to "It's a Long Way to Tipperary". They manage to hold off the German forces long enough for British reinforcements to arrive, and the Germans are subsequently routed. In the aftermath, Billy and Mason have a newfound respect and understanding of each other as they head off for their next mission.

=== Nordlys ===
In the spring of 1943 during Operation Checkmate, in Rjukan, Norway, a British commando unit is killed attempting to infiltrate a German-occupied facility and Astrid, the Norwegian resistance movement soldier assisting them, is captured. Meanwhile, Astrid's daughter Solveig fights her way into the facility to rescue her. However, Astrid refuses to leave, insisting that the facility must be destroyed first since it is producing heavy water for Germany's nuclear research program. The pair manage to sabotage the facility, but much of the heavy water is evacuated by truck. They attempt to pursue, but are cornered on a bridge by German forces commanded by Leutnant Weber. Entrusting Solveig with the mission to destroy the heavy water, Astrid pushes her off the bridge to prevent her from being captured. Narrowly surviving the fall, Solveig carries on the mission, pursuing the trucks and destroying all of them. Unfortunately, the Germans have already loaded Astrid and some of the heavy water on board a U-boat, and Solveig is unable to board it. Astrid steals a Stielhandgranate and uses it to destroy the U-boat and the heavy water, blowing up herself and Weber in the process. It is left unclear whether Solveig survived the explosion or not.

=== Tirailleur ===
In the late summer of 1944 after the Allied landings at Normandy during Operation Dragoon, Senegalese Tirailleurs soldiers are sent to help liberate France from German occupation. One of these soldiers is the young recruit Deme Cisse, who meets fellow soldier and older brother Idrissa upon arriving in France. However, Deme quickly experiences discrimination from the French army, with the Senegalese being blocked from fighting on the frontlines and instead assigned to perform menial tasks such as filling sandbags. Finally, the Senegalese are allowed to participate in an assault on a heavily fortified German position by moving to destroy a set of anti-aircraft guns defending the area. The Senegalese are ambushed on the way to their objective, but they are able to capture and hold a German strong point. Idrissa is reluctant to proceed further since their commanders are dead and they have no support, but Deme is determined to keep pushing for the anti-aircraft guns in order to win recognition from the French army, and he convinces the rest of the unit to follow him. They are successful in destroying anti-aircraft guns but suffer heavy casualties in the process. In addition, a wounded German soldier boasts they will be surrounded, and destroyed in the inevitable counterattack, and that nobody will know they were even there. A hopeless Idrissa, fearing that he won't come home to his family alive, considers withdrawing, but Deme insists that they do what the Germans won't expect them to: directly attack the German headquarters. They manage to break into the headquarters but are ambushed by a Tiger I tank. Idrissa is mortally wounded after destroying the Tiger, much to Deme's shock. Despite Deme's unit having taken the headquarters, their involvement in the operation is covered up and forgotten. In the present, an elderly Deme recounts his story and declares that no matter what happens, nothing can erase what he and his comrades had done, and that he is proud of it.

=== The Last Tiger ===
In the March 1945 during the Battle of Cologne, veteran Tiger I (number 237) commander Peter Müller and his crew participate in the defense of the Rhine-Ruhr metropolitan region, in the city of Cologne against invading American forces, with orders from OKW that all soldiers must fight to the death. After surviving a series of heavy engagements, the Tiger I is forced to take cover from Allied bombers. At the behest of Schröder, the crew's young and fanatically patriotic gunner, Müller has the unstable loader Hartmann scout the ruins ahead for a passage through. A large American tank column suddenly appears, forcing the crew to leave Hartmann behind. The Tiger receives orders to regroup at a cathedral with other remaining German forces for a final defense; en route, they discover that Hartmann had attempted to desert and was consequently hanged. They reach the cathedral, only to find it abandoned and are quickly surrounded by the United States Army, who demand their surrender. With new orders to defend their position, the crew fights off the enemy before making their way to the bridge, which leads back to German lines. The bridge is suddenly destroyed by a series of explosions, and the Tiger I is disabled. Kertz, the tank's veteran driver, expresses his disillusionment in the German cause and decides to desert despite Müller's pleading; Kertz is then shot and killed by Schröder. As a despondent Müller cradles his friend's corpse, American soldiers arrive and again demand their surrender, but the fanatical Schröder continues to fight. Müller discards his Knight's Cross and raises his arms in surrender, after which an enraged Schröder aims his MP40 at him. The screen cuts to black and a burst of gunfire is heard, leaving Müller's fate ambiguous.

== Development ==
DICE unveiled the first details surrounding Battlefield V on May 23, 2018, with more information to be unveiled during the EA Play press conference near E3 2018 in June. DICE has stated that, unlike Battlefield 1, it does not plan to use paid downloadable content, or "loot boxes" for non-cosmetic items within Battlefield V; new content will be added to the game for all players over time (which, itself, will progress through the different stages of World War II), at no additional charge, morphing into the game's 'Tides of War' and season system, to which there were six over the game's life cycle. The decision to exclude these features was made following the outrage over the loot box system in Star Wars Battlefront II, another EA DICE title. The game was originally set to release on October 19, but was delayed to November 20 to enable the developers to "make some final adjustments to core gameplay". It is one of the first major games to make use of real-time ray tracing and DLSS, with help from Nvidia.

=== Post-launch content ===
Updates for Battlefield V as part of the aforementioned 'Tides of War' and season system added more maps, weapons and game modes to the game. The game ditches the "Premium Pass", which in previous Battlefield titles granted access to many benefits and new, paid expansion packs as they released, for free updates. As of April 23, 2020, which marked the end of active game development, there have been six different major content updates: Overture, Lightning Strikes, Trial by Fire, Defying the Odds, War in the Pacific, and Into the Jungle, all of which saw the addition of new maps focusing on different theatres of World War II, new weapons, vehicles, customization options, custom servers, and a new "War Story" titled "The Last Tiger". Despite Tides of War ending in late April, a final update, simply titled "Summer Update", would be released on June 4, adding new content to the game much in the same way the Tides of War updates did. On March 28, 2024, it was revealed that EA would switch Battlefield V's anti-cheat from FairFight to an in-house solution following a similar move with Battlefield 2042.

Battlefield V has also seen two major digital rereleases throughout its lifetime, the Year 2 Edition and Definitive Edition. Each of these rereleases bundled in many in-game cosmetic options and could be bought separately from the main game or in a bundle. As with other Battlefield games except Battlefield 2042 offering their premium editions on the Steam store as the default version, the Definitive Edition of Battlefield V is the default edition offered on there.

== Reception ==
=== Pre-release ===
The announcement trailer generated a significantly negative reception, as fans of the series criticized the game for a lack of historical accuracy, authenticity and immersiveness. Complaints were made about the use of certain weapons, prosthetics, and body art as being very uncommon in that time period. Some fans were also frustrated with the portrayal of women in the game, specifically with the British woman featured prominently in the trailer as women never participated in frontline combat in the armed forces of the Western Allies.

Many video game journalists argued against such criticisms by pointing out that the roles of women in World War II varied by country (highlighting examples of women soldiers and partisans from France and the Soviet Union) and by pointing out that previous games in the Battlefield series were not intended as a realistic portrayal of war. Some suggested that the backlash was partly due to misogyny, instead of genuine worries over historical accuracy.

In response, the game's executive producer Aleksander Grøndal wrote on Twitter that the team would "always put fun over authentic". DICE's general manager Oskar Gabrielson also responded on Twitter, saying "Player choice and female playable characters are here to stay ... Our commitment as a studio is to do everything we can to create games that are inclusive and diverse. We always set out to push boundaries and deliver unexpected experiences." EA chief creative officer Patrick Söderlund said the developer was uninterested in taking flak for diversifying the gaming space. "We stand up for the cause, because I think those people who don't understand it, well, you have two choices: either accept it or don't buy the game", he said, "I'm fine with either or." Söderlund went on to say that the development team itself pushed for women in Battlefield V. Despite this, in September 2018, prior to release, DICE "dialed back" the character customization options to be more historically accurate.

In August, the Cowen Group, gaming industry analysts, reported that pre-order sales of Battlefield V were "weak", being 85% behind those of Call of Duty: Black Ops 4.

=== Critical reception ===
Reception

Aggregate score
Aggregator	Score
Metacritic	(PC) 81/100 (PS4) 73/100 (XONE) 78/100

Review scores
Publication	Score
Destructoid	8/10
Game Informer	8/10
GameRevolution	2.5/5
GameSpot	8/10
GamesRadar+	3.5/5
IGN	7.5/10
PC Gamer (UK)	79/100
PCGamesN	9/10
PC World	3.5/5
Digital Trends	3/5

Battlefield V received "generally favorable" reviews from critics, while the PS4 version received "mixed or average" reviews, according to review aggregator website Metacritic.

In Game Informer's 8/10 review, they wrote, "Ultimately, Battlefield V will be defined by the success or failure of the pending Combined Arms cooperative mode, Firestorm battle royale mode, and whether or not DICE can continually provide new and engaging content." GamesRadar+ gave the game 3.5/5 stars, praising the gameplay but criticizing the online multiplayer, writing: "Not as drastic a change up as its WW1 predecessor, nor as wild or wondrous, Battlefield 5's deliberative design sidelines its strengths as a simulative sandbox."

=== Sales ===
In November, it was reported that Battlefield V had sold fewer than half the physical units than Battlefield 1 did upon its launch during the same period of time. The game sold 7.3 million units by the end of 2018. On February 5, 2019, EA's CEO Andrew Wilson announced that the game ultimately failed to meet sales expectations, blaming the game's marketing as well as their focus on developing a single-player campaign instead of a battle royale mode, a genre which had gained recent widespread popularity. Wilson also highlighted Battlefield V's long development cycle, and release in a month of strong competition. EA's stock price also faced its worst drop in more than a decade during its third quarter of the fiscal year, declining by around 18 percent, which EA attributed in part to the poor sales of the game.

In Japan, the PlayStation 4 version of Battlefield V sold 110,653 units during its first week of release, placing it at number four on the all format sales chart.

=== Awards ===
Year	Award	Category	Result	Ref.
2018	Game Critics Awards	Best PC Game	Nominated	
2018	Game Critics Awards	Best Action Game	Nominated	
2018	Game Critics Awards	Best Online Multiplayer	Won	
2018	2018 Golden Joystick Awards	Most Wanted Game	Nominated	
2018	Gamers' Choice Awards	Fan Favorite Fall Release	Nominated	
2018	Australian Games Awards	Multiplayer/Online Title of the Year	Nominated	
2018	Australian Games Awards	Shooter of the Year	Nominated	
2019	22nd Annual D.I.C.E. Awards	Outstanding Achievement in Sound Design	Nominated	
2019	22nd Annual D.I.C.E. Awards	Outstanding Technical Achievement	Nominated	
2019	National Academy of Video Game Trade Reviewers Awards	Game, Franchise Action	Nominated	
2019	National Academy of Video Game Trade Reviewers Awards	Use of Sound, Franchise	Nominated	
2019	SXSW Gaming Awards	Excellence in SFX	Nominated	
2019	2019 G.A.N.G. Awards	Audio of the Year	Nominated	
2019	2019 G.A.N.G. Awards	Sound Design of the Year	Nominated	
2019	2019 G.A.N.G. Awards	Best Original Soundtrack Album	Nominated	
2019	2019 G.A.N.G. Awards	Best Cinematic Cutscene Audio	Nominated	
2019	2019 G.A.N.G. Awards	Best Dialogue	Nominated	
2019	2019 G.A.N.G. Awards	Best Original Choral Composition ("Glorifica")	Nominated	
2019	15th British Academy Games Awards	Audio Achievement	Nominated	
2019	15th British Academy Games Awards	Multiplayer	Nominated	
2019	Italian Video Game Awards	People's Choice	Nominated	
