= Dreamhaven =

American video game publisher and developer

- Type: Private
- Industry: Video games
- Founded: September 2020
- Founder: Michael Morhaime; Amy Morhaime
- Headquarters: Irvine, California, US
- Key people: Michael Morhaime
- Subsidiaries: Moonshot Games; Secret Door
- Website: dreamhaven.com

Dreamhaven is an American video game developer and publisher based in Irvine, California. Dreamhaven was founded in 2020 by Blizzard Entertainment co-founder Michael Morhaime, Amy Morhaime, and previous Blizzard employees.

Dreamhaven consists of two internal game development studios, Moonshot Games and Secret Door. The company also publishes games developed by external studios through its publishing and partner-studio operations.

== History ==
On October 3, 2018, Blizzard Entertainment announced that its co-founder, Michael Morhaime, would be stepping down from his role as company president. Morhaime would continue to work with Blizzard as a strategic advisor until April 7, 2019.

Morhaime announced the formation of Dreamhaven, a new video game company based in Irvine, on September 23, 2020. The company was founded by Morhaime, his wife Amy, and a group of his former colleagues. All but one of the initial 27 employees of Dreamhaven had previously worked for Blizzard.

Dreamhaven was announced as both a game development and publishing company. The company would develop its own games through two internal studios, Moonshot Games and Secret Door, each of which was already developing its first game at the time of the announcement. Alongside its internal development efforts, the company would also work with external developers to publish their games.

The company's structure included a central support team for publishing, partnerships, operations and other shared functions. This allowed Dreamhaven to operate as both a home for internal studios and a publishing partner for independent developers.

In March 2025, Dreamhaven held a showcase presented in partnership with The Game Awards, where it announced or updated several projects from its internal studios and partner studios, including Wildgate, Sunderfolk, Lynked: Banner of the Spark and Mechabellum.

== Games ==
=== Publishing and partner studios ===
==== Lynked: Banner of Spark ====
In September 2024, Dreamhaven announced it would partner with indie game studio FuzzyBot Games to publish the studio's first game, Lynked: Banner of Spark. CEO of FuzzyBot Games Tatyana Dyshlova, when asked about why the studio partnered with Dreamhaven, said that Dreamhaven provided "a viable future for the studio and how the terms were presented beyond just this game." Dyshlova also noted that the Dreamhaven team's industry background was part of the studio's decision. Paul Della Bitta, who leads Dreamhaven's publishing efforts, said that the decision to publish Lynked was influenced by the development pace of FuzzyBot Games.

The game was scheduled for an early access release on October 22, 2024 and a full release on May 22, 2025. Dreamhaven later announced that the 1.0 release was available on Windows, PlayStation 5, and Xbox Series X/S on May 22, 2025.

==== Mechabellum ====
In March 2025, Dreamhaven announced a publishing partnership with Chinese development studio Game River to publish its strategy game Mechabellum. Mechabellum had been released in early access in September 2024 under a different publishing arrangement, but the game was later relaunched with Dreamhaven as publisher after Game River exited its original publishing deal.

Amy Morhaime, speaking on behalf of Dreamhaven, said the company became aware of the game after fans of Blizzard's StarCraft reached out to them. Michael Morhaime described the game favorably, saying that Dreamhaven believed people would continue playing it in the future. Game River CEO Wen Youge said that, with Dreamhaven's support, the studio was focused on providing additional content for the game throughout 2025.

=== Moonshot Games ===
==== Wildgate ====
In March 2025, Moonshot Games announced its first video game, Wildgate, during a Dreamhaven showcase in partnership with The Game Awards. The game was described as a crew-based first-person shooter in which players work together aboard spaceships while competing against other crews.

Wildgate combines ship-to-ship combat with first-person boarding and on-foot combat. Players form crews, search for an artifact, gather upgrades and fight rival crews during match-based sessions. Dreamhaven announced an open beta for June 9–16, 2025, followed by release on July 22, 2025 for Windows, PlayStation 5, and Xbox Series X/S.

=== Secret Door ===
==== Sunderfolk ====
In 2024, Secret Door announced development of its first game, Sunderfolk. The game has been described as a "couch co-op tactical RPG you play with a phone."

Sunderfolk is a turn-based tactical role-playing game designed around shared-screen play, with players using a companion phone app as a controller. The game supports up to four players and includes online play through screen sharing in addition to its local cooperative focus. Dreamhaven announced April 23, 2025 as the official release date for Sunderfolk during its 2025 showcase. The game was released for Windows, Nintendo Switch, PlayStation 5, and Xbox Series X/S.
