= Last one standing (video games) =

Multiplayer deathmatch gameplay mode

Last one standing (LOS), last man standing (LMS), or last team standing (LTS) is a multiplayer deathmatch gameplay mode featured in certain computer and video games, particularly, but not exclusively, first-person shooters, and is also the basis of battle royale games. The aim of a player in a last-one-standing match is to eliminate their opponents and remain the sole survivor.

Each player is assigned a specific number of lives per match (or just one in the case of permadeath). An eliminated player loses a life and respawns. Once a player loses all lives, the player loses the match and remains as an invisible spectator until there is a winner. A similar gameplay mode is Deathmatch, except that in the latter the winner is the player that eliminates the most rivals.

Several different variations of the last-one-standing mode exist, with the most common being team LOS. The rules are the same as the standard LOS, the winning team being the one that eliminates all members of the opposing teams while keeping at least one of its members alive. In some games, the player is allowed to buy or pick up items before spawning, while other titles have all players spawn with full weapons and ammo and there are no powerups available on the map.

The first last-one-standing video game with a shrinking play zone was the 1983 action game Bomberman.

== See also ==
- Battle royale game
