= Battle royale game =

Video game genre with last-man-standing gameplay

A battle royale game is an online multiplayer video game genre that blends last-man-standing gameplay with the survival, exploration, and scavenging elements of a survival game. Battle royale games involve dozens to hundreds of players, who start with minimal equipment and then must eliminate all other opponents while avoiding being trapped outside a shrinking "safe area", with the winner being the last player or team alive.

The name for the genre is taken from the 2000 Japanese film Battle Royale, itself based on the novel of the same name, which presents a similar theme of a last-man-standing competition in a shrinking play zone. The genre's origins arose from mods for large-scale online survival games like Minecraft and Arma 2 in the early 2010s. By the end of the decade, the genre became a cultural phenomenon, with standalone games such as PUBG: Battlegrounds (2017), Fortnite Battle Royale (2017), Apex Legends (2019) and Call of Duty: Warzone (2020) each having received tens of millions of players within months of their releases.

== Concept ==
Battle royale games are played between many individual players, pairs of players, or a number of small squads (typically of 3-5 players). In each match, the goal is to be the last player or team standing by eliminating all other opponents. A match starts by placing the player-characters into a large map space, typically by having all players skydive from a large aircraft within a brief time limit. The map may have random distribution or allow players to have some control of where they start. All players start with minimal equipment, giving no player an implicit advantage at the onset. Equipment, usually used for combat, survival or transport is randomly scattered around the map, often at landmarks on the map, such as within buildings in ghost towns. Players need to search the map for these items while avoiding being killed by other players, who often cannot be visually marked or distinguishable either on-screen or on the map. Equipment from eliminated players can usually be looted as well. These games often include some mechanic to push opponents closer together as the game progresses, usually taking the form of a gradually shrinking safe zone, with players outside the zone facing elimination.

Typically, battle royale contestants are only given one life, and any players who die are rarely allowed to respawn. Games with team support may allow players to enter a temporary near-death state once health is depleted, giving allies the opportunity to revive them before they are eliminated. The match is over when only one player or team remains, and the game typically provides some type of reward, such as in-game currency used for cosmetic items, to all players based on how long they survived. The random nature of starting point, item placement, and safe area reduction enables the battle royale genre to challenge players to think and react quickly and improve strategies throughout the match as to be the last man/team standing. In addition to standalone games, the battle royale concept may also be present as part of one of many game modes within a larger game, or may be applied as a user-created mod created for another game.

== History ==
Formulative elements of the battle royale genre had existed prior to the 2010s. Gameplay modes featuring last man standing rules have been a frequent staple of multiplayer action games as early as 1990's Bomberman. The elements of scavenging and surviving on a large open-world map were popularized through survival games.

The 2000 Japanese film Battle Royale, along with Koushun Takami's earlier 1999 novel of the same name and its 2000 manga adaptation, set out the basic rules of the genre, including players being forced to kill each other until there is a single survivor, the gameplay taking place on a shrinking map, and the need to scavenge for weapons and items. It soon inspired a wave of battle royale-themed Japanese manga and anime, such as Gantz (2000), Future Diary (2006), and Btooom! (2009). Fictional battle royale video games were depicted in Btooom!, and in the Phantom Bullet (Gun Gale Online) arc of the light novel series Sword Art Online (2010 in print) as the "Bullet of Bullets" tournament.

Initial attempts at adapting the Battle Royale formula into video games came in the form of Japanese visual novel games that focused on storytelling and puzzle-solving, such as Higurashi: When They Cry (2002), Zero Escape (2009) and Danganronpa (2010). However, these visual novel games are distinct from the genre which became known as battle royale games, which emerged when Western developers later adapted the Battle Royale formula into a shooter game format.

=== Early mods and games (2012–2016) ===
Shortly after the release of the 2012 film The Hunger Games, which had a similar premise to Battle Royale, a server plug-in named Hunger Games (later changed to Survival Games) was developed for Minecraft. Survival Games takes inspiration from the film, initially placing players at the center of the map near a set of equipment chests. When the game commences, players can compete over the central resources or spread out to find items stored in chests scattered around the play area. Players killed are eliminated and the last surviving player wins the match.

In DayZ, a mod for Arma 2 released in August 2012, players struggle alongside or against each other to obtain basic necessities to continue living in a persistent sandbox filled with various dangers. The mod was designed to include player versus player encounters, but generally these events were infrequent due to the size of the game's map and the persistence of the game world. This led to the development of game mods that sacrificed DayZ open-endedness in favor of focusing on more frequent hostile interactions between players to determine an eventual winner.

The most influential battle royale mod was created by Brendan Greene, known by his online alias "PlayerUnknown", whose Battle Royale mod of DayZ first released in 2013. This mod was directly inspired by Battle Royale, and introduces concepts from the film such as a shrinking play zone that forces players into closer proximity as the game progresses. In contrast to Hunger Games-inspired mods, Greene's mod included weapons that were randomly scattered around the map. Greene recreated this mod for Arma 3 in 2014, and continued to use his format as a consultant for H1Z1: King of the Kill. He later became the creative developer at Bluehole of a standalone game representing his vision of the battle royale genre, which would later be released as PUBG: Battlegrounds.

Games from other developers took inspiration from highly played battle royale-style mods, as well as the popularity of The Hunger Games film series. Ark: Survival Evolved by Studio Wildcard introduced its "Survival of the Fittest" mode in July 2015, which was geared to be used for esports tournaments. The mode was temporarily broken off as its own free-to-play game during 2016 before the developers opted to merge it back into the main game for ease of the overall game's maintenance.

In 2016, a battle royale mobile game based on the 2009 manga Btooom, Btooom Online, was developed and released in Japan. Despite some initial success on the Japanese mobile charts, Btooom Online was ultimately a commercial failure in Japan.

=== Formation of standalone games (2017–2018) ===
While formative elements of the battle royale genre had been established before 2017, the genre grew from two principal titles through 2017 and 2018: PUBG: Battlegrounds and Fortnite Battle Royale. Both games drew tens of millions of players in short periods of time, making them commercial successes and leading to future growth in the genre. H1Z1: King of the Kill, which predated those two titles, had regularly been one of the most played games on the computer gaming platform Steam by the start of 2017, but was not able to maintain its player base.

While PUBG: Battlegrounds was not the first battle royale game, its release to early access in March 2017 drew a great deal of attention, selling over twenty million copies by the end of the year, and is considered the defining game of the genre. In September 2017, the game broke the previous record for highest number of concurrent players on Steam, with over 1.3 million users playing the game simultaneously. Battlegrounds' explosive growth and its establishment of the battle royale genre was considered one of the top trends in the video game industry in 2017. Numerous games that copied the fundamental gameplay of Battlegrounds appeared in China shortly after Battlegrounds' release.

Epic Games had released Fortnite, a cooperative survival game, into early access near the release of Battlegrounds. Epic saw the potential to create their own battle royale mode, and by September 2017 they had released the free-to-play Fortnite Battle Royale which combined some of the survival elements and mechanics from the main Fortnite game with the battle royale gameplay concept. The game saw similar player counts as Battlegrounds, with twenty million unique players reported by Epic Games by November 2017. Bluehole expressed concern at this move, not due to Fortnite Battle Royale being a clone of Battlegrounds but because they had been working with Epic Games for technical support of the Unreal Engine in Battlegrounds, and thus were worried that Fortnite may be able to include planned features to their battle royale mode before Bluehole could release them in Battlegrounds. Battlegrounds' developer, PUBG Corporation, filed a lawsuit against Epic Games in South Korea in January 2018 claiming Fortnite Battle Royale infringements on Battlegrounds' copyrights. Market observers predicted that there would be little likelihood of Bluehole winning the case, as it would be difficult to establish the originality of PUBG in court due to itself being derived from Battle Royale. By the end of June 2018, the lawsuit had been closed by PUBG for undisclosed reasons.

In 2018, Fortnite Battle Royale rivaled Battlegrounds in player numbers and surpassed it in revenue, which was attributed to its free-to-play business model and cross-platform support as well as its accessibility to casual players. Battlegrounds creator Brendan Greene credited it with further growing the battle royale genre. Its mainstream publicity further increased following a stream by Tyler "Ninja" Blevins with Drake, JuJu Smith-Schuster and Travis Scott, which set a Twitch record for concurrent viewership. The game accumulated a total player base of 45 million in January and 3.4 million concurrent players in February. Polygon labeled it "the biggest game of 2018" and "a genuine cultural phenomenon", with "everyone from NFL players to famous actors" playing it, including Red Sox player Xander Bogaerts and Bayern Munich's youth team borrowing celebrations from the game. In Asia, however, PUBG remained the most popular battle royale game.

Other popular battle royale games released in 2017 include two NetEase titles, Rules of Survival and the mobile game Knives Out, as well as the Garena mobile game Free Fire, which had over 150 Million daily active players as of 2021. All of these games had received hundreds of millions of downloads, mostly in Asia, by 2018.

=== Mainstream popularity (2018–present) ===
With the success of Battlegrounds and Fortnite, the battle royale genre expanded greatly. Major publishers, including Electronic Arts Activision, and Ubisoft acknowledged the impact of the growing genre on their future plans and on the industry as a whole. Activision's Call of Duty series included a battle royale mode titled Blackout in its 2018 installment, Call of Duty: Black Ops 4, as did EA's Battlefield V. Other established games added battle royale-inspired game modes in updates, such as Grand Theft Auto Online, Paladins, Dota 2, Battlerite, and Counter-Strike: Global Offensive. In February 2019, EA released the free-to-play Apex Legends, which exceeded 50 million player accounts within a month. The second main battle royale installment in the Call of Duty franchise, titled Call of Duty: Warzone, was released in March 2020 as a part of the Call of Duty: Modern Warfare video game but did not require purchase of it. The game reached more than 50 million players in its first month of release.

Battle royale mechanics have also been used in games from genres not normally associated with shooter games. In the 2019 Nintendo Switch game Tetris 99, 99 players simultaneously compete in a game of Tetris. Players can direct "attacks" on other players for each line they complete and attempt to remain the last player standing. Tetris 99 served as a template for the Switch games Super Mario Bros. 35, Pac-Man 99, and F-Zero 99. Blizzard Entertainment added a battle royale-inspired "Battlegrounds" mode to its digital card game Hearthstone, where eight players vie to win over the others through several rounds of drafting new cards and fighting in one-on-one events. The racing game Forza Horizon 4 from Playground Games added a battle royale mode called "The Eliminator" where players all start with the same car, but can gain upgrades by beating other players and discovering "drops" around the map; Microsoft stated in 2021 that it was the most popular multiplayer mode in the game. Babble Royale is a game developed by Frank Lantz that uses Scrabble as a basis for a word-based battle royale game.

As of December 2019, dozens of battle royale games had debuted, but as with the multiplayer online battle arena genre, only two or three titles maintained widespread popularity at the same time. Other games and battle royale modes had briefly become popular before their concurrent player count dropped and players returned to Fortnite or Battlegrounds; Apex Legends was the year's only new successful battle royale game. In contrast to other multiplayer-only games, the large number of players typically involved in a single battle royale match generally requires a substantial concurrent player base in order to fill matchmaking lobbies in a reasonable amount of time. Xaviant Studios' The Culling was released in early access in 2016 and designed to be a streaming-friendly battle royale mode for 16 players. However, following the release of Battlegrounds, The Culling lost much of its player base, and Xaviant announced they were ending further development on it only a few months after releasing the full version of the game. Radical Heights by Boss Key Productions was launched in April 2018 but within two weeks had lost 80% of its player base. SOS, a battle royale game released by Outpost Games in December 2017, had its player counts drop into the double-digits by May 2018, leading Outpost to announce the game's closure by November 2018. While several major battle royale announcements occurred at E3 in 2018, only Fallout 76's battle royale mode appeared at the trade show in 2019.

In October 2017, the Chinese government stated through its Audio and Video and Numeral Publishing Association that it will discourage its citizens from playing battle royale games as they considered the games too violent, which "deviates from the values of socialism and is deemed harmful to young consumers", as translated by Bloomberg. Western Gaming publications speculated that the government's stance would make it difficult or impossible to publish battle royale within the country. In November 2017, PUBG Corporation announced a partnership with Tencent to publish Battlegrounds in China, making some changes in the game to "make sure they accord with socialist core values, Chinese traditional culture and moral rules" to satisfy Chinese regulations and censors. However, during mid-2018, the Chinese government revamped how it reviewed and classified games that were to be published in China, and by December 2018, after the formation of the new Online Ethics Review Committee, several battle royale titles including Fortnite and PUBG were listed as prohibited. While PUBG Corporation was working with Tencent on a Chinese release, many clones of Battlegrounds were released in China.

== Impact ==
The rapid growth and success of the battle royale genre has been attributed to several factors, including the way all players start in the same vulnerable state and eliminating any intrinsic advantage for players, and being well-suited for being a spectator esport. Other factors including specific games' business models, such as Fortnite Battle Royale being free and available across computers, consoles, and mobile devices. A University of Utah professor also considers that battle royale games realize elements of Maslow's Hierarchy of Needs, a scheme to describe human motivation, more-so than video games have in the past. While the lowest tiers of Maslow's hierarchy, physiological and safety, are met by the survival elements of battle royales, the love/belonging and esteem tiers are a result of the battle royale being necessarily a social and competitive game, and the final tier of self-actualization comes from becoming skilled in the game to win frequently.

Business Insider projected that battle royale games would bring in over $2 billion during 2018 alone, and would generate a total of $20 billion by the end of 2019. SuperData Research reported that, in 2018, the three top-grossing battle royale games (Fortnite, PUBG and Call of Duty: Black Ops 4) generated nearly $4 billion in combined digital revenue that year. SuperData Research reported that the top four highest-grossing battle royale games of 2020 (PUBG Mobile, Garena Free Fire, Call of Duty: Warzone and Fortnite) generated more than $7 billion worldwide in combined digital revenue that year. Fortnite grossed over $9 billion worldwide by 2019, while PUBG Mobile grossed over $8 billion by early 2022.

Sensor Tower reported that 2018's top three most-downloaded mobile battle royale games (PUBG Mobile, Garena Free Fire and Fortnite) received over 500 million downloads combined that year. As of 2020, the most-played battle royale games include PUBG Mobile with 600 million players, Fortnite with 350 million players, NetEase's mobile game Knives Out with over 250 million players, Rules of Survival with 230 million players, and Garena Free Fire with over 180 million players.

Turtle Beach Corporation, a manufacturer of headphones and microphones for gaming, reported an increase of over 200% in net revenues for the second quarter of 2018 over the same quarter in 2017, which they attributed to the popularity of the battle royale genre.

In a 2022 study conducted on Japanese students who regularly play online games, battle royale gameplay was shown to have statistically significant correlations with gaming addiction and a sense of underachievement. The study also suggested that the battle royale genre requires more attention than other esports genres, particularly in terms of its link with aggressive feelings.

== See also ==
- List of battle royale games
