= EB Games Expo =

Australian video game convention

- Status: Defunct
- Venue: Gold Coast Convention and Exhibition Centre (2011,2017) Sydney Showground (2012-2016) Melbourne Convention and Exhibition Centre (2018)
- Locations: Gold Coast, Sydney, Melbourne
- Country: Australia
- Inaugurated: 2011
- Most recent: 2018
- Organiser: EB Games Australia
- Website: www.ebexpo.com.au

EB Games Expo, commonly known as EB Expo or EBX, was a video game trade fair and convention held annually from 2011 to 2018 in Australia. It was organised by EB Games Australia. It was used by many video game developers to show off their upcoming games and game-related hardware. Unlike E3, it allowed members of the general public to attend. The most recent show was held in 2018 as part of the Penny Arcade Expo.

== 2011 ==
EB Games Expo 2011 was held at the Gold Coast Convention and Exhibition Centre from 15 to 16 October; it was the first time the event was open to the public. The expo was attended by 14,278 people and 26 exhibitors.

=== Exhibitors ===
2K Games: The Darkness II; MLB 2K11; NBA 2K11; Top Spin 4; Activision: Call ofElite; Call of Duty: Modern Warfare 3; Goldeneye 007: Reloaded; Prototype 2; Skylanders: Spyro's Adventure; Spider-Man: Edge of Time; Bethesda Softworks: The Elder Scrolls V: Skyrim; Rage; Bluemouth Interactive Capcom: Resident Evil: Operation Raccoon City; Street Fighter X Tekken; Codemasters: F1 2011; Disney Interactive Studios: Disney Universe; Electronic Arts: Battlefield 3; FIFA 12; Mass Effect 3; Need for Speed: The Run; Konami: Metal Gear Solid: Snake Eater 3D; Pro Evolution Soccer 2012; Namco Bandai: Ace Combat Assault Horizon; Dragon Ball Z: Ultimate Tenkaichi; Soul Calibur V	Microsoft: Dance Central 2; Forza Motorsport 4; Halo: Combat Evolved Anniversary; Kinect Disneyland Adventures; Kinect Sports: Season Two; Kinect Star Wars; Nintendo: Kirby's Adventure Wii; The Legend of Zelda: Ocarina of Time 3D; The Legend of Zelda: Skyward Sword; Mario Kart 7; Mystery Case Files: The Malgrave Incident; Star Fox 64 3D; Super Mario 3D Land; Parrot AR.Drone Plantronics Red Bull Mobile Razer SEGA: Mario & Sonic at the London 2012 Olympic Games; Sonic Generations; Sony: DanceStar Party; Eyepet & Friends; Journey; Little Deviants; Medieval Moves; Move Fitness; PlayStation Vita; Ratchet & Clank: All 4 One; Start The Party! Save The World!; Uncharted 3; Square Enix: Final Fantasy XIII-2	THQ: Marvel Super Hero Squad: Comic Combat; Saints Row: The Third; uDraw; UFC Undisputed 3; WWE '12; Turtle Beach Ubisoft: The Adventures of Tintin; Assassin's Creed: Revelations; The Black Eyed Peas Experience; Just Dance 3; Motionsports Adrenaline; Raving Rabbids: Alive & Kicking; Rayman Origins; Your Shape Fitness Evolved 2012; Warner Bros Games: Batman: Arkham City; Happy Feet Two: The Video Game; LEGO Harry Potter: Years 5-7; Lollipop Chainsaw; The Lord of the Rings: War in the North; Sesame Street: Once Upon a Monster

== 2012 ==
EB Games Expo 2012 was held at the Sydney Showground from 5–7 October, and was the first time it was held at the venue. The expo was attended by 30,745 people and 32 exhibitors.

=== Exhibitors ===
2K Games: Borderlands 2; NBA 2K13; XCOM: Enemy Unknown; Activision: Call of Duty: Black Ops II; Skylanders: Giants; Alienware Astro Headsets Bluemouth Interactive Capcom: DmC: Devil May Cry; Lost Planet 3; Resident Evil 6; Disney Interactive Studios: Epic Mickey 2: The Power of Two; Electronic Arts: FIFA 13; Medal of Honor: Warfighter; Need for Speed: Most Wanted; Home Entertainment Suppliers: Tritton Headsets; Hot Stuff Ikon Collectables inComm: Roblox; Konami: Castlevania: Lords of Shadow 2; Metal Gear Rising: Revengeance; Pro Evolution Soccer 2013; Silent Hill: Book of Memories; Logitech Mega Bloks Microsoft: Dance Central 3; Fable: The Journey; Forza Horizon; Halo 4; Kinect Nat Geo TV; Kinect Sesame Street TV; Nike+ Kinect Training; Mindscape	Namco Bandai: Dragon Ball Z for Kinect; F1 Race Stars; Tekken Tag Tournament 2; Nintendo: Assassin's Creed III; Batman: Arkham City; Darksiders II; Just Dance 4; New Super Mario Bros. U; Nintendo Land; Pokémon Black and White 2; Rayman Legends; Scribblenauts Unlimited; Sing Party; Wii U; ZombiU; Parrot AR.Drone Performance Designed Products Plantronics Gamecom QV Software: Afterglow; Dead Island; Guild Wars 2; Sniper: Ghost Warrior 2; Razer Sega: Aliens: Colonial Marines; Sonic & All-Stars Racing Transformed; Sennheiser Sony: Dancestar Party Hits; God of War: Ascension; LittleBigPlanet Karting; LittleBigPlanet PS Vita; PlayStation All-Stars Battle Royale; Ratchet & Clank: Q-Force; Sports Champions 2; Wonderbook: Book of Spells; Square Enix: Hitman: Absolution; Tomb Raider; Turtle Beach	THQ: Company of Heroes 2; Lost Planet 3; Resident Evil 6; South Park: The Stick of Truth; WWE '13; TRITTON Tt eSPORTS Tuff Kat Turtle Beach Ubisoft: Assassin's Creed III; Assassin's Creed III: Liberation; Far Cry 3; The Hip Hop Dance Experience; Just Dance 4; Marvel Avengers: Battle for Earth; Rayman Legends; Rocksmith; Tom Clancy's Ghost Recon: Future Soldier; Tom Clancy's Splinter Cell: Blacklist; Zombi U; Warner Brothers Games: Injustice: Gods Among Us; Lego Lord of the Rings; Scribblenauts Unlimited

== 2013 ==
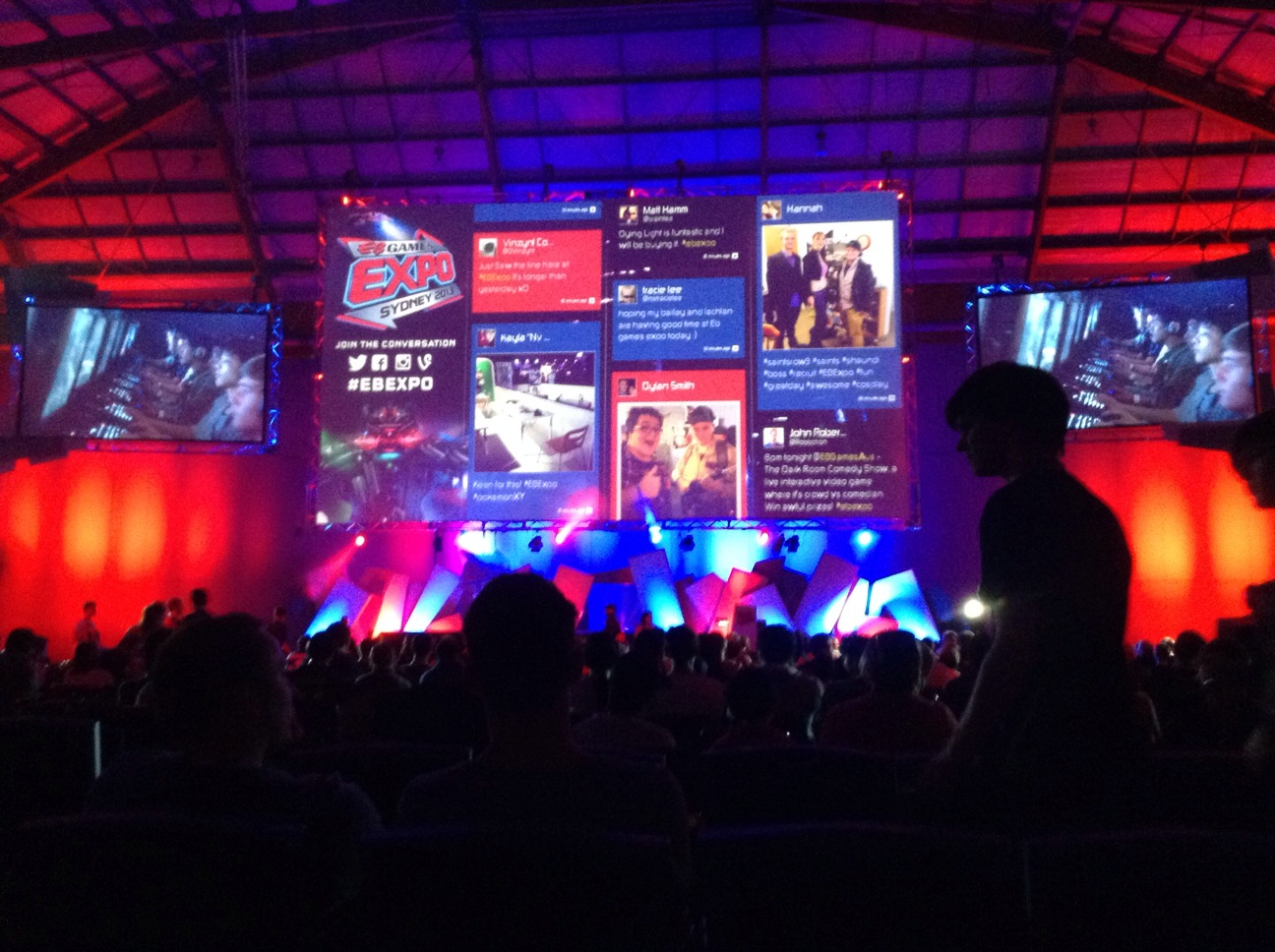
The "EB Arena", the presentation stage, pictured during the 2013 EB Games Expo

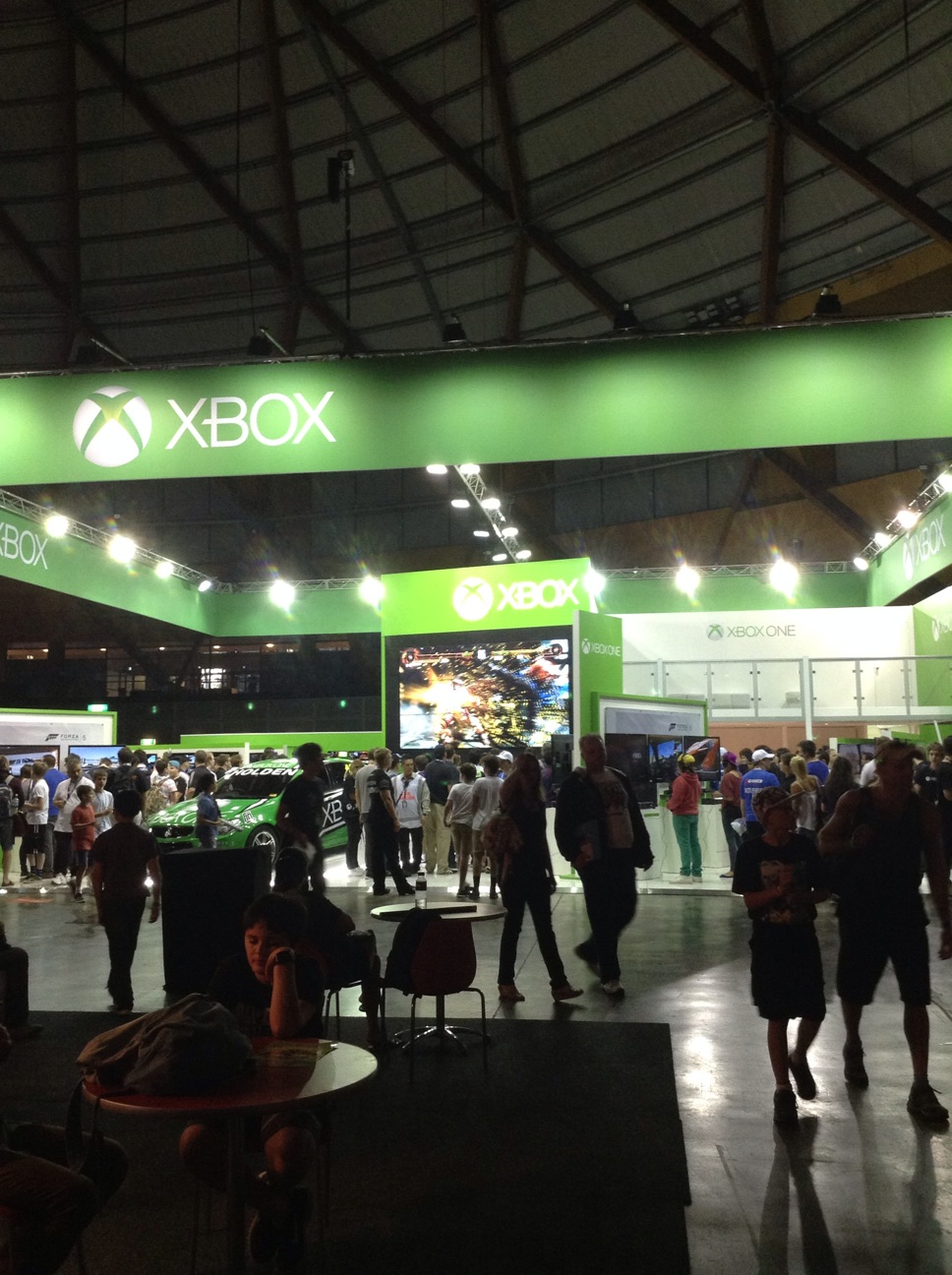
A view of the Xbox pavilion at the 2013 EB Games Expo

EB Games Expo 2013 was held at the Sydney Showground from 4–6 October. The expo was attended by over 38,000 people.

=== Exhibitors ===
2K Games: NBA 2K14; WWE 2K14; Activision: Call of Duty: Ghosts; Skylanders: Swap Force; Alienware All Interactive Entertainment Astro Video Gaming Equipment Banter Toys Bethesda Softworks: The Elder Scrolls Online; Wolfenstein: The New Order; Bluemouth Interactive Codemasters: F1 2013; Disney Interactive Studios: Disney Infinity; Electronic Arts: Battlefield 4; FIFA 14; Need for Speed: Rivals; The Sims 4; Titanfall; Gaem Game Informer Goldie Ikon Collectables InComm	Konami: Castlevania: Lords of Shadow 2; Pro Evolution Soccer 2014; Logitech Microsoft: Dead Rising 3; Forza Motorsport 5; Ryse: Son of Rome; Xbox One; Namco Bandai: Adventure Time: Explore the Dungeon Because I Don't Know!; Dark Souls II; Pac-Man and the Ghostly Adventures; Nintendo: Nintendo 3DS; Wii U; Parrot AR.Drone PDP Plantronics Gamecom Qantm Razer Sega Sennheiser Skullcandy Sony: Gran Turismo 6; PlayStation 4	Square Enix: Kingdom Hearts HD 1.5 Remix; Lightning Returns: Final Fantasy XIII; Thief; Tecmo Koei: Yaiba: Ninja Gaiden Z; TRITTON Tt eSPORTS Turtle Beach Ubisoft: Assassin's Creed IV: Black Flag; The Crew; Just Dance 2014; Watch Dogs; Wargaming: World of Tanks; Warner Brothers Games: Batman: Arkham Origins; Batman: Arkham Origins Blackgate; Dying Light; Hot Wheels: World's Best Driver; Lego Friends; Lego Marvel Super Heroes; The Lego Movie Videogame; Mad Max; Scribblenauts Unmasked

== 2014 ==
EB Games Expo 2014 was held at the Sydney Showground from 3–5 October. Sessions were from 9am to 3pm and from 3pm to 9pm. The twilight session was only allowed for people older than 15.

=== Exhibitors ===
2K Games: Borderlands: The Pre-Sequel!; Evolve; NBA 2K15; WWE 2K15; Activision: Call of Duty: Advanced Warfare.; Skylanders: Trap Team; Astro Video Gaming Equipment Bethesda Softworks: The Evil Within; CD Projekt Red: The Witcher 3; Codemasters: F1 2014; Disney Interactive Studios: Disney Infinity: Marvel Super Heroes; Electronic Arts: Battlefield Hardline; FIFA 15; GameSpot Little Orbit: Adventure Time: The Secret of the Nameless Kingdom; Logitech Microsoft: Dance Central: Spotlight Edition; Fantasia: Music Evolved; Forza Horizon 2; Halo: The Master Chief Collection; Lovers in a Dangerous Spacetime; Minecraft: Xbox One Edition; Ori and the Blind Forest; Project Spark: Sunset Overdrive; Mindscape: Metal Gear Solid V: The Phantom Pain; Namco Bandai: Adventure Time: The Secret of the Nameless Kingdom; Dragon Ball Xenoverse; Naruto Shippuden: Ultimate Ninja Storm Revolution; Project CARS	Nintendo: Super Smash Bros. for Nintendo 3DS and Super Smash Bros. for Wii U; Splatoon; Captain Toad: Treasure Tracker; Plantronics QV Software: Dead Island 2; Razer Inc. Riot Games: League of Legends; Roccat Sega: Alien: Isolation; Sony: Bloodborne; DRIVECLUB; Hotline Miami 2; LittleBigPlanet 3; SingStar Ultimate Party; The Order: 1886; Until Dawn; Square Enix: Kingdom Hearts HD 2.5 ReMIX; Lara Croft and the Temple of Osiris; Sleeping Dogs: Definitive Edition; TT eSports Turtle Beach Ubisoft: Assassin's Creed Rogue; Assassin's Creed Unity; Far Cry 4; Just Dance 2015; The Crew; Tom Clancy's The Division; Warner Brothers Games: Dying Light; Gauntlet; LEGO Batman 3: Beyond Gotham; Middle-earth: Shadow of Mordor; Mortal Kombat X

== 2015 ==
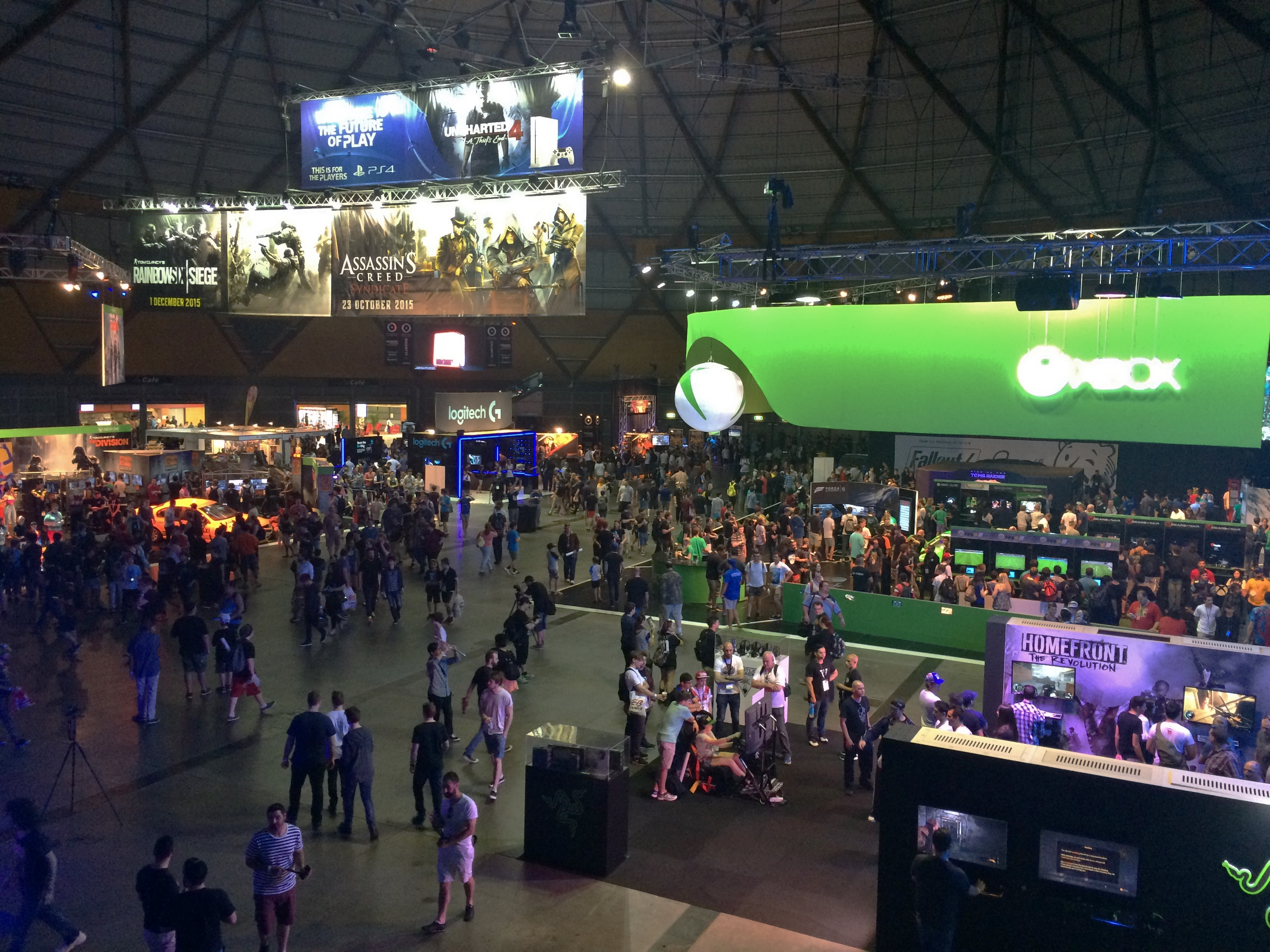
A view of the show floor at The Dome (Sydney Showground Hall 1), during the Expo

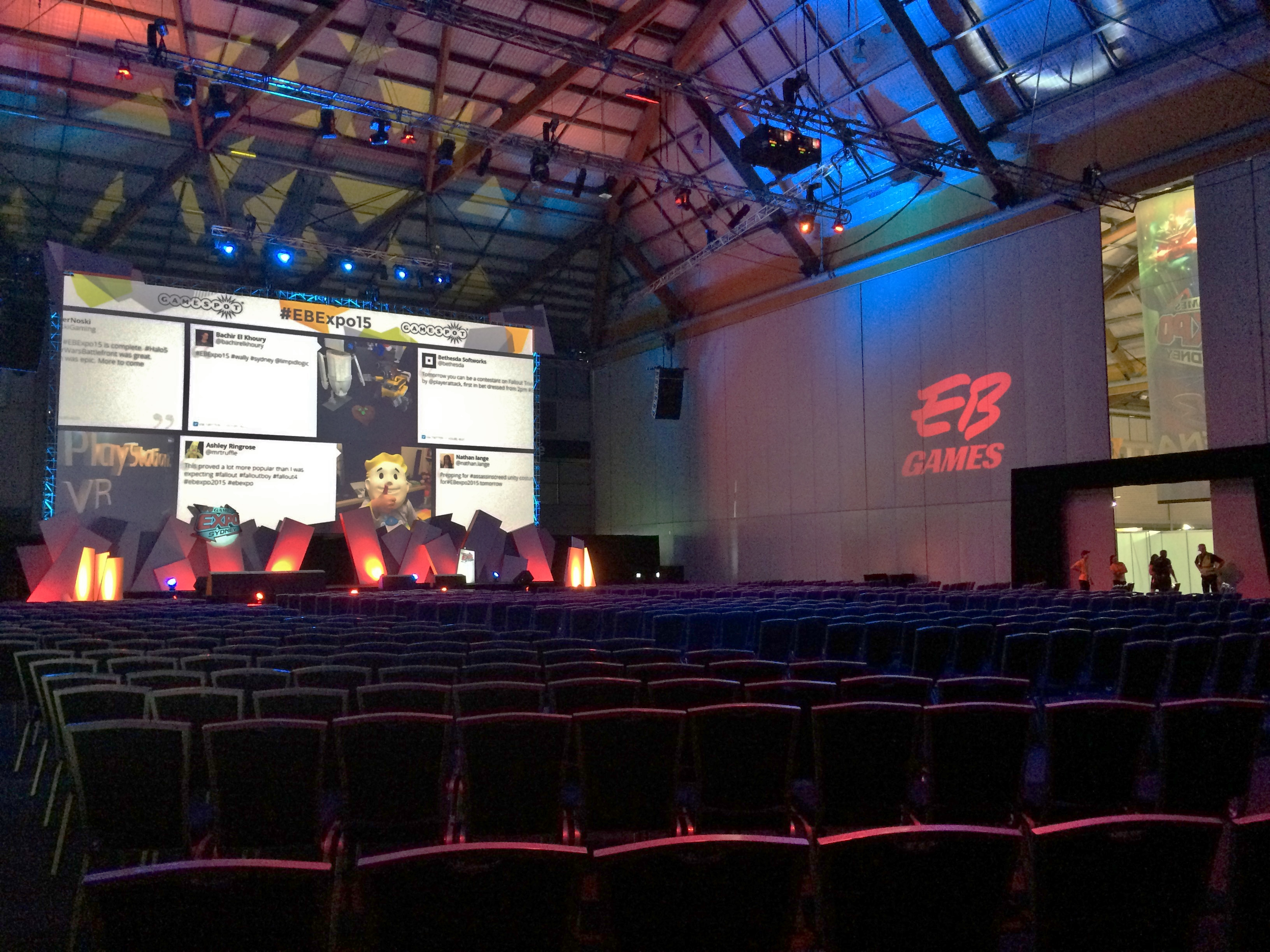
"The Arena", the presentation stage, which had shrunk in capacity from previous years

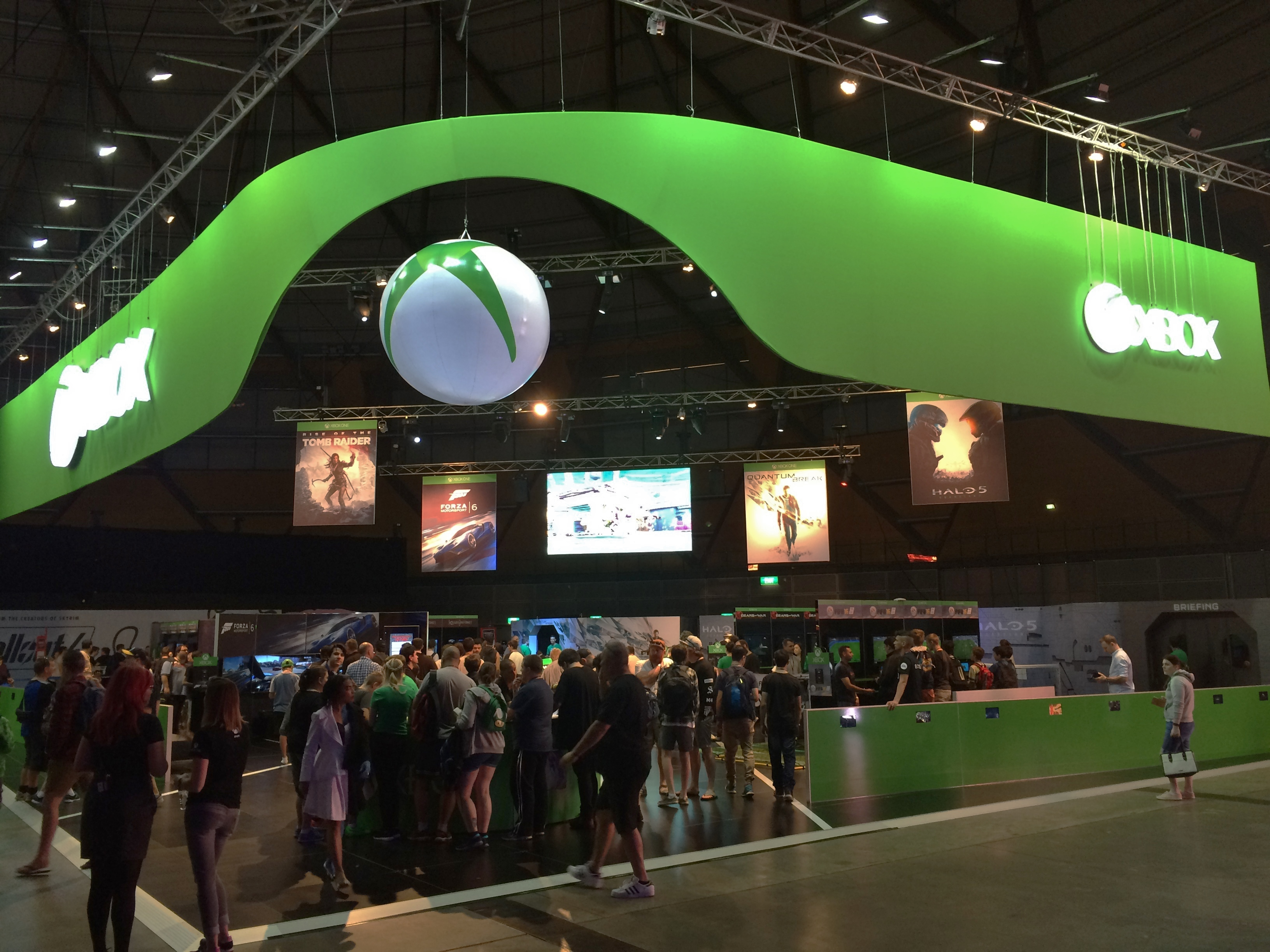
A view of the entrance to the Xbox One booth, the largest at the show

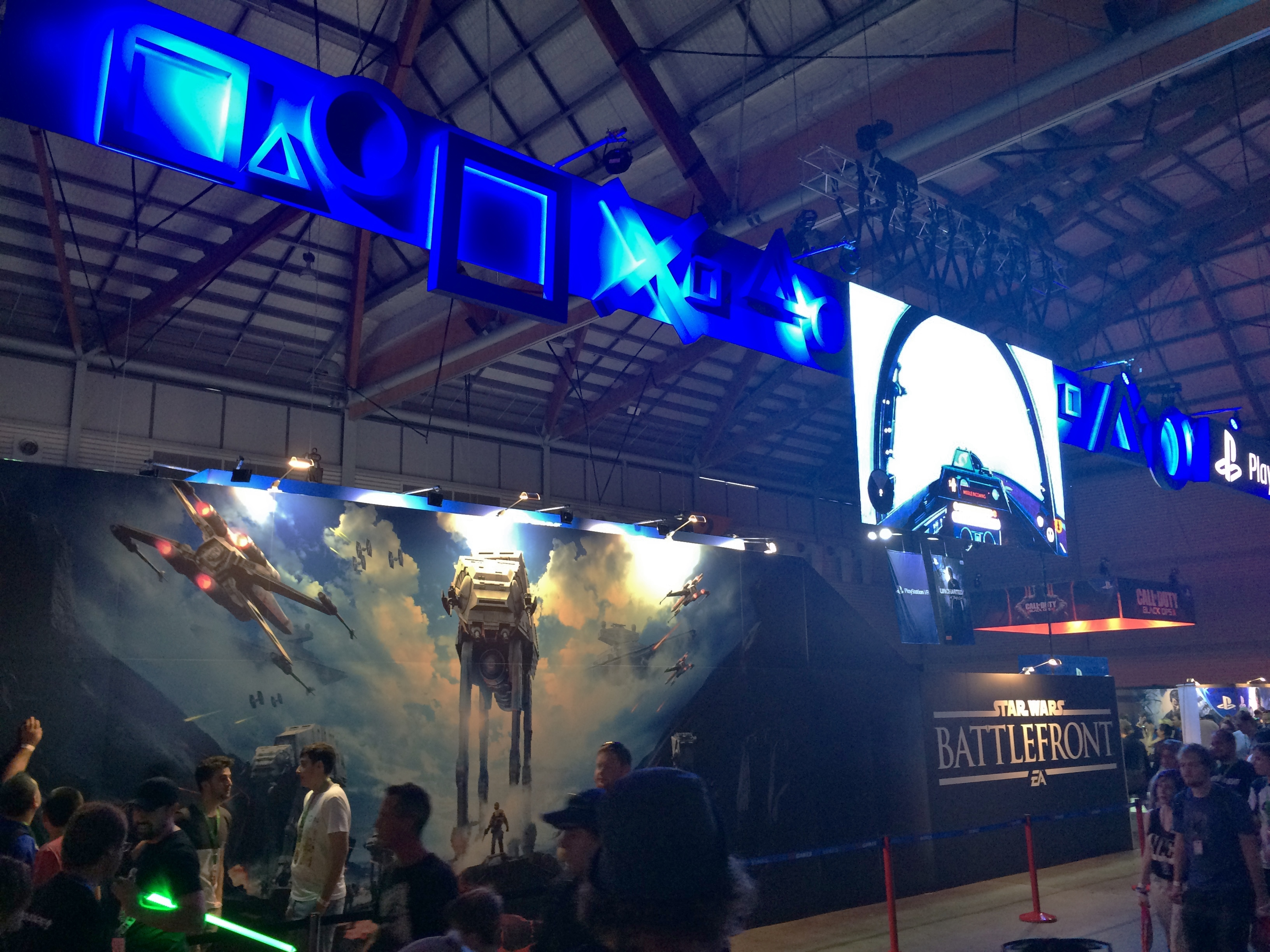
A view of the PlayStation booth, with the start of the line for Star Wars: Battlefront in the foreground

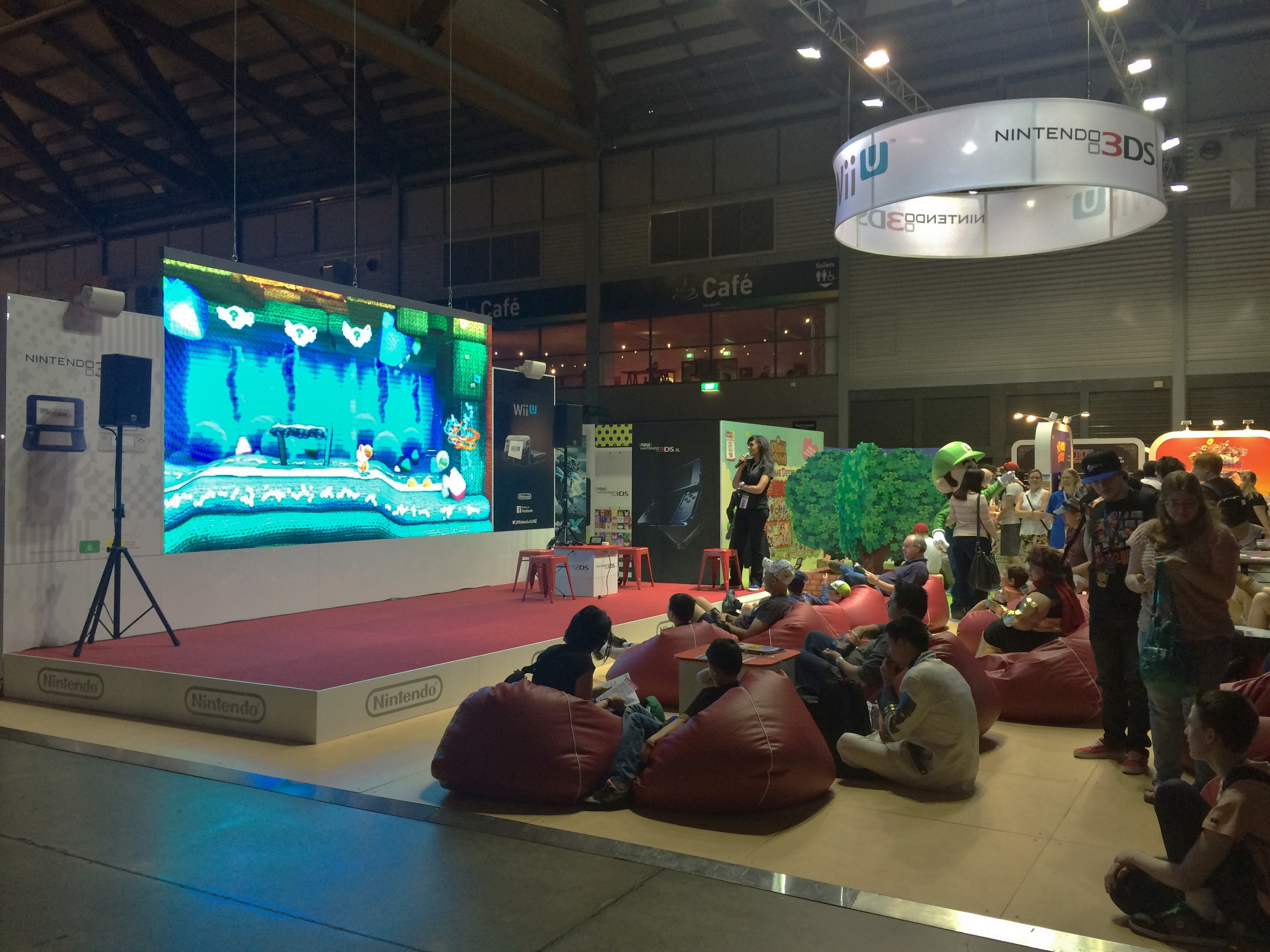
The stage at the Nintendo booth, during a presentation of Yoshi's Woolly World

The 2015 edition of the EB Games Expo ran from 2–4 October 2015 at the Sydney Showground. The event had two "daylight" and "twilight" sessions, each six and four hours long respectively, on 2 and 3 October, with one six-hour session on 4 October, following the same format as the previous two years. The Dome (Hall 1), Ross Pavilion (Hall 2) and Binnie Pavilion (Hall 3) once again hosted the exhibition floor. This expo was the third to showcase games for the PlayStation 4 and the Xbox One, and the fifth to showcase games for the Wii U. Multi-platform games Star Wars: Battlefront and Call of Duty: Black Ops III were available exclusively at Sony Computer Entertainment's PlayStation stand.

=== Exhibition ===
The 2015 edition of the EB Games Expo was the first without the presence of Riot Games or League of Legends. In previous years, Riot had staged the annual Oceanic Regional Finals for League at the convention, but had instead chosen to host it instead in August 2015 at Luna Park Sydney, where it was able to host a larger audience than the Southee Complex at the Sydney Showground; the event's previous venue at the 2014 EB Games Expo.

=== Entertainment ===
The Expo featured a performance from comedy duo The Umbilical Brothers, and comedian John Robertson, presenting his stand-up act Horror Stories from a Bad Gamer.

=== Exhibitors ===
Activision showcased the fifth entry in the Skylanders franchise with Skylanders: Superchargers, promoting the game at the event by giving away exclusive "Frightful Fiesta" Skylanders figures to the first few attendees to visit the booth. In addition to Forza Motorsport 6 and Remedy Entertainment's Quantum Break, Halo 5: Guardians was available to play at the Xbox booth, showcasing the game's 24-player "Warzone" multiplayer mode on the show floor. The Xbox stand also made use of a "One Pass", a card that allowed attendees to tap in after playing certain games in the booth, entering a draw to win prizes. In contrast to previous years where the One Pass was a separate card, it was incorporated into the wristband sold upon the purchase of a ticket to the expo.

==== Showcase ====
List of video game exhibitors and games showcased by booth
2K: Battleborn (Gearbox Software / 2K Games); NBA 2K16 (Visual Concepts / 2K Games); WWE 2K16 (Visual Concepts / 2K Games); Activision: Guitar Hero Live (FreeStyleGames / Activision); Skylanders: SuperChargers (Vicarious Visions / Activision); Bandai Namco Entertainment: Adventure Time: Finn & Jake Investigations (Vicious Cycle / Little Orbit); Dark Souls III (FromSoftware / Bandai Namco); Dragon Quest Heroes (Omega Force / Square Enix); Just Cause 3 (Avalanche Studios / Square Enix); Kung Fu Panda: Showdown of Legendary Legends (Vicious Cycle / Little Orbit); Naruto Shippuden: Ultimate Ninja Storm 4 (CyberConnect2 / Bandai Namco); Bethesda: Fallout 4 (Bethesda); Electronic Arts: FIFA 16 (EA Canada); Mirror's Edge Catalyst (EA DICE); Need for Speed (Ghost Games / Electronic Arts); Plants vs. Zombies: Garden Warfare 2 (PopCap Games / Electronic Arts); PlayStation: Alienation (Housemarque / SCE); Assassin's Creed Syndicate (Ubisoft Quebec / Ubisoft); Call of Duty: Black Ops III (Treyarch / Activision); Destiny: The Taken King (Bungie / Activision); Disney Infinity 3.0 (Avalanche Software / Disney Interactive Studios); Everybody's Gone to the Rapture (The Chinese Room / SCE); Fat Princess Adventures (Fun Bits Interactive / SCE); FIFA 16 (EA Canada / EA); Journey: Collector's Edition (Thatgamecompany / SCE); Ratchet & Clank (Insomniac Games / SCE); Star Wars: Battlefront (EA DICE / Electronic Arts); Shadow of the Beast (Heavy Spectrum / SCE); Street Fighter V (Capcom); Tearaway Unfolded (Tarsier Studios / SCE); Uncharted 4: A Thief's End (Naughty Dog / SCE); Uncharted: The Nathan Drake Collection (Bluepoint Games / SCE)	Ubisoft: Assassin's Creed Syndicate (Ubisoft Quebec); Just Dance 2016 (Ubisoft); Tom Clancy's Rainbow Six Siege (Ubisoft Montreal); Tom Clancy's The Division (Ubisoft); Nintendo: Splatoon (Nintendo); Skylanders: SuperChargers (Vicarious Visions / Activision); Star Fox Zero (Nintendo); Super Mario Maker (Nintendo); The Legend of Zelda: Tri Force Heroes (Nintendo); Yo-Kai Watch (Level-5 / Nintendo); QV Software / Turn Left Distribution: Homefront: The Revolution (Dambuster Studios / Deep Silver); Street Fighter V (Capcom); WRC 5 (Kylotonn Games / Black Bean Games); Warner Bros.: Lego Dimensions (Traveller's Tales / Warner Bros.); Lego Marvel's Avengers (Traveller's Tales / Warner Bros.); Mad Max (Avalanche Studios / Warner Bros.; Xbox One^{[a]}: Cuphead (Studio MDHR); FIFA 16 (EA Canada / EA); Forza Motorsport 6 (Turn 10 Studios / Microsoft Studios); Gears of War: Ultimate Edition (Epic Games / Microsoft Studios); Halo 5: Guardians (343 Industries / Microsoft Studios); Happy Dungeons (Toylogic / Microsoft Studios); Killer Instinct: Season 3 (Microsoft Studios); Minecraft: Xbox One Edition (Mojang / Microsoft Studios); NBA 2K16 (Visual Concepts / 2K Games); Quantum Break (Remedy Entertainment / Microsoft Studios); Rare Replay (Rare / Microsoft Studios); Rise of the Tomb Raider (Crystal Dynamics / Microsoft Studios); The Flame in the Flood (The Molasses Flood); Tumblestone (The Quantum Astrophysicists Guild)
List of electronics and accessories exhibitors
Astro Gaming; GMS; Home Entertainment Suppliers; Logitech G; Origin PC	Plantronics Gaming; Roccat; SteelSeries; Thermaltake

^[a]The Xbox pavilion was referred to as the "Xbox One" pavilion during EB Games Expo 2015.

== 2016 ==
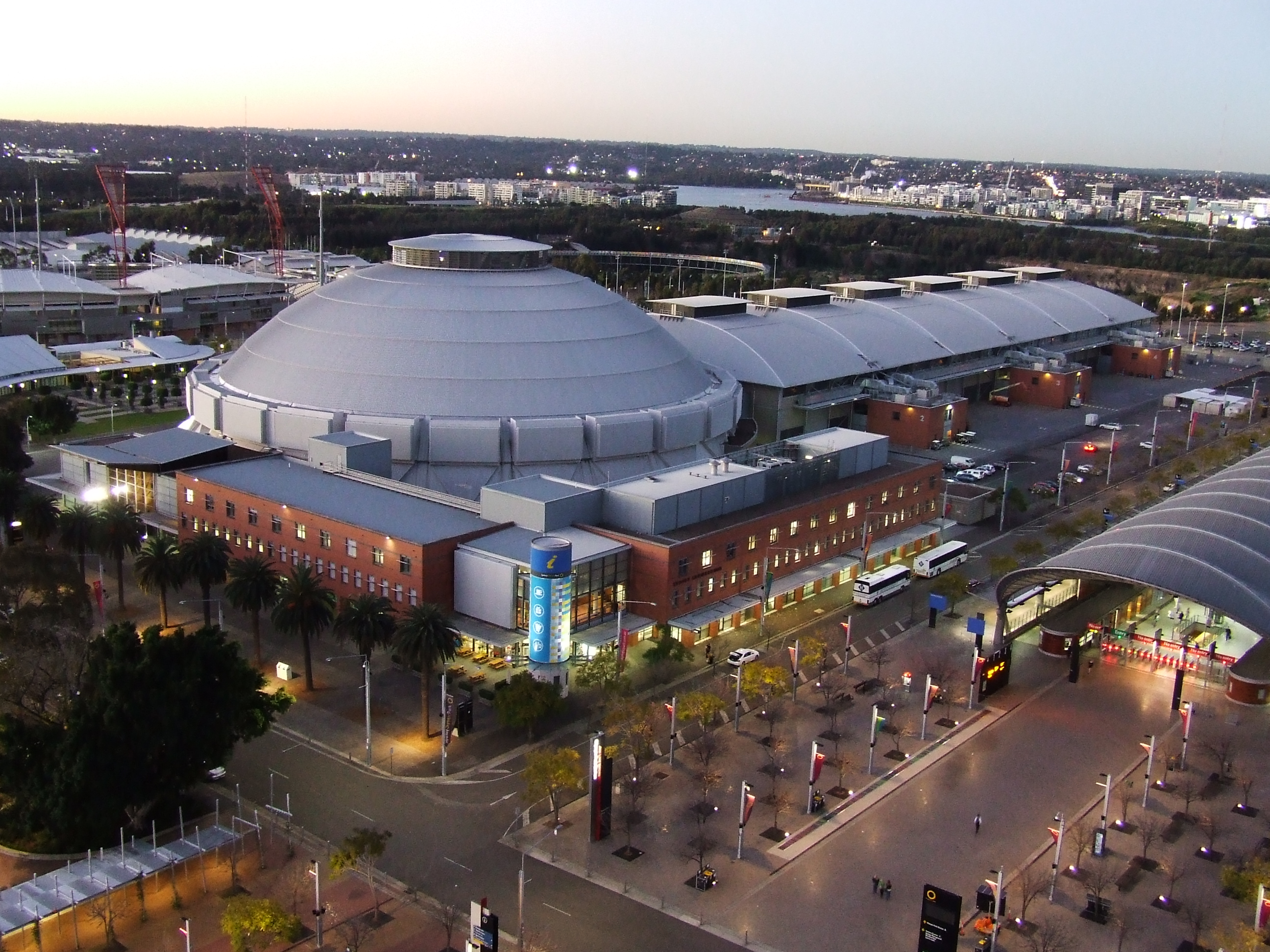

The sixth annual running of the EB Games took place at the Sydney Showground from 30 September to 2 October 2016. PlayStation VR made its second and final appearance before its commercial release in October 2016. Ubisoft's lineup of games for 2016–17 release included Watch Dogs 2, For Honor, Just Dance 2017, Tom Clancy's Ghost Recon: Wildlands, Steep and South Park: The Fractured but Whole.

=== Exhibition ===
Following an identical format to previous years, the 2016 edition of the EB Games Expo was open on two sessions on the Friday and Saturday of the expo, known as "daylight" and "twilight" sessions, and a single session on Sunday. Daylight sessions last six hours, from 9am to 3pm, while twilight sessions run for five hours from 4pm to 9pm; the Sunday session, designated as "family day", lasts eight hours.

The expo featured an "E-Sports Alley", touted as an e-sports competition venue for "kids, parents and pro e-athletes". Over 2,000 prizes, worth $10,000 in total, were given away in competitions held at the E-Sports Alley. Competitions for cosplayers were also held, per tradition at the expo, with exclusive competitions and prizes, worth $5,000, available to those who purchased an "Ultimate Cosplayer Pass" ticket – a new ticket class introduced for the 2016 expo.

=== Entertainment ===
Non-gaming attractions at the 2016 edition of the EB Games Expo include the annual Lego exhibition, a "horror maze", movie vehicles, and the Zing Pop Culture and EB Games Australia Megastore.

=== Exhibitors ===
At least nine video game publishers exhibited, including Activision, Nintendo, Sony Interactive Entertainment (PlayStation), Ubisoft and Microsoft Studios (Xbox). PlayStation VR made its second appearance at the expo, its last before its release in October 2016.

==== Showcase ====
List of video game exhibitors and games showcased by booth
Activision: Skylanders Imaginators (Toys for Bob); Bandai Namco Entertainment: Dragon Ball Xenoverse 2 (Dimps); Bethesda Sony Interactive Entertainment	Ubisoft: For Honor; Just Dance 2017; South Park: The Fractured but Whole; Steep; Tom Clancy's Ghost Recon: Wildlands; Watch Dogs 2; Nintendo: The Legend of Zelda: Breath of the Wild (Nintendo); QV Software / Turn Left Distribution Warner Bros. Microsoft Studios
List of tabletop game exhibitors and games showcased by booth
Hasbro: Monopoly; Top Trumps
List of electronics and accessories exhibitors
Afterglow; Astro Gaming; GMS; Licensing Essentials; Logitech G	Plantronics Gaming; Razer; Roccat; Thermaltake; Turtle Beach

== 2017 ==
EB Games Expo 2017 was held on 7–8 October at the Gold Coast Convention and Exhibition Centre.

== 2018 ==
EB Games Expo 2018 was held between 26 and 28 October as part of the Penny Arcade Expo at the Melbourne Convention and Exhibition Centre.
