= Team Roccat =

German esports organization

- Team Roccat used the logo of their titular sponsor, Roccat GmbH.
- Short name: ROC
- Divisions: Counter-Strike: Global Offensive; Heroes of the Storm; League of Legends; StarCraft II
- Founded: 2007
- Folded: 2018
- League: European League of Legends Championship Series (EU LCS)
- Based in: Adlershof, Berlin, Germany
- Arena: Riot Games Studio

Team Roccat (stylized as Team ROCCAT) was a German professional esports organization with players competing in Counter-Strike: Global Offensive, Heroes of the Storm, League of Legends, and StarCraft II. Its titular sponsor was the German computer accessories manufacturer Roccat GmbH, which was acquired by Turtle Beach in 2019.

== League of Legends ==
Team Roccat entered the professional League of Legends scene after it acquired the roster of the EU LCS team Kiedyś Miałem Team in 2014. The team finished 3rd in the 2014 EU LCS Spring Split and 4th in the 2014 EU LCS Summer Split.

Steeelback joined Team Roccat on 29 April 2016.

Team Roccat finished last in the 2016 EU LCS Summer Split, forcing them to play through the relegation tournament. However, the team managed to defeat Millenium and FC Schalke 04 to re-qualify for the 2017 EU LCS Spring Split.

The organization announced in late 2018 that it would not apply for a spot in the newly rebranded League of Legends European Championship (LEC). Many of its players and staff later joined Rogue.

=== Final roster ===
Nat.	ID	Name	Role	Join date
(South Korea)	Profit	Kim Jun-hyung	Top Laner	11 December 2017
(Sweden)	Memento	Jonas Elmarghichi	Jungler	12 December 2017
(South Korea)	Blanc	Jin Seong-min	Mid Laner	13 December 2017
(Estonia)	HeaQ	Martin Kordmaa	Bot Laner	14 December 2017
(Norway)	Norskeren	Tore Hoel Eilertsen	Support	15 December 2017
(United Kingdom)	fredy122	Simon Payne	Coach	24 December 2016
