= Dr Disrespect =

American live streamer (born 1982)

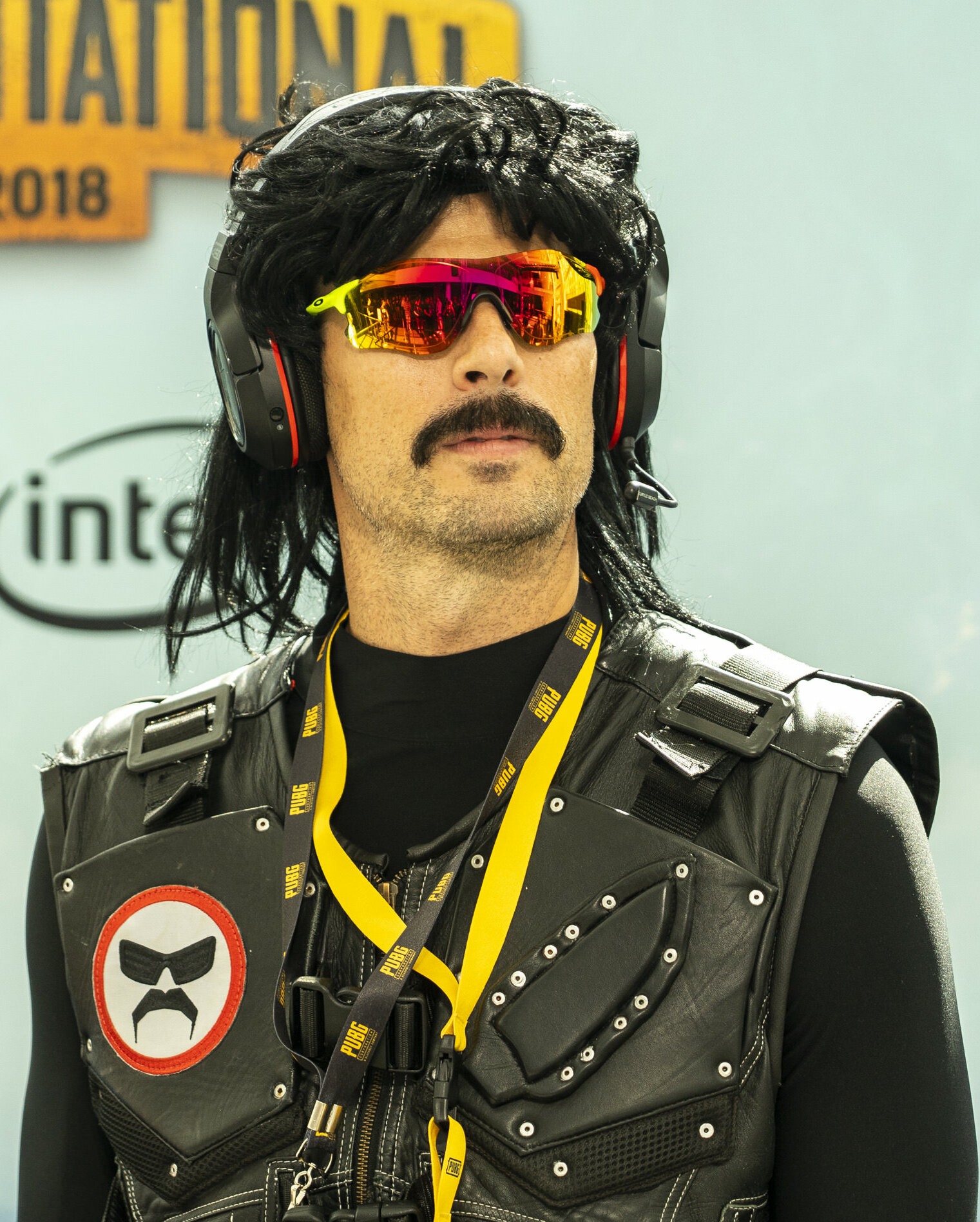
- Beahm as Dr Disrespect in 2018
- Born: Herschel Beahm IV; March 10, 1982 (age 44); Encinitas, California, U.S.
- Education: California State Polytechnic University, Pomona (BS)

Twitch information
- Channel: DrDisRespect
- Years active: 2011–2020
- Genre: Gaming

YouTube information
- Channel: DrDisRespect
- Years active: 2010–present
- Genre: Gaming
- Subscribers: 4.34 million
- Views: 933 million
- Dr Disrespect's voice For the Turtle Beach headsets commercial Dr Disrespect commercial audio.ogg
- Last updated: October 30, 2026

Herschel "Guy" Beahm IV (born 10 March 1982), better known as Dr Disrespect or The Doc or DDR, is an American live streamer. He became known for playing battle royale games such as Call of Duty: Black Ops 4, H1Z1, and PUBG: Battlegrounds on Twitch and YouTube. While streaming, he takes on a bombastic persona. He has invested in game studios, including founding the Midnight Society.

In June 2020, Beahm was permanently banned from Twitch for then-undisclosed reasons. He returned to streaming on YouTube a month later. In June 2024, former Twitch employees disclosed that his ban was due to inappropriately messaging a minor using Twitch's Whisper feature (Note: An unencrypted private communication feature that allows a user to directly message another in Twitch's chat akin to direct messaging) in 2017, although no criminal charges were filed and Beahm has stated that nothing criminal happened. He later apologized to his family, fans, and all involved. YouTube demonetized and suspended his channel from the platform's partner program, and his partnerships were suspended. In November 2024, Beahm signed a deal to stream on Rumble and became an advisor for its gaming category. His YouTube channel was remonetized in January 2025.

== Early life ==
Herschel Beahm IV was born on March 10, 1982, in Encinitas, California. He attended California State Polytechnic University, Pomona, where he played NCAA Division II men's basketball for the Broncos.

Beahm began playing Halo: Combat Evolved and Halo 2 in college and became known in the Halo community while using the gamertag "Diarrhea Panic" for his trash talking via the game's proximity chat.

== Career ==
=== Start as a YouTuber ===
On January 12, 2010, Beahm published his first YouTube video on the "Dr Disrespect" channel, which is a variation of then-popular Call of Duty: Modern Warfare 2 commentary videos. It mixed clips of Beahm trash talking over footage of gameplay with real-life footage of him in costume as Dr Disrespect, his persona of a bombastic and body-armored "champion". He had purchased the character's signature wig, mustache, and glasses from a costume shop. The video's success led to Beahm becoming a partnered creator with Machinima, which was then a prominent gaming network on YouTube.

In February 2011, Beahm announced that he was taking a hiatus to be hired, on March 16, as the community manager of Sledgehammer Games. At Sledgehammer, he expanded his role to include level designing for Call of Duty: Advanced Warfare in 2014.

=== Early livestreaming career ===
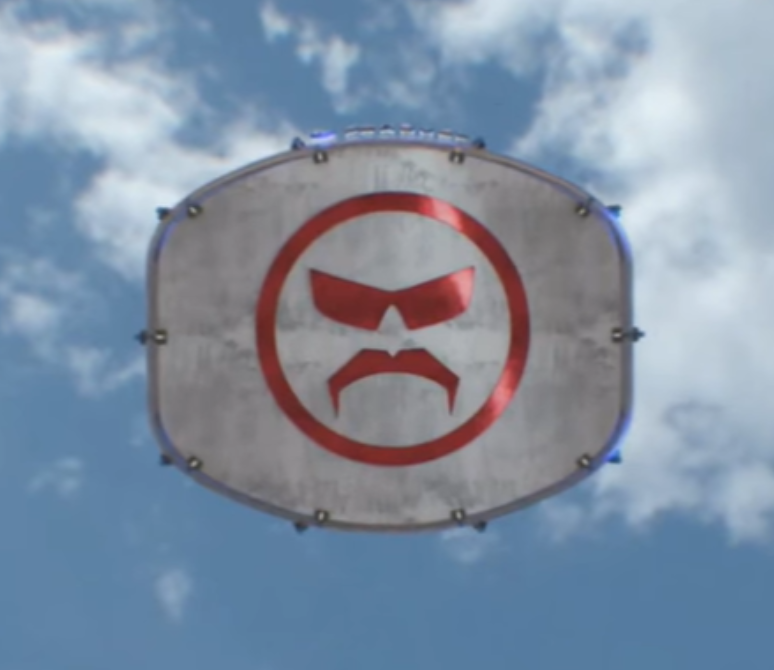
The "Champions Club" logo seen, the website was launched in 2018

He joined Justin.tv (which later became Twitch) while he was working at Sledgehammer, and quit the studio at the end of 2015 to focus on a full-time live streaming career.

Under his Dr Disrespect persona, Beahm gained a significant following for playing battle royale games, starting in 2016 with H1Z1 before switching to PUBG: Battlegrounds and then Call of Duty: Black Ops 4's Blackout mode; he had also livestreamed gameplay of Apex Legends, Call of Duty: Warzone, Fortnite Battle Royale, and Fall Guys. His stream of PUBG: Battlegrounds on February 5, 2018, reached a total of 388,000 concurrent viewers, nearing Tyler1's record of 410,000. His high viewership numbers led to sponsorship deals with Gillette, Asus, Roccat, and Game Fuel, among others. On January 10, 2019, Creative Artists Agency signed Beahm as a client. According to a June 2024 Rolling Stone report, he had not been a client since at least months prior.

Beahm has faced controversy for various on-stream comments. One significant incident involved his uses of caricatured Eastern Asian accents and language. Musician Jimmy Wong compiled a series of clips highlighting these instances during his livestreams, accusing him of racism. He responded by stating that he has Asian friends and dismissing the criticism as "laughable".

On June 11, 2019, Dr Disrespect's Twitch channel was suspended as he was livestreaming while attending the 2019 edition of the Electronic Entertainment Expo (E3) in Los Angeles. Beahm and his cameraman went into a public restroom (he re-entered the restroom on two occasions, with filming still going on) at the venue in violation of Twitch's privacy rules. E3 organizer Entertainment Software Association revoked Dr Disrespect's E3 pass, banning him from the event. Twitch reinstated his channel on June 25.

=== Permanent ban from Twitch, move to YouTube, and fallout ===
Dr Disrespect
(@drdisrespect)
tweeted:

Listen, I'm obviously tied to legal obligations from the settlement with Twitch but I just need to say what I can say since this is the fucking internet.

I didn't do anything wrong, all this has been probed and settled, nothing illegal, no wrongdoing was found, and I was paid.

Elden Ring Monday.

June 22, 2024

Beahm signed a multi-year deal with Twitch in March 2020. On June 26, his account was indefinitely banned from Twitch for violating their Community Guidelines. That same day, Discord removed Dr Disrespect from their partnership program, citing violations of their Code of Conduct. He tweeted that he was not informed of Twitch's "specific reason behind their decision". A month later, in interviews with PC Gamer and The Washington Post, he insisted that he did not know why Twitch banned him and debunked "crazy speculation" and conspiracy theories over it. On August 7, he started a livestream on YouTube at 12:00 pm. PDT (8:00 pm. UTC); the next day at 4:00 pm. PDT (12:00 am. UTC), he appeared on-stream and briefly addressed his ban. Beahm claimed in August 2021 that he knew the reason and sued Twitch. The legal dispute was eventually resolved in 2022, with neither party admitting wrongdoing and "moving on". Beahm later claimed his contract was paid out in full.

Beahm criticized Twitch for banning him, claiming that it cost him "a lot of sponsorships". He also claimed that he declined a "gracious" $10 million annual offer to stream on Kick, an alternative platform known for hosting controversial content creators, because his demand for $50 million was not met. Allegations eventually emerged in June 2024 that Beahm had sent sexually explicit messages to a minor. Former Twitch director of strategic partnerships Cody Conners tweeted on June 21 that he "got caught sexting a minor in the then existing Twitch whispers product" in 2017.

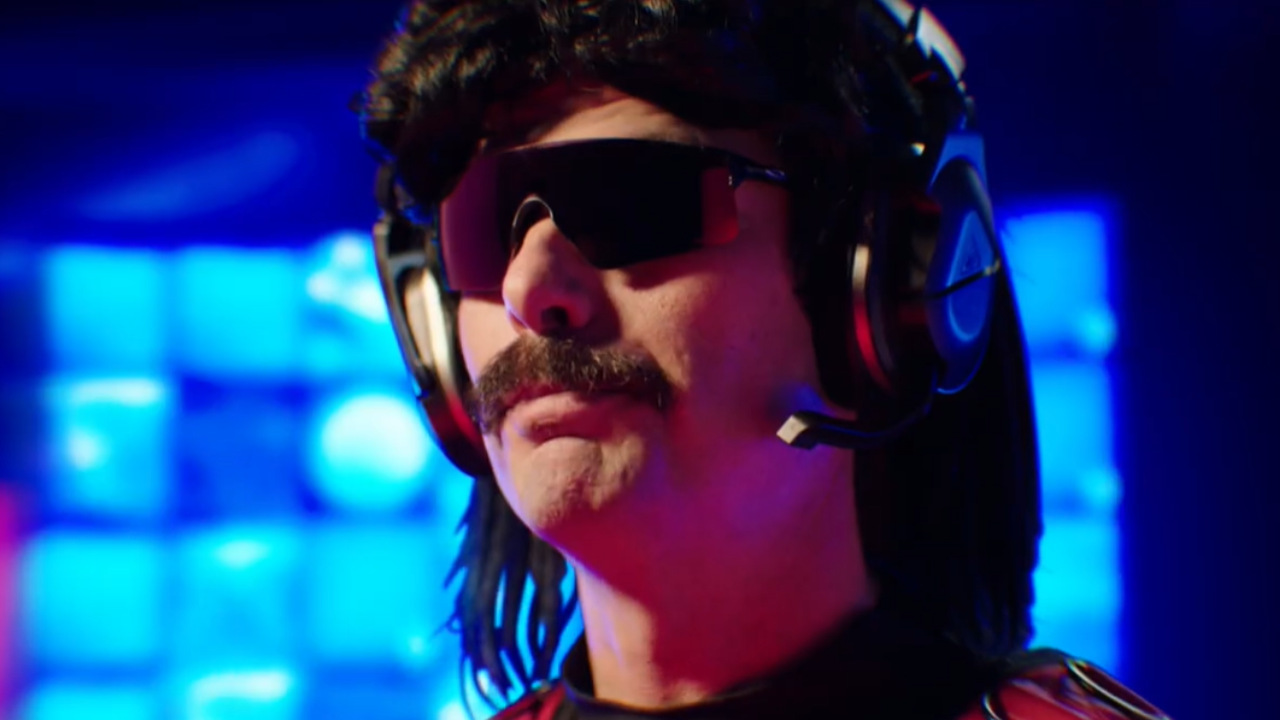
Dr Disrespect in 2021

Beahm denied the allegations, stating that he did "nothing illegal, no wrongdoing was found, and I was paid". On a livestream of Elden Ring, he considered leaving his business ventures, saying that he was "burnt out" by the allegations. He later acknowledged that some of his messages could be loosely deemed "inappropriate,"; that statement was removed in August, and he tweeted afterwards that "we have lots to talk about".

An additional former Twitch employee came forward and alleged to Rolling Stone that Beahm's statement the messages were not sexually explicit was inaccurate, characterizing the messages as "sexually graphic" and that Beahm kept sending these messages even after being made aware the individual was underage.

In response, YouTube temporarily suspended Beahm's access to YouTube's monetization features. His partnerships with FanDuel, Midnight Society (a game studio he helped found), Turtle Beach and other sponsors were also suspended. Just prior to YouTube's suspension of monetization on Beahm's channel, the platform's former global head of gaming partnerships at Google, Ryan Wyatt, confirmed to Rolling Stone that Beahm was not offered a contract due to internal discussions about the circumstances of his Twitch ban. Wyatt stated that a Twitch employee and journalists investigating the situation had informed YouTube staff that the ban allegedly involved inappropriate messages to a minor.

On September 6, 2024, Beahm returned to streaming on YouTube, denied the allegations and stated that neither he "nor the Twitch user exchanged any sexually graphic messages or images". He claimed that Conners does not participate in Twitch investigations, "didn't have any firsthand knowledge about my dispute with Twitch," and was thus lying. Beahm additionally noted he never intended to meet anyone at TwitchCon, did not go to TwitchCon, and further accused the former Twitch community manager of targeting him. Later that month his remonetization request to YouTube was denied but was eventually re-monetized in early 2025 after moving to Rumble.

On January 30, 2025, Beahm's YouTube channel was reinstated for monetization. In a statement provided to PC Gamer, YouTube said, "Dr Disrespect was previously suspended from the YouTube Partner Program for violations of our Creator Responsibility policies. Creators who are suspended from this program can reapply for access, and after careful review of the channel's recent activity, we've reinstated it."

In January 2026, Beahm spoke about why streamers still will not play with him. He said he misses playing with "Timmy" (TimTheTatman) and thinks Tim misses playing with him too. "A lot of agencies control those conversations," he said. "Like, 'Hey, right now it's risky to play with him because then we can't get these partnerships.' But I do miss playing with Timmy. Nickmercs? No — f*** that phony."

=== Rumble deal ===
On November 25, 2024, Beahm announced that he had signed a deal with streaming platform Rumble that included equity in the company and a role as the head and advisor of its Rumble Gaming category. The contract required Beahm to produce exclusive content for Rumble Premium for his Champions Club community as well as streaming free content on the site starting in early December. Beahm also made a social media post on his personal account claiming that he was a victim of cancel culture based on falsehoods.

== Streaming persona ==
Dr Disrespect in 2021, in a promotion for FanDuel

Beahm's character, Dr Disrespect (also known as The Doc and The Two-Time (Note: He claims to have won the Blockbuster World Video Game Championships or NBA Jam at Marine World in 1993 and 1994.)), is usually depicted during livestreams as bombastic and provocative. Originally, he was depicted to have "a very serious, dark tone". His supporters and fandom are said to be part of the "Champions Club". Darin Kwilinski of ESPN described him as "a WWE character in the competitive gaming world" and Beahm said that he "created a character who plays multiplayer video games, and he's considered the most dominating gaming specimen".

While playing as Dr Disrespect, he wears a black mullet wig, sunglasses, a red or black long-sleeved athletic shirt, and a red or black tactical vest. He sports a mustache he has nicknamed "The Poisonous Ethiopian Caterpillar". Members of his family, if they make an appearance during a livestream, are also occasionally mentioned as part of the Dr Disrespect persona, with his wife portraying "Mrs. Assassin" and their daughter as "Baby Assassin" or "Baby Disrespect".

== Projects ==
=== Video game development ===
In October 2020, Beahm worked with Hi-Rez Studios to design a custom map and a Dr Disrespect character skin for the third-person shooter video game Rogue Company. The content was removed in July 2024, and the developers offered "Rogue Bucks" refunds for the prior purchases of the skin, which was criticized by players on social media.

In May 2021, Beahm invested in Bright Star Studios for the developers' massively multiplayer online role-playing game named Ember Sword.

In December, Beahm announced the launch of a game studio, Midnight Society, to be headed by him along with Call of Duty and Halo veterans Robert Bowling and Quinn DelHoyo. Their in-development free-to-play battle royale title, codenamed Project Moon and later Dead Drop and DEADROP, sparked criticism around the sale of "Founder's Access" NFTs which allow owners to provide input on the development of the game. On June 24, 2024, he was terminated from the studio after learning about the allegation of sending inappropriate messages to a minor. In January 2025, Midnight Society was closed on the same day that Beahm was remonetized from his YouTube channel.

In June 2024, shortly after the reason for Beahm's Twitch ban was revealed, 2K Sports removed all content in NBA 2K23 and NBA 2K24 featuring him including his character model, related elements from MyCareer mode, and his custom dunk and jump shot animations.

=== Other ventures ===
Excerpt of an advertisement with Turtle Beach by Dr Disrespect in 2017

Beahm collaborated with professional wrestler The Undertaker for a G Fuel commercial in February 2020, which was portrayed as a special feud.

In August, Beahm announced that he was writing a personal memoir called Violence. Speed. Momentum. about Dr Disrespect's origins. The book, fictitiously ghostwritten by "Nigel P. Farnsworth III", was published by Gallery Books, an imprint of Simon & Schuster, on March 30, 2021.

A fan of the San Francisco 49ers, Beahm collaborated with the San Francisco-based NFL team starting in early 2020. At the 2022 NFL draft, he announced in the 3rd round that the 49ers selected running back Tyrion Davis-Price from LSU. He was seen at the wild-card game between the 49ers and the Seattle Seahawks on January 14, 2023, at Levi's Stadium, where he sounded the team's ceremonial foghorn. Beahm's character was featured in several social media posts and videos from the team during the 2022 and 2023 seasons. In June 2024, the team suspended relations with Beahm after allegations he inappropriately messaged a minor.

== Personal life ==
Beahm is married and has a daughter. He resides in San Diego County, California. In December 2017, he confessed on a livestream to having cheated on his wife, and he stopped streaming for two months before returning in February 2018.

Beahm is a fan of the Golden State Warriors of the NBA, seen at games as Dr Disrespect at Oracle Arena and Chase Center.

== Filmography ==
=== Video games ===
Year	Title	Role	Notes
2020	Rogue Company	Dr Disrespect	Voice; removed in a patch
2021	PUBG Mobile	Dr Disrespect	Voice
2022	NBA 2K23	Dr Disrespect	Voice; removed in a patch
2023	NBA 2K24	Dr Disrespect	Voice; removed in a patch

== Awards and nominations ==
Year	Award	Category	Result	Ref.
2017	Esports Industry Awards	Streamer of the Year	Won	
2017	The Game Awards	Trending Gamer	Won	
2019	Esports Awards	Streamer of the Year	Won	
2021	Esports Awards	Streamer of the Year	Nominated	

== Notes ==
Blockbuster Champion: He claims the title of "Two-Time Back-to-Back Blockbuster Video Game Champion" for winning NBA Jam tournaments in 1993 and 1994.
