= Paladins (video game) =

2018 video game

Paladins: Champions of the Realm
- Xbox Store artwork featuring the game's playable characters
- Developer: Evil Mojo Games
- Publisher: Hi-Rez Studios
- Engine: Unreal Engine 3
- Platforms: Windows; PlayStation 4 Xbox One; Nintendo Switch (Note: Until June 21, 2023)
- Release: May 8, 2018; Nintendo Switch; June 12, 2018
- Genres: First-person shooter, hero shooter
- Mode: Multiplayer

Paladins: Champions of the Realm is a 2018 free-to-play online hero shooter video game by Hi-Rez Studios. The game was developed by Evil Mojo, an internal studio of Hi-Rez and was released on May 8, 2018, for Microsoft Windows, PlayStation 4, and Xbox One, followed by a Nintendo Switch version released on June 12, 2018.

Paladins was initially announced on October 3, 2012. as Global Agenda 2 and was scheduled to be released in mid-2013, intended as the sequel or spiritual sequel to the PvP mode of Global Agenda according to developers. After the closure of Global Agenda, it was decided to turn the game into a new franchise, so the game had several delays and changed its name several times, in the end the developers renamed the game as Paladins in early August 2015. The game had pre-alpha and alpha versions during 2015 but were not shown until August 3, 2015, when outlets like IGN were given permission to show the game content. But in September 2014, much of the game's content was leaked, despite the developers' attempts to avoid revealing information about the game. The Paladins closed beta started on November 17, 2015. In the Open Beta, the game appeared on September 16, 2016, in the Steam Early Access program.

Evil Mojo ended support for the Nintendo Switch version on June 21, 2023. Following layoffs at Evil Mojo, active development of Paladins as a whole was halted on February 6, 2025.

== Setting ==
Paladins takes place in a fantasy world called the Realm, a largely medieval world filled with elves, dwarves, dragons, and other fantasy races. In this world, there is a conflict between two factions: the Magistrate and the Resistance. The Magistrate serves as the ruling power of the Realm and wishes to keep it safe and peaceful by restricting the use of magic, largely in the form of magic crystals, which had been used by corrupt individuals to cause chaos and destruction. The Resistance meanwhile, despite the damage caused, believes crystals are too useful to be banned from the general public, leading to them coming together to fight the Magistrate. Many playable characters in the game belong to one of these two factions.

However, there are many others that are not part of either group, instead doing things by themselves, or being part of some of the numerous other factions with their goals, some notable ones being the "Abyss", a group of monsters from another dimension, the "Pyre", a group of beings with angelic designs that hate the Abyss, the "Thousand Hands Guild", a criminal empire, the "Darkness/Maw", a group of alien monsters that consume worlds, and several others.

== Gameplay ==
Paladins is a team-based first-person shooter that focuses on two groups of five players each, who compete for combat-based goals. The game is set in colorful sci-fi fantasy maps, where each player chooses a champion that cannot be repeated in the same team and cannot be changed in the match. Each champion has their own weapons, skills and fighting style; in addition, they can be enhanced and personalized from a card and skin system. The interface of each player is customizable, with avatars and customizable borders to symbolize the player's profile; titles when reaching mastery level 30 with a champion, among others.

=== Game modes ===
There are different gameplay modes for Paladins:

- Siege: The 'main' Paladins game mode, two teams of 5 race against each other to capture the map's central capture point and, if successful, push a payload that spawns from it to the enemy base. Each successful push or capture grants one point. Preventing the enemy team from pushing the payload also grants one point. Additionally, the team that captures the point will get a bonus of 300 credits. The first team to score four points wins the game. A team cannot score their fourth point on defense, however, meaning that the team must capture a point or push the payload to win.
- Onslaught: Teams battle over a large combat area in an attempt to take point control and earn points. Along with holding an uncontested presence on the control point, slaying enemy players also scores points for the team, akin to a team deathmatch.
- Choose any/Team Deathmatch: A classic game mode in most first-person shooter games, where two teams fight against each other to score kills. The first team to score 40 kills wins the game. Unlike other game modes, a player may select any champion that they have unlocked, regardless of if another member of their team had selected that champion.
- Ranked: The same game mode as Siege, however when players are choosing a champion, each team can pick three champions to ban, which makes them unavailable for either team. Also, each team can see the opponent's champions that are picked and selected, and once a champion is picked by any player on a team, the other team cannot use that same champion. A player must reach 100 TP (Triumph Points) to advance to the following rank (e.g. Bronze 1 to Bronze 2). Players may skip ranks if their performance in the current rank is extraordinary. Players below or in Platinum can queue with up to 4 players below or in Platinum. Platinum players can also queue with 1 Diamond player. Diamond and above can only duo as a 2 party.
  - Ranks are split like many other first person shooters:
    - Bronze 1–5
    - Silver 1–5
    - Gold 1–5
    - Platinum 1–5
    - Diamond 1–5
    - Master
    - Grandmaster (top 200 Master)
- Limited Game Modes: This mode acts as a party mode with various different modifiers and custom maps, unlike the 3 main modes. Gamemodes alternate weekly.

=== Loadouts ===
It is possible to customize the gameplay of the characters by unlocking talents (by leveling up) and by creating a deck with classic cards. Each champion has 3 talents. Each talent gives the champion a great advantage, but only one can be selected per game, they cannot stack. Each champion also has 16 classic cards (up to 5 cards can be used at the same time) that the player can use to build decks. Only one deck can be selected per game. Each card can be leveled up, from 1 to 5, which can be chosen by the player. Each deck must make 15 points in total.

=== Abilities ===
Each champion has a basic attack and varying skills. It usually has 3 skills in addition to basic attack (two mouse clicks and 3 keyboard keys). These skills can also have related passive bonuses. In addition to these “classic” skills, each champion has an “Ultimate” skill that allows situations to be turned around. Each ultimate attack is unique and often very powerful. To be used, they must be charged (percentage) by dealing damage to opponents.

=== Currency ===
The game has different currencies: Battle Pass XP for daily quests or in-game achievements, Crystals for purchase with real money, and Gold for leveling up, daily visits, quests or playing individual matches. Currencies can be used to purchase special items in the game.

=== Characters ===
The game's characters are divided into the roles of frontline, damage, support, and flanker.

== Development ==
Paladins arose from the idea of making a sequel to Global Agenda, which focused on improving PvP game modes, it was initially announced in 2012 and scheduled for release in mid-2013. Later, the developers preferred to change the aesthetics of the game. setting it in a fantasy world and turning it into a first-person game. At the time, the game was known as Aurum, although it went by the codename "Chaos". However, despite the initial goal of a fantasy setting, everything about the game was constantly changing, with what was essentially a new game being created every single day; with the sci-fi theme of Hi-Rez's previous title, Global Agenda, additionally being experimented with, potentially almost even outright becoming a sequel to the game.

There were multiple leaks of the game during its development period, where several of the game's characteristics could be known, such as game modes, designs and abilities of some characters, and weapons that would be recycled from Global Agenda. During this time some dubbed the game with the name of Global Assault.

Eventually, the developers found an iteration they were satisfied with. However, according to the developers, before they could show off the game, Blizzard's highly anticipated new game, Overwatch, was shown off. The developers claim they were worried about being compared to Overwatch and initially planned to implement some changes to make Paladins different to avoid this, but according to the developers, internal testing indicated players enjoyed the current version of the game, causing them to stick with their original plan.

=== Release ===
The game was officially announced for the first time as Paladins in early August 2015. Before that the game was in a pre-alpha for a few months but could not show game content, on August 3, 2015, permission was given for players and outlets like IGN to show the game. The Paladins closed beta started on November 17, 2015. In the Open Beta, the game appeared on September 16, 2016, in the Steam Early Access program. Within a week of the Open Beta launch on Steam, the game had reached 800,000 downloads and was one of the top ten most played games on Steam. On PlayStation 4 it was released on the PlayStation Store on May 2, 2017.

In June 2018, one month after its official release (Open Beta), the game reached an average of 18,000 active players per day. In November 2016, the game had surpassed four million registered users, and in mid-May 2017, the developer announced that the game already had over eleven million registered users. During 2018, this number surpassed between 30 and 35 million players. In March 2020, Hi-Rez reported that Paladins exceeded 40 million players. In December 2020, Paladins had seen roughly 45 million players.

=== Paladins Strike ===
Paladins Strike is the mobile version of the game, launched in May 2018. In Paladins Strike, most of the characters from the original game are present, with all their abilities adapted to suit the canons of the MOBA genre. Here too, the game is based on 5 vs. 5 battles. The fights are carried out in real time with an isometric top view. Paladins Strike is free-to-play: the game relies on micro-transactions and in-app purchases. Paladins Strike was officially shut down by Hi-Rez during mid-2020 to mid-2021.

=== Realm Royale ===
Realm Royale is the third-person shooter battle royale version of the game, launched in June 2018 via Steam's early access program. In January 2018, Hi-Rez decided to give Paladins a corresponding mode named Paladins: Battlegrounds. Later, the mode became its own game, called Realm Royale. The game is free-to-play, integrating micro-transactions and in-app purchases.

== Esports ==
Paladins is a title that was played as an esport. The Paladins Premier League (PPL) was founded in cooperation between the developer studio and the WESA. This promises the participating e-athletes a fixed salary and support from the clubs.

On August 1, 2017, the Paladins Global Series started, which is a community tournament with prizes worth 350,000 US dollars. It was announced at DreamHack in Valencia. The event was the largest community esports tournament in the world. Regional PC tournaments are held every month and players from Southeast Asia, Russia, North America, Brazil, Latin America, Europe and Oceania can take part. Open bracket tournaments are held in the first 3 weeks of each month, where the amateurs can prove themselves and qualify for the monthly tournament. The actual Global Series starts on August 1 and runs for 10 months with monthly payouts. The events are then also broadcast on live stream services such as Twitch or Facebook.

Paladins now has an active esports scene with several major tournaments per year, such as World Championships and DreamHack competitions (as of December 2019).

=== Event ===
Since 2020, Paladins hosts an annual event called the "Crystal Awards", a user-voted awards ceremony designed to highlight the Paladins community. Four finalists are selected by Evil Mojo within several categories, while the community votes for one finalist for each award. Following this, Hi-Rez Studios announces the winners during the Paladins World Championship.

== Reception ==
Reception

Aggregate score
Aggregator	Score
Metacritic	PC: 83/100; NS: 74/100

Review scores
Publication	Score
Eurogamer	8/10
IGN	8.4/10
Nintendo Life	8/10
Nintendo World Report	6.5/10
Pocket Gamer	3.5/5

The Microsoft Windows version of Paladins received "Generally favorable reviews" while the Nintendo Switch version received "Mixed or average reviews" according to review aggregator Metacritic.

IGN rated Paladins 8.4/10, stating "Working on top of the strong and fairly balanced foundation of a free-to-play hero shooter, Paladins' capacity for experimentation is its greatest strength" and "Whether it's the main mode that encapsulates the teamwork aspect or the character designs that immediately flow with creativity, Paladins: Champions of the Realm clearly stands out in the midst of competition." Gamereactor rated the game 7/10, praising the various characters, customization and maps, stating "Paladins might just win you over if you give it a try, and we'd definitely recommend you to do so". Common Sense Media gave the game 4/5 stars, describing it as a "Colorful multiplayer arena" that "offers frenetic team fun".

Ric Cowley of Pocket Gamer gave Paladins 3.5/5 stars, explaining "Paladins is actually a pretty fun shooter. There's plenty of depth to it, and the wide pool of characters and abilities means everyone's tastes are catered for. But it all just feels a little bit off. It's trying so hard to be something that it's not, and it never doubles down on its own ideas or identity." Canard PC rated the game 7/10, depicting it as a "competitive FPS" and complimenting the game despite the similarities between the game and Overwatch. GamesRadar+ complimented and defended Paladins about the similarities with Overwatch, declaring "Fast forward two years later, though, and Paladins is looking healthier than ever. Finally free from having to defend itself from those incessant comparisons, the game has come into its own as Hi-Rez Studios' fast paced development and eSports focused agenda has endowed it with an identity that stands apart from anything else on the market."

Eurogamer praised the Nintendo Switch version, saying "Paladins has a great chance to shine here, and shine it does" and that "Overall, there's a lot to respect in how Paladins is represented on Switch. Hi-Rez has accomplished one of the closest matches to the other versions available, crafting a 60fps title where online competition with Xbox One players feels balanced and fair." Pat Kerley of The Republic of Players gave a positive review, depicting the gameplay as "fluid and responsive", calling the game "very consumer friendly" about the micro-transactions and stating "Paladins Champions of the Realm is a must buy game".

PC Zone listed Paladins 2nd in their top "5 Best Free-to-Play Games on Steam in 2020", calling it "appealing". PlayStation LifeStyle listed the game in their top "7 Best PS4 Free-to-Play Games You Won’t Be Able to Stop Playing", indicating "This game gets a lot of flak for being called an Overwatch rip-off, but Paladins is better than that." CulturedVultures ranked Paladins 3rd in their list of the "20 Best Free Games on Steam", declaring "Paladins: Champions of the Realm offers what Overwatch does without any fees: glorious and fun team battles with gun-toting and magic-wielding characters, each with a background story, in well-designed maps". TheGamer ranked the game 9th in their list of "10 Free-to-Play Switch Games Actually Worth the Grind".

=== Controversies ===
In response to accusations that the game is an Overwatch clone, Hi-Rez COO Todd Harris said that “While Overwatch is a fine game, it was not the inspiration for Paladins. Game development is an interactive process with ideas coming from many past projects. For the hero shooter genre, the game that deserves the most credit is Team Fortress 2. We released a TF2 inspired class-based shooter called Global Agenda way back in 2010. Paladins was conceived as a fantasy version of Global Agenda and of the approximately 85 combat abilities currently in Paladins, the vast majority are from the game Global Agenda we made 10 years ago."

In 2018, Hi-Rez Studios CEO Stew Chisam pointed out the similarities between the Paladins champion Ash and Overwatch hero Brigitte, stating "If I happened to notice and point out any similarities between these two characters, would that make me the Pot calling the Kettle black, or the Kettle calling the Pot black? This will keep me up tonight unless I get a clear answer."

In an advertisement released in 2018, Paladins Strike used an artwork from Overwatch. Hi-Rez Studios's art director responded by stating "This art was created by a overseas partner studio for paladins strike and had not much in the way of oversight in its content creation by anyone internally at Hi-Rez. We will be looking into this immediately."

The loot boxes introduced in the game by an update were criticized by players, believing it could make the game too "pay-to-win". The game also received these allegations when it introduced a new in-game currency in a beta patch.

=== Awards ===
Year	Award	Category	Result	Ref.
2016	PAX West 2016–Best of Show Awards	Best MOBA or Battle Game	Won	
2016	Global Game Awards	Best Free to Play	Won	
2016	Steam Awards	'I Thought This Game Was Cool Before It Won An Award'	Nominated	
2018	YouTube Creator Awards	Gold Creator	Won	
2018	Golden Joystick Awards	Best Competitive Game	Nominated	
2018	Global Game Awards	Best Free to Play	Won	

== See also ==
- Realm Royale – a spin-off of Paladins
