= Global Agenda =

2010 video game

- Developer: Hi-Rez Studios
- Publisher: Hi-Rez Studios
- Designer: Scott Zier
- Programmers: Chris Larson; John Dew
- Artists: Bret Kroll; Charles Vinson; Daniel Lilleberg
- Writer: Nathan Knaack
- Composer: Chris Rickwood
- Engine: Unreal Engine 3
- Platform: Microsoft Windows
- Release: February 1, 2010
- Genres: Massively multiplayer online, third-person shooter, action role-playing
- Mode: Multiplayer

Global Agenda is a class-based shooter online team-based game by Hi-Rez Studios developed using Unreal Engine 3. Global Agenda was started in 2005 as the studio's first project. The game went live on February 1, 2010. In April 2011, Global Agenda was re-released as a free-to-play game. The game's servers were shut down in 2018 and reopened in 2022.

== Gameplay ==
The game features a third-person camera view, although some weapons allow scoping in a first-person view using a mouse action. Characters have jetpacks, as well as various weapon types, including melee. Global Agenda features a large degree of variability in player appearance with unique achievement-based flair items; almost all player items can be re-colored using dyes for additional personalization.

Global Agenda's lore and gameplay center around Dome City, which acts as an open world lobby. Players can explore and shop, and boosted players can use their jetpacks, but weapons and skills are disabled. Most of the game revolves around mercenary matches (PvP) or instances (PvE). There are two playable open world zones, the Sonoran Desert and North Sonora. Players can also take part in Agency vs Agency (AvA) which is Global Agenda's guild-centric competitive mode.

The game features four classes: Assault, Recon, Medic, and Robotics. All have customizable skill trees and their own weapons. Players can reset their skills at any time and at no cost while in Dome City. As a result, in order to have access to every specialization of every class, a player needs four characters, one for each class.

Global Agenda includes almost no randomness; the same hit from the same weapon under the same circumstances always does the same damage. All weapons with innate inaccuracy are fast firing, minimizing the impact of random bullet trajectory on gameplay. There are no critical hits and no headshots, not even with sniper rifles.

=== Mercenary Mode ===
For more casual games, players can enter the Mercenary queue. The game attempts to make two 10-player, skill-balanced teams based on each player's star rating. Players are then entered into a match whose mode is determined by that player's filters, if they have any. Global Agenda supports the following modes:

- Breach - One team defends three points, in succession, while the other attempts to capture them, in order. The attacking team wins if they capture all three points. The defending team wins if time runs out. Additional time is given after each capture.
- Scramble - A control point is placed on a random point on the map after each capture and both teams attempt to capture it first. Three captures (or the higher number in case of a deadlock) wins.
- Control - three control points are open on the map simultaneously. Whichever team has the majority of control points in control slowly gains match points. The first to reach 800 points wins.
- Payload - The attacking team attempts to push a bomb to the end of the track. The defending team attempts to halt or reverse their progress. The attacking team wins if the payload reaches the final point on the track. The defending team wins when time runs out.
- Acquisition - This is a tweak on capture the flag, except in this case, the flag is a robot. Once a robot is "activated" by a player stepping inside it, it can be both damaged and healed. It must be destroyed before it reaches the other side, or the enemy team scores. Three points (or higher in case of a deadlock) are needed to win.

=== Special Ops ===
For cooperative games, players can queue for Special Ops. Teams of 1-4 players can attempt to clear instances of enemy non-player characters. Players have 20 minutes to reach the instance boss, and then get at least four minutes to defeat it. There are four difficulties:

- Medium Security - The easiest difficulty available, these missions are canonically the first to have been undertaken by the Armed Revolutionary Militia and focus on the clearing of immediate threats to Dome City. Maps feature either Bandit bases or Recursive hives.
- High Security - This is the first mode where players fight the Commonwealth. It features high-tech labs and weapons manufacturing facilities. Players occasionally encounter enemy Elite Agents, which mirror the playable classes. Helots mirror Assaults, Assassins mirror Recons, Alchemists mirror Medics, and Techros mirror Robotics. Bosses are more difficult.
- Maximum Security - Patrol scanners start appearing in this difficulty. Their alarms spawn enemy reinforcements the first time they are tripped. Hunter Spiders, who can pull Agents from safety, start appearing. Additionally, there are more enemies, more Elite Agents, and more enemies spawn in the boss room.
- Ultra-Max Security - In the highest difficulty, minion Androids are replaced by more dangerous Minion Ballistae and Minion Sentinels. Enemy density is increased. There are larger groups of Elite Agents. Alarms summon reinforcements every time they are tripped, rather than only once. Guardians start appearing. The boss room starts with a significant number of Elite Agents and enemies.

=== Agency vs Agency ===
In Agency vs Agency (AvA), agencies compete for terrain on hex-based zones. There are three geographic regions supported, North America (NA), Europe (EU), and Pacific (PAC). Each geographic region has two zones, one for a weekday season and one for a weekend season. Weekday seasons have ten total days in the season, whereas weekend seasons have four. AvA is open in a zone during that geographic region's primetime hours.

Facilities can be bought or produced by agencies to be put onto each hex. Labs produce blueprints which are consumed when they are used. Mines produce materials needed by blueprints. Factories combine materials and blueprints to make usable items. Whenever something is produced, an agency gains Networth. After two weeks, the agency with the highest Networth wins the season. Agencies in the top three positions get rewards on top of what was produced during the season, such as the Black Lance Vandal and Dark Steel Vindicator. Players also receive holographic armor and dyes for coming in the top three or first for several seasons.

== Plot ==
Global Agenda mixes a science fiction setting with a secret agent backdrop, leading the developers to refer to the game genre as spy-fi.

The game is set in 2155, in the wake of a severe global disaster. An Orwellian government called the Commonwealth tyrannically rules Earth with an army of artificially intelligent drones. Earth's population is under one billion people and suffers from a shortage of habitable land. Advanced technology allows limited regions of Earth to be environmentally cleansed and habitable. As land becomes available there is intense competition to colonize the area and control that region's technology. This competition sets the stage for much of the game's campaign action.

The Recursive Colony update expanded on a threat of self-replicating machines called Recursives. Through exploration and investigation in the new North Sonoran desert zone, players learn of a massing of Recursive forces. The quest line leads into the hourly raids where Recursives attempt to break into and capture Dome City. The final mission allows as many players as desired to take part in an attempt to simultaneously destroy four objectives, thus disrupting the Recursive colony and (temporarily, at least), ending the Recursive threat.

Hi-Rez has released several pieces of fiction to establish the back-story as well as a timeline for what occurred in the Global Agenda universe before the game begins: Pre-Commonwealth and Post-Commonwealth.

== Development and release ==
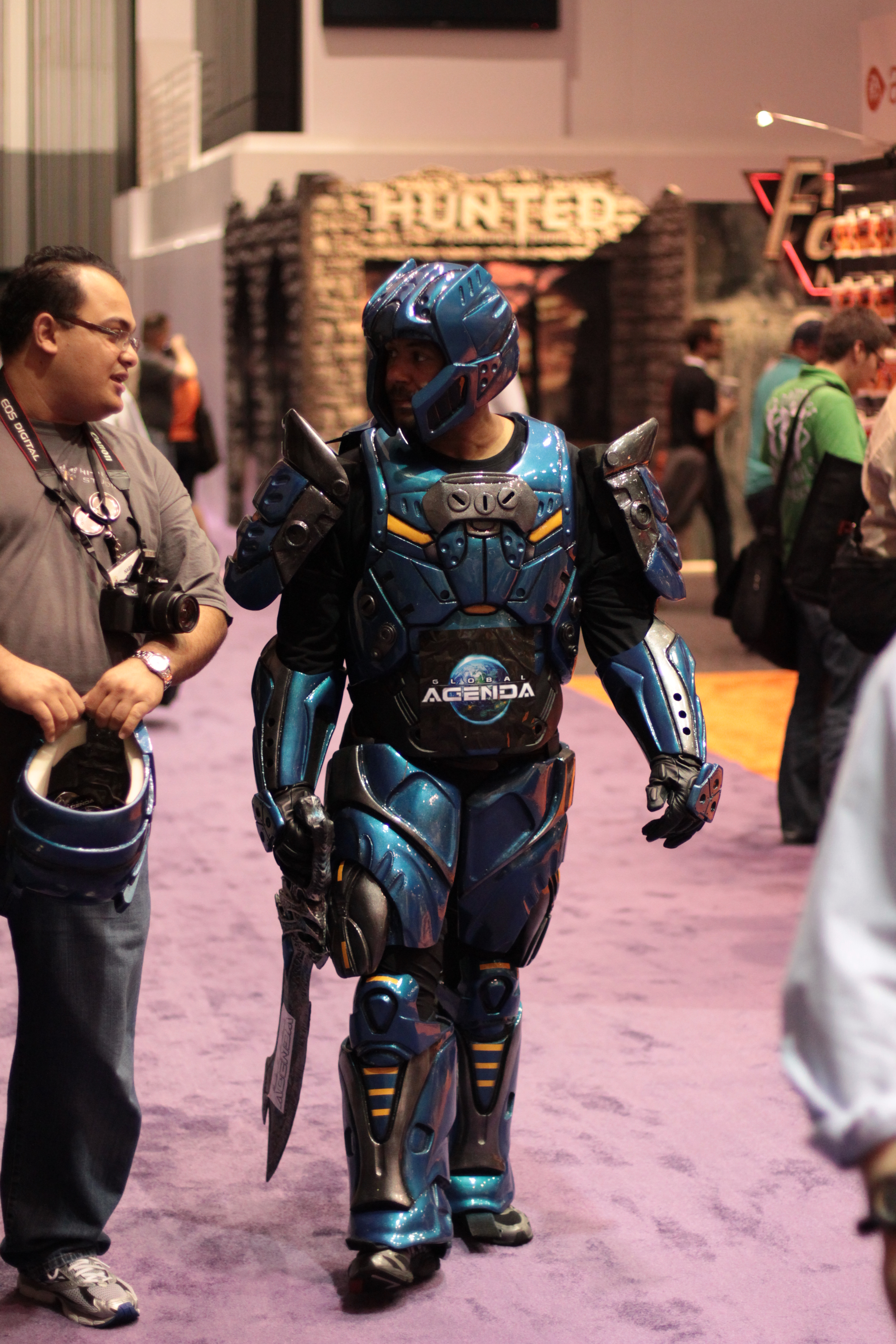
Promotion at E3 2010

Pricing for the North American version of Global Agenda was announced on October 20, 2009. The pricing model was said to reflect the games' positioning as a hybrid between a multiplayer, hub-based shooter and a larger-scale persistent world online shooter MMO. Pricing was initially planned to include an optional "Global Agenda: Conquest" subscription package.

As of June 25, 2010, Global Agenda announced that it was going subscription-free and all content that previously required a monthly subscription fee is available to all players who have purchased the game. Trial accounts do not receive these benefits. Global Agenda's trial accounts are for an unlimited amount of time but can only advance to a limited level.

On April 7, 2011, Hi-Rez Studios stated that the upcoming update would bring the game's subscription model to free-to-play.

== Expansions ==
=== Sandstorm ===
In Q2 2010, Hi-Rez released a Global Agenda expansion entitled Sandstorm. Sandstorm was released in two major phases: Phase One (1.3) included changes to weapons and armor, loot drops and an HA overhauled crafting system. and Phase Two (1.35) included the introduction of a new "Sonoran Desert" Open Zone, additional mission styles, including 10-person defense raids and Special Ops missions, Consumables and Salvage and an overhaul to the in-game credit and token system.

=== Free Agent ===
In April 2011, Hi-Rez released Free Agent highlighting a move to free-to-play, balance changes and the introduction of new end-game raid content, Dome Defense. Free Agent included the overhaul of skill trees to encourage role specialization. The Dome Defense raid pits teams of ten players against a more powerful threat to the Dome.

== Reception ==
Global Agenda achieved a 70% average from critics on Metacritic. IGN said that the game "hits the top notes in many areas. The crisp graphics and fast paced, high intensity team-based combat are definitely the game's strongest points" while also noting that players are best off finding an Agency (guild) to "suit your play style and personality, as it's all about teamwork and the people you play with". Eurogamer was more critical and said "a shooter without eloquence or crunch, an MMO without content or personality, and as an experimental combination of the two it's missing ambition".

== Sequel ==
On October 2, 2012, Hi-Rez announced on its forums that development had started on Global Agenda 2. According to the post, the sequel will focus more on PvP and use a lot of assets from the original Global Agenda. It will add maps, game modes, class weapons, and be built on Hi-Rez's newest platform. Beta testing was expected to begin in mid-2013.

In an interview with Joystiq, Hi-Rez COO Todd Harris said of Global Agenda 2, "No open world elements planned", and "No plan for hex-maps or facility building". He mentioned that players of the original Global Agenda and other Hi-Rez games will be given priority beta access.

In a response to an open letter to Hi-Rez, Harris said that as of July 2013, Hi-Rez planned to focus on Smite for the next six months, before focusing on Global Agenda 2.

In September 2014, several leaks of Global Agenda 2 came to light, which revealed that the game would be provisionally called Global Assault, there was also a list of weapons and skills that would be used in the game, it was mentioned that the game would no longer use a class system, but would now be characters that could be modified before joining the game.

Later the game became a new franchise instead of a sequel, Global Agenda 2 became what is currently known as Paladins.
