= Rogue Company =

2022 free-to-play third-person shooter video game

- Developer: Evil Mojo Games
- Publisher: Hi-Rez Studios
- Composer: Run the Jewels
- Engine: Unreal Engine 4
- Platforms: Microsoft Windows; Nintendo Switch (Note: Until June 20, 2023); PlayStation 4; Xbox One; Xbox Series X/S; PlayStation 5; iOS; Android
- Release: June 9, 2022; iOS, Android; TBA
- Genres: Third-person shooter, tactical shooter, hero shooter
- Mode: Multiplayer

Rogue Company is a free-to-play multiplayer tactical third-person hero shooter video game developed by First Watch Games and published by Hi-Rez Studios. The game was released in open beta on October 1, 2020 for Microsoft Windows via the Epic Games Store, Steam, Xbox One, PlayStation 4, Nintendo Switch, with an Xbox Series X/S release following on November 25, 2020, and a PlayStation 5 release on March 30, 2021. The game features full support for cross-platform play and cross-progression. The game takes inspiration from the Counter-Strike series of tactical shooters. The game came out of beta on June 9, 2022.

The Nintendo Switch version of the game shut down on June 20, 2023.

== Gameplay ==
Rogue Company features a range of playable characters, referred to as Rogues. There are 26 playable Rogues in Rogue Company. The game features objective-based game modes and various maps. Matches consist of multiple rounds, with each round usually beginning with both teams skydiving from aircraft to the map below to compete against each other in various objectives. Between rounds players may use money earned from completing tasks and eliminating players in the previous round to buy and upgrade weapons, equipment and perks.

A number of game modes have been revealed: Extraction is a 4v4 game mode, where the attacking team is tasked with hacking an objective; the winner of a round is determined once the objective is hacked or all players on a team have been eliminated. Strikeout is a variation of Extraction in which players are able to respawn after being eliminated, with each team having a limited number of respawns each round. In this mode, victory must be achieved via killing enemies until they have no respawns left. This can be more easily achieved by hacking the objective, an area rather than a box. Demolition is a 4v4 mode in which one team must plant a bomb within a time limit. Wingman is a 2v2 game mode, basically the game mode Strikeout but with less respawns and teams of two.

== Development ==
Rogue Company was announced on September 5, 2019. Following the initial video announcement, it was revealed that Rogue Company would be an Epic Games Store exclusive on PC. On November 15, 2019, First Watch Games released a insights video highlighting various aspects of the game and members of the development team. A number of Rogues were announced for Rogue Company prior to release, including Anvil, who can place down a barricade, Lancer, an assassin who can silence her footsteps, Gl1tch, who can detect nearby enemy equipment, Chaac (originally Phoenix), who wields a personal Stim Pack, and Trench, who places down barbed wire traps that slow enemies and disable their dodges.

After a limited public alpha testing phase, the game entered an early access closed beta phase on July 20, 2020 ahead of its intended wide release later in 2020, with players gaining access by purchasing a Founder's Pack or receiving an invite code. During the beta, the game attracted two million players.

In September 2020, Hi-Rez collaborated with 100 Thieves to add a collection of 100 Thieves-branded character outfits and weapon skins into Rogue Company. In October 2020, Dr Disrespect worked with Hi-Rez to add a custom map, designed by Dr Disrespect, and a Dr Disrespect character skin. In July 2024, all Dr Disrespect content was removed from the game following the revelation that he had communicated inappropriately with a minor in 2017. Also in October 2020, Hi-Rez reported that Rogue Company hit 8 million players.

The game's main menu music was composed by Run the Jewels.

As of August 2026, the game remains in its as is state with its last major update being 3.5 released on November 20th 2023, right after the game was put upon the shoulders of EvilMojo Games, which promised more updates.

== Reception ==
Reception

Aggregate score
Aggregator	Score
Metacritic	PC: 75/100

Review scores
Publication	Score
IGN	7/10
Nintendo Life	7/10

The Windows version of Rogue Company received "generally favorable reviews" from critics, according to review aggregator Metacritic.

Various journalists were able to play an alpha version of the game at DreamHack Atlanta in November 2019. Philippa Warr described the game to PC Gamer as "Hi-Rez's grungy take on a co-op PVP shooter". Rectify Gaming stated, "Fully aware of the game still in the alpha phase of development, the build was an impressive show nonetheless."

Gamereactor rated the game 7/10, saying "The title has simple enough mechanics, tight, great feeling gunplay and characters unique enough to keep the gameplay feeling fresh. Sure, it isn't without its flaws, but for a title that is looking to be around for the long run, Rogue Company is definitely showing early signs of what could be greatness". Screen Rant gave the game 3/5 stars, indicating "Rogue Company has grown into a fun third-person shooter that's fun with the right group, but it's not one that will hook players for the long haul". PC Gamer praised the playable characters and the game mechanics, stating "The carefree and casual nature of Rogue Company is a nice palette cleanser from more tense, tactical FPSes". Zack Zwiezen of Kotaku compared the game to Rainbow Six Siege and Fortnite, calling it "fine" and indicating "While Rogue Company isn't very remarkable or exciting, it is genuinely well made".

In December 2020, the studio announced that the game reached 15 million players.
