= Realm Royale =

2018 video game

Realm Royale Reforged
- Developer: Heroic Leap Games
- Publisher: Hi-Rez Studios
- Engine: Unreal Engine 3
- Platforms: Microsoft Windows; PlayStation 4; PlayStation 5; Xbox One; Xbox Series X/S; Nintendo Switch
- Release: Microsoft Windows; June 5, 2018; PlayStation 4, Xbox One; January 22, 2019; Nintendo Switch; May 24, 2019
- Genres: Battle royale, third-person shooter
- Mode: Multiplayer

Realm Royale was a free-to-play third-person shooter battle royale game developed by Heroic Leap Games and published by Hi-Rez Studios. The game featured multiple character classes each with unique abilities. It is a spin-off of the hero shooter Paladins, where it originated as a game mode known as "Battlegrounds".

The game was released for Microsoft Windows via Steam's early access program in June 2018, with versions for PlayStation 4 and Xbox One released two months later. Realm Royale entered open beta on PS4 and Xbox One on January 22, 2019. On May 24, 2019, the game entered closed beta on Nintendo Switch and went into open beta on June 20, 2019. On August 22, 2022, the game was updated as Realm Royale Reforged, marking the first update to the game since February 2020. On October 18, 2024, Hi-Rez Studios subsidiary Evil Mojo Games, through a post on Steam, announced that the game's servers would be shut down on February 17, 2025.

== Gameplay ==
The game plays similarly to other games in the Battle Royale genre, in which 100 players drop down from an airship and must traverse a shrinking safe area, collect equipment such as weapons and abilities to fight and eliminate opponents, and aim to be the last remaining player. In the Trios mode, players are grouped into teams of three against up to 74 players. The game also includes Realm Wars, a 10 versus 10 team deathmatch mode on a separate map named Primal Island, as well as an upcoming 40-player mini battle royale mode, also on a separate map. A crafting system allows found items to be disenchanted for shards to craft better items or abilities at fixed locations found on the map, called Forges, which often become contested by many players. Players who have been "knocked down" by other players are transformed into a chicken, and may be transformed back if they manage to survive attackers for a period of time, during which "chickened" players have the option to deal small amounts of damage in the form of short-range melee attacks. The game includes a battle pass that rewards players with character and menu cosmetics. There are five classes, with each class having specific "talents" that can be earned by leveling up.

== Development ==
The game was developed and marketed by Hi-Rez Studios, which are known for multiplayer online battle arena games such as Paladins and Smite.

Initially, the game was intended as a separate game mode for the game Paladins, but was later developed into a separate offshoot, which was initially called Paladins: Battlegrounds and is now Realm Royale. The game was released for free on June 5, 2018, for Windows as part of the Steam Early Access program. A version for PlayStation 4 and Xbox One was also released.

In February 2020, the "Deviled Eggs" (also known as "OB23") update was released, after which no update was released for the next 2 years. Throughout 2022, some teasers were released indicating an upcoming update to Realm Royale. In July 2022, Realm Royale Reforged was released on test servers, with the full version releasing a month later. Realm Royale Reforged was maintained by a team of two developers working under Hi-Rez Studios, with occasional help from Evil Mojo Games, who develop Paladins.

== Reception ==
=== Pre-release reception ===
Realm Royale received generally favorable reviews from critics.

Reception

Aggregate score
Aggregator	Score
Metacritic	N/A

Review scores
Publication	Score
IGN	7,8/10
Jeuxvideo.com	14/20
Nintendo Life	7/10

Realm Royale's visual style and gameplay have drawn comparisons with the MMORPG World of Warcraft. Alex Avard of GamesRadar+ likened the game's classes to "the early days of World of Warcraft's PvP, in all the right ways." Jordan Forward of PCGamesN named the Forge as a key addition that a real sense of direction to the early and mid-game of Realm Royale". Due to the game principle, such as the character class system, Realm Royale is also compared with Fortnite and Overwatch. Some critics are also of the opinion that, in contrast to Fortnite, the game is not overwhelmed with the many and hectic construction functions and the game runs faster overall than in PlayerUnknown's Battlegrounds and other comparable titles. Furthermore, the combination of multiplayer online battle arena or hero shooter and battle royale is praised. GamesRadar+ inducted the game in their top "Free PS4 games: The best titles you can download without paying a thing". TheGamer listed Realm Royale in their top "Best Battle Royale Games For Newbies" praised the various magical abilities, indicating "Making every battle with players sometimes feel much different from the last". Trusted Reviews integrated the game in their "Best Battle Royale Games 2020", calling it "fun" and saying "Some questionable development decisions meant the game declined in popularity almost as quickly as it rose but that doesn't mean it's not good. Give this a chance".

=== Audience reception ===
More than 100,000 players played the game in the first week after it was released on Steam, making it the fourth most played game on Steam. The game gained fame among other things through live streams on sites like Twitch. After three weeks the game has reached over 3 million players and was number one of the most watched games on Twitch and Mixer. In July 2018, the game reached 4 million players. The game was the 4th most-downloaded free-to-play game on the PlayStation Store in the US and the 5th in Europe in 2019. On July 2, 2019, Hi-Rez Studios announced that Realm Royale reached 10 million players.

== Awards ==
Year	Award	Category	Results	Ref.
2018	Gamers' Choice Awards	Fan Favorite Battle Royale Game	Nominated	
2018	MMO Huts-Best F2P Games 2018	Best New Battle Royale	Won	
