= Roccat =

German computer accessories manufacturer

Roccat GmbH
- Type: Private
- Industry: PC accessories
- Founded: 2006; 20 years ago
- Founder: René Korte
- Defunct: 2024
- Fate: Acquired (2019) and merged (2024) by Turtle Beach
- Headquarters: Hamburg, Germany
- Area served: Worldwide
- Products: See § Products
- Number of employees: c. 110 (2016)
- Parent: Turtle Beach
- Website: Official website (archived)

Roccat GmbH was a German computer accessories manufacturer based in Hamburg. It was also the titular sponsor of former German professional esports organization Team ROCCAT.

In 2019, the assets of the Roccat brand were acquired by Turtle Beach Corporation. The brand was discontinued in 2024, with many of its product lines transitioning under the Turtle Beach brand.

== History ==
Roccat GmbH was founded in 2006 by former Razer Vice President of Europe, René Korte, in Hamburg, Germany. Roccat also had offices in Taipei, Taiwan, and Cerritos, Los Angeles, United States.

In 2019, the assets of the Roccat brand were acquired by Turtle Beach Corporation for 19.2 million US dollars. Roccat was used as Turtle Beach's PC brand. It had a turnover in the double-digit million range in 2018 and had around 110 employees in 2016. In 2021, Roccat launched a product line in cooperation with the American livestreamer Dr Disrespect. Turtle Beach announced in April 2024 that the Roccat brand was being retired, with many of its product lines transitioning under the Turtle Beach brand.

== Products ==
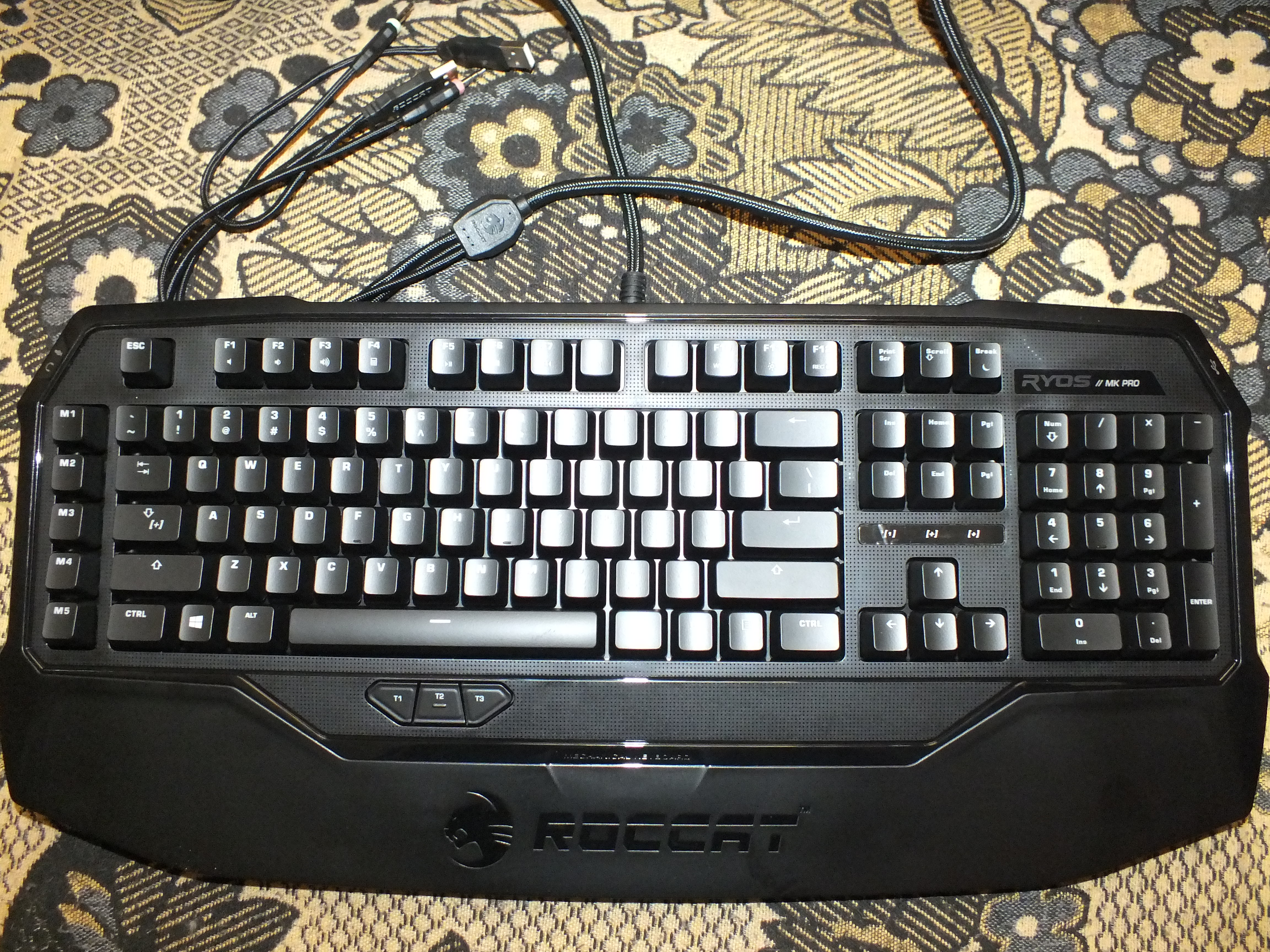
Roccat Ryos MK Pro, the company's flagship mechanical gaming keyboard from 2013

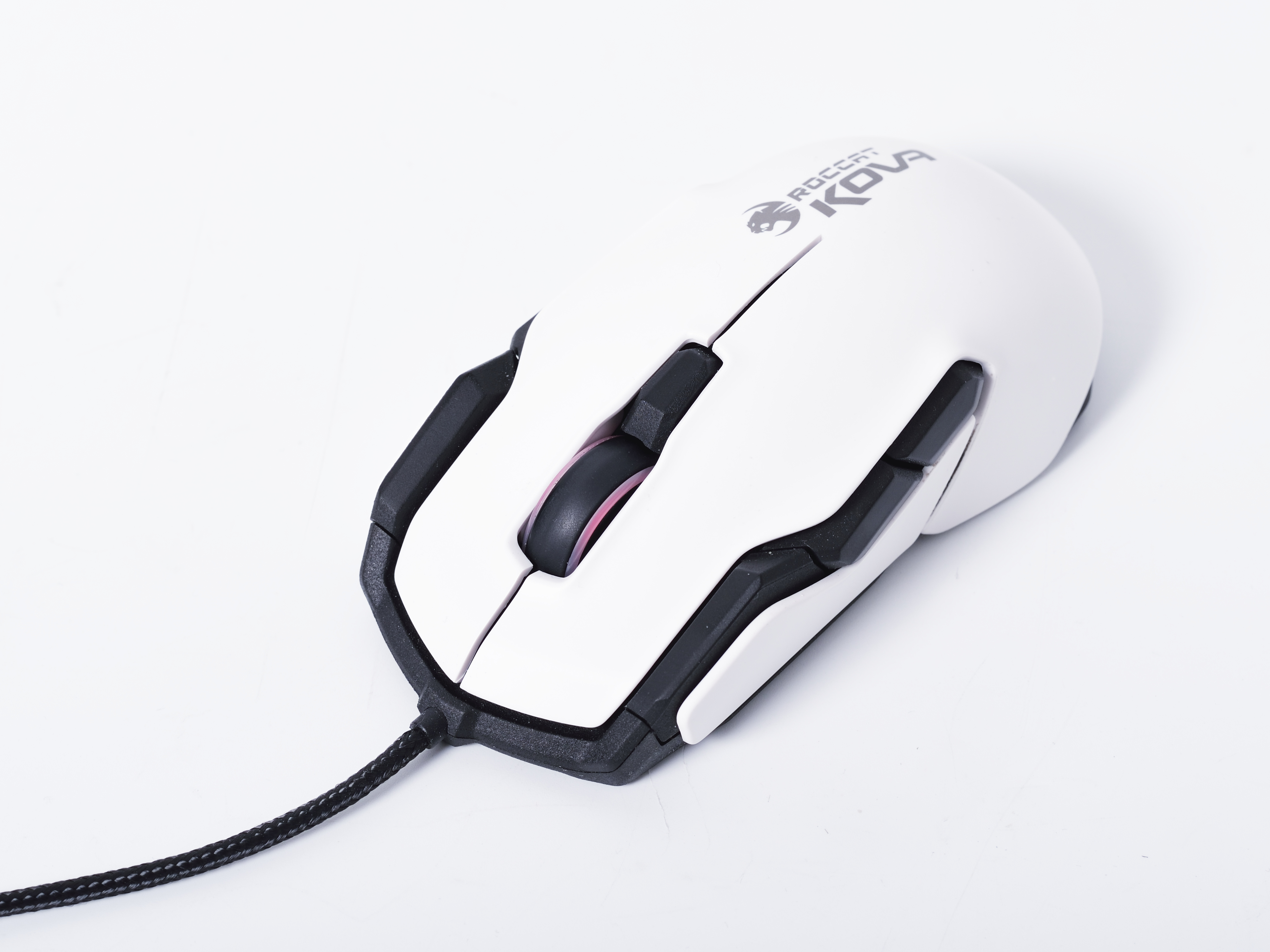
Roccat Kova gaming mouse from 2015, based on an eponymous mouse from 2009

Roccat was dedicated to gaming hardware and offered various products like mice, keyboards, headsets, mouse pads, external microphones, and other PC accessories. The Vulcan line was Roccat's flagship series of keyboards. For the series, Roccat developed its own switches called Titan Switch Optical in cooperation with TTC. A beam of light that hits an optical signal when a button is pressed and thereby records an input replaces the conventional physical contact within a button. According to the manufacturer, the response time of keystrokes should be registered 40 times faster and instead of 50 million clicks, up to 100 million clicks should be possible compared to conventional mechanical keyboards.

Several features and functions of Roccat products, such as RGB lighting, scroll speed, polling rate, DPI and key profiles, can be set using the free Roccat Swarm software. After Roccat was discontinued in 2024 and merged by Turtle Beach, the software was succeeded by Turtle Beach Swarm II, which also supports some Roccat products.

== Reception ==
Roccat „[...] gehört zu den 10 meistverkauften Gaming-Peripheriemarken in Europa und ist laut jüngster Newzoo Verbraucherumfragen eine der vier führenden Marken in Bezug auf Bekanntheit, Kaufverhalten und Präferenz für Gaming-Tastaturen und -Mäuse im deutschen PC-Gaming-Markt“ ([...] belongs to the 10 best-selling gaming peripheral brands in Europe and, according to the latest Newzoo consumer surveys, is one of the four leading brands in terms of awareness, buying behavior and preference for gaming keyboards and mice in the German PC gaming market [...]".

According to German IT news online magazine Golem.de, Roccat „[...] gilt für den Käufer als hochwertig und renommiert“ ("[...] is considered high quality and renowned for the buyer").

Roccat's Vulcan keyboard series „[...] hat sich [...] eine Vielzahl redaktioneller Auszeichnungen und hohes Lob von den Spielern gesichert“ ([...] has garnered numerous editorial awards and high praise from gamers").

In 2016, Roccat was awarded the Deutscher Gründerpreis (German Founders Award) in the category Aufsteiger (newcomer).
