= Turtle Beach Corporation =

Gaming accessory manufacturer

- Type: Public
- Traded as: Nasdaq: TBCH; Russell 2000 component
- Industry: Consumer electronics; Gaming accessories
- Genre: Gaming
- Founded: 1975; 51 years ago in Queens, New York
- Founders: Carmine Bonanno, Fred Romano, Robert Hoke; Roy Smith
- Headquarters: San Diego, California, U.S.
- Key people: Terry Jimenez (chairman); Cris Keirn(CEO); Mark Weinswig (CFO)
- Products: Gaming headsets, game controllers, gaming keyboards, flight simulation, race simulation
- Revenue: ▼$234.7 million (2019) ▲$287.4 million (2018)
- Net income: $235,000,000 USD
- Subsidiaries: Roccat, Neat Microphones, Performance Designed Products, Victrix
- Website: www.turtlebeach.com

Turtle Beach Corporation, doing business as Turtle Beach, is an American gaming accessory manufacturer based in San Diego, California. The company has roots dating back to the 1970s where it developed sound cards, MIDI synthesizers, and various audio software packages and network audio devices. The company began making gaming headsets in 2005.

== History ==
=== Early history: 1975–2005 ===
Turtle Beach Corp. has roots dating back to 1975, founded by Carmine Bonanno in Queens, New York, as Octave Electronics, later becoming Octave-Plateau and then Voyetra Technologies. Turtle Beach began as "Turtle Beach Softworks", founded in 1985 by Roy Smith and Robert Hoke.

Octave was known for the Cat Synthesizer, designed by Carmine and released in 1976. In 1979 it became Octave Plateau and was known for the Voyetra Eight Synthesizer, also designed by Carmine. It also pioneered Music Software for the IBM PC and created one of the first music sequencer programs, called Sequencer Plus. In 1986, the company changed its name to Voyetra Technologies, exited the synthesizer business and concentrated on music software. Voyetra Technologies was one of the original companies included in the MIDI standard, and had developed drivers and software for nearly every sound card manufacturer in the world during the early 1990s. In 1996, Voyetra Technologies acquired Turtle Beach Systems, changed its name to Voyetra Turtle Beach and focused primarily on sound cards and music composition software.

Turtle Beach System's first product was a graphical editing system that supported the breakthrough Ensoniq Mirage sampling keyboard. The Mirage was the first low-cost sampling device that allowed musicians to play realistic choirs, pianos, horns, and other instruments in their performances. The software, called "Vision", connected the Mirage to a PC and used the PC's screen and graphics to make the programming and editing of sounds much easier. Ensoniq decided to resell Vision through its dealer network and Turtle Beach Softworks became a profitable company.

In 1988, Turtle Beach Systems began to work on developing its first hardware product, a hard-disk-based audio editing system. Among the first of its kind, the product was named the "56K digital recording system" and was released in 1990. In 1990, Turtle Beach began developing its second PC sound card. This card used high quality A/D and D/A, a high quality synthesizer from eMu, and an onboard DSP chip. This product was called "MultiSound." The MultiSound product competed with more established products of the day from Advanced Gravis (now defunct), Ad Lib, Inc. (now defunct), Creative Labs, and Media Vision. CCRMA's Music Kit and DSP Tools running on Motorola 56001 DSP, initially developed for NeXTcube system, was later ported on NeXTSTEP with Turtle Beach Fiji/Pinnacle DSP cards.

In December 1996, Turtle Beach Systems was sold by Integrated Circuit Systems to Voyetra Technologies in Yonkers, New York. The new combined company changed its name to Voyetra Turtle Beach, led by CEO Carmine Bonanno. As Voyetra Turtle Beach, the company sold millions of sound cards to Dell and other major PC manufacturers in the late 1990s and early 2000s.

=== 2005–2013: Rebranding as a headset manufacturer ===
In 2005, the company released its first Ear Force gaming headset model, the AXP. The headset was geared toward computer gamers. Over the following years, the company began focusing primarily on its lines of PC and console gaming headsets, steering away from sound cards almost completely (it did release updated versions of the Audio Advantage USB sound cards in 2010). By 2007, Voyetra Turtle Beach had released several headset models including those that were wireless and those that had surround sound capability. Its models were initially designed specifically for the Xbox 360, PC, or Wii. Turtle Beach released its first pair of headphones designed specifically for the PlayStation 3 (Ear Force P21) in 2009.

In October 2010, Stripes Group acquired a majority position in Turtle Beach. In 2011, the company released a limited-edition, officially licensed Call of Duty: Modern Warfare 3 headset. In 2012, it entered into a partnership with Major League Gaming (MLG) that saw the release of headsets specifically designed for tournament gaming and consumer headsets that had official MLG branding. The same year, Turtle Beach acquired Lygo International, a United Kingdom-based distributor and supplier of gaming accessories that had already been Turtle Beach's exclusive distributor and support center for the UK and Ireland since January 2011.

=== Since 2013: Parametric merger and eSports sponsorships ===
In 2013, Turtle Beach began working on a deal that would eventually see them merge with the San Diego-based audio technology manufacturer, Parametric Sound Corporation, in January 2014. Parametric had gone public in 2010. In April 2014, the company's name was changed to Turtle Beach Corporation, it began trading under the stock ticker symbol "HEAR," and opened a new corporate headquarters in San Diego, California. Parametric's "UltraSound" technology, which uses speakers to direct sounds only to specific areas, also came under the purview of Turtle Beach.

In 2014 and 2015, the company released official Titanfall and Star Wars Battlefront-branded headsets. It also began releasing a collection of other gaming accessories like keyboards, computer mice, and mousepads. In 2016, the company entered a partnership with OpTic Gaming, an esports organization, for the team to use its Elite Pro Tournament Gaming Headset. Turtle Beach also released the Stream Mic for users who broadcast from their consoles and PC. In 2017, it released the first headsets (the Stealth 600 and 700) that could connect directly to the Xbox One console wirelessly. The Stealth 600 went on to be the best-selling Xbox One gaming headset for 2018. It also entered into a console-only sponsorship deal with Splyce.

In 2018, the company launched a new line of PC-specific headsets called "Atlas." It received input and feedback from esports teams, OpTic Gaming and Astralis, during the design process. It also released the Elite Pro 2 headset designed for console gaming. In December 2018, it released a line of earbuds ("Battle Buds") designed for mobile gaming.

In 2019, Turtle Beach bought Hamburg-based company Roccat GmbH for 19.2 million US dollars. Roccat "[...] belongs to the 10 best-selling gaming peripheral brands in Europe and, according to the latest Newzoo consumer surveys, is one of the four leading brands in terms of awareness, buying behavior and preference for gaming keyboards and mice in the German PC gaming market [...]". In 2020, Roccat represented Turtle Beach's PC branch, but in 2024 Turtle Beach retired the brand entirely.

Turtle Beach acquired Performance Designed Products (PDP), a controller manufacturer, for $118 million on March 13, 2024.

== Products and brands ==
=== VelocityOne ===
VelocityOne is the brand name for Turtle Beach's simulator controllers for flight simulators and racing simulators. It initially released flight simulator equipment and in 2024 released the VelocityOne Race for racing.

=== Headsets ===
Turtle Beach creates gaming headsets for devices such as the Xbox One, Xbox Series X/S, PlayStation 4, PlayStation 5, Wii U, Nintendo Switch, Nintendo Switch 2, PC, mobile and tablet devices. It is considered one of the leading gaming audio brands.

Gaming headsets have been Turtle Beach's primary product offering since around 2005. It initially began releasing headsets for PCs and consoles of that generation including the Xbox 360, Wii, and the PlayStation 3. The early models were often given the Ear Force branding with a letter or number designation to differentiate between consoles (e.g. headsets for the Xbox 360 were a part of the "Ear Force X" series while those for the PlayStation 3 were part of the "Ear Force P" series).

Turtle Beach headsets are generally cross-compatible between then and current-generation consoles like the Xbox One, Xbox Series X/S, PlayStation 4, PlayStation 5, Wii U, Nintendo Switch, Nintendo Switch 2, and PCs, as well as most mobile and tablet devices. Many models are console-specific, but share the same branding and can often be used across platforms (e.g. the Stealth 300 has a model for both the Xbox One and the PlayStation 4, but both are technically compatible with one another and the Nintendo Switch, and PC, etc.). Certain features on console-specific models may not transfer from one platform to another. For instance, the Stealth 600 and 700 models for the Xbox One can wirelessly connect directly with the console. Those same models for the PlayStation 4 do not have that feature. In some cases, the differences between one console-specific model and another are cosmetic.

As of 2018, Turtle Beach sells a number of wired and wireless headsets under several different families. These include: Elite (Elite Pro 2 + SuperAmp, Elite SuperAmp, Elite Pro Tournament Gaming Headset, Elite 800,); Stealth (Stealth 700, Stealth 600, Stealth 350VR, Stealth 300); Recon (Recon 200, Recon Camo, Recon 150, Recon 50, Recon Chat); Atlas (Elite Atlas, Atlas Three, Atlas One); and there are also standalone products, including the Stream Mic and Battle Buds. Recon products are generally entry-level and offer great game sound and microphone performance to better immerse players in their game and to allow them to communicate with other online players. Stealth products add premium features like wireless connectivity, surround sound, larger speakers, memory foam, etc. Elite series models are generally considered professional level and/or high-end gaming headsets.

The Atlas series of headsets was designed specifically for use in PC gaming. The newest series, Battle Buds, is a set of gaming earbuds designed to be compatible with mobile devices along with PCs and all consoles.

=== Sound cards and software ===
Turtle Beach has also developed sound cards, MIDI synthesizers, and various audio software packages and network audio devices.

In 1988, Turtle Beach developed its first product, a hard-disk-based audio editing system. The product was named the "56K digital recording system" and was released in 1990 and was considered the first of its kind. Its card, 56K-PC, was based on a Motorola 56000 DSP chip, and offered non linear playlist editing of stereo audio files. The 56K system was popular among radio stations and mastering studios because it replayed exactly the same digital stream that it recorded.

The company has also developed a few other programs that supported Ensoniq equipment. During its time as Voyetra Turtle Beach, it leveraged Voyetra's close ties with PC manufacturers by providing sound cards bundled with Voyetra software and drivers. It sold millions of sound cards to Dell Computer under the Turtle Beach brand.

In 2001, Voyetra Turtle Beach developed AudioTron, one of the first standalone Internet audio receivers. The device enjoyed considerable success in the first year of its release, but was soon faced with tremendous competition from similar products. Turtle Beach opted out of the network audio market in 2004.

== See also ==
- Aureal Semiconductor
- Auzentech
- Creative Labs
- E-mu Systems
- Ensoniq Corporation
- Roland Corporation
- Sensaura
- Yamaha Corporation
