= Anti-Cheat Expert =

Product to detect cheating in games

- Developer: Tencent
- Release: 2005
- Operating system: Windows, macOS, Linux
- Platform: Windows, Linux
- Type: Anti-cheat software
- License: Proprietary

Anti-Cheat Expert (ACE) is a game security product created by Chinese tech conglomerate Tencent, designed for both PC games and mobile games.

ACE was initially released as an antibot for Free Fantasy Online in 2005. Since then, ACE has also collaborated with multiple games such as Honor of Kings, Game for Peace and Arena Breakout.

Anti-Cheat Expert is a member of the Fair Play Alliance.

== History ==
In 2021, its current name Anti-Cheat Expert was announced. In March 2022, ACE participated in the Game Developers Conference (GDC) for the first time. In August 2023, ACE participated in the Gamescom for the first time.

In April 2024, ACE was interviewed by the Korea Economic Daily to discuss "how artificial intelligence can advance game security technology". ACE entered into a partnership agreement with Cathedral Studios, offering anti-cheat protection for their game, The Bornless. ACE participated at Gamescom again in 2024.

== Controversy ==
Anti-Cheat Expert has faced criticism for its use of kernel-level access in its anti-cheat technology. Kernel-level access grants the software the highest level of control over a user's system, which has raised significant security and privacy concerns among critics and cybersecurity experts. Critics argue that this level of access increases the risk of data misuse and security vulnerabilities.

Despite these concerns, ACE is widely used across numerous games, including Delta Force and Honor of Kings, where it provides security solutions to combat cheating and improve fair play.

It's been reported that most games using Anti-Cheat Expert blocks Desktop Linux from running the game through the Proton compatibility layer, but allows the Steam Deck. However, there are some games that have been reported to be working on regular Linux systems too.

== Games using Anti-Cheat Expert ==
- Arena Breakout: Infinite
- Arknights: Endfield
- The Bornless
- Free Fantasy Online
- Goddess of Victory: Nikke
- Honor of Kings
- Call of Duty: Mobile
- Arena of Valor
- Dragon Raja
- Strinova
- Dungeonborne
- Delta Force
- Infinity Nikki
- Mecha Break
- Wuthering Waves
- Blue Protocol: Star Resonance
- Last War: Survival Game
- Punishing: Gray Raven
- Neverness to Everness
