= The Bird That Drinks Blood =

2005 fantasy novel series by Lee Youngdo

The Bird That Drinks Blood 피를 마시는 새
- Author: Lee Youngdo
- Original title: 피를 마시는 새
- Language: Korean
- Genre: Fantasy novel
- Publisher: Golden Bough
- Publication date: 2005
- Publication place: South Korea
- Media type: Print (Hardback, 8 volumes)
- ISBN: 89-8273-931-9
- Preceded by: The Bird That Drinks Tears

The Bird That Drinks Blood (Korean: 피를 마시는 새; RR: Pireul masineun sae, abbreviated as 피마새; Pimasae) is a series of epic high fantasy novels by the South Korean author Lee Youngdo, set in the world of Lee's The Bird That Drinks Tears inhabited by four major races; humans; the powerful bird-like Rekon; the flame-wielding Tokkebi, and the reptilian Nhaga, who relinquish their hearts for immortality. The story takes place in the newly formed Arazi Empire, some 50 years after the events of the previous series.

As in The Bird That Drinks Tears, Lee continues to integrate elements of Korean folklore, history, and Old Korean languages. The ancient language of Arajit is modeled after Proto-Korean, and the Empire's ranks and offices reflect systems from the Silla and Goryeo dynasties. Cultural details include main characters playing baduk and its terms reflected in chapter titles, as well as references to traditional games such as ssireum and yunnori.

== Plot ==
The story unfolds during the reign of the emperor Chicheonje (치천제, Heaven Emperor) in the Neo Arajit Empire, a state ruled from the flying capital Haneulluri(하늘누리, Sky World). The narrative depicts clashes between absolute power and free will , focusing on several key characters whose intertwined fates shape the unfolding conflict: Elsi, the Empire's general-in-chief and Count of Kalido; Jeongu, the daughter of the Margrave of Gyuriha and a human raised among Tokebi; Jimen, a Rekon warrior sworn to assassinate the emperor; and Asil, a one-eyed human girl who, alongside Jimen, seeks revenge after the emperor crushed the Rekons' bid for an independent nation. Central to these events is the emperor Chicheonje herself, a Nhaga sovereign whose absolute rule and machinations have plunged the Empire into strife despite an outward appearance of order.

The plot begins as Asil and Jimen, who both harbor deep resentment after their failed independence movement was brutally suppressed six years earlier, plan to assassinate the emperor. Meanwhile, Elsi, a decorated war hero and the Empire's commander-in-chief, leads a campaign to subdue Gyuriha, whose leaders insist on maintaining the feudal tradition of swearing direct oaths of loyalty to the emperor, in contrast to the emperor's demand for unconditional loyalty to the Empire. (Note: The Bird That Drinks Blood, ch. 1 "Ambers Asleep"; Korean: 잠든 불씨)")

== Publishing ==
=== Serialization ===
As Lee's previous novels, such as Dragon Raja (1998) and The Bird That Drinks Tears(2002), The Bird That Drinks Blood was also serialised on a text-only online service Hitel's serial forum, "from the Christmas of 2003 to Christmas of 2004, exactly a year." It is the last of Lee's works to be on the forum before Hitel's closure in 2007. As of August 2011, it is his longest work to date.

=== Publication ===
Golden Bough, an imprint of Minumsa Publishing Group, has been Lee's publisher since 1998, and also runs an online community site for the fans of Lee's works. After The Bird That Drinks Blood was completed, in January 2005 the publisher called for volunteer "reader editors" at the website, to come meet the author at the publisher's office where they could talk about their requests and ideas about how the book should be printed. The Bird That Drinks Blood was published in July 2005 in 8 hardcover volumes. Each volume's title is as follows:

- Volume 1: The Emperor Hunter (Korean: 황제 사냥꾼)
- Volume 2: The General-in-Chief of the Empire (Korean: 제국의 대장군)
- Volume 3: The Ruler of the Bloodshed (Korean: 유혈의 지배자)
- Volume 4: The One That Wields Fire (Korean: 불을 휘두르는 자)
- Volume 5: The Master of Balkene (Korean: 발케네의 주인)
- Volume 6: The Rekon That Walks in the Rain (Korean: 빗속을 걷는 레콘)
- Volume 7: The One That Burns Self(Korean: 자신을 태우는 자)
- Volume 8: The One That Treads on The Sky (Korean: 하늘을 딛는 자)

In March 2024, the publisher Golden Bough announced that a full-cast audiobook adaptation of The Bird That Drinks Blood was in production, scheduled to be released in 2026. As part of the project, eleven fans of author Lee Youngdo were invited to participate in recording group sounds for scenes requiring collective voices.

In June 2025, the publisher Golden Bough published a special 20th anniversary illustrated edition, featuring 62 artworks by Seongmin Baek known for his Korean painting style graphic novels. along with a new map, character lists, and a limited set including a miniature baduk board set with the Big Dipper and southern six stars patterns.

== Critical response ==
The series features constructed languages and fictitious geography, vegetation, and history that spans several thousand years, drawing parallels to the worldbuilding in J.R.R. Tolkien's Middle-earth works in Korean press. "Moreover, unlike Tolkien who set the virtual history simply as a mythical battleground of good and evil, in Lee's world the moving history, politics, industries and cultural background are constructed in such great detail that this another world feels real and urgent, and sucks you in."

== Further development ==
The series features a fable within the story world, often called “The Four Brother Birds.” According to this tale told by the Kitalger Hunters, four brother birds each drink something different—blood, tears, poison, or water—which inspired speculation that Lee might complete a four-part series corresponding to each bird. However, Lee has publicly stated he has no current plans for additional sequels, saying, "I don't know anything for now. I have no plans." In a 2008 interview, when asked whether he intended to continue The Bird series, Lee replied with a laugh: "there are lots of rumors[...] About this "Bird" series too. I never declared that I would write a series, but before I knew it, apparently the new quartet or new saga has become my life's ambition. Well. If a story that I want to type comes up I will type it, if not I won't. I don't have any grand plan like 'I will type this before I die!'"
