= The Bird That Drinks Tears =

2003 fantasy novel series by Lee Young-do

- Cover design for all four volumes of The Bird That Drinks Tears
- The Heart of the Nhaga; Rekon Who Pursue Their Desire; Tokkebi Who Play Their Fire; Humans Who Seek Their King
- Author: Lee Young-do
- Original title: 눈물을 마시는 새
- Translator: Anton Hur
- Country: South Korea
- Language: Korean
- Genre: Fantasy
- Publisher: Golden Bough (Korea); Harper Voyager (USA)
- Published: 2002 (online); 2003 (print)
- Published in English: 2026
- No. of books: 4
- Followed by: The Bird That Drinks Blood

The Bird That Drinks Tears (Korean: 눈물을 마시는 새; RR: Nunmureul masineun sae; abbreviated as 눈마새; Nunmasae) is a series of epic high fantasy novels by South Korean author Lee Young-do. The series was first published online in 2002 and in hardback in 2003.

The series is set in a world inhabited by four major races: humans, the powerful bird-like Rekon, the flame-wielding Tokkebi, and the reptilian Nhaga. The Nhaga remove their own hearts to grant themselves immortality, and they dominate the southern half of the world. When a Nhaga envoy is dispatched to North, a trio comprising one member of each of the other races is assembled to escort the envoy. However, the original envoy is murdered, and his replacement is an anomaly: a Nhaga who still has a heart, making him much more vulnerable. As the rescue party navigates hostile terrain and centuries of animosity, they must confront their own prejudices and uncover the hidden purpose of their journey, which may determine the fate of the entire world.

The Bird That Drinks Tears is known for its original worldbuilding featuring languages, belief systems, and sociopolitical structures for each race. The series has been acclaimed for its integration of traditional Korean culture into epic fantasy. It departs from earlier fantasy works by embedding elements of Korean folklore and history, as well as Old Korean languages.

== Plot ==
"They say the bird that drinks tears sings the most beautiful song in the world."

— From The Heart of the Nhaga

The world is divided between North and the vast southern forest known as Kiboren. 1,500 years before the main events of the novel, the cold-blooded, reptilian race of Nhaga initiated a campaign of territorial expansion, leading to prolonged conflict with three other major races: humans, Rekons, and Tokkebis. The human Kingdom of Arajit eventually fell after centuries of war. The Nhaga, unable to survive in colder climates due to their physiology, ceased their advance at a boundary later known as the Line of Limit. Within the warmer southern lands, they planted dense forests, giving rise to the labyrinthine region of Koboren. Over time, the Nhaga and the northern races became entirely isolated from one another.

Seven centuries later, a message from Hainsha Temple summons three individuals—Byong Srabbel, a Tokkebi; Teenahan, a Rekon; and Kagan Draca, a human—requesting they enter Kiboren to rescue and escort a Nhaga to the temple. The mission references an ancient prophecy: "Three handles one."

Meanwhile, in the Nhaga city of Hattengraaj, a young Nhaga named Ryun Pei prepares for the Heart Extraction Ceremony, the coming-of-age ritual that grants immortality by removing and storing one's heart in the city's Heart Tower. Traumatized by memories of his father's death, Ryun flees the ritual. During his escape, he witnesses the murder of his friend Hwarit Mahkerow, who was to serve as the envoy to Hainsha Temple. Honoring Hwarit's dying wish, Ryun escapes the city to seek out the rescue party in his friend's place.

== Main characters ==
=== Rescue Party ===
Kagan Draca (케이건 드라카)

A mysterious human who hunts and eats Nhaga who wields Baragi, a unique sword with two parallel blades mounted on a single hilt. He is chosen as the "pathfinder" of the party to rescue and escort a Nhaga to the Hainsha Temple.

Byong Srabble (비형 스라블)

A cheerful Tokkebi who serves as the attendant to the lord of Tokkebi castle Chumunnuri(즈믄누리, "Thousand Worlds"). He possesses the ability to manipulate fire at will, and rides a large beetle named Naneui and serves as the party's "trickster."

Teenahan (티나한)
a Rekon warrior who wields a seven-meter-long iron spear made of stariron, a unique metal given to Rekons. Like all Rekons he bears a Calling—a lifelong aspiration unique to each Rekon, and his is to ascend to a Skyray, massive creatures drifting through the sky in this world. To achieve this goal, he has taken financial support from the Hainsha Temple, which offers to clear his past debts and fund his journey in exchange for him to join the rescue mission as the "defeater."

=== Nhaga ===
Ryun Pei (륜 페이)
A young male Nhaga who is haunted by the murder of his father, which he witnessed when he was eleven years old. He is sent on a mission to leave Kiboren and reach Hainsha Temple, where he must try to save all four races. Because of the death of his father, he fears extracting his heart and ran away from the heart extraction ritual. He later discovers a dragon root, names it 'Ashfarital' (아스화리탈) after his dead friend, and raises it as a dragon.

Sammo Pei (사모 페이)
A female Nhaga renowned for her dancing and swordsmanship. She is also kind to Nhaga males, which is uncommon behavior in Nhaga society. As a result, the Pei family is popular among males, and Sammo becomes an object of jealousy among other families. She is the elder sister of Ryun Pei. When Ryun is accused of murder, she sets out to execute her brother according to Nhaga tradition.

Hwarit Mahkerow (화리트 마케로우)
A novitiate to the Goddess Without Footsteps and a close friend of Ryun Pei. He was originally on a mission to contact the rescue party in the north.

Vyass Mahkerow (비아스 마케로우)
A renowned potion-maker, she has spent the past eleven years trying unsuccessfully to have a daughter, to strengthen her chance at becoming the next House Head of Mahkerow. Vyass holds deep resentment toward Sammo Pei, whom she believes unfairly attracts male Nhagas and diminishes her own chances.

Carindol Mahkerow (카린돌 마케로우)
The youngest woman of the Mahkerow House and the elder sister of Hwarit by 6 years, Carindol is the daughter of the current House Head and shares the same mother with Hwarit. Known for her dismissive attitude toward men, often treating them as fools and ignoring male visitors to the house, she refrained from the competitive childbearing customs but began to change after Hwarit’s death. She is known for her meticulousness, keeping keys and seals from other household members.

Galotek (갈로텍)
A Guardian of the Goddess Without Footsteps, he occupies a prestigious chamber high within the Heart Tower of Hattengraaj despite being under fifty, unusually young for his station. Galotek is both a priest and a Gunryungja(군령자, Host of Souls), a being who carries multiple souls within one body. He carries the soul of Juquedo Sarmak, a famed human general from 250 years ago known as the "Maestro of Death." He leads a plan to restore Nhaga dominance through the gods of the four races.

Serisma (세리스마)
Serisma is a Guardian of the Goddess Without Footsteps, who occupies the top floor and the highest rank of the Heart Tower in Hattengraaj. For many years, he has sought cooperation with the Hainsha Temple to counter Nhaga extremists' plans to manipulate the world’s climate, and planned to dispatch his novitiates, including Hwarit Mahkerow, as envoys.

=== People of the North ===
Gwalhaide Gyuriha (괄하이드 규리하)
Margrave of the martial province of Gyuriha, he defends the western mountain frontier of the former Kingdom of Arajit. A great warrior in his fifties, he is famed as one who can teach steadfastness to the mountains. He has sworn to defend the borderlands until the true king’s return, vowing to treat all who claim the throne prematurely as usurpers.

Lasu Gyuriha (라수 규리하)
Younger cousin to Margrave Gwalhaide, Lasu is regarded as a brilliant strategist. He lived quietly at the Hainsha Temple until the arrival of the rescue party led by Kagan Draca marked a turning point, leading him to summon Gwalhide. In the subsequent war against the Nhaga, Lasu serves as chief strategist for the allied forces of the other three races and uncovers the hidden truth of the Skyray.

Kitata Zaboro (키타타 자보로)
Grand General of the high-walled desert city of Zaboro, situated between the Siguriat Mountains and the Funten Desert in the south. As the uncle of Zaboro’s Maripgan, he is aware of his nephew’s unfitness to be king but has refrained from stopping him out of clan loyalty and personal compassion. After the Maripgan attacks the rescue party, Kitata soundly defeats and reprimands him, convincing him to abandon his ambition for the throne.

Orenol (오레놀)
Grand Benevolence(대덕) of Hainsha Temple, the youngest in the order's history to attain the position. This distinction has granted him knowledge of the temple’s ancient traditions, including the true identity of Kagan Draca. Frequently entrusted with external missions, Orenol delivered a letter to Kagan at the Last Inn and visits Teenahan's Skyray ruins excavation team in remote areas. Working alongside Great Zen Master Jutagi, he strives to thwart the Nhaga’s schemes and later uncovers secrets concerning both the gods and the Skyray.

Jutagi (쥬타기)
Grand Zen Master(대선사) of Hainsha Temple, who has communicated with Guardian Serisma to work together against Nhaga extremist plans.

Boni (보늬)
Kei's mother and the head of Siguriat Toll Road Rangers.

Kei (케이)
Boni's son and the aide of Siguriat Toll Road Rangers.

Deoni Dalbi (데오늬 달비)
Lieutenant of the Northern Army. She is noted for her constant running and her unconventional way of thinking, that draws attention of humans and Nhagas alike.

Bao Moridol (바우 머리돌)
The lord of Chumunuri.

== Races ==
The fictional world of The Bird That Drinks Tears is inhabited by four major intelligent races - Human, Nhaga, Rekon, and Tokkebi.

Human (인간)
Humans have the weakest power but the largest population among the four races. There are those who would love nothing more than to be crowned King and reestablish the once prosperous Kingdom of Arajit.

Nhaga (나가)
A cold-blooded race with reptilian features. They reside in Kiboren, a tropical jungle south of the Line of Limit. Nhaga have poor hearing and see differently from humans. They utilize a special form of silent communication called nearm(니름). They can achieve a state of functional immortality by extracting their own hearts.

Tokkebi (도깨비)

A race of mischievous and playful beings who utilize fire magic. They are afraid of blood, so they don't go to battle and live peacefully in the citadel of Chumunnuri (즈믄누리). Due to their religious beliefs regarding the afterlife, they do not fear death as other races do.

Rekon (레콘)
A race of giant, humanoid birds with overwhelming physical abilities. They have a fear of water. Rekons forge weapons made of Stariron and often take on life-long challenges.

== Creatures ==
Skyray (하늘치)
Massive creatures that drift through the sky with no apparent destination, skyrays have thousands of eyes and mysterious ruins can be seen on their backs. When provoked, they can unleash immense terror. (Note: The Bird That Drinks Tears, Vol. 4 – "The Human Who Wandered in Search of the King", Appendix – "Geographical and Terminology Guide")

Beetle (딱정벌레)
Herbivorous riding animals bred to great size by the Tokkebi, with the largest specimens reaching several meters and capable of flight carrying two adults or a single heavy Rekon. Humans also keep beetles, but these remain smaller and are used mainly for communication. Beetles can communicate simple messages through gestures with their antennae.

Dragon (용)
Hybrid beings with traits of both plants and animals, dragons reproduce through spores like plants but move and act like animals. Each dragon begins as a Dragonroot (용근) which can remain dormant underground or, under favorable conditions, ignite into a juvenile form.
Their growth and shape depends on their environment: one raised among horses may resemble a flying horse, while another in the sea might develop webbed feet. In rare cases, dragons can take on humanoid form. Despite such variety, all fully grown dragons share two traits: the ability to breathe fire and to spread spores. Dragon fire is considered the strongest flame, rivaled only by the supernatural fire of the Tokkebi.
Historically, dragons in their plant stage were exterminated by the Nhaga to protect their forests, leading to their eventual disappearance.

Great Tiger (대호)
A species of tiger, far larger than the common variety. Despite its massive size, it is fast and intelligent, capable of killing elephants and even fending off entire herds.

Dueoksini (두억시니)
Known as a race that has lost its god, the Dueoksini are deformed beings whose only consistent trait is their lack of definition. They show no consistent patterns in biology, form, behavior, abilities, or language, and they have no standard appearance.

== Factions and Organizations ==
Kingdom of Arajit (아라짓 왕국)
An ancient human kingdom that lasted for 700 years. It was founded by the Hero King, a Rekon. After his reign, the throne passed to humans.
Arajit fought centuries of wars against the Nhaga and their territorial expansion. The kingdom reached its height under the 21st monarch King Geugyeon(극연왕, "Bridge of Extremes"), who pushed the Nhaga south of Line of Limit. Its decline began with the loss of the Hero King’s sword Baragi, which undermined the loyalty of the Arajit warriors.
The kingdom fell under the 31st ruler, King Gwonneung(권능왕, "Power King"), after he insulted the Kitalze hunters. In response, they pronounced a curse: “There is no king now, and there shall be no king in the North until a king apologizes for this insult." (Note: The Bird That Drinks Tears, ch. 15 "Three Is Not Enough; 셋은 부족하다)")

Kitalze Hunters (키탈저 사냥꾼)
An ancient hunting group who believed themselves to be descendants of dragons, and claimed they could hunt any creature except the Skyray and the dragon. The latter was spared out of reverence rather than inability.

Nhaga Houses (나가 대가문)
In Nhaga society, the house is the smallest social unit, led by a female House Head. Each house consists of adult women over the age of 22 and all minors under 22, regardless of gender. Male Nhaga leave upon adulthood at 22, becoming outsiders who travel between houses and serve as breeding partners for the women they visit.
Within a house, minors address the House Head as “mother,” while their biological mother is called “aunt” unless she is the Head. The Head holds absolute authority, and succession is contested among sisters and nieces. Once a sister loses, she is barred from future contests, and her children are regarded as the Head’s own.
Succession typically follows the current Head’s nomination of a successor. Influencing factors include the Head's trust, standing within the house, reputation, age(respected in Nhaga culture), and whether the candidate has a daughter. If the Head dies or disappears without naming a successor, adult women elect one by vote.

Council of Houses (가문 평의회)
In Nhaga cities, all Houses are equal with no formal power over one another. The Council of Houses serves as a neutral body to mediate disputes and manage shared interests. It is composed of a Chair and the Heads of all Houses in the city. The Chair acts as a moderator but holds no authority beyond that role. Council resolutions can carry binding force in rare, deadlocked situations, but are usually applied only with the consent of all involved House Heads.

Guardians (수호자)
Nhaga priests devoted to the Goddess Without Footprints, living an ascetic lives within the Heart Tower at each city's center.
Known as the “Goddess’s Grooms”, they see their lives as an extended wedding ceremony to the Goddess. Death marks the conclusion of this union, when they become her husbands in the afterlife. Marriage, absent in other aspects of Nhaga culture, exists only between the Goddess and her Guardians. (Note: The Bird That Drinks Tears, ch. 7 "Goddess's Grooms; Korean: 여신의 신랑)")
Male Nhaga may apply before adulthood to become Novitiates, each receiving a unique sacred name for the Goddess. Upon reaching adulthood, they undergo the Heart Extraction Rite and are formally initiated. Guardians hold higher status than other males, earning respect from women as well. They oversee the Heart Extraction ceremony, maintain the tower, and preserve the hearts of all Nhaga in specialized heart vessels. (Note: The Bird That Drinks Tears, ch. 2 "A Silver Tear; 은루; 銀涙)")

Toll Road Guild (유료도로당)
An organization dedicated to maintaining and guarding toll roads. In the era of King Geugyeon, once called the “Road King,” many guilds operated across remote regions, but only one managing the Siguriat toll road has survived.

== Background and publication history ==
Lee serialized The Bird That Drinks Tears from March to August 2002 on a text-only online service HiTEL's Serial forum. After the conclusion of the story, the novel was published in 2003 by Golden Bough, an imprint of Minumsa Publishing Group, in 4 hardcover volumes themed after 4 major races:

- Book 1: The Heart of the Nhaga (Korean: 심장을 적출하는 나가)
- Book 2: Those Who Prepare the Way (Korean: 숙원을 추구하는 레콘)
- Book 3: Tokkebi Who Play Their Fire (Korean: 불을 다루는 도깨비)
- Book 4: Humans Who Seek Their King (Korean: 왕을 찾아헤매는 인간)

In July 2020, a full-cast unabridged audiobook adaptation of The Bird That Drinks Tears was released through Naver Audioclip. The production marked the largest-scale audiobook project in Korean publishing history, with an estimated production budget of 130 million KRW (approx. $100,000 USD) and breaking the Korean sales record for audiobooks with 100 million KRW 5 months later.

In 2023, Golden Bough published a special 20th anniversary illustrated edition. This edition featured 34 artworks by Seongmin Baek, six new short stories, and a limited-edition Yunnori set. In the same year, the translation rights to The Bird That Drinks Tears were sold to publishers in 12 countries. With a reported total advance of 600 million won (approx. US$500,000), it was widely covered in Korean media as the highest overseas sale for a single Korean novel at the time.

As of February 2026, Golden Bough stated that the novel has been translated into 17 languages.

In June 2026, an English-language version of The Heart of the Nhaga was translated by Anton Hur and published by Harper Voyager.

=== Sequel ===
In 2005, Lee published a sequel titled The Bird That Drinks Blood, set 50 years after the events of The Bird That Drinks Tears. The story takes place in the newly established Arajit Empire, ruled from the airborne capital Hanulnuri(Korean: 하늘누리, "Skyworld"), and explores themes of absolute power and free will.

== Reception and awards ==
Writing for Locus, Abigal Nussbaum reviewed Anton Hur's 2026 translation of The Heart of the Nhaga. Nussbaum writes that the book's promotional materials refer to the author as a Korean J. R. R. Tolkien, but the reviewer noted that this doesn't tell the full story. At first glance, a reader might compare the tree-loving Nhaga to Tolkien's elves. Later, Lee adds more details which make the Nhaga feel less fantastical and more like an exercise in "anthropological science fiction". The multi-species rescue party can also be compared to Tolkien's fellowship, but Nussbaum also notes that the work draws from action movies and anime. The review concluded by noting that The Heart of the Nhaga "combines the familiar structure and conventions of an epic fantasy with worldbuilding details that to a Western reader feel entirely alien."

== Adaptations ==
=== Video Games ===
The game development rights for The Bird That Drinks Tears have been held by Krafton since at least 2019, when the company first announced a mobile game based on the novel. However, the project faced criticism from both fans of the original work and the broader gaming community for being "a rebranded version of an existing game using the novel's intellectual property."

In May 2021, Krafton announced that the development would restart from the visual concept stage. Beginning in August 2022, Krafton launched "Project Windless," unveiling concept art and trailers for a new adaptation.

In 2023, Krafton announced a new Montreal-based development studio for the project, led by former Ubisoft developers. During Sony's February 12, 2026 State of Play, Project Windless was announced to release for the PlayStation 5, Windows and Xbox Series X/S.
