= InZOI =

Upcoming video game

- Developer: inZOI Studio
- Publisher: Krafton
- Director: Hyungjun Kim
- Engine: Unreal Engine 5
- Platforms: Windows; macOS; PlayStation 5
- Release: Windows; 28 March 2025 (early access); macOS; 20 August 2025 (early access); PlayStation 5; 2027 (early access)
- Genre: Life simulation
- Mode: Single-player

InZOI is an upcoming life simulation game developed by inZOI Studio and published by Krafton. The game was released in early access for Windows and macOS in 2025, with a PlayStation 5 release coming in early 2027.

== Gameplay ==
The player assumes an intern at AR Company, a virtual reality firm whose job is to manage a neighborhood of virtual people called "Zoi". The purpose of this mechanic is to manage the karma system within the world. Gameplay takes place in a variety of open world environments, where players can direct their characters and vehicles by point and click or by direct control. Players can customize their characters and houses how they desire, as well as edit the world scenery via the "city edit" mode. InZOI features many of the same mechanics previously seen in other life simulators like character creation, building tools, needs, social interactions, careers, education, relationships, families, skills, aging, and death. Characters have eight needs to fulfill: hunger, hygiene, bathroom, fun, social, energy, sleep, and recognition. The game features careers, where the player can make the Zoi fulfill certain tasks in various roles.

The game was launched with two open worlds: Dowon, a dense metropolis inspired by Seoul, and Bliss Bay, a coastal city inspired by Santa Monica; Kucingku (previously Cahaya), a resort town inspired by Bali, was released as a free DLC. Additional worlds based on locales in Asia, Europe, and Oceania are also planned. InZOI allows for the use of generative AI to create in-game patterns and objects. It has a custom furniture maker. Players can share their creations and find new ones through the in-game "Canvas" tool. InZOI will also come with plugins to allow for easy mod creation. InZOI supports various motion capture tools, such as real time facial tracking and full-body motion capture. InZOI uses the Metahuman "Live Link Face" app for Unreal Engine to capture facial expressions via mobile device.

== Development and release ==
InZOI is published by South Korean game publisher Krafton and developed by their inZOI Studio. The producer and director is Hyungjun "Kjun" Kim. The game is developed using Unreal Engine 5. The development of InZOI began in early 2023. The game's development team was composed of industry veterans known for their work on high-profile simulation games. The team sought to integrate advanced AI algorithms that drive character behavior, making each Zoi's actions and interactions as lifelike as possible. A significant aspect of the game's development focused on the "Canvas" tool, an integrated system designed for creators to share their custom content.

The game was released in early access for Windows via Steam on 28 March 2025. The macOS version, announced at WWDC 2025, released on 20 August 2025. Initially announced for a 2026 release, a PlayStation 5 port was delayed to early 2027. InZOI supports modding, with official mod support added in May 2025.

== Marketing ==
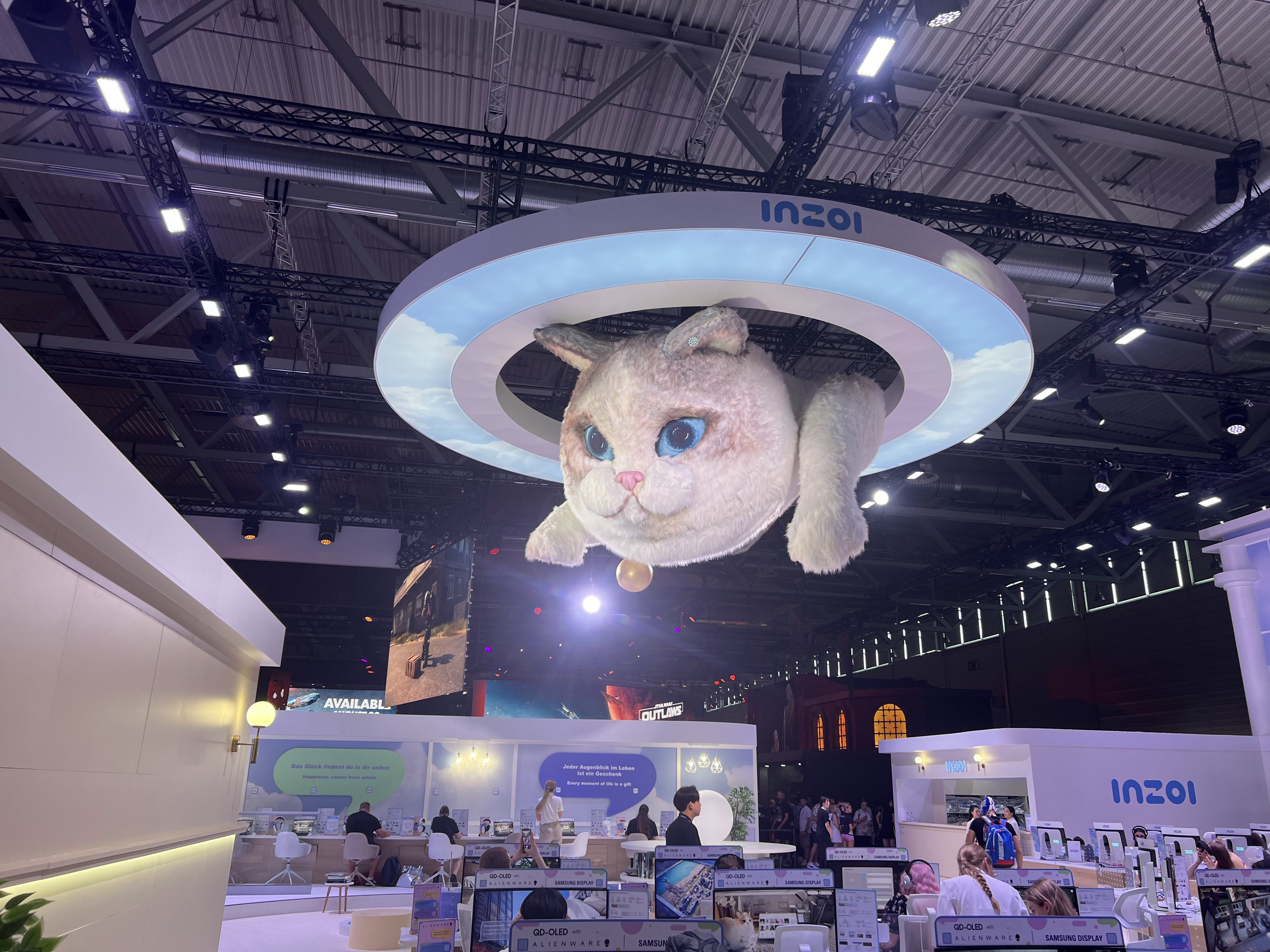
Fictional character Psycat above the booth at Gamescom 2024

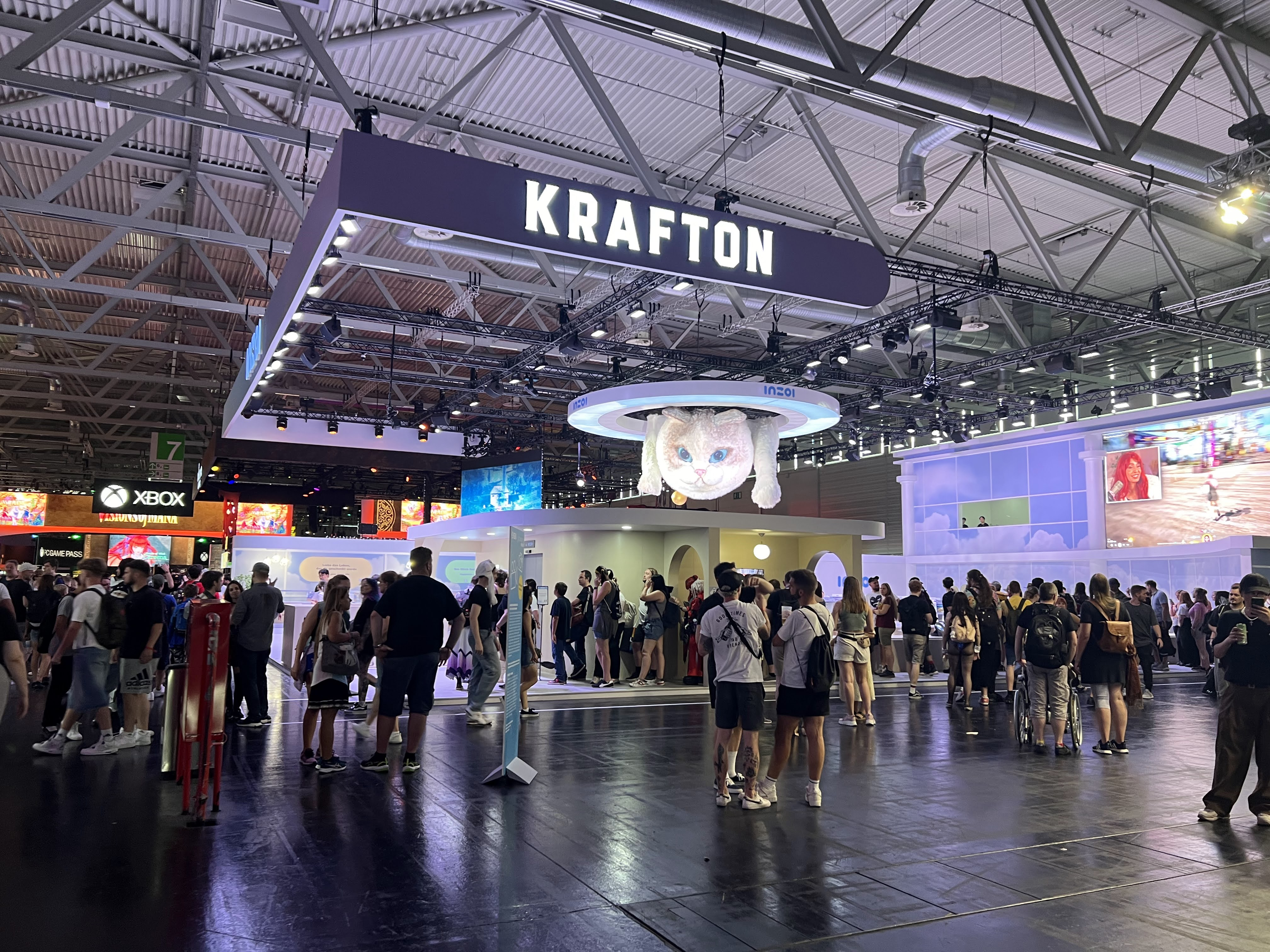
InZOI booth at Gamescom 2024

InZOI was first unveiled through a gameplay demo at G-STAR 2023, providing a first look at the character creation, build and city edit modes, world environment, weather, and gameplay. As part of Krafton's showcase at the 2024 Gamescom, an InZOI booth featured a demo of the game. People who participated received fake employee badges with their names and avatars created in game. The booth also marketed their collaboration with Samsung Display, with 13 of their concept products being recreated in InZOI. The booth was made to resemble the fictional AR COMPANY, alongside a large recreation of Psycat—a prominent character in promotional material for the game.

In May 2024, Krafton held a contest on CONNECT, a digital fashion platform by CLO Virtual Fashion, in which participants could submit designs for a chance at prize money and the use of their assets in InZOI. 15 winners were selected in various categories. InZOI Character Studio, a character creation program, was released on 20 August 2024 on Steam for a limited time, reaching 18,000 concurrent players at one point. The game features in-game product placements from various real-world brands, such as Samsung Electronics, Samsung Display, LG Electronics, and Hyundai Motor.

== Reception ==
Critics praised InZOI's visual presentation and character creation tools. GameSpot described the game as "gorgeous, innovative, and brimming with potential," noting its "mind-blowing" visual quality and "stunning" character creator. The game's use of Unreal Engine 5 was particularly highlighted, with reviewers noting the photorealistic graphics and detailed character models. The building and customization tools received significant praise. Game Rant noted that the character creation process was "nothing short of incredible" and that the building tools offered "extensive options" that would appeal to fans of life simulation games. The ability to customize city elements, including weather, traffic, and environmental details, was highlighted as a unique feature that distinguished it from competitors.

Critics identified significant gameplay and content limitations. GameSpot's review noted that while the game was "impressive, immersive, and brimming with potential," it suffered from "sterility and lifelessness" that made it difficult to find enjoyable. GamesRadar+ described the game as feeling "like a soulless imitation of the worst parts of The Sims", criticizing the lack of meaningful interaction between characters.

In May 2025, the game received negative user reviews in response to Krafton's announcement regarding the use of generative AI in InZOI.

=== Sales ===
The game sold over 1 million copies within its first week of early access release, marking the fastest sales milestone ever achieved by a title published by Krafton. InZOI achieved significant commercial success immediately following its early access launch on 28 March 2025. The game ranked first on Steam's Global Top Wishlists one day before launch and rose to number one on Steam's Global Top Sellers List within 40 minutes of release. The game peaked at 87,377 concurrent players on Steam and reached 175,000 concurrent viewers on Twitch, ranking third in the platform's Games Category.

The game's Canvas user-generated content platform demonstrated strong community engagement, with over 1.2 million players interacting on launch day and more than 470,000 pieces of content uploaded.

== See also ==
- Paralives
