= Chang Byung-gyu =

South Korean businessman (born 1973)

- 장병규

Chairman of the Special Committee on the 4th Industrial Revolution of the National Assembly of the Republic of Korea
- In office 2017–2020
- President: Moon Jae-in
- Succeeded by: Yoon Seong-ro

Personal details
- Born: 25 April 1973 (age 53) Daegu, South Korea
- Education: KAIST
- Occupation: Businessman; investor

Chang Byung-gyu (Korean: 장병규; born 25 April 1973) is a South Korean business executive and investor. He is best known as the founder and chairman of Krafton, a video game publishing and holding company known for PUBG: Battlegrounds. Chang was the first and second chairman of South Korea's Presidential Committee on the 4th Industrial Revolution. He is a co-founder of Neowiz, a holding company, and BonAngels, a venture capital firm where he serves as an advisor.

As of April 2025, Forbes estimates his net worth at US$1.1 billion.

== Early life and education ==
Chang was born on 25 April 1973 in Daegu, South Korea. He attended Daegu Science High School, where he graduated early. In 1991, he enrolled at KAIST, earning a Bachelor of Arts and Science in Computer Science in 1995, a Master of Arts and Science in Computer Science in 1997, and a PhD in computer science at KAIST's graduate school.

== Career ==
In 1997, Chang co-founded Neowiz, along with seven other co-founders, and served as chief technology officer (CTO).

Chang left Neowiz in 2005 and founded First Snow, a search engine startup. The company's technology was sold to Naver Corporation for ₩35 billion won (US$31 million) in 2006.

In March 2007, Chang founded Bluehole Studio. Chang founded venture capital firm BonAngels in 2012, which invests in early-stage startups.

On 22 April 2015, Bluehole Studio rebranded to Bluehole and acquired several video game studios.

In 2017, Chang joined the Presidential Committee on the 4th Industrial Revolution as its first and second chairman until 2020. During the term, he led the proposal of industrial innovation plans for the South Korean government.

Chang established Krafton on 5 November 2018 to serve as a holding company for Bluehole. The same year, Tencent bought a 10% stake in the company for US$500 million, making Krafton a unicorn.

In August 2021, Chang became a billionaire after Krafton went public in an initial public offering (IPO).

In March 2022, Chang donated approximately ₩37.4 billion (US$30 million) worth of Krafton stock to executives and employees.

== Personal life ==
Chang is married to Jung Seung-hye, who holds less than 1% of Krafton.
