= Paralives =

Life simulation video game

- Developer: Paralives Studio
- Publisher: Paralives Studio
- Designer: Alex Massé
- Programmers: Alex Massé; Anna Thibert; Jérémie Tessier; Étienne Brisson; Richard Rail; Alejandro Flores Lerdo de Tejada
- Artists: Léa Sorribès; Sonia M’hamdi; Alice Joubin; Chloé Ouellet; Lina Molard
- Composer: Andrei Castañon
- Engine: Unity
- Platforms: Windows, macOS
- Release: Early access; May 25, 2026
- Genre: Life simulation
- Mode: Single-player

Paralives is a life simulation game developed and published by Paralives Studio for Windows and macOS. The game features character creation, house building, and life simulation gameplay set within an open world environment. It was released in early access on May 25, 2026.

== Gameplay ==
Paralives takes place in an open world environment with employment opportunities alongside events such as festivals. Players can build houses, create characters and control their lives in a desired way.

The character creator, titled as "Paramaker", allows the customization of the appearance and personality of "Parafolk", the name of the in-game characters. Players are able to customize the physique and height of the Parafolk. The root and shade of hair, clothing and accessories can be toggled as intended using color swatches, color wheels and texture selection.

A similar system is in place for objects and structures, allowing the player to adjust the size, placement, color and texture of walls, floors, windows, doors, and furniture.

The simulation aspect of the game features "together cards" that appear to players after a "together bar" is filled up during a character's conversation.

== Development ==
Paralives is being developed by indie game designer Alex Massé. After working on several projects such as PewDiePie's Tuber Simulator and a number of demos for Project Tiny, Massé quit his job and began developing Paralives regularly. Development of the game started in January 2019 and was officially announced in June 2019. The game is developed using Unity.

Paralives was initially a solo project by Massé, but as of June 2025, the team had expanded to fourteen people, collectively forming Paralives Studio. Massé created Paralives to offer a sense of endless customization with "powerful and intuitive tools that allow players to easily create any house with precision". He was inspired by the road tool in Cities: Skylines and developed a similar tool in Paralives for building houses. The developers incorporated the technique of procedural animation, which involves automatic reactions based on previously created animations to save developing time.

The game was funded through the crowdfunding platform Patreon and backers are invited to propose suggestions regarding content they would like to see in the full release. Massé chose to use Patreon after seeing Ooblets's success on the service. By November 2023, the Paralives Patreon page had over 15,000 supporters and earned over $35,000 per month. Massé confirmed that Paralives would not receive paid downloadable content, instead the game will be supported through free updates during and after Early Access.

Following the game's Early Access launch, Paralives Studio published a development roadmap estimating approximately two years of Early Access development before version 1.0 will be available.

== Marketing and release ==
In January 2021, Paralives won the title of "Most Anticipated Canadian Game" in a poll organised by CanadianGameDevs.com.

On June 12, 2021, Paralives featured in Wholesome Direct event, showcasing the game's building tools. In July 2024, as part of Paralives Studio's showcase at the 2024 Montreal Comiccon, a Paralives booth was set up for attendees to try the build mode demo of the game. The developer revealed the Early Access release date alongside the game's new trailer during the PC Gaming Show on June 8, 2025.

Paralives was released in Early Access on Steam for Windows and macOS on May 25, 2026, at a price of US $39.99. The game launched to a positive player reception, selling 250,000 copies within eight hours of its launch on Steam. Within the first month after release, the game managed to sell 1 million copies.

== Reception ==
=== Early access ===
The early access debut was met a favorable response from gaming publications, who considered the release a promising start that nonetheless needs further refinement, development and content. The most praised aspects were the build mode and character creator. The most critized parts were the user interface, parts of the live mode, and its technical issues and bugs. The game is regarded as a viable competitor towards The Sims, the franchise who is a dominant player in the life simulation genre.

PC Gamer described the game as a promising Sims rival, who is the "very definition of early access". They praised the build mode and character creator. The live mode received the most scrutiny, characterizing it as buggy, and where they encountered the most performance issues. They described the autonomy of characters as "barebones", but commended the interactions between the characters. Writing for Kotaku, Ash Parrish highlighted the degree of customization of the build mode, viewing it almost as a separate game. In contrast, Parrish criticized the live mode, describing it as "clunky", she found characters not responsive enough even if they were told to do simple tasks. She also opined that user interface needs more work. Eurogamer similarly described the game as "promising" and was impressed with the building tools, calling it "enormously flexible" and highlighting its customisation options. He viewed Paralives as more relaxed experience, saying it's a "counterpoint to the chaos" of Sims 4. His main point of criticism was leveled towards the user interface, saying he had difficulties finding his way around the UI.

In their early access review, IGN noted the art style as a standout liking it to older Telltale Games, calling it "easy on the eyes". The reviewer was more critical of the Parafolk's personalities regarding it as too limited and not seeing enough deviation between the characters. She was more positive on the Story Cards system, finding that it keeps the game fresh. She also praised construction mode, but did opined that not enough objects were interactable in the game world and also concluded that the setting doesn’t feel like "an entirely cohesive society" yet and that activities around the world weren't enough. In her verdict, Thwaites wrote that the game is a "much-needed breath of fresh air" in a genre that is dominated by one franchise despite its "rough edges".

== See also ==
- InZOI
- The Sims
