= Neon Giant =

Swedish video game developer

Neon Giant AB
- Type: Subsidiary
- Industry: Video games
- Founded: April 2018; 8 years ago
- Founder: Tor Frick; Arcade Berg; Jonathan Heckley; Erik Gloersen
- Headquarters: Uppsala, Sweden
- Area served: Worldwide
- Key people: Tor Frick (creative director); Arcade Berg (creative director)
- Owner: Krafton (2022–present)
- Number of employees: 23 (2025)
- Website: neongiant.se

Neon Giant AB is a Swedish video game developer headquartered in Uppsala, Sweden. It was founded by Tor Frick, Arcade Berg, Jonathan Heckley and Erik Gloersen in 2018.

== History ==
Neon Giant was founded in April 2018 as an independent venture by former AAA employee game developers Tor Frick, Arcade Berg, Jonathan Heckley and Erik Gloersen. With the support of investor company Goodbye Kansas (now known as Amplifier Game Invest), Neon Giant received an initial investment of 1,000,000 kr (approximately $110,000). Upon investing in the company, Amplifier Game Invest CEO Per-Arne Luundberg said — "Neon Giant consists of a real dream team that not only has enormous experience, they also have an incredibly efficient working process —I'm convinced that their first release will be a milestone in Swedish game development". The founders had previously worked on popular games such as Bulletstorm, Far Cry 3, Gears of War, Wolfenstein and Doom.

On 28 June 2018, Neon Giant were recipients of one of 37 developers grants offered by Epic Games to promising developers working with Unreal Engine 4. They were awarded between $5,000 and $50,000 based on their work on an unannounced title "set in a brand new cyberpunk world".

In May 2020, Neon Giant announced their debut game, The Ascent. It is a cyberpunk themed action role-playing game which was released on 29 July 2021. The Neon Giant team consists of 11 people.

On 11 November 2022, South Korean video game publisher Krafton announced that it planned to acquire Neon Giant for an undisclosed amount - which was scheduled to begin on 14 December.

== Games developed ==
| Title | Year | Platform(s) | Ref. |
|---|---|---|---|
| The Ascent | 2021 | Microsoft Windows, Xbox Series X/S, Xbox One, PlayStation 4, PlayStation 5, Nintendo Switch 2 | |
| No Law | TBA | Microsoft Windows, Xbox Series X/S, PlayStation 5 | |
