= Lee Young-do =

South Korean novelist (born 1972)

- Born: 1972 (age 53–54); Busan, South Korea
- Occupation: Novelist
- Writing career
- Genres: Fantasy; Science fiction
- Notable works: Dragon Raja; The Bird That Drinks Tears
- Movement: Korean fantasy boom of the late 1990s

Korean name
- Hangul: 이영도
- Hanja: 李英道
- RR: I Yeongdo
- MR: I Yŏngdo
- Website: cafe.naver.com/bloodbird.cafe

Lee Young-do (Korean: 이영도; Hanja: 李英道; born 1972) is a Korean novelist known for his work in the fantasy and science fiction genre. He wrote Dragon Raja series of fantasy novels, and The Bird That Drinks Tears.

His debut work Dragon Raja was first published in 1998, reportedly selling close to 2 million books in 4 languages. This was a significant feat for the fantasy genre in Korea where the annual circulation of domestic literature and fiction titles as a whole, ranges between 12~20 million copies.

Dragon Raja's success has prompted a rapid growth of Korean fantasy and science fiction genre, and contributed to the growing acceptance of web fiction in 2000s, referred to as "Internet literature" at the time, both by the country's general public and literary world. Lee is widely regarded as one of the best-selling fantasy writers in Korea.

== Background ==
=== Early life ===
Lee was born in 1972 in Busan, South Korea, the first child of two brothers. When Lee was 2 years old, his family moved to Masan in South Gyeongsang Province where he has lived since. As a child he read heavily in various subjects. In 1991 he entered Kyungnam University where he studied Korean language and literature.

He started writing seriously from 1993, but didn't think that he would be writing novels.

=== Beginnings of the "typer" ===
Mid-1990s were when fantasy and science fiction literature was just being introduced to Korea. Lee remembered that "if you asked people what is fantasy, they would say 'Isn't that like western martial arts'" in a 2008 interview. He found the genre attractive and decided to try a story with it. At the time, several online services, similar to CompuServe in the U.S., emerged in Korea. Lee joined one such provider, Hitel, to start posting on its Serial forum what would be the first chapters of Dragon Raja.

Lee serialized Dragon Raja from October 1997 to April 1998, referring to himself as "typer" rather than a writer, due to his method of composing directly on a keyboard. The work gained significant popularity during its run, reportedly attracting readers who waited online for new chapters, often posted after midnight. This pattern led to an informal nickname among fans, who humorously referred to themselves as zombies and to Lee as the Necromancer, a reflection of the serialized nature and late-night updates. Over the six-month serialization, Dragon Raja accumulated approximately 900,000 hits, prompting Golden Bough, an imprint of Minumsa Publishing Group, to acquire the publishing rights. The novel was subsequently released beginning in May 1998 in 12 paperback volumes.

In the midst of his debut success, Lee began typing his second novel Future Walker, a sequel to Dragon Raja. Future Walker was serialised on the same forum from October 1998 to June 1999, and published in August by Golden Bough in 7 paperback volumes.

Lee continued to use Hitel's serial forum for writing his novels such as Polaris Rhapsody, The Bird That Drinks Tears, The Bird That Drinks Blood and a few short stories. All of these stories were published upon completion (and deleted from the forum) or collected in later publications by Golden Bough, which remains Lee's publisher today.

This practice of online serialization and getting published based on its popularity (estimated by the work's view counts) surged in fantasy, science, romance fiction in Korea. Online forums dedicated to these genres opened in hundreds by 2000 attracting prospective writers, and caused the boom of the Internet literature.

=== After Hitel ===
The popularization of HTTP and the Web browser caused the decline of Hitel and other commercial online services, and Lee's readership on the forum was greatly reduced. But Lee continued to use Hitel forum to 2005, completing The Bird That Drinks Blood, the last of his multi-volume novels as of July 2014.

After the forum was closed in 2007 Lee said in an interview that he was searching for a place to serialize his work online, saying that "the realtime feedback from the readers is a big joy, and I miss that feeling." But he found it difficult to find a replacement to the old text-only forum, which was "easier for [him] to access because [the forum]'s white text on blue limited one's expression to text, and it enabled [him] to show individuality purely through words." The web's increased sense of community and of the writer's presence thereby, made it more difficult for him. "I believe words and people are separate," Lee said, "some people may like a writing and want to find about the writer, but I don't."

Between 2005 and 2008 Lee wrote several short stories for science fiction magazines, including Regarding the Translation of KAIWAPANDOM which has been translated into English. There were talks of publishing Dragon Raja in the United States in 2006, to which Lee's response was "I don't want to disgrace our country."

Lee's publisher Golden Bough has run an online community from 2000 and invite the fan community to get involved in publication of Lee's books, such as limited edition campaigns, audiobook productions, and previews for upcoming works.

Officially, not much is known about Lee's life outside writing, other than that he helps out at his parents' persimmon farm in his spare time.

== Writing (or Typing) ==
Since his debut with Dragon Raja Lee has been recognized for his prolific output, having published 40 books, including six novels, in the span of seven years. When asked about his writing speed, he remarked "it just gets written, and once started I can't contain it, and sometimes write as much as [29 pages] a day," while also noting that "each line after line is hard still."

Lee often incorporates wordplay and philosophical discourse into his work, frequently exploring metaphysical themes. He described his approach as "the way I like is, even if it becomes difficult, separating what can be separated."

=== Korean fantasy genre ===
Lee is often credited as one of the pioneers for fantasy literature in Korea for helping legitimize the genre within the country's literary circles. His works are known for their large-scale worldbuilding and for incorporating political and philosophical themes. Lee has been reluctant to comment on critical interpretations of his work.

In an interview with Naver Lee stated that "fantasy is better when read as fantasy", expressing concern that excessive allegorical readings could obscure a work's imaginative value. He remarked:

"Treating The Lord of the Rings as a shoddy allegory to reality, or reading it as an example of Orientalism where Gandalf the 'White' crowns the returned king of the 'West', would leave a lot of the novel to be missed. (If you admit such, almost outrageous logic, then because humanity becomes extincts many times, Kurt Vonnegut would be anti-humanism, sadly.)"

He continued:

"Fantasy is fantasy—it is not reality's narrow allegories or a frightening siumulcarum; it neither disguises reality nor replaces it."

Lee compared the experience of reading fantasy to entering another world to give or gain something, and then returning to reality, citing The Neverending Story by Michael Ende as an example. He also noted being "fantastic" has little to do with a fantasy work's overall quality.

=== Style and major themes ===
Lee's writing style is characterized by frequent use of defamiliarization, with metaphysical and philosophical conversations forming a core element of his narratives.

A recurring theme in Lee's work examination of human nature, especially humanity's capacity for change. In Dragon Raja series, humans are portrayed as a race defined not by innate strength—unlike elves, dwarves, or dragons—but by their ability to change the world and shape time. (Note: Dragon Raja, ch. 2 "Of Kettles and Heads; 주전자와 머리의 비교") This theme is further developed in Future Walker which explores how this transformative capacity influences the future. (Note: Future Walker, Chapter 9 "The Artisan of Time; 시간의 장인")

In Polaris Rhapsody Lee explores the human desire for revenge and freedom within feudal conflicts and pirate wars. The story also introduces the Highmasters of Pandamonium, figures comparable to Seven Princes of Hell, who collectively vote on the fate of humanity. (Note: Polaris Rhapsody, Vol. 1 "The Empire's Public Enemy No. 1; 제국의 공적 1호" Book introduction by the publisher)

Lee's novels often delve into religion and political power structures. In Polaris Rhapsody a religious institution resembling the medieval Catholic Church coexists with the Highmasters, who play active roles in politics and warfare. In The Bird That Drinks Tears, the world is shaped by a cosmology of four gods, each associated with a specific race. Each race receives distinct traits and gifts from its patron deity, and the balance of power among these gods sustains the flow of the world. If any one is disrupted, the world's cycle is thrown into disorder. The title of the novel refers to an ideal ruler—one who "drinks the tears" of others; symbolizing compassion and the burden of leadership.

The concept of the king(왕)—an ideal ruler—reappears throughout Lee's works. In The Bird That Drinks Tears the human race is portrayed as seeking the king, and its sequel, The Bird That Drinks Blood, depicts an empire founded by this ideal king. The empire achieves peace and order, governed from a grand flying capital. The story is presented through multiple character perspectives, each relating to the empire's power and their own roles within or against it.

Wordplay involving Korean language appears frequently in Lee's character and creature names. In Dragon Raja and Future Walker, for example, the character name "Karl" reflect his sharp intellect, as "kal(칼)" means "knife" in Korean. Similarly, "Sanson" alludes to strength in battle, derived from "ssen son(센 손)" meaning "strong hands." In Polaris Rhapsody, the brothers Sopala and Sosara have names that translate to “Sellcow” and “Buycow.”In The Bird That Drinks Blood, the brothers Saramal and Paramal mean “Buyhorse” and “Sellhorse” respectively. The same novel features two skyrays(하늘치) from opposing factions named Sori and Mali. These names carry multiple meanings in Korean: Sori(소리) can mean "sound" or "cow-ry,” and Mali(말리) can mean “jasmine flower” or “horse-ry."

== Bibliography ==
=== Dragon Raja series ===
Set in a fantasy world influenced by the works of J.R.R. Tolkien and Dungeons & Dragons, the series explores themes of change, identity, and power.

- Dragon Raja (드래곤 라자) (1998)
- Future Walker (퓨처 워커) (1999)
- Marks of Shadow (그림자 자국) (2008) - Set a thousand years after the original novels

==== Short stories ====
- Golem (골렘) (1998)
- Chimera (키메라) (2001)
- The Source of Happiness (행복의 근원) (2004)

==== Children's book ====
- Wisdom of the Desert (사막의 지혜) (2008) - An illustrated story published as part of Dragon Raja 's 10th anniversary edition

=== The Bird series ===
Critically noted for its use of archaic Korean and mythological depth, the series features four races and their deities.

- The Bird That Drinks Tears (눈물을 마시는 새) (2003)
- The Bird That Drinks Blood (피를 마시는 새) (2005)

==== Short story collections ====
- You Are My (너는 나의) (2023) - A special short story published for the 20th anniversary of The Bird That Drinks Tears.
- Sketches (소묘들) (2023) - Contains six short stories by Lee, published for the 20th anniversary of The Bird That Drinks Tears.

==== Spin-off ====
- Elegy of the Forest (숲의 애가) (2023) - A fan-fiction anthology of six short stories set in the Bird series universe, written by other authors and selected via a competition held by the publisher. Lee contributed commentary on each story.

=== Over series ===
Set in a small frontier town protected by Deputy Sheriff Tir Strike and Sheriff Ifari, blending fantasy and social commentary.

- Over the Choice (오버 더 초이스) (2018)

==== Short stories ====
- Over the Horizon (오버 더 호라이즌) (2001)
- Over the Nebula (오버 더 네뷸러) (2001)
- Over the Mist (오버 더 미스트) (2004)

=== Other works ===
- Polaris Rhapsody (폴라리스 랩소디) (2001) tells the story of pirates, medieval empires and the church.
- Chapter of Shiha and Kanta - A Story of the Mart (시하와 칸타의 장 - 마트 이야기) (2020)
- Sir Urstam's Last Words (어스탐 경의 임사전언) (Upcoming, 2025)
  - Related short stories: Esoril's Dragon (에소릴의 드래곤) (2009), Shangpi's Miners (샹파이의 광부들) (2009)

=== Speculative short fiction ===
Collected in Regarding Starknitting (별뜨기에 관하여) (2020)

- Mysterious Stories (SINBIROUN 이야기) (2000)
- Spring Is Here (봄이 왔다) (2005)
- Regarding the Translation of KAIWAPANDOM (카이와판돔의 번역에 관하여) (2005) – English translation available
- Regarding the Robot that Became A Savior (구세주가 된 로봇에 대하여) (2006)
- Regarding the Meaning of Teleportation (순간이동의 의미에 대하여) (2007)
- The Eye Looking at Me (나를 보는 눈) (2008)
- Regarding Starknitting (별뜨기에 관하여) (2008)
- Regarding the Mother of Vengeance (복수의 어머니에 관하여) (2012)

==== Other collected works ====
- Lee Youngdo's Stories of Fantasy (이영도 판타지 단편집) (2001)
- Over the Horizon: A Collection of Lee Youngdo's Fantastic Stories (오버 더 호라이즌 – 이영도 환상단편 소설선) (2004)
- Over the Horizon: Short & Novella by Lee Youngdo (오버 더 호라이즌 – 이영도 중단편소설집) (2018)

== Adaptations ==
=== Video games ===
==== Dragon Raja & Future Walker ====
The world and characters of Dragon Raja and Future Walker have been adapted into several games. One of the earliest was Dragon Raja Online (2000), a PC MMORPG released in 10 countries, including Taiwan and China, where it was marked under the title 龍族. The novel was published as the same title and promoted alongside the game in these markets. Several mobile games based on Dragon Raja have since been released, including the action RPG Dragon Raja M (2016) and Dragon Raja Origin (2021).

==== The Bird That Drinks Tears ====
In August 2022, the game company Krafton announced Project Windless, a video game adaptation of The Bird That Drinks Tears. The company unveiled concept art and cinematic trailers and published an art book Crossing the Limit (Korean: 한계선을 넘다) featuring development insights and artworks by 17 artists including renowned film designer Iain McCaig.

The project is currently under development by Krafton Montreal, led by a team that includes former Ubisoft developers.

=== Illustrated editions ===
The Japanese edition of Dragon Raja and Future Walker are illustrated by Eiji Kaneda, best known for his work for the anime Genesis of Aquarion.

Some of Lee's short stories Regarding the Translation of KAIWAPANDOM and Regarding Starknitting include illustrations.

The 20th anniversary editions of The Bird That Drinks Tears and The Bird That Drinks Blood feature new artworks by Seongmin Baek, known for his Korean painting style graphic novels.

=== Audiobooks ===
Several of Lee's works have been adapted into audio dramas or unabridged audiobooks, often with full voice casts:

- Over The Choice (2018) – Audio drama
- The Bird That Drinks Tears (2020) – Full-cast unabridged audiobook
- Marks of Shadow (2020) – Full-cast unabridged audiobook
- Esoril's Dragon (2020) – Audio drama
- Over The Horizon / Over the Nebula / Over the Mist (2021) – Audio dramas
- A Scene from a Laboratory (2021) – Audio drama
- Regarding Starknitting / The Translation of KAIWAPANDOM (2021) – Audio dramas
- Dragon Raja (2021–2022) – Full-cast unabridged audiobook, released exclusively on Naver Audio Clip.
- You Are My / Sketches (2023) – Audio dramas
- The Bird That Drinks Blood – Full-cast unabridged audiobook currently in production, announced by Golden Bough in 2024

=== Radio ===
In 2001, Dragon Raja was adopted for radio as part of KBS Radio 2's Fantasy Express program. A total of 83 episodes were broadcast.
