= Mistover =

2019 video game

- Developer: Krafton
- Publisher: Krafton
- Platforms: Microsoft Windows; Nintendo Switch; PlayStation 4
- Release: October 10, 2019
- Genres: Roguelike, role-playing
- Mode: Single player

Mistover (stylized as MISTOVER) is a 2019 roguelike dungeon crawler role-playing video game developed and published by Krafton for Microsoft Windows, Nintendo Switch, and PlayStation 4. Mistover is set in a ravaged world recovering from a mass invasion of monstrous creatures from another realm, and its storyline follows the journey of a party of adventuring heroes who are on a quest to discover the source of the invasion. Players navigate environments from an isometric perspective with a party of procedurally generated player characters drawn from a roster of eight character classes to fight monsters and acquire loot recovered from the exploration of levels. A phenomenon known as "mist" is prevalent throughout the game world and negatively influences its characters, monsters, and items.

Mistover was intentionally designed to be a difficult game. The developers wanted the game's constant tension and dangerous dungeon areas to provide players with a sense of challenge and force them to make the appropriate decisions that would ensure the survival of the overall party. Many aspects of the game's gameplay design and art style were inspired by similar video games in the dungeon crawler genre, such as Darkest Dungeon and Etrian Mystery Dungeon. Mistover has been delisted from all digital storefronts as of June 2022, following its worldwide release on October 10, 2019.

Mistover drew mixed reviews from video game publications. Its art style as well as aspects of its dungeon exploration and tactical turn-based combat have been praised, whereas criticism focused on its harsh gameplay systems which have been described as derivative or repetitive.

== Gameplay ==
Mistover is an isometric dungeon-crawler role-playing video game set in a fictional world which had been devastated by monstrous creatures that emerged from an interdimensional vortex called "the Pillar of Despair". The invading creatures had vanished from the world prior to the events of the game, though the vortex is still open. A party of adventuring heroes managed and controlled by the player is tasked with traveling into the vortex to discover the origins of the monsters and prevent another invasion. The game's narrative features multiple endings.

Mistover consists of five different game regions. Each region consists of randomized dungeons with various paths, portals, and maze traps. The game is played out with a mix of real-time movement and turn-based combat. Prior to entering a dungeon, players can use facilities in the game's hub area to manage their roster of heroes and inventory of items. The objective for most levels is to plot a course through uncharted territory in search of the dungeon exit, and discover keys and treasure throughout the course of exploration. Movement is tile-based during the exploration phase, with each step taken gradually costing hit points and reducing visibility for the player. Only the designated party leader is visible and directly controlled by the player during exploration, while other party members appear when transitioning into combat sequences after encountering enemies during exploration. The mist phenomena affects visibility during exploration by obscuring the player's view and making it harder to avoid monsters in a level. To counteract and replenish the "Light" resource which lowers the player's field of view as it gradually depletes, players must find and acquire "Light Flowers". To bolster survivability during exploration, characters may consume food to manage hunger and recover hit points, or use the environment to attempt to avoid enemy encounters, such as hiding in bushes. There are also special environmental features and tiles that provide the party with positive or negative statistical changes.

Mistover incorporate gameplay conventions and mechanics from the roguelike genre. The maps and layout of game levels are randomly generated based on the statistics of the player's party, the mission goal, and the difficulty level. A key feature is permadeath, where player characters who lose all of their health are considered permanently dead and could no longer be used. In the event this occurs, the player must recruit a randomly generated character as a replacement hero. Each hero has their own statistics and skills that can be upgraded over time, and belongs to one of eight character classes: the Witch, Shadow Blade, Grim Reaper, Paladin, Ronin, Sister, Werewolf and Onmyouji. Each character having a range of skills and abilities, each of which play out with a stylized animation segment when activated, that can help them attack enemies, reposition themselves, or confer positive and negative status effects. For example, the Sister can both heal allies and produce attack-oriented abilities like stunning enemy units, while a Paladin may move several squares with a charge attack. Besides basic attacks, many character abilities come with high risk and reward choices for the player to deliberate on: a character that attacks with a big critical hit may experience a negative statistical shift as a side effect. A successful outcome during combat situations hinges on the appropriate use of skills and the positioning of each party member, as well as an effective balance between offensive, defensive, and supportive character classes in the player's active party, or "Corps Crew", which consists of five characters.

== Development and release ==
Mistover was developed and published by South Korean company Krafton. In response to the stagnation of the domestic mobile game market in the country, Krafton developed it as part of a corporate strategy to diversify the company's game publishing platforms and better reach out to global users. Krafton employee Woo Seok Lee noted that the South Korean video game industry is dominated by PC-exclusive titles or online free-to-play games with microtransactions. He posited Mistover as one of the earliest attempts for a major Korean video game developer to specifically develop a single-player title to challenge the console gaming space.

Han Dong-hoon led the development of Mistover at Krafton. The creation of the world and lore of Mistover took precedence during its development, and the game's visual aesthetics were derived out of the premise afterwards. James Han, a producer for Mistover, described the game world as being "on the verge of extinction" and that "one wrong choice may prove fatal". The art style and gameplay mechanics of Mistover, which Lee described as a blend of elements from survival games and tactical role-playing games, emulate that of Darkest Dungeon and Etrian Mystery Dungeon due to their popular appeal with player audiences in many parts of the world. Lee said the game was intentionally designed to have a slow pace when it comes to exploration and combat during its early stages, and that players must carefully weight every action later as they will eventually have consequences. The most important roguelike mechanic for the developers is permadeath, which reflects the bleakness of the setting's in-universe role. The developers wanted to create a feeling of adventure and peril, and give Mistover players the feeling of accomplishment when finishing a dungeon, which need to be dangerous in order to create a challenge for players. Han said their goal was to create a feeling of adventure and peril for Mistover players, as if "they are on the edge of a precipice and try to make the best decisions along with the gameplay to survive and save humanity", and impart the feeling of accomplishment when they finishing a dungeon. Lee said that Mistover has other elements which sets it part from similar games in the market, such as gameplay mechanics involving the mist phenomena, the Light Flowers, and "Cursed Weapons".

Each character class was designed to feature distinct skills and abilities, with the intention that the variety of gameplay options they provide would offer "nearly infinite" replay value. Although party members are player-created and randomly generated, their appearances and backstories are fixed. For example, the exclusively female Sister character archetype has an eccentric personality and becomes "enthusiastic" when she is attacked: this is due to her origin story as an ordinary person who heard a voice she believed to be "God" at the brink of death. Because the visual aesthetics for each character were created to fit their specific backstories, customizable graphical appearances that feature alternate designs were not a priority for the development team, although Lee indicated that they were open to player feedback on features like color variations.

A demo version of the game was showcased at video game conventions, which was designed to be a "truncated, easier version" to make it more accessible and less intimidating for audiences. After collecting and evaluating player feedback on Mistover from events, such as PAX East 2019 and NicoNico Choukaigi in Japan, Kraton uploaded a post on September 18, 2019 which detailed changes that would be implemented into the game. Mistover launched in the following month on October 10 for all intended release platforms. A physical release was launched in the Asian region for PlayStation 4 and Nintendo Switch, with Korean, English, Japanese and Chinese language options.

A crossover collaboration with the Guilty Gear video game series, titled Dr. Faust's Otherworldly Adventure, was released as paid downloadable content (DLC) on March 12, 2020. Described as "comedy and lunacy" in tone, the DLC features a dungeon called "Wandering Dr. Faust's Forest", new monsters, new consumable items that will not be contaminated by the Mist, and recurring Guilty Gear series character Faust as its titular boss character, and new Achievements or Trophies for Steam and the PlayStation Network respectively. The DLC pack was originally intended to be exclusive to the physical release of the game's Japanese version, before Krafton confirmed in November 2019 that it would be available as a standalone purchase for the general public.

Mistover was delisted from all digital storefronts on June 30, 2022.

== Reception ==
Reception

Aggregate score
Aggregator	Score
Metacritic	NS: 62/100

Review scores
Publication	Score
Nintendo Life	5/10
Nintendo World Report	7/10
RPGamer	6/10
IGN Japan	7.3/10

Mistover received mixed or average reviews on the Nintendo Switch according to review aggregator Metacritic. Jordan Rudek from Nintendo World Report lauded Mistover as one of the most fun dungeon crawlers he has ever played the game's "tense dungeon exploration and positional RPG combat" as incredible. However, he felt that its heavy reliance on the applications of randomness for its mechanics, especially the random generation of characters, formed an overall inconsistent gameplay experience that undermines the game's appeal, which held the game back "from excellent to merely pretty good". Reviewing the PC version of Mistover, Mike Moehnke from RPGamer noted that his inability to find a roguelike video game that he would enjoy was likely what led to his "muted reaction" towards the game because it borrows several conventional mechanics from that genre, but found that some of its aspects were admirable enough for him to appreciate. PJ O'Reilly from Nintendo Life gave Mistover a mediocre review and called the game a derivative product of the "expertly-crated" and "sublime" Darkest Dungeon, which in his opinion "overshadows it in every possible way". He liked the strong "anime/gothic art-style" of Mistover and its flawless performance on the Nintendo Switch, but highlighted multiple major issues in his criticism, including its repetitive and grindy combat, a lack of atmosphere for its dungeon-crawling, and a punitive and restrictive gameplay systems which never lets the player feel rewarded.

With regards to the game's difficulty, IGN Japan cautioned that the harsh mechanics and high difficulty are meant only for players who are looking for a serious challenge, in spite of the cute factor of its characters. Rudek believed that players who are looking for a "more consistent or relaxed experience" should avoid the game, but otherwise individuals who are willing to invest time and effort in the gameplay loop of Mistover may find it a worthwhile thrill. Alistair Wong from Siliconera argued that Mistover "never feels unfair" even though the odds are stacked heavily against the player, and that it would be much appreciated by players who are want a "masochistic experience" and the "thrill of overcoming it all". Moehnke concurred that its intended audience of hardcore video game enthusiasts may find its gameplay loop to be "highly addictive".

Commenting on the delisting of Mistover from digital storefronts, Paige Chamberlain from RPG Site lamented that the game would be "lost to the mists of time and licensing issues" and remarked that while it is far from a masterpiece, Mistover is "an interesting blend" of influences "with some rather rough edges".
