= Devilian =

2015 massively multiplayer online video game

- Developer: Bluehole Ginno Games (later PUBG Studios)
- Publisher: Trion Worlds-Krafton
- Engine: Unreal Engine 4
- Platform: Microsoft Windows
- Release: WW: 10 December 2015
- Genre: Action role-playing
- Mode: Multiplayer

Devilian was a fantasy massively multiplayer online action role-playing video game (MMOARPG) developed by Bluehole Ginno Games and published by Trion Worlds. In the game, the player assumes the role of a half-devil, known as a Devilian, which has two forms, a normal form and a devil form, which level up individually. The game was released on Steam on 10 December 2015. On January 19, 2018, it was announced that the game would be discontinued on March 5, 2018.

== Reception ==
On Metacritic, Devilian holds an aggregated score of 63/100, based on six critic reviews.
