= Ascend to Zero =

Ascend to ZERO
- Developer: Flyway Games
- Publisher: Flyway Games KRAFTON
- Composers: INFX; Ando; MIIM
- Platforms: Windows, Xbox Series X/S
- Release: July 13, 2026
- Genre: Role-playing video game; strategy; action roguelike
- Mode: Single-player

Ascend to Zero (stylized as Ascend to ZERO) is a roguelike-style action-strategy game developed by Flyway Games and published by Krafton. The game was released on July 13, 2026.

== Gameplay ==
The gameplay in Ascend to Zero combines chaotic survival with automatic attacks in the "bullet hell" style, with combat that is heavily focused on tactical repositioning and strict time management.

== Development and release ==
Ascend to Zero was created by Flyway Games, a creative studio founded in 2023 by Krafton. The first official trailer announcing and revealing the game was released worldwide on March 26, 2026.

Ascend to Zero was released on 13 July 2026. It was released with digital soundtrack and Supporter Pack DLC that adds avatar skins.

== Reception ==
Reception

Aggregate scores
Aggregator	Score
Metacritic	82/100 (Note: Based on 11 reviews)
OpenCritic	73% recommend (Note: Based on 11 reviews)
