= Krafton =

South Korean video game company

KRAFTON, Inc.
- Native name: 주식회사 크래프톤
- Type: Public
- Traded as: KRX: 259960
- Industry: Video games
- Founded: 5 November 2018; 8 years ago
- Headquarters: Gangnam District, Seoul, South Korea
- Key people: Kim Chang-han (CEO); Chang Byung-gyu (chairman)
- Revenue: ₩2.7 trillion US$19.0 billion (2024)
- Owner: Chang Byung-gyu (14.89%); Tencent/Image Frame Investment (13.86%); National Pension Service (7.10%); Treasury stock (6.95%)
- Number of employees: ≥3400
- Subsidiaries: Bluehole Studio; PUBG Studios; Striking Distance Studios; RisingWings; Dreamotion Inc.; Thingsflow; Unknown Worlds Entertainment; 5minlab Corporation; Neon Giant; Krafton Montreal; Overdare; OmniCraft Labs; ReLU Games; Flyway Games; Tango Gameworks; InZOI Studio; Celsius Online; JofSoft; Eleventh Hour Games; ADK Holdings; Ludo Robotics
- Website: krafton.com

KRAFTON, Inc. (Korean: 주식회사 크래프톤) is a South Korean video game publisher and holding company based in Seoul. It was created in November 2018 to serve as the parent company for Bluehole, founded by Chang Byung-gyu in Seoul in March 2007, and its subsidiaries. The company has published several notable video game titles including TERA, PUBG: Battlegrounds, and inZOI.

== History ==
Following the success of PUBG: Battlegrounds, which had led to both investment from Tencent Holdings, and expansion and acquisition of studios, Bluehole opted to establish Krafton on November 5th 2018, to serve as a holding company for its video game properties. "Krafton" was selected based on the names of craft guilds of the Middle Ages. Kim Chang-han, the CEO of the PUBG Corporation (current PUBG Studios) that developed PlayerUnknown's Battlegrounds, was named as CEO for Krafton.

The company announced its plans to file for an initial public offering in July 2021, filing its initial approval for listing on the Korea Stock Exchange in April 2021. The firm planned to raise ₩5.6 trillion (US$5 billion) at a market valuation of ₩30 trillion (US$27.2 billion). The IPO was held on 10 August 2021; while its value dropped by 8.8% from the original asking price at the end of trading, it still ended with Krafton being valued at US$19.32 billion.

In 2026, Krafton announced a partnership with Hanwha Aerospace to jointly develop physical AI technologies and establish a joint venture. The two companies will invest in a $1 billion fund established by Hanwha Asset Management focused on AI, robotics and defense. CEO Kim Chang-han said the joint venture could grow into a global defense technology firm like Anduril.

== Subsidiaries ==
Bluehole has acquired several development studios since its founding. On 5 November 2018, all subsidiaries were reorganized under one parent company: Krafton Game Union.

=== Bluehole Studio ===
Logo of Bluehole Studio

Bluehole Studio was founded in Seoul in March 2007 by Chang Byung-gyu. Chang previously established Neowiz in 1997, along seven other co-founders, moved on to found search engine developer First Snow in 2005, and sold that venture in 2006. The company announced on 22 April 2015 that they had changed their name to simply Bluehole.

In August 2017, Chinese holding company Tencent announced that it had, following a rejected acquisition bid, invested an undisclosed amount of money into Bluehole. Bluehole initially denied that any investment had been made, but later stated that they were in talks with Tencent in multiple partnerships, including the acquisition of an equity stake in Bluehole by Tencent. Subsequently, Tencent acquired 1.5% of Bluehole for a total of ₩70 billion. Tencent reaffirmed their intents to fully acquire Bluehole in November 2017. Korean magazine The Korea Times suggested that an initial public offering, through which Bluehole would become a public company, was "out of question" due to Chang Byung-gyu's position as chairman of both Bluehole and the Fourth Industrial Revolution committee. At the time, 38 Communications, a company that tracks unlisted Korean stocks, valued the company at ₩5.2 trillion. Tencent plans to invest further ₩500 billion to acquire further 10% ownership, raising their total stake to 11.5%.

=== PUBG Studios ===
Logo of PUBG Studios

PUBG Studios (formerly Ginno Games, Bluehole Ginno Games and PUBG Corporation) is an internal studio of Bluehole's that developed one of the establishing battle royale games, PlayerUnknown's Battlegrounds (PUBG), based on user mods in other games by Brendan "PlayerUnknown" Greene and who was hired by PUBG Studios to develop it into a full title. Originally, Ginno Games had been founded by Kim Chang-han to develop MMOs, but around 2014, he had been forced to lay off a third of his staff as their last product had not performed well. He sold Ginno Games to Bluehole on 27 January 2015, with the sale to close on 27 March that year. At the time, Ginno Games employed 60 people. Ginno Games changed their corporate name to Bluehole Ginno Games in May 2015. Shortly after Bluehole's acquisition in 2015, Chang-han reached out to Greene to offer him support to build out his battle royale at Bluehole Ginno, which Greene accepted. PUBG was first released in early access in March 2017 as a highly popular game. Following the success of PUBG in 2017, Bluehole Ginno Games was renamed PUBG Corporation in September 2017.

A second office was established in Madison, Wisconsin, in late 2017, with two further offices in Amsterdam and Japan opened later. On 12 March 2018, PUBG Corporation acquired New York-based studio MadGlory, which was renamed PUBG MadGlory.

Greene, having been based in the Seoul offices of PUBG Corporation, left that division in March 2019 to lead a new subsidiary, PUBG Special Projects, at the Amsterdam office, later renamed to PUBG Productions. PUBG Productions announced their first game Prologue at The Game Awards 2019 in December. Unrelated to Battlegrounds, Prologue is called an exploration of gameplay and technology, and said "to give players unique and memorable experiences, each and every time they play".

At the end of 2019 Tencent Games announced some big plans for PUBG in India's upcoming future, as well as its general eSports.

Krafton fully merged PUBG Corporation into their internal studio system in December 2020, rebranding the team as PUBG Studios.

On 9 November 2020, it was announced that Krafton will participate in G-Star 2020 to introduce their upcoming multiplayer online game Elyon through Krafton, an e-sports reality show where celebrities and streamers entered a special school that specialized in battlegrounds conduct episodes and talk related to PUBG Series 3. Celebrities (G)I-dle's Song Yuqi and Ailee and streamers Chyo Man and Choi Kwang-won appeared in the show.

In September 2020, the Government of India banned PUBG Mobile in the country along with several apps published by Chinese vendors, in this case Tencent Games, due to data privacy issues. To relaunch the game back in India, Krafton took back the control of Intellectual Property (IP) of the game for the Indian region from Tencent. An aesthetically new version of PUBG Mobile, Battlegrounds Mobile India, was launched on 2 July 2021 for Android and on 18 August 2021 for iOS. This time the game was published by Krafton, Inc.

In February 2021, PUBG Studios announced the development of PUBG: New State, the second installment in the PUBG Universe, set in the future (2051). Drones, shields, weapon customization, neon sights, reviving teammates and 'recruiting' knocked out enemies are just some of the new mechanics in PUBG: New State. The game released on 11 November 2021, and reported through a presentation that to date the game had exceeded 55 million pre-registrations on Google Play and App Store. On 27 January 2022, a name change was announced, going from being called "PUBG: New State" to being called "New State Mobile". According to Krafton this was done to create a unique mobile-centric experience, and through that change they were putting it into practice.

In Fall 2024, Krafton signed a licensing agreement with Pocketpair for Palworld's intellectual property. PUBG Studios announced it has begun developing a mobile version of the game.

=== Striking Distance Studios ===
In June 2019, a new American studio called Striking Distance was opened in conjunction with Glen Schofield, the co-founder of Sledgehammer Games. Striking Distance, headed by Schofield as chief executive officer, was set to develop narrative-driven games based on PUBG. The studio's first game is The Callisto Protocol, a survival horror game. It was originally intended to be set within the PUBG universe but that never went into fruition. It was released on December 2, 2022. In August 2024, the studio announced [REDACTED], a new game set in the Callisto Protocol universe. [REDACTED] was released on 28 October 2024, receiving initial positive reviews.

Striking Distance Studios is headquartered in San Ramon, California.

=== RisingWings ===
RisingWings is a South Korean video game development studio formed by the merger of Pnix and Delusion. RisingWings focuses primarily on casual mobile games. RisingWings is based in Seoul.

=== Dreamotion Inc. ===
Dreamotion is a South Korean video game development studio founded in July 2016. They primarily focus on developing mobile games. Dreamotion was acquired by Krafton on 13 May 2021. The studio's latest game and first console and PC title is the adventure game, My Little Puppy.

=== Thingsflow ===
Thingsflow Inc. an interactive content production company known for Hellobot, a chat-based content platform that allows users to engage with bot-driven characters through dedicated apps and messenger services. As of May 2021, Hellobot has more than four million users throughout Korea and Japan. On 29 June 2021 this company was acquired by Krafton.

=== Unknown Worlds Entertainment ===
Unknown Worlds Entertainment, founded in 2001 in San Francisco, California, is an American video game development studio renowned for titles like Natural Selection and Subnautica. In October 2021, the studio was acquired by Krafton. In August 2022, they announced the development of Moonbreaker, a turn-based strategy game set in a sci-fi universe crafted by author Brandon Sanderson. The game had its full release on February 2, 2024.

The studio has released into early access, their sequel to Subnautica (2018) and Subnautica: Below Zero (2021), Subnautica 2 (2026). During the early access, it will be available only for Windows and Xbox Series X/S.

In July 2025, Krafton announced that Unknown Worlds co-founders Charlie Cleveland and Max McGuire, as well as the CEO Ted Gill, had been replaced by Steve Papoutsis, who previously worked at Striking Distance Studios. The leadership change prompted widespread criticism from the video game community. In a follow-up statement, Krafton stated that the original leadership had been removed due to its alleged abandonment of responsibilities, which the company claimed had caused significant delays in the development of Subnautica 2. Later that month, Cleveland, McGuire and Gill filed a lawsuit against Krafton in response to their firings claiming that their terminations and the delay of the game's early access release were intended to prevent the payment of a previously promised $250 million bonus to the studio.

On March 16, 2026, the Delaware Court of Chancery issued a ruling ordering the reinstatement of Ted Gill as CEO of Unknown Worlds, with "full operational authority." The ruling also stated that Krafton CEO Changhan Kim had in 2025 secretly devised a plan to avoid paying the $250 million performance earnout the company had negotiated with Unknown Worlds in 2021. Changhan Kim followed ChatGPT's advice to renegotiate the terms and attempt to delay the early access release, against the advice of his lawyers.

=== 5minlab Corporation ===
5minlab is a South Korean video game development studio founded in 2013, known for developing Smash Legends, Baam Squad, Toy Clash, among others. It is also known for developing live Q&A broadcast systems and providing AR/VR software and content to large corporations and broadcast companies. This company was acquired by Krafton in February 2022.

Notable games developed by 5minlab after its acquisition by Krafton include Kill the Crows, a fast-paced top-down western arena shooter, and Private Military Manager. The studio is currently developing Dinkum Together, a multiplayer spin-off of the life simulation game Dinkum, by James Bendon. In February 2025, it was announced that Krafton had acquired publishing rights for all titles within the Dinkum IP.

=== Neon Giant ===
In November 2022, it was announced that Krafton had acquired Neon Giant, the Uppsala-based Swedish developer of The Ascent.

=== Krafton Montreal Studio ===
Krafton opened Krafton Montreal Studio, its first Canadian studio, in February 2023. As its first game, the studio is developing Project Windless, a game based on the South Korean fantasy novel The Bird That Drinks Tears by Lee Yeongdo.

=== ReLu Games ===
ReLu Games is a South Korean video game development studio founded internally within Krafton in June 2023 that to develop games that integrate deep learning technology through AI. MJ Kim, the head of the studio, previously Krafton's Special Project II incubation program. Its most recent game is MIMESIS, a co-op survival horror game released on October 27, 2025 for Windows via Steam in early access, and its upcoming title being Scavenger T.O.M., a survival crafting game.

=== Flyway Games ===
Flyway Games is a indie-style South Korean video game development studio founded internally within Krafton best known for Commander Quest, a roguelike deckbuilder/auto battler. Its upcoming games are Ascend to ZERO, an action roguelike, and Waltz and Jam, an action-adventure game.

=== Tango Gameworks ===
On August 11, 2024, Krafton announced their purchase of Tango Gameworks and the intellectual property rights to Hi-Fi Rush from Microsoft Gaming following the studio's closure earlier that June. The development studio acts as Krafton's first video game subsidiary based in Japan, with the rights to previous Tango games remaining with Microsoft Gaming's ZeniMax Media division. Following the acquisition, Krafton plans "to continue developing the Hi-Fi Rush IP and explore future projects", while also forged a strategic partnership with Microsoft, including help integrate Tango among the others Krafton's studios and support future Hi-Fi Rush projects.

=== InZOI Studio ===
In early 2025, it was announced that Krafton had founded InZOI Studio, the development studio behind the simulation game InZOI.

=== JofSoft ===
In June 2025, Krafton announced its first Steam publisher sale, including Pizza Bandit by Korean / USA indie game develepment studio JofSoft, confirming that the studio has recently joined Krafton.

=== Eleventh Hour Games ===
On the 25th July 2025, Krafton announced that it had acquired Last Epoch developer Eleventh Hour Games. The initial purchase price was $96 million.

=== OmniCraft Labs ===
It is an internal game development studio under Krafton, operating out of Seoul and Pangyo, South Korea. Headed by studio head Jeonghwan Roh, the team is actively developing unannounced multi-platform titles, notably a next-generation shooter referred to internally as Project GW and Project Windless

=== Overdare ===
OVERDARE is an AI-powered UGC platform developed and published by the studio.

== Defunct subsidiaries ==
=== L-Time Games ===
L-Time Games was founded in June 2009. The company attracted a ₩2 billion and a ₩5 billion investment from Knet Investment Partners and IMM Investments, respectively. L-Time Games was acquired by and merged into Bluehole in January 2014.

=== Maui Games ===
Maui Games was a mobile game developer founded in 2013 by Woonghee Cho, previously head of business development for Neowiz. Bluehole Studio announced on 16 January 2015 that they were acquiring the company, which was completed in October that year. At Bluehole's January 2017 shareholders' meeting, it was decided that Maui Games would enter liquidation, which was effective immediately. Nine staff members of Maui Games, a fraction of that company's total employee count, were reemployed directly within Bluehole.

=== Pnix ===
Pnix (formerly Bluehole Pnix) was a mobile game developer. The company was founded as Pnix Games in 2012. Bluehole announced that they had acquired Pnix Games, alongside Squall, on 22 April 2015. After becoming a subsidiary of Krafton, Pnix Games changed their corporate name to Bluehole Pnix in June 2016. In 2018, this decision was reversed, and their corporate name was again changed back to Pnix. In 2020, Pnix was merged with Delusion to form RisingWings.

=== Squall ===
Squall (formerly Bluehole Squall) was a mobile game developer. The company was founded as Squall by Park Jin-seok, a founding member of Neowiz, in 2013. Bluehole announced that they had acquired Squall, alongside Pnix Games, on 22 April 2015. After becoming a subsidiary of Krafton, Squall changed their corporate name to Bluehole Squall in March 2016. Similar to Pnix, the name change decision was reversed back to Squall in 2018. It was shut down by Krafton after internal conflicts in 2020.

=== Red Sahara Studio ===
Red Sahara Studio was a mobile game developer headed by Lee Ji-hoon. On 12 March 2018, Bluehole completed the acquisition of the studio in a stock swap deal. Red Sahara was developing a mobile game based on TERA.

=== Delusion ===
Delusion Studio was founded in April 2011 headed by Kang Moon-chul. On 22 June 2018, Bluehole announced the acquisition of the studio. Delusion developed mobile games such as Guardian Stone, Jellipo, House of Mice and, most notably, Castle Burn. In 2020, Delusion was merged with Pnix to form RisingWings.

=== En Masse Entertainment ===
Originally established as Bluehole Interactive in June 2008, En Masse Entertainment served as Krafton's North American publishing arm. On 26 February 2010, the company announced that it had changed its corporate name to En Masse Entertainment.

In September 2020, En Masse Entertainment announced that it would be shutting down its offices after 10 years of service in the gaming industry. Following this decision, Krafton began self-publishing TERA's Console version worldwide, with Gameforge taking over publication of the game’s PC version.

== R&D ==
Krafton AI, headquartered in Seoul, is a research and development center focused on advancing deep learning technologies. Research directions include vision and animation, language models, voice synthesis, and reinforcement learning.

At CES 2025, Krafton introduced two deep learning-based game technologies developed in collaboration with NVIDIA: PUBG Ally and Smart Zoi. Smart Zois are included in the early access version of InZOI, together with other deep learning-powered solutions such as the 3D printer, to generate 3D assets from images, and more. PUBG Ally is available through PUBG Arcade for two weeks in 2026, from mid June to the end of the month.

In April 2025, Krafton and NVIDIA discussed deepening their collaboration, with focus on Agentic AI and Embodied AI.

In March 2026, Krafton announced a new subsidiary focused on physical AI, Ludo Robotics, led by Krafton's CEO.

As of August 2026, Ludo Robotics was developing an AI agent system for humanoid robots called Ludi, with an initial version, Ludi 0.1, being integrated into physical humanoid units, and a more advanced version, Ludi 1.0, planned for release by the end of the year. Ludi 0.1 consists of a 4-billion-parameter vision-language model paired with three sub-modules for action, voice, and navigation. Unlike competitors that have focused primarily on hardware, Ludo Robotics has prioritized "social intelligence"—the ability to interpret human intent, social norms, and situational context—as a core differentiator, with the goal of applications in household tasks such as laundry monitoring and beverage retrieval.

== Supported studios and companies ==
Krafton supports various studios and companies worldwide, including:

- EF Games, Madrid, Spain
- Spoonlabs, Seoul, South Korea
- Wolf Haus Games, Montreal, Canada
- IMM Investment's India fund
- Ruckus Games, Frisco, Texas
- Cashfree, Bengaluru, India
- Nautilus Mobile, Pune, India
- Neptune (Kakao Games subsidiary), South Korea

In April 2025, Krafton announced Blue Ocean Games, a $30 million venture capital fund. The mission of the fund is to support about 100 indie game developers over three years.

In 2026, Krafton, in collaboration with Naver Corporation and Mirae Asset Securities, launched a growth investment fund focused on technology startups in India. The "Unicorn Growth Fund" will be begin with initial investments of around $137 million each from Krafton and Naver, but expects to eventually deploy around $670 million over four years.

In May 2026, it is announced that Krafton became the third-largest shareholder in SOCAR, a Korean company providing car sharing services. SOCAR and Krafton announced plans to establish Apex Mobility, an autonomous driving company valued at approximately 150 billion won, with the aim of gradually launching robotaxi and autonomous car-sharing services.

== Games ==
=== Games developed or published as "Bluehole Studio" ===
Title	Year	Developer	Notes
TERA	2011	Bluehole Studio	Developer only. Shut down on 30 June 2022 (Console edition still active)
Devilian	2015	Bluehole Studio	Originally published by Devilian, later by Krafton. Shut down on 5 March 2018.
Mini Golf King	2017	Bluehole Studio	
PUBG: Battlegrounds	2017	PUBG Studios	
Road to Valor: World War II	2019	Bluehole Studio	
Elyon	2020	Bluehole Studio	Developer only. Shut down globally on 19 September 2023

=== Games developed or published as "Krafton" ===
Year	Title	Developer	Notes
2018	PUBG Mobile	LightSpeed & Quantum Studio	Publisher in Korea & Japan only.
2019	Mistover	Krafton	
2021	Battlegrounds Mobile India	Krafton	Publisher in India only
2021	New State Mobile	PUBG Studios	Originally released as "PUBG: New State"
2021	Thunder Tier One	Krafton	
2021	Ronin: The Last Samurai	Dreamotion Inc.	
2022	The Callisto Protocol	Striking Distance Studios	
2022	Road to Valor: Empires	Dreamotion Inc.	
2023	Defense Derby	Rising Wings	
2023	Kill The Crows	5minlab	
2024	Garuda Saga	Alchemist Games Inc.	Publisher in India only.
2024	Bullet Echo India	ZeptoLab	Publisher in India only.
2024	Moonbreaker	Unknown Worlds Entertainment	In 2022 in early access
2024	[REDACTED]	Striking Distance Studios	
2024	Uncover the Smoking Gun	ReLU Games	
2024	Magical Mic Duel: Senpai, Hear My Spell	ReLU Games	
2024	Cookie Run India	Devsisters	Publisher in India only.
2025	Dark and Darker Mobile	Bluehole	Soft launch on February 4 (Canada and US)
2025	Commander Quest	Flyway Games	
2025	Private Military Manager: Tactical Auto Battler	5minlab	
2025	Pizza Bandit	JOFSOFT	
2025	inZOI	inZOI Studio	Early access release: 28 March 2025
2025	Hi-Fi Rush	Tango Gameworks	Took over publishing duties from Bethesda
2026	PUBG: Blindspot	ARC Team, PUBG Studios	
2026	Ascend to ZERO	Flyway Games	
TBA	WPCA: World Phasebound Control Authority	5minlab	
TBA	Scavenger T.O.M	ReLU Games	
TBA	Project ZETA	Nirvanana	
TBA	PUBG: DED.NET	PUBG Madison, PUBG Studios	
TBA	No Law	Neon Giant	Announced at The Game Awards 2025
TBA	Project Windless	Krafton Montreal Studio	Based on The Bird That Drinks Tears, a Korean novel series
TBA	Age Twisters	Piccolo Studio	
TBA	TARAE: The Unbound	Boundary	
TBA	Hi-Fi Rush 2	Tango Gameworks	
TBA	Rivals Hover League	EF Games	Announced in March 2025

== Criticism ==
=== Handling "stream sniping" at PUBG Asia Stars 2026 ===
Opened on 17 September 2026, PUBG Asia Stars is an online gaming tournament featuring players and content creators (streamers) from six countries and territories, including: South Korea, China, Japan, Thailand, Taiwan, and Vietnam. The incident involving Vietnamese players Himass and TanVuu stemmed from allegations made by Soopi, a streamer and player for a South Korean PUBG team. She accused the two Vietnamese players of "stream sniping"—using information from public live streams to determine an opponent's location, path, or tactics during an active match. Consequently, the organizers took disciplinary action against Himass and TanVuu, including disqualification and the revocation of their "PUBG Vietnam Partner" status.

Some Vietnamese players and fans were reported to have mocked South Korea on social media. Some accounts also posted sexually harassing comments targeting female players on the South Korean team, leading to further controversy and reactions on social media.

On 20 September 2026, Krafton, the publisher of PUBG, announced its findings and admitted to having "hastily released unverified information" regarding the incident. According to the publisher, players Himass and TanVuu received external information via the chat function of a livestream while competing. However, whether the two players actively watched their opponents' livestreams to gain a competitive advantage remains under investigation. Controversy deepened as a segment of the Vietnamese PUBG community raised suspicions that Soopi might have cheated during the match in question. Footage showed the streamer with multiple browser windows open simultaneously. Soopi denied the cheating allegations and requested that Krafton revoke her "PUBG Partner" status following online backlash. She also took down content related to the incident from streaming platforms. The situation escalated further when all eight members of the South Korean delegation withdrew from the second day of competition. South Korean media reported that some sponsors had suspended or postponed promotional activities linked to the event. Krafton decided not to hold the remaining matches, resulting in the early conclusion of PUBG Asia Stars 2026; no final rankings were recognized, and the US$70,000 prize pool was distributed equally among the participating regions. On the evening of 21 September 2026 (Indochina Time), Krafton issued an apology, accepting responsibility for operational and communication errors regarding the incident. Yoon Su Jin, head of the PUBG publishing division, also acknowledged Krafton's responsibility for the event. Following the incident at PUBG Asia Stars 2026, the reaction within the Vietnamese PUBG community continued to spread. On 22 September 2026, TanVuu uninstalled PUBG during a livestream, while Himass downloaded the game Delta Force. Various KOLs, streamers, and other players also moved to abandon PUBG PC, drawing attention to the community's response to the game in Vietnam.

On the afternoon of 23 September 2026 (Indochina Time), Krafton, the publisher of PUBG: Battlegrounds, announced the results of an investigation confirming that two players—Himass (Anyone’s Legend) and TanVu (GAM The Expendables)—had committed serious violations of the game's operational policies. According to a statement posted on the official PUBG: Battlegrounds website, following an investigation based on match data, replays, and live-stream footage, Krafton confirmed that the two players had obtained external information and engaged in "stream sniping" while matches were in progress. Krafton stated that this decision was reached after reviewing the investigation findings. The players were found to have violated PUBG: Battlegrounds operational policies, specifically regulations regarding the misuse of information, the compromise of game fairness, and the standards of conduct expected of professional players. Krafton emphasized that, as professional players, Himass and TanVu are required to uphold standards of fairness, responsibility, and sportsmanship. However, the announcement noted that the players retain the right to appeal the disciplinary measures in accordance with established esports procedures.

The reaction to this incident in Vietnam was reported to extend beyond the player and professional gaming communities. Some gaming centers, esports clubs, and businesses took actions related to the game, such as removing it from computers or restricting employees from playing it.
