= Last War: Survival Game =

2023 video game

Last War: Survival Game is a multiplayer mobile strategy game developed by First Fun and later published by FUNFLY PTE. LTD, released in August 2023. The game sets in a post-apocalyptic zombie setting, featuring base building, hero recruitment, and resource management.

The game achieved over $2 billion in lifetime revenue by February 2025 and become one of the top five highest-grossing mobile games of 2024. However, the game was also controversial for its refund policy.

== Development ==
Last War: Survival Game was originally developed by First Fun HK LTD

Development and publishing responsibilities were later transferred to FUNFLY PTE. LTD., a Singapore-based company incorporated in February 2024.

The development team also developed Top War: Battle Game, which generated approximately $1.1 billion in lifetime revenue. Tencent maintains an investment stake of approximately 10.71% in the original development company, Beijing Yuanqu Entertainment Co., Ltd.

== Servers, community, and alliances ==
The social ecosystem of Last War: Survival is driven by player-led alliances.

== Commercial performance ==
Last War: Survival Game started with $287,000 in revenue during its August 2023 launch month but experienced explosive growth throughout 2024. The game's monthly revenue increased from $30 million in January 2024 to $138 million by December 2024, representing a 360% growth rate.

== Marketing strategy ==
Last War: Survival Game partnered with actor Antony Starr for a major Q4 2024 campaign that directly addressed the "misleading ads" controversy with the tagline "It's called Last War. It's going viral because the developers made a real game based off the fake game in the ads." The campaign generated over 12.5 million downloads and propelled the game to #1 most downloaded in the US.
