= Arena Breakout =

2022 video game

- Developer: Tencent Games Morefun Studios
- Publisher: Level Infinite
- Designer: Hu Jie [117]
- Engine: Unreal Engine 4
- Platforms: Microsoft Windows; iOS; Android
- Release: July 13, 2022
- Genres: First-person shooter, extraction shooter
- Mode: Multiplayer

Arena Breakout is a first-person extraction shooter video game developed by Tencent Games Morefun Studios. Arena Breakout was released by Tencent Games in mainland China on July 13, 2022, and globally by Level Infinite on July 14, 2023, for iOS and Android platforms. The game was released on Microsoft Windows at the end of 2024 under the name Arena Breakout: Infinite, and an early access version was released on August 13 of that year.

The game's core gameplay is tactical combat, with a hardcore, realistic design. Players must equip a certain amount of equipment before starting the game. They use this equipment to battle other players and the environment within the game map, collecting valuable items as they explore before returning. If a player dies in the game, they lose most of their equipment. The game also introduces features such as ray tracing and frame prediction. Many reviewers praised the gameplay, art, and user interface design, but some media outlets criticized the game's high learning curve and its poorly designed in-app purchase model

== Gameplay ==
Arena Breakout is a tactical first-person shooter game, incorporating survival and life simulation elements. While players can engage in player-versus-player battles by shooting or other means, the goal is to escape with valuable in-game items, rather than defeating as many other players as possible. Before each game begins, players must choose their weapons, ammunition, and other equipment to bring with them into the map. On some maps, there is a cap for how valuable the player's gear is. If it is too expensive, they are barred entry from that zone. If they die in-game, they will lose most of their items, except in secure cases. The game features high-end supply areas where players can explore and loot more valuable items, but this also carries a higher risk of death. Enemy NPCs are more hostile and better geared in these areas, and the number of high-level players are higher. Extraction points are located throughout the map, and players must reach them within a specified timeframe to complete the game. In addition to the game, this game features an economic system. Players can sell loot collected in-game for Koen, an in-game currency, which can be traded with the system or other players to purchase additional equipment and play again.

The number of bullets remaining in a gun is only displayed after pressing the inspect magazine button, showing the player a vague number. When the player is not aiming, a virtual crosshair function is available. Arena Breakout contains 48 types of guns, modeled after the mechanical structure of real guns. The game features over 700 gun accessories, with each gun capable of equipping over 10 types of accessories, each granting different attribute bonuses. There is a variety of bullet types, each affecting the player's shooting damage and other attributes. In the game's health system, different parts of the character's body are calculated separately. Attacks to different parts will result in different negative statuses, such as leg damage slowing the character's movement speed. If the health of the head or chest reaches zero, the character will die. The players can use medical items to heal their characters, or consume food and water to meet their physiological needs.

== Development ==
Arena Breakout was developed by Morefun Studios, a subsidiary of Tencent Games, using Unreal Engine 4. As of its release date, Arena Breakout had been in development for two and a half years, while Arena Breakout: Infinite took over three years. The development team consists of fewer than 100 people, but studio president Zhang Hanjin has invested significant resources in the project. The game's "Arena" map, inspired by American novelist Tom Clancy, is designed to create a sense of tension. The mobile version of this game is designed to match the quality of the PC version. During development, the team referenced the design of the similar game Escape from Tarkov. They also identified a lack of clarity in the product form and drew on its experience.

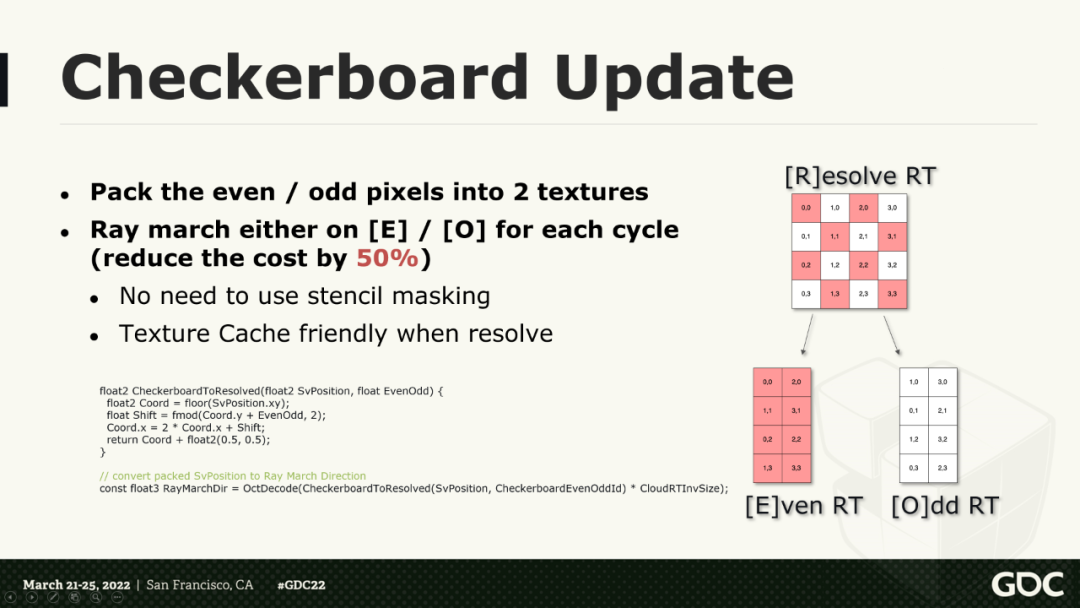
Checkerboard updates group odd-numbered and even-numbered pixels into two groups, using only one of the groups for each update instead of calculating all pixels, thus reducing the computational effort by half.

In terms of rendering, Arena Breakout uses physically-based rendering and Vulkan to enable low-cost ray tracing on mobile devices. Managing ray tracing scenes was a major challenge for developers creating ray tracing features. By calculating the distance from the character's viewpoint to the model, they retrieved and eliminated some unnecessary calculations, improving rendering performance. They eliminated the power-intensive shader lookup table and below-the-horizon light calculations in the game's weather system to reduce power consumption. In the cloud creation process, they first completed the modeling for the cloud and used "chessboard update" technology to reduce rendering calculations by half.

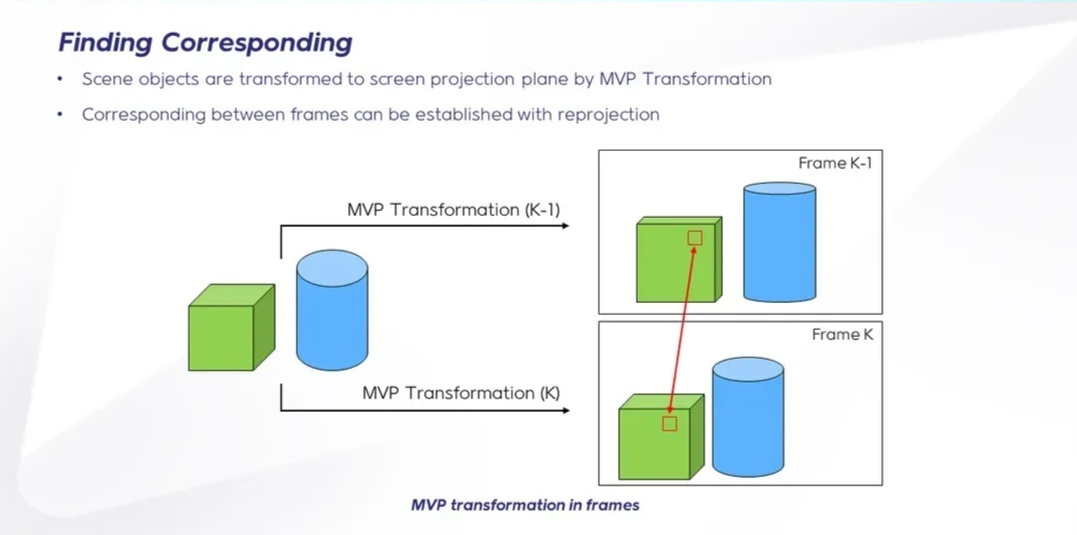
In two consecutive rendered frames, the rendering results of the green cube and the red-marked area are exactly the same. The second frame can use the calculation results of the previous frame to avoid repeated calculations.

To improve the game's frame rate and reduce power consumption, the project team conducted a series of technical research and development for this game. They first tried deep learning and video interpolation, but abandoned them due to issues such as excessive power consumption and image response delay. Since the rendering results of the static model in two consecutive frames of the game are very similar, the project team predicted the next frame and reused the previous calculation results, avoiding repeated calculations and improving program performance.

== Release ==
Arena Breakout was released in China by Tencent Games on July 13, 2022, and globally by Level Infinite on July 14, 2023 on iOS and Android platforms. The game was released on Microsoft Windows in late 2024 under the title Arena Breakout: Infinite, with an Early Access release on August 13, 2024. Arena Breakout: Infinite was then promoted at Gamescom 2024.

== Reception ==
The media outlets were mixed on the game's overly hardcore and realistic gameplay design. PC Gamer's Jake Tucker believed the game's greatest success was in making it easy to learn without sacrificing the gameplay experience. Forbes reviewer Mike Stubbs believes the game should improve the character movement, improve the cheat restriction system and optimize character spawn locations. Arena Breakout's technical aspect was praised by IGN, noting that the game runs smoothly on lower-spec devices.

Arena Breakout's payment model has been a point of contention, where the players can purchase in-game currency to obtain better equipment. Dot Esports's Mateusz Miter argues that being impossible for the players to permanently retain purchased items is a major design flaw. Stubbs believes there's a significant gap between the players who pay and others.

Furthermore, the developer of Escape from Tarkov, has accused the game of plagiarism on social media. In his response, Sun Yiming stated that while the game borrows many elements from Escape from Tarkov, it also differs significantly from it.

Eight hours after Arena Breakout's release, it reached number one in over 100 regions on the App Store platform and reached the top ten in an additional 52 regions. A month after its release, the game surpassed 80 million registered users.
