= Dragon Raja =

Series of fantasy novels by Lee Youngdo

- Cover art for the first volume
- Author: Lee Youngdo
- Cover artist: Paperback - Jung Bohwan; hardcover - Lee Su-yeon, Kim Hyeong-gyun
- Language: Korean
- Series: Lee Youngdo's Dragon Raja
- Genre: Fantasy novel
- Published: 1998 (Golden Bough) (paperback); 2008 (Golden Bough) (hardcover)
- Publication place: South Korea
- Media type: Print (hardcover and paperback); Audiobook; E-book
- ISBN: 89-8273-052-4 (paperback, 12 volumes); 978-89-60172579 (hardcover, 8 volumes)
- Preceded by: A Scene from a Laboratory
- Followed by: Future Walker

Dragon Raja (Korean: 드래곤 라자, Chinese: 龍族, Japanese: ドラゴンラジャー) is the first series of fantasy web novels written in 1998 by Lee Youngdo, a widely recognized author in South Korean fantasy and science fiction literature. The books chronicle the adventures of a 17-year-old boy Hutch Nedval, his mentor Karl Heltant, and his friend Sanson Percival, all of whom are from the poor town of Fief Heltant in the Kingdom of Bysus. The main story arc, told in the first-person by Hutch, concerns the three's quest to rescue their people from the black dragon Amurtaht by finding money to pay the ransom; then to find and protect a lost Dragon Raja girl, who would serve as the bridge between people and dragons and stop a crimson dragon that terrorized the continent 20 years ago.

Lee showcased his first chapters of Dragon Raja on October 3, 1997, on a serial forum of an online service provider, HiTel. For the duration of 6 months after the initial debut he updated approximately 12,000 pages of wongoji (a Korean form of Genkō yōshi), a material length equivalent to that of 1715 letter pages, and the story quickly gained popularity. Golden Bough, an imprint of Minumsa Publishing Group purchased the publishing rights, and Dragon Raja was published upon its completion in 12 paperback volumes.

Prior to 1998 the fantasy genre in Korea, specifically its medievalist form, was considered unsubstantial and unaccounted for by many, especially the press and the literary world. But Dragon Raja was an immediate success, and became a bestseller fantasy title in Korea. In 2011, Dragon Raja was reported as having sold close to 2 million copies in 4 languages.

The success of Dragon Raja prompted two big phenomena in the Korean publishing industry. First, fantasy literature "gained the attention of publishers and writers as the new goldmine" and opened the new era for Korean fantasy market. Speculative fiction also gained more support in the literary world, and more writers of "serious literature" began using fantasy and science fiction elements in their works. Secondly, the amount of online serials getting published increased greatly, in mostly "genre literature" (장르문학; genre munhak), which is a Korean umbrella term for genre of novels including romance, fantasy, wuxia, science fiction and mystery. Once published, it also took relatively less time for such web fiction, or "Internet literature" (인터넷문학; Inteonet munhak), to be adapted into other media, and also in more varied forms. Dragon Raja was adapted into video games, radio drama, and school textbooks.

== Plot ==
Iruril depicted by Suhwan Han, for the promotional poster of the Dragon Raja Online game

This plot summary follows the eight-volume structure of the 2008 hardcover edition.

In the first volume, The Horse Charging Into Dawn, a black dragon named Amurtaht terrorizes Fief Heltant, leading the king to dispatch the white dragon Catselprime and his Dragon Raja that connects dragons and humans to subdue her. When Catselprime is killed and survivors are taken hostage, Amurtaht demands a massive ransom. Hutch Nedval gets a powerful artifact from the mage Tyburn and sets out for the capital with Karl Heltant and Sanson Percival to report the loss and seek aid. Along the way, they battle orcs, gain allies such as the elf Iruril and the dwarf Axelhand, and free a city from a crooked magician Aphnaidel.

In the second volume The Grand Mage Pelleil and the Fifty Kids, In Fief Carlyle, the group encounters a magical plague linked to Djipenian military experiments involving a cursed zone named “Sacred Land.” Together with troll priestess Edelin and mage Pelleil, they expose the scheme led by vampire sorceress Sione and capture the Djipenian spy Unchai as evidence. On their way to the capital, the party meets Neria, a red-haired thief, and Gilsian, a bull-riding warrior later revealed to be the king’s exiled brother.

Volumes 3 and 4, The Black Hand of Vengeance and The Girl by the Port depict rising political turmoil around the Dragon Raja. The group informs King Nilsian Bysus of Amurtaht's ransom and the Djipenian threat, but the king cannot provide the ransom due to the awakening of Kradmesser with a violent history in Brown Mountains near the dwarves' mines. They seek House Halshteil’s lost daughter Lenni, believed to be a powerful Raja, while navigating conspiracies involving traitor Nexon Huritchell and Marquis Halshteil. Traveling to the Archduchy of Ilse, they confirm Lenni’s identity as Raja with Teperi's priest Jeraint, but Nexon and Sione strike again, turning cities into Sacred Lands and abducting Lenni.

In the fifth volume, The Stars Bestow Light on Those Who Gaze the party pursues Nexon into the Eternal Forest, and experience a magical anomaly that splits their identities into fragmented duplicates. They escape the forest with Iruril’s help, but Nexon kills his duplicates and ends up losing parts of himself. The party follows Nexon and Lenni into the Dragon Lord's Great Labyrinth, where they obtain treasure sufficient to pay Amurtaht’s ransom. An encounter with a lich puts them in a misunderstanding with the blue dragon Jigoleid over the death of his hatchling. After the situation is cleared, they discover that a Raja from House Halshteil released Jigoleid from their bond on the Djipenian front, causing serious repercussions in the war.

In the sixth volume, Looking Ahead While Thinking Back, the party races toward the Brown Mountains while contending with Nexon and Halshteil’s forces. Along the way, they defeat pursuing orcs at a desert fortress and witness Bysus descend into chaos as the front lines weaken, Sacred Lands spread, and refugees flee.

In the seventh volume, Elegy of the Archmage, Marquis Halshteil intends to contract a Raja from Halshteil with Kradmesser and seize power. As factions clash, revelations unfold about betrayals against the archmage Handrake from 300 years ago; he helped King Luterino, the first king of Bysus to free the stars of eight races from dragon rule, but the king betrayed him and destroyed the stars except for the dragon's. The vampire Sione was Handrake's disciple but bit him on his deathbed, and he has since survived as a vampire using ancient tattoo spells.

In the eighth and final volume, The Dragon Soaring Into Dusk, the latter half shifts to a reflective narrative from Hutch’s perspective, recounting events as memories rather than in strict chronological order. At Kradmesser’s lair, a three-way confrontation unfolds. The crimson dragon awakens peacefully, refusing either to bond with Lenni or to destroy Bysus. Nexon, as the son of Kradmesser's previous Raja, compels the dragon to form a bond hoping to control him, only to realize too late that a Raja cannot command a dragon. Sione kills Nexon to push the bonded dragon into madness. Iruril proposes that Jigoleid and Lenni form a bond to stop Kradmesser, and together with the party they slay the maddened dragon after intense battles. In the aftermath, Marquis Halshteil’s forces attempt to silence Hutch’s group to hide their treachery, during which Gilsian is fatally wounded protecting Hutch and entrusts Bysus’s future to Karl. The party returns to the capital, where Karl secures stability among nobility by portraying Halshteil as a fallen hero. Back in Heltant, it is revealed that Tyburn is the Archmage Handrake, creator of the Dragon Raja, who had hoped dragons could complement human flaws, though his plan failed. Hutch pays Amurtaht’s ransom and frees the hostages, later sending Amurtaht far west to shield her from human influence, leaving her as a potential force of judgment should humanity fail to change.

== Development, publication and reception ==
=== Development ===
In the summer of 1997, Lee was reading and began daydreaming, "in this world wouldn't there be beings other than humanity? What is the humanity's identity?" Lee began thinking of a world where humans and those who are not humans lead intertwined lives. On October 3, Lee posted the first chapter of Dragon Raja to a forum where he logged in frequently to read others' works.

Lee's story soon attracted thousands of readers, who waited every day for Lee's new chapter. Lee posted usually well after midnight, partly because he had to avoid the unstableness of high traffic, to upload his daily quota, which was 25+ pages on average. The queuing fans called themselves zombies, and Lee their Necromancer, waking them from their sleep every night to check if Lee has posted yet.

=== Publication ===
Lee Youngdo's rapid writing pace during Dragon Raja's initial serialization on Hitel drew immediate attention from publishers. Within a month, multiple publishing houses contacted him, and four months later, he traveled to Seoul to finalize his first publishing deal with Golden Bough, an imprint of Minumsa Publishing Group. Upon completion, the novel was released in twelve volumes beginning in 1998 and quickly became a commercial success. Dragon Raja was later translated and published in Hong Kong and Taiwan as 龍族(2001), and Japan as ドラゴンラージャ(2006), where all twelve volumes were released with localized editions.

In 2008 Golden Bough published a special 10th anniversary hardcover edition, condensing the original 12 volumes into 8 and incorporating years of reader feedback collected since 2005. The limited collector’s set included a fan-drawn map, a picture book based on the in-story fables, and a wooden case based on a design submitted by an overseas fan. Only 2,000 copies were produced, and pre-orders sold out within minutes of launch.

From December 2021 to December 2022, a full-cast unabridged audiobook adaptation of Dragon Raja was released through Naver Audioclip. Featuring over 30 voice actors and original compositions for all 13 ballads appearing in the novel—plus an additional new song—the production marked the largest-scale audiobook project in Korean publishing history, with an estimated production budget of 300 million KRW (approximately $250,000 USD).

The Japanese editions of Dragon Raja and Future Walker are illustrated by Eiji Kaneda, who is known for his work for the anime series Genesis of Aquarion.

=== Reception ===
Dragon Raja was critically and commercially successful across Asia, sparking the expansion of Korean fantasy literature and inspiring a wave of online serializations to enter mainstream publishing. For the novel's 10th anniversary in 2008, the publisher stated the novel was sold over 1 million copies in Korea, and 800,000 copies abroad in Japan, Taiwan, and Hong Kong combined. As of the early 2010s, the Korean publisher stated working with US and European publishers about translating Dragon Raja into English and more languages but an official publication has not yet materialized.

=== Sequel ===
==== Future Walker ====
In 1999, Lee published a sequel titled Future Walker, set soon after the events of Dragon Raja. The story takes place in the northern kingdom of Hegemonia, where the priestess Mi embarks on a journey to the North Sea after sensing a distortion in time itself. Her path crosses with Unchai and Neria, as the entire world faces a crisis where the future stalls and the past catches up, reviving old monsters and heroes. Through this tale of fixed destinies and temporal collapse, Lee explores profound questions of predestination, choice, and the meaning of life when faced with an unchangeable future. (Note: Future Walker, Vol. 1 "Elegy of A Lost Poet; 사라진 시인의 추모곡" Book introduction by the publisher)

Future Walker has been translated into Chinese and Japanese, the Japanese version illustrated by Kaneda Eiji, the same artist who illustrated Dragon Raja's Japanese release. In 2011 Golden Bough published a special 10th anniversary hardcover edition.

==== Marks of Shadow ====
Published in 2008 along with the 10th anniversary edition of Dragon Raja, Marks of Shadow (그림자 자국) is set nearly a thousand years after the events of Dragon Raja and Future Walker, in an era when both Dragon Rajas and magic have faded from memory. The elf Iruril visits a human prophet in Bysus to prevent a catastrophic war prophesied to lead to the kingdom’s downfall. However, the foretold future cannot be easily averted, and conflict erupts between humans and dragons over the “Shadow Eraser,” a legendary artifact created by the Topmage Aphnaidel that can erase anything it touches. (Note: Marks of Shadow; 그림자 자국" Book introduction by the publisher)

=== Prequel Stories ===
Three prequel short stories to Dragon Raja and Future Walker were collected as A Scene from a Laboratory in July 2018, then a full-cast unabridged audiobook adaptation was released in January 2021. These stories feature the archmage Handrake, his apprentice Solocher, and Princess Hulsruin:

- Golem (1998) — Solocher visits Handrake’s laboratory for advice after being asked on a date by a noblewoman. Handrake, eager not to be disturbed, commands a newly completed golem to block the laboratory door—forgetting that he and his apprentice would also be trapped inside. As they remain stuck, Princess Hulsruin arrives and leaves them with a cryptic message.
- Chimera (2001) — While cleaning the lab, Handrake and Solocher accidentally create a true chimera. The creature demands a perfect mate, but the pair struggle to determine the chimera’s gender. Princess Hulsruin later appears with a decisive solution.
- The Source of Happiness (2004) — Handrake magically duplicates Solocher so three magicians can simultaneously complete a complex experiment. The result of their efforts is an elixir called “the source of happiness.”

== Other media ==
=== Video games ===
- Dragon Raja Online

The world of Dragon Raja and some of the main characters were adapted into an MMORPG titled Dragon Raja Online. The game began development in 1998 with investment from Samsung Electronics, and officially launched in October 2000 in South Korea by eSofnet. It was subsequently released in Taiwan, China, and Hong Kong in 2001 under the localized title Dragon Raja (龍族/龙族), where the novel was published in the same title and marketed along with the game. In 2006 the game turned free to play and expanded its services to 10 countries including the U.S. Following the bankruptcy of eSofnet in 2006 the game rights were acquired by Sesisoft, and the game services were managed by Barunson Interactive and later Gravity Games. Official service for both Korea and global markets ended in 2011.

- Dragon Raja

The first mobile game adaptation was released in 2004 through KT Freetel's mobile game services. The game was a singleplayer RPG designed for feature phones, featuring about 15 hours of gameplay based on the early chapters of the novel.

- Dragon Raja M

In February 2016, Dragon Raja M, an action RPG developed by Vision Bros and published by Locojoy, was released, featuring characters and storylines from the original novel alongside grind-heavy progression systems. In June 2021, Aprogen Games (formerly Locojoy) released Dragon Raja Origin reusing artwork and selective questlines from 2016 Dragon Raja M. The game is currently serviced by ITOXI.
Dragon Raja 2: Future Walker

In May 2019, Dragon Raja 2: Future Walker by Skymoons Technology incorporated characters from both Dragon Raja and Future Walker. It was shut down in September 2020. In July 2021, Dragon Raja EX, an idle RPG featuring SD-style characters, was launched by EExpo Games and serviced by NesM.

=== Animated Works ===
On February 18, 2025, it was announced that Locus Animation, which produced Red Shoes and the Seven Dwarfs and Exorcism Chronicles: The Beginning, was planning to produce an animated adaptation of Dragon Raja.

=== Radio drama ===
Dragon Raja was adapted as a part of KBS Radio 2's Fantasy Express program, and a total of 83 episodes ran in 2001.

=== Audiobook ===
Dragon Raja was adapted as an audiobook. It was serialized for free on Naver Audio Clip for 4 weeks, 5 times a week, starting on December 20, 2021, and 1-2 parts were released per month, and the serialization was completed in December 2022.

=== Comic books ===
Dragon Raja was an inspiration for a series of comic books by Son Bong-gyu of the same title.
