= Dynamo Gaming =

Indian YouTuber (born 1995)

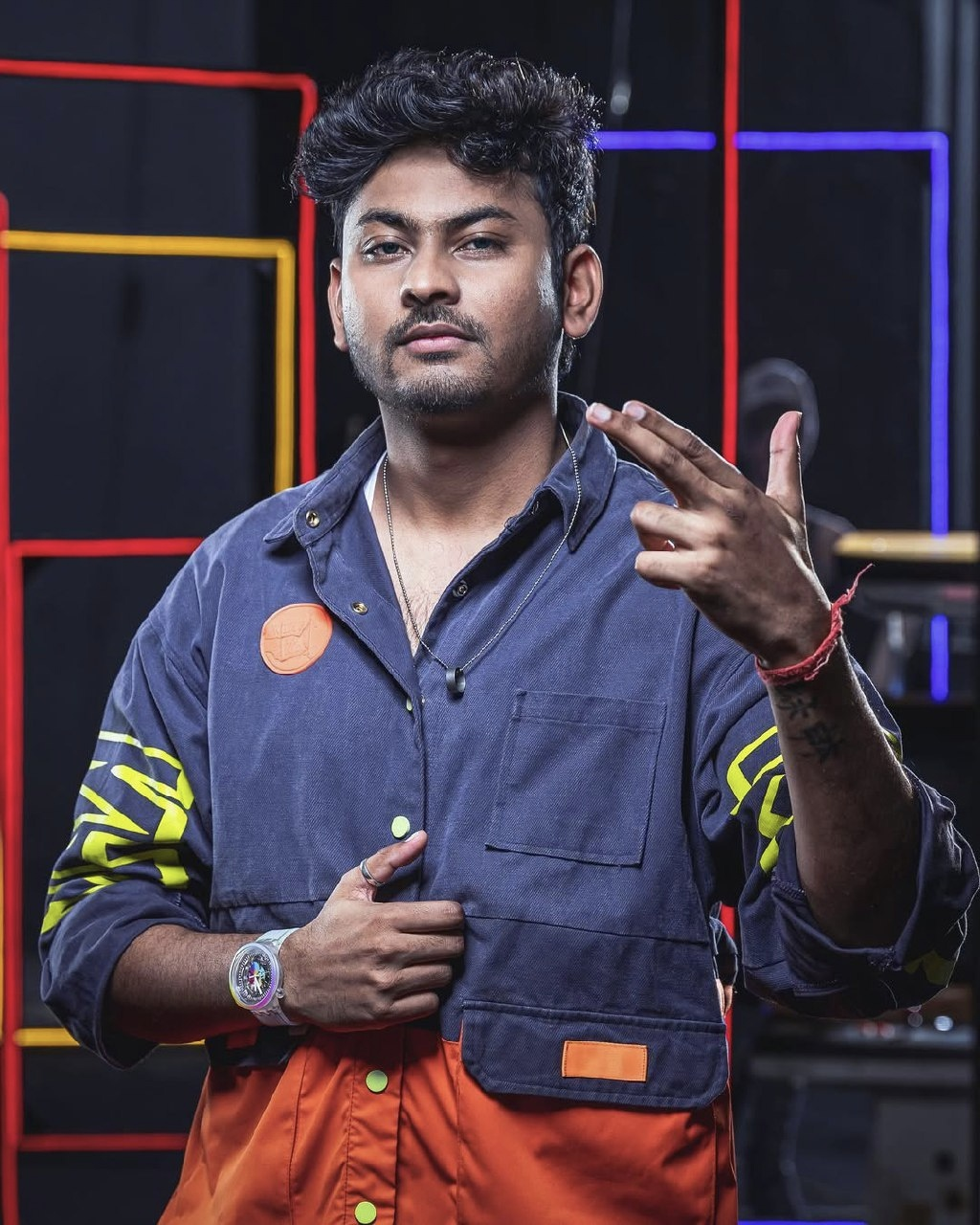
- Dynamo in 2024

Personal information
- Name: Aaditya Deepak Sawant
- Born: Aaditya Deepak Sawant; 3 June 1995 (age 31); Gondia, Maharashtra, India

Current team
- Team: Hydra Esports; Godlike Esports
- Role: Lead Content Creator, Founder – Hydra Esports; Co-owner – Godlike Esports
- Games: Battlegrounds Mobile India; Mobile Legends: Bang Bang

Career information
- Games: Battlegrounds Mobile India; Mobile Legends: Bang Bang; PUBG Mobile; GTA V; PUBG: Battlegrounds; Apex Legends; Battlefield; Dota 2
- Playing career: 2010–present

YouTube information
- Channel: Dynamo Gaming
- Years active: 21 July 2010–present
- Genre: Gaming
- Subscribers: 10.1 million
- Views: 1.38 billion
- Last updated: 19 March 2026

Aaditya Deepak Sawant, popularly known as Dynamo Gaming, is an Indian gaming content creator and live streamer. He is widely recognized for his catchphrase, 'Patt Se Headshot'. He started his YouTube channel in 2009, initially playing various games, but gained wider recognition with PUBG Mobile. Dynamo founded and leads Hydra Esports (gaming organization) since 2018. In June 2026, he also became the co-owner of GodLike esports organization. With expansion into vlogging, his channel has grown significantly, making him a well-known figure in the Indian gaming community.

== Career ==
Born on June 3, 1995, in Gondia, Maharashtra, he developed an interest in gaming at a young age, spending time in gaming parlors playing titles like Counter-Strike, GTA V and Dota. In 2010, he created his YouTube channel, Dynamo Gaming, inspired by the British illusionist Dynamo. In the early years, he focused on games like Battlefield, Dota 2, Apex Legends and PUBG: Battlegrounds. However, his channel saw slow growth, with only a few hundred subscribers after several years. Despite this, he remained committed, continuously uploading gameplay videos and learning about the gaming industry.

In November 2022, Dynamo launched a Spotify Original podcast titled Gamers Unplugged, focusing on the Indian gaming and esports industry. The podcast features discussions with gaming influencers, esports players, and content creators of India. Notable guests have included Naman "Mortal" Mathur, Indian rapper King, comedian and content creator Tanmay Bhat, and mentalist Suhani Shah.

Dynamo was honored as the special guest for the Bihar State Esports Championship 2024, hosted by the Bihar State Sports Authority.

== Hydra Esports ==
Hydra Esports is a gaming and esports organization founded by Sawant. Initially created as a PUBG Mobile clan, Hydra expanded into a broader community of gamers and content creators, gaining recognition for its gameplay and live streams.

== Awards and achievements ==
Year	Awards	Result	Ref.
2024	National Creators Award by GOI	Nominated	
