= Battlegrounds Mobile India Series =

Esports tournament

- Current season, competition or edition: Battlegrounds Mobile India Series 2026
- Game: Battlegrounds Mobile India
- Founded: 2021
- Founder: Krafton
- Organising body: Krafton; Tesseract Esports
- Region: India
- Most recent champion: (India) Team SouL (1st Title)
- Most titles: (India) SaumRaj (2) (India) Destro (2)
- Website: kraftonindiaesports.com

The Battlegrounds Mobile India Series (BGIS) is India's highest level professional league for Battlegrounds Mobile India. It is Krafton's premier open entry tournament for BGMI in India. The championship allows players of all skill levels to compete for national glory and a multi-crore prize pool. The tournament culminates in massive multi-day LAN Grand Finals.

BGIS features multi-stage online qualifiers, league phases and a LAN Grand Final, making it one of the largest mobile esports competitions in India. The tournament runs annually and works alongside the Battlegrounds Mobile India Pro Series (BMPS) as part of Krafton's official BGMI competitive circuit. After the temporary BGMI ban in 2022, BGIS returned with the game's reinstatement in 2023 and continues to serve as India's primary pathway into elite domestic and potential international competition.

== Overview ==
Battlegrounds Mobile India Series (BGIS) began in 2019, when Tencent Games and PUBG Corporation announced their first PUBG Mobile tournament in India, PUBG Mobile India Series 2019, with a prize pool of ₹1 crore. The event consists of numerous teams participating from India through In-Game Qualifiers, Competing through multiple rounds teams advance forward to grand finals, where they compete for Glory and big chunk of prize pool. The India Series laid a foundation for BGMI Esports in India, Giving opportunities to aspiring esports athletes to shine bright on the biggest BGMI esports stage of India, the series is considered as of highest grade and most competitive flagship event of BGMI India.

== History ==
=== PUBG Mobile India Series 2019 ===
Tencent Games announced the PUBG Mobile India Series (PMIS) 2019 one of its biggest tournaments for the country. Having a prize pool of Rs 1 Crore the tournament should see players battling it out to earn that delicious chicken dinner along with some cool cash prizes.

The Event had 4 Phases where teams from all over India battled in In Game Qualifiers, 2000 teams squads from online qualifiers proceeded into round 1. 2000 teams divided into 100 groups, each having 20 squads and playing 1 match per group, Top 4 squads from each group proceeds to Round 2. 400 Squads are again divided into group of 20 each, Playing 1 match per group and top 4 squads from each group advances to round 3.In round 3, 80 Squads were divided into 4 groups of 20 each, playing best of 3 matches with 4 squads from each group proceeding to Grand Finale.

The Grand Finals took place on 19 March 2019 in Hyderabad, where Team SouL led by Naman "Mortal" Mathur emerged as Champions, While Team God's Reign grabbed second spot, Team SouL's victory not only established them as one of the most dominant squads in Indian PUBG Mobile history but also marked a significant milestone in the development of the country's esports ecosystem.

The event also featured individual awards like MVP Award, Exterminators, Healers, Redeemer, Lone ranger and Rampage Freak with INR 50K prize money each.

=== PUBG Mobile India Series 2020 ===
PUBG Corp. along with Tencent games announced second edition of PUBG Mobile India Series in 2020 with a prize pool of INR 50 Lakhs. With COVID-19 lockdown still in place, The organisers are expecting a surge in registration for the tournament.

Due to COVID-19, there was no physical event arranged in 3030, instead event was held in online mode where enthusiasts could watch the game on PUBG Mobile India's official YouTube channel and Facebook page.

The format had seen the changes from PMIS 2019. In 2020, the PMIS had 5 stages namely In-game qualifiers, Online qualifiers, Quarter finals, Semi finals and Grand Finals. Every stage from online qualifiers had several number of qualified teams from preceding stage as well as few directly invited teams. Each stage was an elimination stage where certain number of teams got eliminated from the tournament and rest advances for the further stage.

The Grand Finals of PMIS 2020 had 16 top teams of India, The tournament ended after action-packed 3 day finals, TSM-entity team coming out on top with 177 points and took home a cash prize of INR 20Lakhs. In what came out to be a fierce competition Team Fnatic clinched the second spot while Team Mayhem ended on third position.

=== Battlegrounds Mobile India Series 2021 ===
Krafton India announced its first IP the Battlegrounds Mobile India Series following its return to Indian region after BAN in year 2020. The BGIS 2021 became the first open for all tournament for BGMI Players with the prize pool of INR 1Cr. which also includes exciting individual as well as team awards.

India Series serves as a platform to discover and nurture new esports talent across India every year. The tournament brings together emerging teams and experienced organizations, showcasing determination, teamwork, and the relentless pursuit of victory. As teams evolve, regroup, and compete through challenging stages, they are driven by both the fear of defeat and the desire to achieve greatness. BGIS stands as a celebration of partnership, perseverance, and competitive spirit, where glory awaits those who rise to the occasion.

However, the event was postponed due to increasing number of in-game hackers. The Krafton India introduced anti cheat engine in the game and permanently sanctioned nearly 1.52 million accounts, Maintaining the fairness in BGMI casual as well as competitive esports scene.

BGIS 2021 kicked off in December 2021 with In-game qualifiers, Where top 1024 teams made it to Online-qualifiers. Online qualifiers had 3 rounds where every round saw eliminations of few teams. Only 64 teams made it out of online qualifiers to quarter finals and 24 teams from quarters to semis. Semi finals had a round robin format, where bottom 8 teams were eliminated and rest 16 teams qualified for Grand Finals.

BGIS 2021 Grand Finals were held in online mode, The finals saw 4 days of fierce battle where Skylightz gaming crowned as Champions of the inaugural season, Followed by TSM who fell short by 3 points.

Team Skylightz gaming booked their ticket to PMGC 2021 whose Grand Finals was set to be held from Jan 21 - 23, Representing the India on the world stage playing against world's best team. However, Team Skylightz gaming, TSM and Team Xo was not able to participate in PUBG Mobile Global Championship 2021 due to documentation issue, hence the PMGC slot was passed onto Team GodLike. Team GodLike esports finished at 13th place in PMGC 2021.

=== Battlegrounds Mobile India Series 2023 ===
Krafton India announced BGIS second edition in 2023, Where top teams from India will battle for the glory and a prize pool of INR 2Cr. This year tournament had a new stage The Grind, Professional Players gateaway to BGIS 2023. With BGIS being India's premier esports tournament, providing a pathway for aspiring players to compete on the nation's biggest battleground. Through various high-pressure stages, the competition brought together rising talent and established teams in a test of skill, strategy, and teamwork. Every stage offered players the opportunity to gain experience, prove their capabilities, and establish themselves in the competitive esports ecosystem. More than just a tournament, BGIS 2023 was a celebration of passion, perseverance, and the relentless pursuit of excellence, where the next generation of esports stars rise to prominence.

The BGIS 2023 kicked off with "The Grind" where 256 invited teams battled it out to move into next rounds, The Grind was followed by 4 Rounds then Losers bracket, Semi Finals and Grand Finals. Each stage was a knockout stage, where some underdog and renowned teams faced elimination.

Team Gladiators Esports secured the Championship in the 3 Day grand finals held at Sardar Vallabhbhai Patel Indoor Stadium at Mumbai, India with more than 6000 esports fans across India gathering to witness the event. Krafton India had invited Olympic Gold Medalist Neeraj Chopra as the Chief Guest who also felicitated winners in the closing ceremony.

=== Battlegrounds Mobile India Series 2024 ===
BGIS 2024, Marked the third season of the series, With BGMI Esports attracting more players and viewers, Krafton India announced BGIS 2024 to start from 4 April 2024.With BGIS standing as a true celebration of talent, determination and the spirit of the competition, offering aspiring players showcase their skills alongside some of the best in the game, BGIS becomes India's premier esports platform. Along with opportunity to play at the biggest stage, the event also featured a massive prize pool of INR 2Cr.

The format for BGIS consisted of total 6 stages, Starting with The Grind followed by 4 Rounds of qualifiers, This year BGIS introduced Wild Card where teams who missed out on semi finals qualification from round 4 will get another chance to prove themself and secure the qualification. Semi-finals 1 & 2 were next inline and the event was set to be end with a 3 Day Action Packed Grand Finals at Hitex Exhibition center in Hyderabad, India.

Team XSparks was crowned as the Champions of the BGIS 2024 after a last match thriller in Grand Finals.Team not only lifted the trophy but also pocket INR 60Lakhs as the prizemoney.While team that stood second, Global Esports, took home Rs.30 lakh while Reckoning Esports received Rs.20 lakh for finishing third. For BGIS 2024, Krafton India invited Abhinav Bindra who is an Olympic games gold medalist as the chief guest for the event and also donated INR 25Lakh to his Abhinav Bindra Foundation.

=== Battlegrounds Mobile India Series 2025 ===
Krafton India Announced BGIS 2025, Bigger and better than ever, BGIS 2025 was a landmark moment for Indian esports, bringing together the country's best and most promising BGMI teams on one of the biggest competitive stages ever seen. With dreams on the line, fierce rivalries, and a packed arena atmosphere, the tournament showcased the passion and growth of the esports ecosystem. More than just a tournament, realme BGIS 2025 served as a proving ground for talent, resilience, and excellence, cementing its place as a defining chapter in India's esports history.

One of the defining highlights of realme BGIS 2025 was its record-breaking ₹3.2 crore prize pool, the largest in the history of Indian esports at the time. Originally announced with a ₹2 crore purse, KRAFTON India increased the prize pool by an additional ₹1.2 crore, a 60% boost extending rewards beyond the finalists to support the top 32 teams and strengthen the broader competitive ecosystem. The increase was made possible through the success of the newly introduced BGIS 2025 Crate, an in-game item that enabled fans to directly contribute to the growth of esports. According to KRAFTON, the initiative received an overwhelming response from the community, highlighting the growing engagement and passion of BGMI players across the country. By combining community-driven support with unprecedented prize money, BGIS 2025 not only raised the stakes for competitors but also set a new benchmark for esports tournaments in India, reinforcing the rapid growth and sustainability of the nation's esports ecosystem.

Battlegrounds Mobile India Series 2025 concluded after a 3-day Electrifying Grand Finale hosted at Biswa Bangla Mela Prangan in Kolkata. Team Versatile (VXT) delivered a remarkable performance to secure the coveted trophy with 169 points across 18 matches, while GodLike Esports and Orangutan finished as runners-up and third-place finishers respectively. The event showcased the growing maturity of India's esports ecosystem, attracting massive fan engagement both online and offline. With record viewership, unprecedented community participation.

=== Battlegrounds Mobile India Series 2026 ===
Following the record-breaking success of BGIS 2025, KRAFTON India has unveiled an even bigger roadmap for BGIS 2026, reaffirming its commitment to the growth of competitive BGMI esports in the country. The tournament will once again feature a substantial ₹2 crore prize pool and a multi-stage format designed to provide opportunities for both emerging talent and established teams.Beginning with open registrations and in-game qualifiers, the competition will progress through several elimination rounds before culminating in a high-stakes Grand Finals event.

BGIS 2026 has set a new benchmark for Indian esports with a record-breaking ₹4 crore prize pool for its Grand Finals in Chennai. Originally announced with a ₹2 crore purse, the prize pool was doubled through Discovery Island, an innovative in-game initiative that allowed BGMI players to directly contribute to the tournament. The overwhelming community participation unlocked an additional ₹2 crore, highlighting the passion and engagement of India's gaming community. With the top teams competing for a ₹1 crore championship prize and a share of the historic purse, BGIS 2026 further cements its position as India's premier esports tournament and a symbol of the industry's rapid growth.

BGIS 2026 concluded with iQOO SOUL emerging as champions after a dominant performance at the Grand Finals in Chennai. The team secured the title and the ₹1 crore winner's prize from the record-breaking ₹4 crore prize pool, edging out Genesis Esports in one of the closest finishes in BGIS history. The event also set a new benchmark for Indian mobile esports, attracting over 600,000 peak concurrent viewers and becoming the most-watched BGMI tournament to date. Driven by strong community participation, a packed live audience, and record-breaking viewership, BGIS 2026 showcased the rapid growth of India's esports ecosystem and further solidified its status as the country's premier esports championship.

== Results ==
Sr	Year	Venue	Host	Prizepool	Result			MVP
Sr	Year	Venue	Host	Prizepool	Champion	Runner-up	2nd Runner Up	MVP
1	2019	G. M. C. Balayogi Indoor Stadium	Hyderabad, India	₹52,00,000	Team SouL	Gods Reign	FUNKY MONKEY	ItsKK (Gods Reign)
2	2020	Online	India	₹50,00,000	TSM Entity	Fnatic	Team Mayhem	Owais (Fnatic)
3	2021	Online	India	₹1,00,00,000	Skylightz Gaming	TSM	Team XO	Neyoo (GodLike Esports)
4	2023	Sardar Vallabhbhai Patel Indoor Stadium	Mumbai, India	₹2,00,00,000	Gladiator Esports	Big Brother Esports	Team XSpark	DeltaPG (Gladiators Esports)
5	2024	Hitex Exhibition center	Hyderabad, India	₹2,00,00,000	Team XSpark	Global Esports	Reckoning Esports	NinjaBoi (Global Esports)
6	2025	Biswa Bangla Mela Prangan	Kolkata, India	₹3,21,00,000	Team Versatile	GodLike Esports	Orangutan	Admino (GodLike Esports) (MVP); Jonathan (GodLike Esports) (FMVP)
7	2026	Chennai Trade Centre	Chennai, India	₹4,00,00,000	Team SouL	Genesis Esports	Orangutan	HunterZ (Genesis Esports) (MVP); Legit (Team SouL) (FMVP)

== Statistics ==
Teams with Most Podium Finishes

Sr	Team	Champion	Runner-up	2nd Runner Up	Total
1	Team SouL	2 (2019,2026)			2
2	Gods Reign	1 (2023) (Gladiator Esports)	1 (2019)		2
3	TSM	1 (2020) (TSM Entity)	1 (2021)		1
4	Revenant XSpark	1 (2024) (Team XSpark)		1 (2023) (Team XSpark)	2
5	Orangutan			2 (2025,2026)	2
6	Skylightz Gaming	1 (2021)			1
7	Team Versatile	1 (2025)			1
8	Fnatic		1 (2020)		1
9	Big Brother Esports		1 (2023)		1
10	Global Esports		1 (2024)		1
11	GodLike Esports		1 (2025)		1
12	Genesis Esports		1 (2026)		1
13	Funky Monkey			1 (2019)	1
14	Team Mayhem			1 (2020)	1
15	Team XO			1 (2021)	1
16	Reckoning Esports			1 (2021)	1
