= PUBG Mobile Global Championship 2024 =

PUBG Mobile tournament

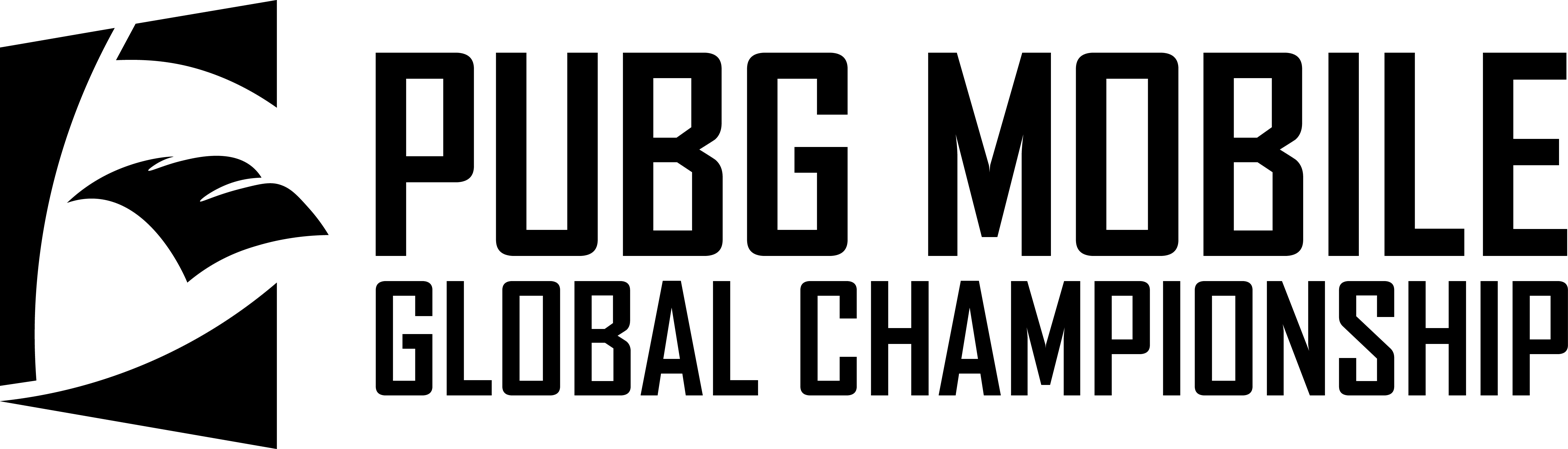

Tournament information
- Game: PUBG Mobile
- Dates: 31 October 2024–8 December 2024
- Administrator: Level Infinite, Krafton
- Tournament format: Battle Royale
- Host(s): United Kingdom & Malaysia
- Venue(s): (Malaysia) Kuala Lumpur (League Stage) (United Kingdom) ExCeL London, London (Grand Finals)
- Participants: 49 teams
- Purse: $3,000,000
- Website: https://esports.pubgmobile.com

Final positions
- Champion: (South Korea) Dplus KIA
- 1st runner-up: (Turkey) Regnum Carya Bra Esports
- 2nd runner-up: (European Union) Nigma Galaxy
- MVP: (South Korea) Song "Nolbu" Soo-an (DK)

The PUBG Mobile Global Championship 2024 was the final event of the 2024 PUBG Mobile competitive season. In the PMGC 2024, 48 qualified teams participated in the League Stage across the phases of Group Stage, Survival Stage & Last Chance in Kuala Lumpur, Malaysia as a closed offline event from October 31st to November 24th. The Grand Finals was held in London, United Kingdom on December 6–8 and 15 qualified teams from the League Stage were joined with the host country team. The championship featured a total prizepool of $3,000,000 USD.

== Venue ==
The league stage was held in Kuala Lumpur. Malaysia. On the other hand, the grand finals was held at the ExCeL London in United Kingdom.

League Stage	Grand Finals
(Malaysia) Kuala Lumpur	(United Kingdom) London
Kuala Lumpur, in Malaysia (Malaysia)	ExCeL London

== Qualification ==
=== Grand Finals Invited ===
Region	Invitation Name	Team name
EMEA	Host Country Invitation	(United Kingdom) Guild Esports

=== League Stage ===
Region	Event	Qualification method	Team name
Southeast Asia	PMGC Points	2024 PMGC Points - Indonesia #1	(Indonesia) Alter Ego Ares
Southeast Asia	PMGC Points	2024 PMGC Points - Malaysia #1	(Malaysia) CelcomDigi Alliance
Southeast Asia	PMGC Points	2024 PMGC Points - Thailand #1	(Thailand) Vampire Esports
Southeast Asia	PMGC Points	2024 PMGC Points - Vietnam #1	(Vietnam) D'Xavier
Southeast Asia	PMSL SEA	PMSL SEA Fall 2024 ~~Champion~~ 3rd place	(Vietnam) GETSO ROY Esports
Southeast Asia	PMSL SEA	PMSL SEA Fall 2024 ~~Runner-up~~ 5th place	(Vietnam) Team Secret
Southeast Asia	PMSL SEA	PMSL SEA Fall 2024 ~~3rd place~~ 6th place	(Thailand) FaZe Clan
Southeast Asia	PMSL SEA	PMSL SEA Fall 2024 ~~4th place~~ 7th place	(Indonesia) RRQ Ryu
Southeast Asia	PMSL SEA	PMSL SEA Fall 2024 ~~5th place~~ 8th place	(Indonesia) Bigetron Knights
Southeast Asia	PMSL SEA	PMSL SEA Fall 2024 ~~6th place~~ 9th place	(Indonesia) VOIN Donkey ID
Southeast Asia	PMCL SEA	PMCL SEA Fall 2024 Champion	(Philippines) Harame Bro
South Asia & Central Asia	PMGC 2023	PUBG Mobile Global Championship 2023 Champion	(Mongolia) IHC Esports
South Asia & Central Asia	PMGC Points	2024 PMGC Points - South Asia #1	(Nepal) DRS Gaming
South Asia & Central Asia	PMGC Points	2024 PMGC Points - Pakistan #1	(Pakistan) AS i8 Esports
South Asia & Central Asia	PMGC Points	2024 PMGC Points - Central Asia #1	(Mongolia) 4Merical Vibes
South Asia & Central Asia	PMGC Points	2024 PMGC Points - CSA ~~#1~~ #2	(Mongolia) Falcons Force
South Asia & Central Asia	PMSL CSA	PMSL CSA Fall 2024 ~~Champion~~ 3rd place	(Mongolia) Stalwart Esports
South Asia & Central Asia	PMSL CSA	PMSL CSA Fall 2024 ~~Runner-up~~ 5th place	(Commonwealth of Independent States) Major Pride
South Asia & Central Asia	PMSL CSA	PMSL CSA Fall 2024 ~~3rd place~~ 6th place	(Nepal) Horaa Esports
South Asia & Central Asia	PMSL CSA	PMSL CSA Fall 2024 ~~4th place~~ 7th place	(Commonwealth of Independent States) De Muerte
South Asia & Central Asia	PMSL CSA	PMSL CSA Fall 2024 ~~5th place~~ 9th place	(Kazakhstan) Insilio
Europe, Middle East & Africa	PMGC Points	2024 PMGC Points - Türkiye #1	(Turkey) IW NRX
Europe, Middle East & Africa	PMGC Points	2024 PMGC Points - MEA #1	(Russia) Brute Force
Europe, Middle East & Africa	PMGC Points	2024 PMGC Points - Europe #1	(Russia) Team Spirit
Europe, Middle East & Africa	PMGC Points	2024 PMGC Points - EMEA ~~#1~~ #4	(Serbia) Virtus.pro
Europe, Middle East & Africa	PMSL EMEA	PMSL EMEA Fall 2024 ~~Champion~~ Runner-up	(Iraq) Twisted Minds
Europe, Middle East & Africa	PMSL EMEA	PMSL EMEA Fall 2024 ~~Runner-up~~ 3rd place	(European Union) Nigma Galaxy
Europe, Middle East & Africa	PMSL EMEA	PMSL EMEA Fall 2024 ~~3rd place~~ 4th place	(Turkey) Zeus Esports
Europe, Middle East & Africa	PMSL EMEA	PMSL EMEA Fall 2024 ~~4th place~~ 6th place	(Turkey) Regnum Carya Bra Esports
Europe, Middle East & Africa	PMSL EMEA	PMSL EMEA Fall 2024 ~~5th place~~ 7th place	(Russia) 77
Europe, Middle East & Africa	PMSL EMEA	PMSL EMEA Fall 2024 ~~6th place~~ 8th place	(Ukraine) Natus Vincere
Americas	PMGC Points	2024 PMGC Points - Brazil #1	(Brazil) Alpha7 Esports
Americas	PMGC Points	2024 PMGC Points - Latin America #1	(Chile) Team Queso
Americas	PMGC Points	2024 PMGC Points - North America #1	(Brazil) iNCO Gaming
Americas	PMSL Americas	PMSL Americas Fall 2024 ~~Champion~~ 3rd place	(Brazil) Influence Rage
Americas	PMSL Americas	PMSL Americas Fall 2024 ~~Runner-up~~ 4th place	(Brazil) Team Liquid
Americas	PMSL Americas	PMSL Americas Fall 2024 ~~3rd place~~ 6th place	(Brazil) Loops Esports
Americas	PMSL Americas	PMSL Americas Fall 2024 ~~4th place~~ 7th place	(Brazil) FURIA
Americas	PMSL Americas	PMSL Americas Fall 2024 ~~5th place~~ 8th place	(Mexico) The Vicious
China	Peacekeeper Elite League	2024 PEL Fall Champion	(China) TJB Esports
China	Peacekeeper Elite League; Championship Points	2024 PEL Points ~~#1~~ #2	(China) ThunderTalk Gaming
China	Peacekeeper Elite League; Championship Points	2024 PEL Points ~~#2~~ #3	(China) Tianba
China	PEL Qualifier	PMGC 2024 - PEL Qualifier Champion	(China) Regans Gaming
South Korea & Japan	Pro Series Korea	PMPS 2024 Season 3 Champion	(South Korea) DRX
South Korea & Japan	Pro Series Korea	2024 PMPS Points ~~#1~~ #2	(South Korea) Dplus KIA
South Korea & Japan	Japan League	PMJL S4 Phase 2 Champion	(Japan) CAG OSAKA
South Korea & Japan	Japan League	PMJL S4 Phase 2 ~~Runner-up~~ 2nd Runner-up	(Japan) VENGEANCE
South Korea & Japan	Rivals Cup	Rivals Cup 2024 Season 2 Champion	(South Korea) Miraen Sejong

== Format ==
The tournament is divided into 2 stages: League and Grand Finals. The League stage is further divided into three stages where it will begin with a Group Stage featuring 48 teams divided into 3 groups of 16. Each group will compete over a specific week consisting of 24 matches, spread across 4 matchdays, with 6 matches each day. The top 3 teams from each group will advance directly to the Grand Finals, while teams placing 4th to 11th will move on to the Survival Stage, and the bottom 5 teams will be eliminated. In the Survival Stage, the 24 remaining teams will be split into 3 groups of 8, playing 18 matches over 3 days in a Round-Robin format. The top 16 teams will progress to the Last Chance stage, with the bottom 8 teams being eliminated. The Last Chance stage will feature 16 teams competing in 12 matches, where the top 6 teams will secure their spots in the Grand Finals, and the bottom 11 teams will be eliminated. The Grand Finals will consist of 16 teams, including the 15 qualified from the League Stage and 1 host country invited team, competing in 18 matches to determine the champion.

== Schedule ==
Round	Date	Teams
Group Stage	31 October 2024	Group Yellow
Group Stage	1 November 2024	Group Yellow
Group Stage	2 November 2024	Group Yellow
Group Stage	3 November 2024	Group Yellow
Group Stage	7 November 2024	Group Red
Group Stage	8 November 2024	Group Red
Group Stage	9 November 2024	Group Red
Group Stage	10 November 2024	Group Red
Group Stage	14 November 2024	Group Green
Group Stage	15 November 2024	Group Green
Group Stage	16 November 2024	Group Green
Group Stage	17 November 2024	Group Green
Survival Stage	20 November 2024	Green vs Yellow
Survival Stage	21 November 2024	Red vs Green
Survival Stage	22 November 2024	Yellow vs Red
Last Chance	23 November 2024	Top 16 teams from Survival Stage
Last Chance	24 November 2024	Top 16 teams from Survival Stage
Grand Finals	6 December 2024	1 invited team Top 3 teams from each group of Group Stage; Top 6 teams from Last Chance
Grand Finals	7 December 2024	1 invited team Top 3 teams from each group of Group Stage; Top 6 teams from Last Chance
Grand Finals	8 December 2024	1 invited team Top 3 teams from each group of Group Stage; Top 6 teams from Last Chance

== Group Stage ==
=== Group Draw ===
Group Yellow		Group Red		Group Green	
Bigetron Knights	D'Xavier	Alter Ego Ares	GETSO ROY Esports	RRQ Ryu	VOIN Donkey ID
Vampire Esports	Harame Bro	FaZe Clan	Natus Vincere	Team Secret	CelcomDigi Alliance
Twisted Minds	Zeus Esports	Nigma Galaxy	IW NRX	Brute Force	Regnum Carya Bra Esports
Team Spirit	Major Pride	Virtus.pro	Insilio	77	Stalwart Esports
De Muerte	Horaa Esports	Falcons Force	AS i8 Esports	4Merical Vibes	DRS Gaming
Loops Esports	Alpha7 Esports	FURIA	Team Queso	Team Liquid	Influence Rage
iNCO Gaming	Regans Gaming	TJB Esports	Tianba	The Vicious	ThunderTalk Gaming
DRX	Miraen Sejong	VENGEANCE	IHC Esports	Dplus KIA	CAG OSAKA

=== Group Red standings ===
Rank	Team	WWCD	Placement	Elims	Total points	Qualification
1	Natus Vincere	4	72	114	186	Qualified for the Grand Finals
2	TJB Esports	5	65	112	177	Qualified for the Grand Finals
3	Nigma Galaxy	2	71	101	172	Qualified for the Grand Finals
4	IW NRX	1	56	115	171	Advanced to the Survival Stage
5	Falcons Force	2	68	100	168	Advanced to the Survival Stage
6	AS i8 Esports	2	47	117	164	Advanced to the Survival Stage
7	FaZe Clan	3	57	102	159	Advanced to the Survival Stage
8	Tianba	2	46	84	130	Advanced to the Survival Stage
9	Insilio	1	49	75	124	Advanced to the Survival Stage
10	GETSO ROY Esports	0	38	78	116	Advanced to the Survival Stage
11	Team Queso	0	32	80	112	Advanced to the Survival Stage
12	IHC Esports	1	37	69	106	Eliminated
13	VENGEANCE	1	39	62	101	Eliminated
14	Alter Ego Ares	0	23	78	101	Eliminated
15	FURIA	1	41	55	96	Eliminated
16	Virtus.pro	0	27	67	94	Eliminated

=== Group Yellow standings ===
Rank	Team	WWCD	Placement	Elims	Total points	Qualification
1	Team Spirit	3	78	147	225	Qualified for the Grand Finals
2	DRX	4	76	114	190	Qualified for the Grand Finals
3	Alpha7 Esports	3	76	114	190	Qualified for the Grand Finals
4	Major Pride	2	58	126	184	Advanced to the Survival Stage
5	Miraen Sejong	2	62	105	167	Advanced to the Survival Stage
6	D'Xavier	1	68	97	165	Advanced to the Survival Stage
7	Vampire Esports	4	67	95	162	Advanced to the Survival Stage
8	Zeus Esports	1	51	83	134	Advanced to the Survival Stage
9	iNCO Gaming	0	38	79	117	Advanced to the Survival Stage
10	Bigetron Knights	1	40	76	116	Advanced to the Survival Stage
11	Loops Esports	1	35	79	114	Advanced to the Survival Stage
12	Horaa Esports	1	36	58	94	Eliminated
13	Twisted Minds	1	27	63	90	Eliminated
14	Harame Bro	0	22	64	86	Eliminated
15	Regans Gaming	0	17	61	78	Eliminated
16	De Muerte	0	17	50	67	Eliminated

=== Group Green standings ===
Rank	Team	WWCD	Placement	Elims	Total points	Qualification
1	Brute Force	3	77	110	187	Unable to qualify for Grand Finals due to VISA issues
2	Influence Rage	4	77	104	181	Qualified for the Grand Finals
3	ThunderTalk Gaming	2	66	112	178	Qualified for the Grand Finals
4	Dplus KIA	3	52	123	175	Advanced to the Survival Stage
5	4Merical Vibes	2	50	113	163	Advanced to the Survival Stage
6	Regnum Carya Bra Esports	2	64	95	159	Advanced to the Survival Stage
7	VOIN Donkey ID	3	68	90	158	Advanced to the Survival Stage
8	Team Liquid	2	41	91	132	Advanced to the Survival Stage
9	77	0	37	84	121	Advanced to the Survival Stage
10	Stalwart Esports	0	25	94	119	Advanced to the Survival Stage
11	The Vicious	0	50	62	112	Advanced to the Survival Stage
12	RRQ Ryu	2	39	78	117	Eliminated
13	DRS Gaming	0	30	76	106	Eliminated
14	CelcomDigi Alliance	0	26	76	102	Eliminated
15	CAG OSAKA	1	31	64	95	Eliminated
16	Team Secret	0	25	68	93	Eliminated

== Survival Stage & Last Chance ==
=== Survival Stage Group Draw ===
Group Yellow	Group Red	Group Green
Major Pride	IW NRX	Dplus KIA
Miraen Sejong	Falcons Force	4Merical Vibes
D'Xavier	AS i8 Esports	Regnum Carya Bra Esports
Vampire Esports	FaZe Clan	VOIN Donkey ID
Zeus Esports	Tianba	Team Liquid
iNCO Gaming	Insilio	77
Bigetron Knights	GETSO ROY Esports	Stalwart Esports
Loops Esports	Team Queso	The Vicious

=== Survival Stage standings ===
Rank	Team	WWCD	Placement	Elims	Total points	Qualification
1	D'Xavier	1	43	70	113	Qualified for Last Chance
2	Dplus KIA	2	35	66	101	Qualified for Last Chance
3	Insilio	0	40	60	100	Qualified for Last Chance
4	Regnum Carya Bra Esports	2	31	65	96	Qualified for Last Chance
5	77	1	33	60	93	Qualified for Last Chance
6	VOIN Donkey ID	2	50	37	87	Qualified for Last Chance
7	Stalwart Esports	1	22	62	84	Qualified for Last Chance
8	Major Pride	2	30	50	80	Qualified for Last Chance
9	IW NRX	1	27	53	80	Qualified for Last Chance
10	The Vicious	1	30	42	72	Qualified for Last Chance
11	Falcons Force	1	24	48	72	Qualified for Last Chance
12	Team Liquid	0	24	47	71	Qualified for Last Chance
13	4Merical Vibes	0	22	46	68	Qualified for Last Chance
14	Miraen Sejong	2	30	35	65	Qualified for Last Chance
15	Bigetron Knights	1	21	40	61	Qualified for Last Chance
16	Loops Esports	0	25	30	55	Qualified for Last Chance
17	FaZe Clan	0	14	41	55	Eliminated
18	Tianba	1	18	34	52	Eliminated
19	Team Queso	0	13	34	47	Eliminated
20	iNCO Gaming	0	10	32	42	Eliminated
21	Vampire Esports	0	9	26	35	Eliminated
22	AS i8 Esports	0	7	23	30	Eliminated
23	GETSO ROY Esports	0	12	17	29	Eliminated
24	Zeus Esports	0	6	23	29	Eliminated

=== Last Chance standings ===
Rank	Team	WWCD	Placement	Elims	Total points	Qualification
1	Falcons Force	2	43	98	141	Qualified for Grand Finals
2	Insilio	0	34	63	97	Qualified for Grand Finals
3	VOIN Donkey ID	1	39	58	97	Qualified for Grand Finals
4	The Vicious	1	36	53	89	Qualified for Grand Finals
5	Dplus KIA	1	30	52	82	Qualified for Grand Finals
6	Regnum Carya Bra Esports	3	34	44	78	Qualified for Grand Finals
7	4Merical Vibes	1	27	42	69	Received qualification due to Brute Force unable to obtain VISA
8	77	1	14	49	63	Eliminated
9	Loops Esports	0	22	38	60	Eliminated
10	Bigetron Knights	1	21	36	57	Eliminated
11	Stalwart Esports	1	22	30	52	Eliminated
12	D'Xavier	0	22	29	51	Eliminated
13	IW NRX	0	18	32	50	Eliminated
14	Miraen Sejong	0	15	33	48	Eliminated
15	Major Pride	0	9	24	33	Eliminated
16	Team Liquid	0	11	18	29	Eliminated

== Grand Finals ==
=== Grand Finals standings ===
Rank	Team	WWCD	Placements	Elims	Total points
1	Dplus KIA	3	59	94	153
2	Regnum Carya Bra Esports	3	50	102	152
3	Nigma Galaxy	2	58	79	137
4	Influence Rage	2	56	61	117
5	VOIN Donkey ID	0	42	70	112
6	DRX	2	47	62	109
7	4Merical Vibes	1	33	71	104
8	Team Spirit	2	45	56	101
9	Insilio	0	58	42	100
10	TJB Esports	1	17	81	98
11	Alpha7 Esports	1	35	60	95
12	The Vicious	1	36	57	93
13	ThunderTalk Gaming	0	20	61	81
14	Falcons Force	1	30	41	71
15	Natus Vincere	0	20	49	69
16	Guild Esports	0	15	29	44

== Final standings ==
the 2024 PUBG Mobile Global Championship's $3,000,000 USD prize pool is divided into separate categories. Each team will earn prizemoney based on how well they did in the Group Stage, Survival Stage, Last Chance and Grand Finals.

Final standings and prizepool of $3,000,000 USD distribution are as seen as below:

Final Placement	Team name	Total Prize Pool
Champion	(South Korea) Dplus KIA	$457,250
Runner-up	(Turkey) Regnum Carya Bra Esports	$255,250
3rd	(European Union) Nigma Galaxy	$183,000
4th	(Brazil) Influence Rage	$144,000
5th	(Indonesia) VOIN Donkey ID	$117,750
6th	(South Korea) DRX	$115,000
7th	(Mongolia) 4Merical Vibes	$95,000
8th	(Russia) Team Spirit	$100,000
9th	(Kazakhstan) Insilio	$89,000
10th	(China) TJB Esports	$94,000
11th	(Brazil) Alpha7 Esports	$90,500
12th	(Mexico) The Vicious	$77,250
13th	(China) ThunderTalk Gaming	$85,500
14th	(Mongolia) Falcons Force	$78,000
15th	(Ukraine) Natus Vincere	$82,500
16th	(United Kingdom) Guild Esports	$30,000
DNF	(Russia) Brute Force	$50,000
18th	(Russia) 77	$37,000
19th	(Brazil) Loops Esports	$33,250
20th	(Indonesia) Bigetron Knight	$33,500
21st	(Mongolia) Stalwart Esports	$35,000
22nd	(Vietnam) D'Xavier	$38,000
23rd	(Turkey) IW NRX	$36,500
24th	(South Korea) Miraen Sejong	$34,250
25th	(Commonwealth of Independent States) Major Pride	$35,750
26th	(Brazil) Team Liquid	$32,250
27th	(Thailand) FaZe Clan	$30,500
28th	(China) Tianba	$29,500
29th	(Chile) Team Queso	$27,500
30th	(Brazil) iNCO Gaming	$28,000
31st	(Thailand) Vampire Esports	$28,500
32nd	(Pakistan) AS i8 Esports	$28,500
33rd	(Vietnam) GETSO ROY Esports	$26,500
34th	(Turkey) Zeus Esports	$26,500
35th - 37th	(Nepal) Horaa Esports	$22,000
35th - 37th	(Mongolia) IHC Esports	$22,000
35th - 37th	(Indonesia) RRQ Ryu	$22,000
38th - 40th	(Iraq) Twisted Minds	$21,500
38th - 40th	(Japan) VENGEANCE	$21,500
38th - 40th	(Nepal) DRS Gaming	$21,500
41st - 43rd	(Philippines) Harame Bro	$21,000
41st - 43rd	(Indonesia) Alter Ego Ares	$21,000
41st - 43rd	(Malaysia) CelcomDigi Alliance	$21,000
44th - 46th	(China) Regans Gaming	$20,500
44th - 46th	(Brazil) FURIA	$20,500
44th - 46th	(Japan) CAG OSAKA	$20,500
47th - 49th	(Commonwealth of Independent States) De Muerte	$20,000
47th - 49th	(Serbia) Virtus.pro	$20,000
47th - 49th	(Vietnam) Team Secret	$20,000

=== Base Prize Distribution ===
==== League Stage ====
The League Stage has a total prize pool of $1,580,000 USD, and is distributed as follows:

Participation Reward
$10,000 (for each team)

Group Stage (per group)
Place	Prize (in USD)	Place	Prize (in USD)
1st	$40,000	9th	$13,500
2nd	$39,000	10th	$13,000
3rd	$38,000	11th	$12,500
4th	$16,000	12th	$12,000
5th	$15,500	13th	$11,500
6th	$15,000	14th	$11,000
7th	$14,500	15th	$10,500
8th	$14,000	16th	$10,000

Survival Stage
Place	Prize (in USD)	Place	Prize (in USD)	Place	Prize (in USD)
1st	$10,000	9th	$8,000	17th	$6,000
2nd	$9,750	10th	$7,750	18th	$5,500
3rd	$9,500	11th	$7,500	19th	$5,000
4th	$9,250	12th	$7,250	20th	$4,500
5th	$9,000	13th	$7,000	21st	$4,000
6th	$8,750	14th	$6,750	22nd	$3,500
7th	$8,500	15th	$6,500	23rd	$3,000
8th	$8,250	16th	$6,250	24th	$2,500

Last Chance
Place	Prize (in USD)	Place	Prize (in USD)
1st	$10,000	9th	$4,500
2nd	$8,500	10th	$4,000
3rd	$7,500	11th	$3,500
4th	$7,000	12th	$3,000
5th	$6,500	13th	$2,500
6th	$6,000	14th	$2,000
7th	$5,500	15th	$1,500
8th	$5,000	16th	$1,000

==== Grand Finals ====
The Grand Finals has a total prize pool of $1,420,000 USD, and is distributed as follows:

Participation Reward
$15,000 (for each team)

Grand Finals
Place	Prize (in USD)	Place	Prize (in USD)
1st	$400,000	9th	$32,500
2nd	$200,000	10th	$30,000
3rd	$120,000	11th	$27,500
4th	$80,000	12th	$25,000
5th	$62,000	13th	$22,500
6th	$51,000	14th	$20,000
7th	$42,000	15th	$17,500
8th	$35,000	16th	$15,000

=== Awards ===
Award name	Participant
Finals MVP	(South Korea) Nolbu (DK)
