= S8UL Esports =

Indian esports organization

- Short name: S8UL
- Founded: 2018
- Based in: Mumbai, India
- Owner: Animesh Agarwal (Thug); Lokesh Jain (Goldy); Naman Mathur (MortaL); Sumit Sovarasia
- Divisions: Apex Legends; BGMI; Chess; EA Sports FC; Fatal Fury; Fortnite; Free Fire; Honor of Kings; Mobile Legends; Pokémon Go; Pokémon Unite; PUBG: Battlegrounds; Street Fighter 6 Tekken; TrackMania
- Partners: AMD iQOO
- Website: s8ul.live

S8UL Esports is an Indian esports and content creation organization based in Mumbai, Maharashtra. The team has competed in titles such as Battlegrounds Mobile India (BGMI), Apex Legends, and Free Fire, etc and employs several YouTube content creators. The organization was formed as a result of a collaboration between Team Soul (owned by Naman "Mortal" Mathur) and Team 8bit (founded by Animesh "Thug" Agarwal and Lokesh "Goldy" Jain).

S8UL competes in 15 different esports titles across mobile, PC, and console gaming. They currently hold 14 championship titles and are four-time winners of the Best Content Group award at the Esports Awards.

== History ==
S8UL is an Indian esports and gaming content organization formed in 2020 through the merger of Team SouL and 8Bit Creatives. Founded by Naman Mathur, Animesh Agarwal, and Lokesh Jain, the organization is headquartered in Mumbai. S8UL quickly rose to prominence in Indian esports by combining competitive gaming with large-scale content creation, streaming, and creator management.

Initially gaining recognition through PUBG Mobile and BGMI, S8UL expanded into multiple esports titles including VALORANT, Pokémon Unite, Call of Duty, Apex Legends, Chess, Tekken, and EA FC. The organization also established the S8UL Gaming House in Mumbai, which became one of India's most recognized gaming creator facilities. Alongside tournament success, S8UL developed one of the country's largest gaming content ecosystems through YouTube and livestreaming platforms.

S8UL received international recognition after winning the “Esports Content Group of the Year” award at the Esports Awards for four consecutive years, becoming the first organization to achieve the feat repeatedly. The organization is widely regarded as one of India's leading esports brands and has played a major role in expanding the visibility of Indian gaming and esports on the global stage.

== Infrastructure ==
S8UL operates out of a gaming facility in Mumbai (referred to as the S8UL Gaming House 2.0) housing around 25 Indian gaming creators.

The facility is built across 15,000 square feet and is valued at $1 million, featuring four floors with streaming cabins, living rooms, recreational areas, a kitchen, and content creation spaces available to residing athletes and content creators.

== Current divisions ==
=== Apex Legends ===
S8UL has announced its participation in the Apex Legends Esports for Esports World Cup 2025 on their X account on April 10, 2025. S8UL signed a roster comprising talented and all Australian players that are well known in the competitive scene and will represent the club and India in the upcoming Apex Legends Global Tournaments.

S8UL continues to participate with the same roster at Esports World Cup 2026 by riding high on momentum with a Top 5 finish at ALGS 2026 Championship and consistent performance at ALGS year 6 Split 1 from APAC South Region.

==== Current roster ====
S8UL Esports Apex Legends roster
Players
Coaches

| Handle | Name | Nationality |
|---|---|---|
| Sharky | Wirth, Rick | Australia |
| jesko | Spaseki, Benjamin | Australia |
| Legacy | Canty, Tom | Australia |

Head coach

Harrison ‘Rogers’ Rogers

Legend:
- (I) Inactive
- (S) Suspended
- Substitute
- (injured) Injury / Illness

Latest roster transaction: April 10, 2025.

=== BGMI / PUBG Mobile ===
Team SouL is known for its long standing history, legacy and longevity in the Indian Esports ecosystem. The team has been in the system for eight years, played an influential role in Esports. In 2020, Team SouL became the part of S8UL esports after the merger of two organisations SouL & 8Bit.

Team SouL was created in 2018, by Indian gaming personality Naman "Mortal" Mathur, along with his teammates Ronak, Owais, Viper & Slayer.In the year 2019, Team SouL has won two major official events held by PUBG Corporation, The events are namely PUBG Mobile India Series 2019 and PUBG Mobile Club Open - 2019 Spring Split : India.

Over the years Team SouL has undergone multiple roster changes and downfall in the official and major events, In 2022, Omega, AkshaT, Goblin & Hector Joined with team along with coach Amit, The roster competed in Battlegrounds Mobile India Pro Series-Season 1 (BMPS 2022), Team SouL crowned as champions after putting a sparkling performance throughout the four-day grand finals. The team secured their spot in PUBG Mobile World Invitational 2022 (PMWI 2022), SouL ended the event at 11th position.

In 2023, Team SouL released its BMPS 2022 winning roster and signed Battlegrounds Mobile Pro Series 2023 (BMPS 2023) Champions Manya, NakuL, Jokerr, SPower, Rony with Coach Mayavi and Analyst Ayogi. The roster has secured 4th Position in their first official under SouL banner in Battlegrounds Mobile India Series 2024 (BGIS 2024), Runners up in ESL Snapdragon Pro Series: 2024 BGMI & Champions in BGMI Masters Series Season 3 (BGMS S3), With Several podium finishes in Major Unofficial Tournaments.

After, Horrific exit from Battlegrounds Mobile Pro Series 2025 (BMPS 2025), Team SouL bid farewell to Mayavi & Manya, with Nakul changing its role from Filter to IGL (In Game Leader) and addition of LEGIT, Goblin, Jokerr, Thunder to the team, Team SouL was all ready for the upcoming challenges.

In 2025, roster marked their first major unofficial event as BGMI Master Series Season 4 (BGMS S4), where team ended at third position. Followed by Battlegrounds Mobile India Showdown 2025 (BMSD 2025), Team SouL first Official event under Nakul's Leadership, Team finished the event at third position after a hard-fought battle in 3 Day Grand Finals. After BMSD 2025, The krafton India had one more official event Battlegrounds Mobile India International Cup 2025 (BMIC 2025), Where team SouL ended their run at ninth position.Chennai Esports Global Championship 2025 (CEGC 2025) was the last major event in 2025, Where Team SouL became Champion.

After a consistent second half of 2025, it was time for Team SouL to Lift the Official Trophy, Battlegrounds Mobile India Series 2026 (BGIS 2026) became the event where Team SouL emerged as champions, ending their 4 years long official Championship drought. Team SouL also became the first and Only team to win 4 Official PUBGM/BGMI Tournament in India.

==== Current roster ====
Team SouL BGMI roster
Players
Coaches
8U

| Handle | Name | Nationality |
|---|---|---|
| Nakul | Sharma, Nakul | India |
| Goblin | Paudwal, Harsh | India |
| LEGIT | Choudhary, Yash | India |
| Jokerr | Singh, Khush | India |
| Thunder | Seth, Aaryaman | India |

Head coach

Ayogi (Rahul)

Legend:
- (I) Inactive
- (S) Suspended
- Substitute
- (injured) Injury / Illness

Latest roster transaction: Sept 20, 2025.

=== Call of Duty: Warzone ===
S8UL Esports announced a significant expansion of its international esports presence by unveiling its official Call of Duty: Warzone. The newly revealed lineup features North American esports athletes Colin 'Trikempathy' Bowers-Wilson, Braxton 'Braxtvn' Trice and Ryder 'Ryda' Skarzinski, who will represent S8UL in major Warzone tournaments worldwide, including the prestigious Esports World Cup (EWC) 2025, in Riyadh Saudi Arabia.

S8UL's Call of Duty: Warzone lineup narrowly missed EWC qualification, falling just three points short in the Warzone Online Qualifier (North America). However the management still retained them for World Series of Warzone 2025, Where S8UL finished on 17th Position overall.S8UL parted ways with roster on October 10, 2025.

30 April 2026, S8UL announced its Warzone roster for Esports World Cup 2026 after being selected as Partner for Club Partner Program of Esports World Cup Foundation (EWCF).

==== Current roster ====
S8UL Esports Call of Duty: Warzone roster
Players
Coaches

| Handle | Name | Nationality |
|---|---|---|
| Rxul | Mercado III, Raul | United States |
| Clumizy | Paez, Chris | United States |
| Rated | Prince, Rhys | Wales |

Head coach

- Vacant

Legend:
- (I) Inactive
- (S) Suspended
- Substitute
- (injured) Injury / Illness

Latest roster transaction: April 30, 2026.

=== Chess ===
April 13, 2025, S8UL signed two of the country's top-ranked chess grandmasters, Aravindh Chithambaram and Nihal Sarin, to represent the team at the Esports World Cup 2025. Indian grandmaster Nihal Sarin, representing S8UL Esports, has successfully qualified for the chess playoffs at the Esports World Cup 2025. Nihal ended his EWC 2025 run at 5th-8th position after Magnus Carlsen defeated him in Quarterfinals, Earning 200 Club Points for S8UL esports and reward of $85,000.

Ahead of Esports World Cup 2026, S8UL Announced addition of Grandmaster Pranesh M to their roster, further strengthening the lineup as the organisation balances proven international talent with a string emphasis on Indian participation.

Aravindh Chithambaram has secured qualification for chess at Esports World Cup 2026 after winning road to EWC qualifier at DreamHack Atlanta. With this victory, Chithambaram became the first Indian chess player to qualify for the chess main event at the prestigious tournament, while also earning prize money of US$15,000.

==== Current roster ====
S8UL Esports Chess roster
Players
Coaches

| Handle | Name | Nationality |
|---|---|---|
| Nihal Sarin | Sarin, Nihal | India |
| Aravindh Chithambaram | Chithambaram Veerappan, Aravindh | India |
| Pranesh M | Munirethinam, Pranesh | India |

Head coach

- Vacant

Legend:
- (I) Inactive
- (S) Suspended
- Substitute
- (injured) Injury / Illness

Latest roster transaction: April 30, 2026.

=== EA Sports FC ===
S8UL esports entered the competitive EA Sports FC scene on May 12, 2025. Marking a step in the team's international expansion with the acquisition of Jonas'Jonny' Wirth and Aaron 'HappYMeaL664' Rivera.

Jonny stormed into EAFC Playoffs at Esports World Cup 2025 from Group stage, but lost to ManuBachoore in the Quarterfinals with the score of 2–3.Ending S8UL stint at the FC Pro 25 World Championship at Esports World Cup 2025 on 5th-8th Position earning 200 club points for S8UL and $40,000. Following the failure of HappYMeaL664 for qualification at EWC 2025, S8UL parted ways with him on October 10, 2025.

April 30, 2026, S8UL announced their roster for FC Pro 26 World Championship at Esports World Cup 2026, comprising Jonas Jonny Wirth, julien Fouma Perbal & Aditya Krusher Chadha, Making a strong foot forward in EAFC26.

==== Current roster ====
S8UL Esports EA FC roster
Players
Coaches

| Handle | Name | Nationality |
|---|---|---|
| Jonny | Wirth, Jonny | Germany |
| Fouma | Perbal, Julien | France |
| Krusher | Chadha, Aditya | India |

Head coach

- Vacant

Legend:
- (I) Inactive
- (S) Suspended
- Substitute
- (injured) Injury / Illness

Latest roster transaction: April 30, 2026.

=== Fighting Games ===
Tekken 8 : S8UL Esports is officially making its debut in the international fighting games arena with the signing of top-tier Tekken 8 talents Arja 'Sephiblack' Gamoori and Nino 'Nino' Schwarz. On October 10, 2025, S8UL ended their contract with Tekken Players after failing to qualify for the Fighting games main event at EWC 2025.

In the recent announcement, S8UL fielding its roster for Esports World Cup 2026, in Tekken 8 with Akhil 'Tetsu' Kakar, 'Soul', 'Ak Arhaan' and 'Weak Akuma'. S8UL Signed all Indian players providing global platform for the underdogs who wants to shine on global stage, Symbolizing the trust organisation shows in Indian Athlete Pool.

Fatal Fury : officially making its debut in the Fatal Fury competitive scene with the signing of seasoned athlete Marcoantonio 'Yurikov' Malpica. Known for his versatility and longevity in the FGC, Yurikov becomes S8UL's first Fatal Fury signing as the organization expands its international presence across major esports title.

May 1, 2026, S8UL announced the addition of 'B_Haunt', 'ClosingRegent', 'Prince' for the Esports World Cup 2026.

Street Fighter 6: S8UL has officially revealed its roster in Street Fighter 6, fielding an all Indian lineup having 'B_Haunt', 'ClosingRegent', 'Prince' for the Esports World Cup 2026.

==== Current roster ====
S8UL Esports Fighting Games roster
Players
Coaches

| Handle | Name | Nationality |
|---|---|---|
| Tetsu | Kakar, Akhil | Germany |
| Soul | Singh, Gurashish | India |
| Arhaan | Khan, Sameer | India |
| Weak Akuma | Nakul | India |
| B_Haunt | -, - | India |
| ClosingRegent | -, - | India |
| Prince | -, - | India |

Head coach

- Vacant

Legend:
- (I) Inactive
- (S) Suspended
- Substitute
- (injured) Injury / Illness

Latest roster transaction: April 30, 2026.

=== Fortnite ===
April 2026, S8UL Announced their first ever fortnite roster with the signings of Kaan 'Kaan' Tafli and David 'Faded' Ciubotariu. The roster is already qualified for the Reload Elite Series 2026-Championship held at Esports World Cup 2026 in Paris

==== Current roster ====
S8UL Esports Fortnite roster
Players
Coaches

| Handle | Name | Nationality |
|---|---|---|
| Kaan | Tafli, kaan | Germany |
| Faded | Ciubotariu, David | France |

Head coach

- Vacant

Legend:
- (I) Inactive
- (S) Suspended
- Substitute
- (injured) Injury / Illness

Latest roster transaction: April 30, 2026.

=== Free Fire ===
July 2025, S8UL entered Free Fire (video game) by signing Arshil 'Arsh' Ahmed, Gaurav 'Marvel' Tiwari, Shankar 'Shanku' Thakur, Sumit 'XDivine' Verma, Satyam 'Viper24' Thakur and 'Likhi'. The team first participated in Free Fire MAX India Cup 2025(FFMIC 2025), Which was held as a Lan Event in Lucknow, securing a Top 4 Finish in the tournament and ₹5,00,000 Prize.

In late 2025, S8UL esports has officially signed Team Elite's Free Fire Max team, Led by Lokesh 'Pahadi' karakoti, the new lineup included Jayesh 'Jay' Yadav, Adeeb 'Adeeb' Ansari, Syed 'Armaan' Armaan Ali, Hasan 'Hasan' Haider. The team marked Free Fire Max Asia Invitational 2025 as their first event Under the name S8UL Elite, After the unfortunate exit from Group Stage, the organisation parted ways with Adeeb, Armaan and Hasan while retaining pahadi and Jay.

Jan 20, 2026, Pankaj 'Ronith' Kanwal, Keshav 'Wota' Reddy and Sohan 'Sohan' Sheikh joined S8UL Elite roster alongside Pahadi and Jay. This team Participated in Free Fire Max India Cup 2026 (FFMIC 2026) started in Feb 2026. S8UL Elite eliminated from the tournament after struggling in week 2, despite a strong run in week 1.

Currently, Wota, Sohan and Ronith have left the team S8UL Elite, Pahadi & Jay are at S8UL as Content creators while they will be active in Free Fire Esports as Team Elite.Moving on from Team Elite, S8UL has acquired the roster of Raiders United, The Runner ups of FFMIC 2026 Spring, in June 2026 team competed under banner of S8UL for Free Fore Max Asia Invitational 2026 Summer, where they ranked #6, in July 2026 S8UL competed in Free Fire Esports World Cup, but lost in finals. S8UL will now compete for Free Fire Max India Cup 2026 Fall.

==== Current roster ====
S8UL Esports Free Fire roster
Players
Coaches

| Handle | Name | Nationality |
|---|---|---|
| PRINXZ | -, - | India |
| TROLL | Sharma, Naitik | India |
| JACK07 | -, - | India |
| BUNNY | -, - | India |
| NOOR | -, - | India |

Head coach

- Vacant

Legend:
- (I) Inactive
- (S) Suspended
- Substitute
- (injured) Injury / Illness

Latest roster transaction: June 9, 2026.

=== Honor of Kings ===
S8UL announced its entry in another popular MOBA title Honor of Kings with the Indian roster along with two import players.

S8UL Esports made it to the Honor of Kings World Cup 2026 after securing Top 2 finish in India Qualifier.

==== Current roster ====
S8UL Esports Honor of Kings roster
Players
Coaches

| Handle | Name | Nationality |
|---|---|---|
| Kong | Ang Xinhao | China |
| Doofy | - | Nepal |
| Darkness | Saad Khan | India |
| Meruem | Hayrambh Monga | India |
| Xtreme | Prabhat Kumar | India |
| XesoL | - | India |
| KAEL | Saurabh Jagadale | India |
| Kyurem | Rahul Lavhate | India |

Head coach

Su 'SuHongHong' Hongbo

Legend:
- (I) Inactive
- (S) Suspended
- Substitute
- (injured) Injury / Illness

Roster updated May 1, 2026.

=== League of Legends ===
S8UL Esports has officially announced its entry into League of Legends(LoL) by signing one of South Asia's leading roster.

The team crowned as Champions in Legends Ascend South Asia 2025, India's first Publisher driven amateur LOL tournament.S8UL earned their slot to LCP 2026 Promotion-Wild Card Playoffs. S8UL finished the tournament at the bottom of the tournament without winning a single match.

==== Current roster ====
S8UL Esports League of Legends roster
Players
Coaches

| Handle | Name | Nationality |
|---|---|---|
| infii | Aakash Shandilya | India |
| Kat Bot | Akshaj Shenoy | India |
| Lotus | Mihir Ranjan | India |
| Nero | Ahmed Shahid | India |
| Deadcorporal | Sanindhya Malik | India |
| KAKA | - | India |
| Panda | - | India |

Head coach

Su 'SuHongHong' Hongbo

Legend:
- (I) Inactive
- (S) Suspended
- Substitute
- (injured) Injury / Illness

Roster updated September 13, 2025.

=== Mobile Legends ===
Indian Powerhouse S8UL Esports announced in May 2025 its official entry in MLBB esports for Mobile Legends: Bang Bang Mid Season Cup 2025, with acquisition of renowned North American team BloodThirstyKings (BTK).The roster was already qualified for Mid Season Cup 2025 following a dominant run in recently concluded North American Challenger Tournament (NACT).

Unfortunately, S8UL Esports faced disqualified from the Mid Season Cup 2025 after two of their players violated the competitive rules.S8UL confirmed that the team is no longer able to compete, unable to meet the tournament's minimum roster requirements and is not eligible for roster changes according to the rules. Resulting in S8UL disbanding its MLBB roster.

In late 2025, S8UL announced its return to the MOBA Legends: 5v5!, Signing all Indian roster Anti, J, Asuna, Radium, APEX.The team played its first event at Mythic Showdown Season 2, S8UL Esports had an impressive run throughout the tournament and proved to be one of the most competitive teams in the event.Although they fell short in the final series, S8UL secured 2nd place and took home INR 100,000 in prize money.

S8UL Esports emerged victorious in the Rai Star X Gyan Gaming MLBB Cup 2026 (R&G Cup) held in Kolkata on Feb 18, in a best-of-seven decider, S8UL held their nerve in a fiercely contested series, closing the matchup 4-3 against Godlike Esports.

Following the R&G Cup, Team has undergone some roster changes where S8UL released 'Abhi' and 'Kakarot' and signed an indo player Muhammad 'Ronn' Syahroni and Bikash 'bobe' Tamang from Nepal. Strengthning the roster ahead of Moba Legends Master Series 2025 (MLMS), A direct gateaway for Moba Legends: Bang Bang Midseason Cup 2026 (MSC2026) at Esports World Cup 2026.

S8UL Esports ended its MLMS run at 3-4th position after losing the semi-finals against Godlike Esports, With that S8UL gets out of the race from qualifying for MSC2026.

==== Current roster ====
S8UL Esports MOBA Legends: 5V5! roster
Players
Coaches

| Handle | Name | Nationality |
|---|---|---|
| Anti | - | India |
| J | - | India |
| Ronn | Muhammad Syahroni | Indonesia |
| Bobe | Bikash Tamang | Nepal |
| Radium | Chirag | India |
| APEX | Muhammad Saad | India |

Head coach

- Vacant

Legend:
- (I) Inactive
- (S) Suspended
- Substitute
- (injured) Injury / Illness

Roster updated March 29, 2026.

=== Pokemon ===
Pokemon Go : S8UL has signed Pokemon Go World Championship 2025 winner Ved "Beelzeboy" Bamb to its roster, Beelzeboy had also won Pokemon Go India National Championship title in 2024.

==== Current roster ====
S8UL Esports Pokemon Go roster
| Players | Coaches |
|---|---|
| Handle / Name / Nationality; Beelzeboy / Bamb, Ved / India | Head coach: Vacant |
| Legend: (I) Inactive; (S) Suspended; Substitute; (injured) Injury / Illness | Latest roster transaction: March 11, 2026. |

Pokemon Unite : S8UL entered Pokemon Unite competitive scene in 2022, Signing roster of Melon, All Might, Cursed, Ghoul, Inosuke and Vox. Team Played in Pokemon UNITE Championship Series 2022 - India Championship as their first ever official evenet and finished at 5-6th position in the event. Later Team also participated in Pokémon UNITE India Open 2022 securing a podium finish (3rd) and a Slot in Pokémon UNITE Asia Champions League 2023 - India, Where team again secured 3rd Place.

In 2023, The roster took part in Pokemon UNITE Championship Series 2023 - India Championship with the roster of All Might, Badshah, Snowyy, Kyurem, ReX and Reapy, The Showed excellent performance and clinched the Championship with 2–0 sweep against FS Esports in Finals, Earning their spot in Pokémon World Championships 2023 Tokyo, However, The Indian Champions failed to show their potential in the contest and ended the event at 17-24th Position.

In 2024 Pokemon UNITE Championship Series - India Qualifier, S8UL again rise at the top, Claiming the Championship by defeating Zenigame squad by 2–1.With the Championship, Team also registered their spot in Pokemon World Championship 2024 taking place in Honolulu, United states. Unfortunately, Team withdrew from the competition due to Visa Issues.

Year 2025 started with the Pokémon UNITE Asia Champions League 2025 - India, S8UL esports did not performed up to the mark and missed the qualification for Pokemon Unite Asia Championship 2025.However, Team Bounced back by securing Pokemon UNITE Championship Series 2025 - India Qualifier Championship.The Team also booked their spot at the Pokemon Unite World Championship 2025. Another Big stage and another bad performance from the team put them in the 17-24th position again.

In the current year, S8UL has participated in Pokémon UNITE Asia Champions League 2026 - India & Pokemon UNITE Winter Tournament 2026 - India where the team ended their run on 6th & 5-8th Position respectively. After decreased performance in first two Tournaments, the team has gone under roster changes where Badshah, ReX, Snowyy & Kyurem left and S8UL signed KAi, Novaa, Wolf & Qing ahead of Pokemon UNITE Championship Series 2026 - India Qualifier.The team showcased improved performance in the tournament, with no losses in the whole tournament. As a result, S8UL Esports emerged as Champions of the India Qualifier, Recording their 4th Consecutive Title in 4 Years, Underlining the Organisation's sustained dominance in the title. With the Championship, the team has also earned their spot for Pokemon Unite World Championship 2026 in San Francisco.

==== Current roster ====
S8UL Esports Pokemon Unite roster
Players
Coaches

| Handle | Name | Nationality |
|---|---|---|
| All Might | Manmohan Singh | India |
| KAi | Darshan Nate | India |
| Novaa | Anklesh Satelkar | India |
| Wolf | Naitik Jain | India |
| Qing | MD Sarim Hasan | India |

Head coach

Aditya "Reapy" Bhujbal

Legend:
- (I) Inactive
- (S) Suspended
- Substitute
- (injured) Injury / Illness

Roster updated April 24, 2026.

=== PUBG: Battlegrounds ===
Indian esports S8UL has officially set its sights on winning PUBG, signing the PUBG PC roster, Team Question Mark (QM). Having won the PUBG Continental Series 7 Europe in 2022, alongside a win at the PUBG Global Series 8. The squad also has a top-three finish at the PUBG Global Series 2 in 2023, a top-seven finish at the PUBG Global Championship 2022.

==== Current roster ====
S8UL Esports PUBG: Battlegrounds roster
Players
Coaches

| Handle | Name | Nationality |
|---|---|---|
| ADOUZ1E | Roman Zinovev | Russia |
| Bestoloch | Andrey Ionov | Russia |
| f1lfirst | Mansur Tsimpaev | Russia |
| Molodoct | Nikita Odobesku | Russia |

Head coach

Yermek "Ermaak" Torebekov

Legend:
- (I) Inactive
- (S) Suspended
- Substitute
- (injured) Injury / Illness

Roster updated April 16, 2026.

=== TrackMania ===
S8UL Esports announced their entry in Trackmania by signing Neal, Spark and Whizzy, for the upcoming Esports World Cup 2026. All 3 Players are currently participating in Qualifiers for the biggest stage.

==== Current roster ====
S8UL Esports Trackmania roster
Players
Coaches

| Handle | Name | Nationality |
|---|---|---|
| Neal | Neal Kamdar | United States |
| Spark | Kunal Upreti | India |
| Whizzy | Alexander Page | United Kingdom |

Head coach

- Vacant

Legend:
- (I) Inactive
- (S) Suspended
- Substitute
- (injured) Injury / Illness

Roster updated April 16, 2026.

=== Valorant ===
S8UL Esports started its valorant journey back in 2021, where they signed Binks, EdiT99, ezzzyyyxD, Kuzuri, notFOX and strixx. By the end of the 2024, S8UL disbanded its operations in Valorant.

S8UL Esports entered into the competitive VALORANT scene with a stacked roster featuring top-tier Indian talent and international stars in 2025.The roster consists of HyBr1D, D1SEASE, AceStaRRRRR, miz, k1ngkappa, hellff and Techno along with coach HellrangeR. The team roped in Hoax as their captain in the midseason of Valorant Challengers 2025 South Asia. The team finished the 2025 season as Runner's Up.

S8UL Esports has officially revealed its new Valorant lineup for the 2026 competitive season on March 2, 2026, with the organization unveiling a roster consisting of SkRossi, RvK, Yuvi, Anq, and xexxar, along with Vikrant “Hacker” Pujari as head coach. The team took part in Valorant Challengers South Asia (VCSA) 2026 Split 1 and the tournament concluded with S8UL Esports Winning the Title.

==== Current roster ====
S8UL Esports Valorant roster
Players
Coaches

| Handle | Name | Nationality |
|---|---|---|
| Anq | Ilya Matyash | Russia |
| RvK | Rishi Vijayakumar | India |
| SkRossi | Ganesh Gangadhar | India |
| xexxar | Alen Kadyrbayev | Kazakhstan |
| Yuvi | Yuvraj Singh | India |

Head coach

Vikrant “Hacker” Pujari

Legend:
- (I) Inactive
- (S) Suspended
- Substitute
- (injured) Injury / Illness

Roster updated March 2, 2026.

== Former Divisions ==
=== Call of Duty: Mobile ===
S8UL Entered Call of Duty: Mobile in 2020, they signed players, Moonscope, Argon, MonK, Xenon and Toxy, but in 2021, the team disbanded its roster.

In 2025, S8UL returned to CODM. Inconsistent performance, regular team changes made the team unstable, resulting in S8UL discontinuing its operation in CODM.

=== StarCraft II ===
S8UL expanded its presence by entering StarCraft II, signing South Korean Veteran GuMiHo, ahead of Esports World Cup 2025. Despite several attempts, GuMiHo failed to qualify for EWC 2025. The organisation decided to withdraw from the scene and releases GuMiHo.

== Achievements ==
BGMI/PUBG MOBILE - Team SouL

- PMIS: 2019
- PMCO India: 2019
- BMPS: 2022
- BGIS: 2026

CHESS

Arvindh Chithambaram

- Dreamhack: Atlanta 2026

Honor of Kings

- Honor of Kings International Championship - India Qualifier: 2026

League of Legends

- Legends Ascend South Asia: 2025

Pokémon UNITE

- Pokémon UNITE Championship Series - INDIA: 2023, 2024, 2025, 2026

Trackmania

Spark

- Trackmania India Cup: 2026

VALORANT

- VCSA Split 1: 2026

== Awards ==
| Year | Category | Award | Result | Reference |
|---|---|---|---|---|
| 2022 | Content Group of the Year | Esports Awards | Won | |
| 2023 | Content Group of the Year | Esports Awards | Won | |
| 2024 | Content Group of the Year | Esports Awards | Won | |
| 2024 | Mobile Gaming | MOBIES Award | Won | |
| 2025 | Content Group of the Year | Esports Awards | Won | |

== External links for S8ul ==
- Official website
