= Jonathan Gaming =

Indian professional esports player (born 2002)

Jonathan16
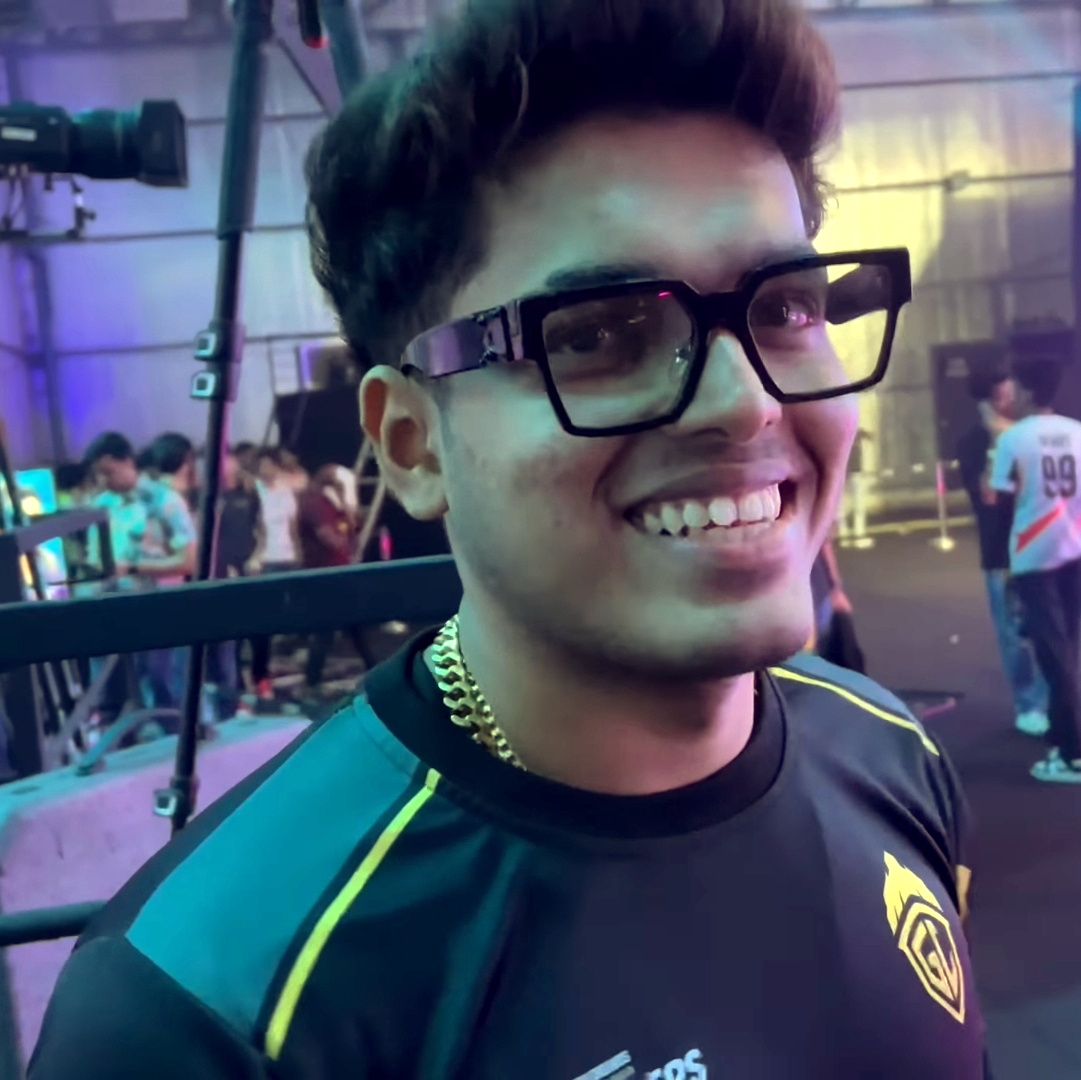
- Amaral in 2023

Personal information
- Born: Jonathan Jude Amaral; 21 September 2002 (age 24); Verna, Goa, India

Current team
- Team: TEAM APEX GAMING
- Role: Assaulter
- Game: Battlegrounds Mobile India

Career information
- Games: Battlegrounds Mobile India; PUBG Mobile
- Playing career: 2019–present

Team history
- 2019–2020: Entity Gaming
- 2020–2021: TSM Entity
- 2021–2026: Godlike Esports
- 2026: Team Apex Gaming

YouTube information
- Channel: JONATHAN GAMING
- Years active: 2018–present
- Genre: Gaming
- Subscribers: 7.6million
- Views: 747.47 million
- Last updated: 28 March 2026

Jonathan Jude Amaral (born 21 September 2002), known professionally as Jonathan Gaming, is an Indian professional esports player known for playing Battlegrounds Mobile India (BGMI) and Pubg Mobile (PUBGM).

== Early life ==
Jonathan Jude Amaral was born on 21 September 2002, to Jude and Leticia Amaral, in Verna, Goa, India.

== Career ==
Amaral began his esports career with the esports team Entity Gaming, which later merged to form TSM Entity. Then he played for Godlike Esports for quite a few time before creating his own team, Team Apex Gaming. He was selected to represent India at the 2021 PUBG Mobile Global Championship, despite his fourth-place finish at the BGIS 2021 tournament. They were placed #13 in that tournament. At the 2020 PMIS Semifinals, Amaral recorded 16 kills, the highest individual kill count ever recorded in a tournament.

Amaral and a group of fellow Indian streamers and content creators made a request to BGMI to ban cheaters from the platform. 7Sea Esports extended an offer to Amaral to join their team, but he declined due to coordination difficulties. Following the Government of India's ban of BGMI, Amaral became one of India's top esports players. Known for staying away from controversies, his skills have made him popular in the Indian gaming scene.

During the 2022 Esports Award, Amaral secured the second place in the Esports Mobile Players of the Year category. FanClash, an esports fantasy platform, announced in 2023 that Amaral will be serving as their brand ambassador. In a livestream on 16 November 2023, Amaral announced himself as an official Red Bull player.In January 2026, Amaral won three titles at the inaugural Krafton India Awards 2025, including Influencer of the Year, Fans' Choice: Favourite Creator of the Year (Male), and Fans' Choice: Favourite Esports Player of the Year.

He is also known to be the superior of fellow esports player, Goblin (Harsh Paudwal) a.k.a "the most dangerous player in the lobby". Goblin is also said to have extremely strong 1v1 and fearless gameplay. He plays for team Soul a.k.a "Gunde (Goons)", which is not performing really well.

During the Battlegrounds Mobile India Series (BGIS) 2026 Survival Stage, Amaral was benched from Team GodLike's active lineup for the first time in his competitive career. He was temporarily replaced by GodZ following the semi-final rounds. Team management cited the roster change as a strategic decision focused on overall team performance, which ultimately helped Team GodLike secure a first-place finish in the survival stage and qualify for the LAN finals in Chennai.

In April 2026, Amaral announced the launch of his esports organization, Team Apex Gaming (TAG), through an official video on his social media platforms.

== Achievements ==
Year	Tournaments (Tier-A)	Organizers	Team	Result
2019-11-10	PMCO - 2019 Fall Split: South Asia	Tencent Games, PUBG Corporation, NODWIN Gaming	Entity Gaming	Won
2020-07-05	PMIS 2020	Tencent Games, PUBG Corporation, NODWIN Gaming	TSM Entity	Won
2021-09-12	Skyesports Championship 3.0	Skyesports	Godlike	Won
2022-07-17	BGMS - 2022	NODWIN Gaming	Godlike	#2
2024-09-29	BMPS - 2024	KRAFTON, Tesseract Esports	Godlike	#3
2025-04-27	BGIS 2025	KRAFTON, Tesseract Esports	Godlike	#2

== Awards ==
Year	Tier	Tournament	Award	Team
2020-08-09	S-Tier	PUBG Mobile World League (PMWL) 2020: East	Week 2 &3 MVP	TSM Entity
2025-04-27	A-Tier	Battlegrounds Mobile India Series (BGIS) 2025	Finals MVP	Godlike
2022-07-17	A-Tier	BGMI Masters Series (BGMS) 2022	Finals MVP	Godlike
2021-10-31	A-Tier	LOCO War of Glory: Grand Finals	MVP #1	Godlike
2021-09-12	A-Tier	Skyesports Championship 3.0	MVP	Godlike
