= Zeyan Shafiq =

Indian software developer (born 2002)

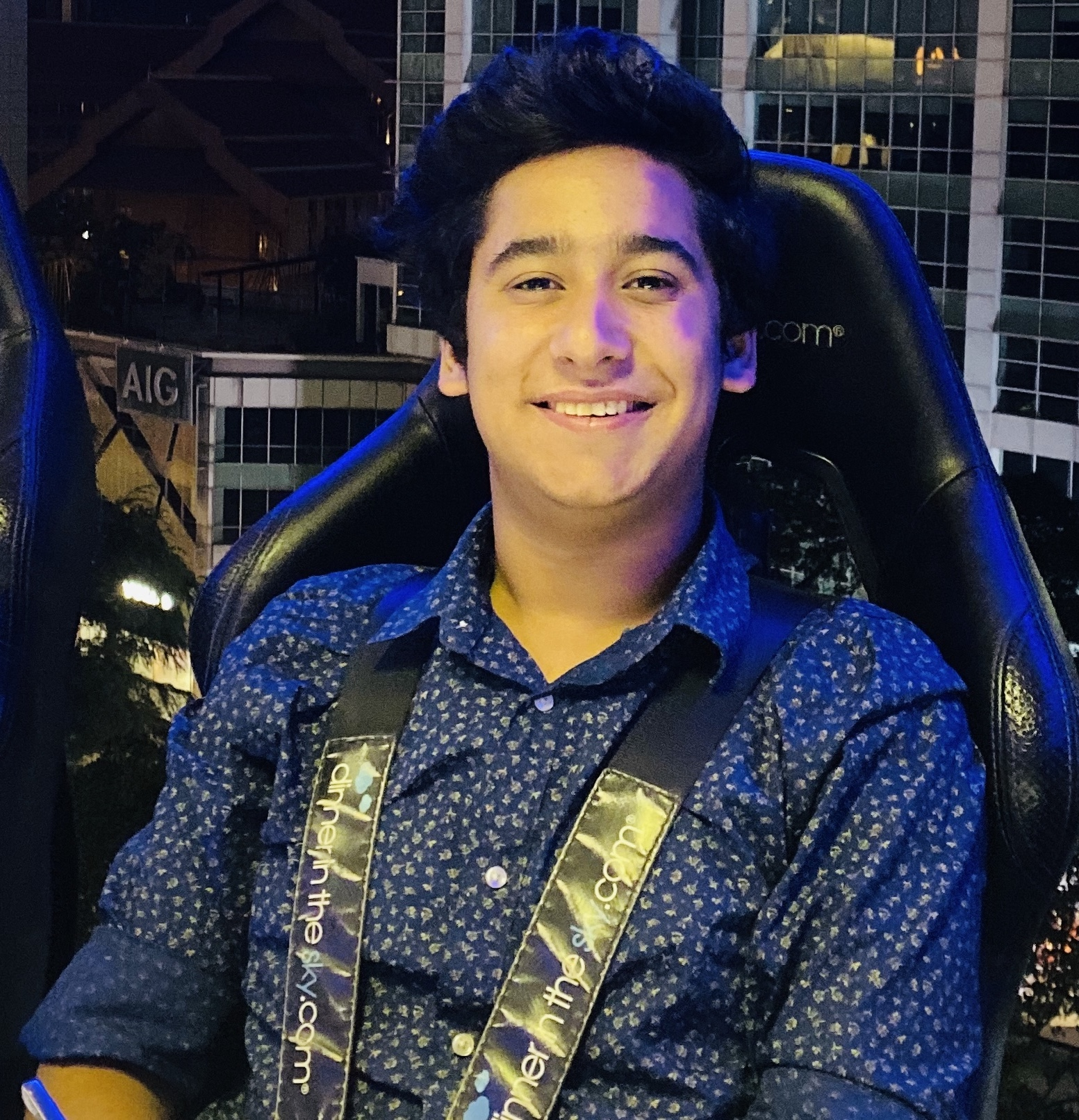
- Shafiq In 2019
- Born: Zeyan Jeelani Shafiq; 21 July 2002 (age 24); Anantnag, Jammu and Kashmir
- Education: Radiant Public School
- Occupations: Software and app developer, CEO of Stalwart Esports
- Known for: KashBook, Stalwart Esports

Zeyan Shafiq (born Zeyan Jeelani; 21 July 2002) is an Indian software and app developer from Anantnag, Jammu and Kashmir. He founded KashBook in 2017 after the Jammu and Kashmir government banned social media services in the Kashmir Valley and started Stalwart Esports in 2020 to promote India in competitive esports.

== Personal life and education ==
Shafiq was born on 21 July 2002 to a Kashmiri Muslim family in Anantnag, Jammu and Kashmir. His father, Shafiq Ul Hassan, is a pharmaceutical distributor, and his mother, Asiya Shafiq, a civil servant in the Jammu and Kashmir revenue department. He studied at the Army Goodwill School in Rajouri and completed his matriculation exams in January 2017 from the Radiant Public School. He planned to study computer science engineering.

== KashBook ==
Along with his 19-year-old friend Uzair Jan, Shafiq developed KashBook in 2013, but decided to relaunch the website after a social media ban was imposed in Kashmir Valley by the PDP government on 26 April 2017. They developed a website and mobile app so that people in Kashmir could communicate without connecting to a VPN. KashBook had more than 10,500 users as of May 2017.

The book India Connected by Ravi Agrawal includes a chapter about Shafiq, the internet shutdown in Kashmir, and his take on it with KashBook.

== Stalwart Esports ==
In January 2020, Shafiq started Stalwart Esports, a pan-India esports organisation to promote India's position and participation in competitive eSports. After the PUBG ban in India, he decided to set up international operations for his esport organisation and introduced players from Pakistani team FreeStyle Esports, who already had qualified and played the PUBG World Championship. He was concerned about reprisals, but none came. It was an unprecedented alliance between Indian and Pakistani gamers.

After the Indian government banned BGMI, Shafiq extended support to Indian esport organizations assisting them in transitioning Battlegrounds Mobile India (formerly known as PUBG Mobile) operations to the rest of the world.
