= PUBG Mobile Global Championship 2023 =

PUBG Mobile tournament

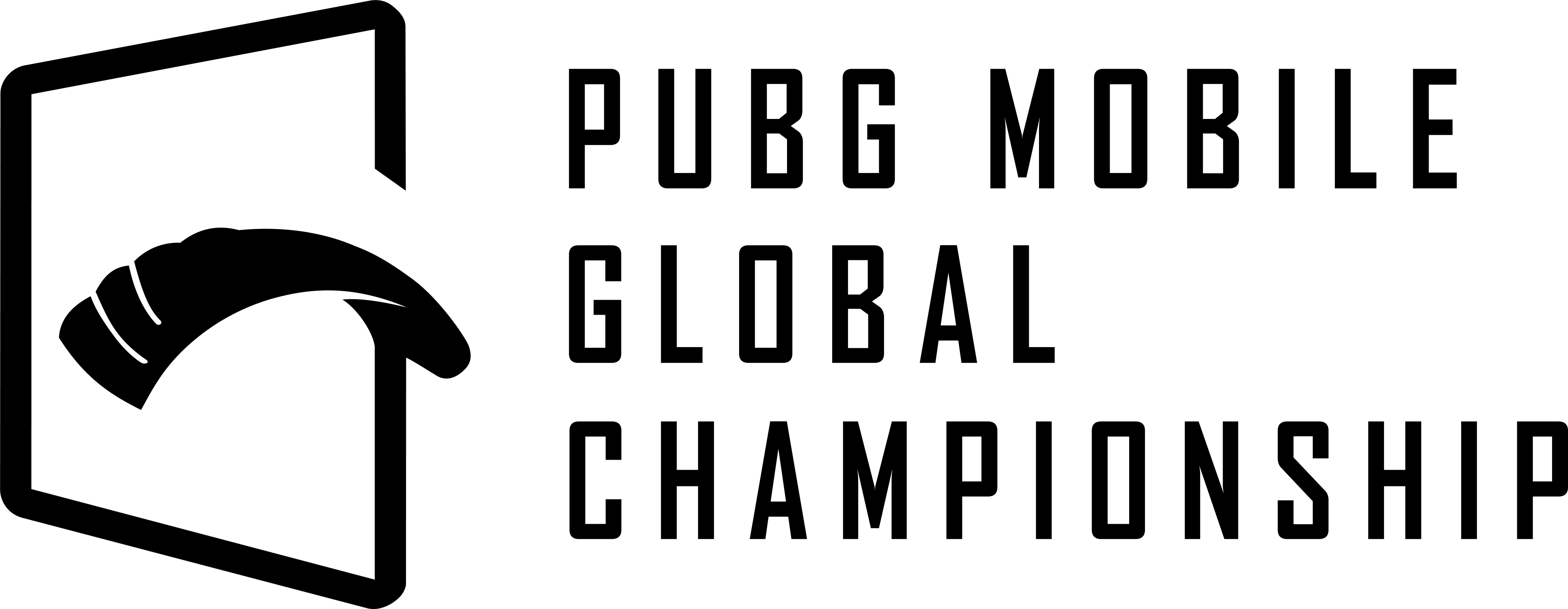

Tournament information
- Game: PUBG Mobile
- Dates: 2 November–10 December 2023
- Administrator: Level Infinite, Krafton, VSPO
- Tournament format: Battle Royale
- Host(s): Turkey & Malaysia
- Venue(s): (Malaysia) Battle Arena, Kuala Lumpur (League Stage) (Turkey) Ülker Sports and Event Hall, Istanbul (Grand Finals)
- Participants: 50 teams
- Purse: $3,000,000
- Website: https://esports.pubgmobile.com

Final positions
- Champion: (Mongolia) IHC Esports
- 1st runner-up: (Mongolia) Stalwart Esports
- 2nd runner-up: (Brazil) Alpha7 Esports
- MVP: (Mongolia) Zolboot "Zyol" Bayartsengel (IHC)

PUBG Mobile Global Championship 2023 was the final event of the 2023 PUBG Mobile competitive season. In the PMGC 2023, 48 qualified teams participated in the League Stage across the phases of Group Stage, Survival Stage & Last Chance in Kuala Lumpur, Malaysia as a closed offline event in November 2–26. The Grand Finals was held in Istanbul, Turkey on December 8–10 and 14 qualified teams from the League Stage are joined with the host country and PEL teams. The championship featured a total prizepool of $3,000,000 USD.

== Venue ==
The grand finals of PUBG Mobile Global Championship 2023 was announced to be held in Istanbul.

Battle Arena (located in Kuala Lumpur) hosted the league stage. On the other hand, the grand finals was held at the Ülker Sports and Event Hall in Istanbul.

League Stage	Grand Finals
(Malaysia) Kuala Lumpur	(Turkey) Istanbul
Battle Arena	Ülker Sports and Event Hall

== Participating teams ==
=== Grand Finals invited ===
Region	Invitation name	Team name
Europe	Host Country Invitation	(Turkey) S2G Esports
China	2023 PEL Points #1	(China) Titan Esports Club

=== League Stage ===
Region	Event	Qualification method	Team name
Southeast Asia	PMWI 2023	PMWI Champion's Region	(Thailand) HAIL Esports
Southeast Asia	PMGC Points	2023 PMGC Points - Indonesia #1	(Indonesia) Perjisa EVOS
Southeast Asia	PMGC Points	2023 PMGC Points - Malaysia #1	(Malaysia) Yoodo Alliance
Southeast Asia	PMGC Points	2023 PMGC Points - Thailand #1	(Thailand) Vampire Esports
Southeast Asia	PMGC Points	2023 PMGC Points - Vietnam #1	(Vietnam) D'Xavier
Southeast Asia	PMGC Points	2023 PMGC Points - SEA Wildcard #1	(Myanmar) Genesis Esports
Southeast Asia	PMSL SEA	PMSL SEA Fall 2023 Champion	(Indonesia) Alter Ego Ares
Southeast Asia	PMSL SEA	PMSL SEA Fall 2023 Runner-up	(Thailand) FaZe Clan
Southeast Asia	PMSL SEA	PMSL SEA Fall 2023 3rd place	(Indonesia) Bigetron Red Villains
Southeast Asia	PMSL SEA	PMSL SEA Fall 2023 4th place	(Thailand) Xerxia Esports
Southeast Asia	PMSL SEA	PMSL SEA Fall 2023 5th place	(Indonesia) Morph GPX
Southeast Asia	PMSL SEA	PMSL SEA Fall 2023 6th place	(Malaysia) SEM9
South Asia	Special Invite	Special Invite #1	(Nepal) DRS Gaming
South Asia	PMGC Points	2023 PMGC Points - South Asia #1	(Mongolia) Stalwart Esports
South Asia	PMGC Points	2023 PMGC Points - Pakistan #1	(Pakistan) Agonxi8 Esports
South Asia	PMPL South Asia Championship	PMPL South Asia Championship Fall 2023 ~~Champion~~ Runner-up	(Mongolia) 4Merical Vibes
South Asia	PMPL South Asia Championship	PMPL South Asia Championship Fall 2023 ~~Runner-up~~ 4th place	(Mongolia) NB Esports
South Asia	PMPL South Asia Championship	PMPL South Asia Championship Fall 2023 ~~3rd place~~ 5th place	(Mongolia) IHC Esports
South Asia	PMPL South Asia Championship	PMPL South Asia Championship Fall 2023 ~~4th place~~ 6th place	(Pakistan) Seventh Element
Middle East & Africa	PMGC Points	2023 PMGC Points - Arabia #1	(Iraq) Nigma Galaxy
Middle East & Africa	PMGC Points	2023 PMGC Points - Africa #1	(Kazakhstan) Falcons White
Middle East & Africa	PMPL MEA Championship	PMPL MEA Championship Fall 2023 Champion	(Saudi Arabia) Quest Esports
Middle East & Africa	PMPL MEA Championship	PMPL MEA Championship Fall 2023 Runner-up	(Bahrain) Brute Force
Middle East & Africa	PMPL MEA Championship	PMPL MEA Championship Fall 2023 3rd place	(United Arab Emirates) NASR Esports
Middle East & Africa	PMPL MEA Championship	PMPL MEA Championship Fall 2023 4th place	(Commonwealth of Independent States) RUKH eSports
Europe	Special Invite	Special Invite #2	(Russia) Gaimin Gladiators
Europe	PMGC Points	2023 PMGC Points - Europe #1	(Commonwealth of Independent States) MadBulls
Europe	PMGC Points	2023 PMGC Points - Turkey ~~#1~~ #2	(Turkey) Next Rüya
Europe	PMPL European Championship	PMPL European Championship Fall 2023 ~~Champion~~ Runner-up	(Turkey) BRA Esports
Europe	PMPL European Championship	PMPL European Championship Fall 2023 ~~Runner-up~~ 4th place	(Commonwealth of Independent States) Major Pride
Europe	PMPL European Championship	PMPL European Championship Fall 2023 ~~3rd place~~ 5th place	(Turkey) Melise Esports
Europe	PMPL European Championship	PMPL European Championship Fall 2023 ~~4th place~~ 6th place	(Kazakhstan) Konina Power
Europe	PMPL European Championship	PMPL European Championship Fall 2023 ~~5th place~~ 7th place	(Russia) De Muerte
Americas	PMGC Points	2023 PMGC Points - North America #1	(China) N Hyper Esports
Americas	PMGC Points	2023 PMGC Points - Latin America #1	(Chile) Team Queso
Americas	PMGC Points	2023 PMGC Points - Brazil #1	(Brazil) Loops Esports
Americas	PMPL Americas Championship	PMPL Americas Championship Fall 2023 Champion	(Brazil) Influence Rage
Americas	PMPL Americas Championship	PMPL Americas Championship Fall 2023 Runner-up	(Brazil) Intense Game
Americas	PMPL Americas Championship	PMPL Americas Championship Fall 2023 3rd place	(Brazil) iNCO Gaming
Americas	PMPL Americas Championship	PMPL Americas Championship Fall 2023 4th place	(Brazil) Alpha7 Esports
China	PEL Points	2023 PEL Points #2	(China) Weibo Gaming
China	PEL Points	2023 PEL Points #3	(China) Tianba
China	PEL Qualifier	PMGC 2023 - PEL Qualifier Champion	(China) Six Two Eight
South Korea & Japan	PMPS Korea	PMPS 2023 Season 3 Champion	(South Korea) Duksan Esports
South Korea & Japan	PMGC Points	2023 PMGC Points - PMPS ~~#1~~ #2	(South Korea) Dplus KIA
South Korea & Japan	PMJL	PMJL S3 Phase 2 Champion	(Japan) Reject
South Korea & Japan	PMJL	PMJL S3 Phase 2 Runner-up	(Japan) BEENOSTORM
South Korea & Japan	Rivals Cup	Rivals Cup 2023 Champion	(South Korea) Nongshim RedForce

== Format ==
The tournament begins with a Group Stage featuring 48 teams divided into 3 groups of 16. Each group competes over a specific week consisting of 24 matches, spread across 4 matchdays, with 6 matches each day. The top 3 teams from each group advance directly to the Grand Finals, while teams placing 4th to 11th move on to the Survival Stage, and the bottom 5 teams are eliminated. In the Survival Stage, the 24 remaining teams are split into 3 groups of 8, playing 18 matches over 3 days in a Round-Robin format. The top 16 teams progress to the Last Chance stage, with the bottom 8 teams being eliminated. The Last Chance stage features 16 teams competing in 12 matches, where the top 5 teams secure their spots in the Grand Finals, and the bottom 11 teams are eliminated. The Grand Finals consist of 16 teams, including the 14 qualified from the League Stage and 2 directly invited teams, competing in 18 matches to determine the champion.

== Schedule ==
Round	Date	Teams
Group Stage	2 November 2023	Group Green
Group Stage	3 November 2023	Group Green
Group Stage	4 November 2023	Group Green
Group Stage	5 November 2023	Group Green
Group Stage	9 November 2023	Group Red
Group Stage	10 November 2023	Group Red
Group Stage	11 November 2023	Group Red
Group Stage	12 November 2023	Group Red
Group Stage	16 November 2023	Group Yellow
Group Stage	17 November 2023	Group Yellow
Group Stage	18 November 2023	Group Yellow
Group Stage	19 November 2023	Group Yellow
Survival Stage	22 November 2023	Group Green (S) vs Yellow (S)
Survival Stage	23 November 2023	Group Green (S) vs Red (S)
Survival Stage	24 November 2023	Group Red (S) vs Yellow (S)
Last Chance	25 November 2023	Top 16 teams from Survival Stage
Last Chance	26 November 2023	Top 16 teams from Survival Stage
Grand Finals	8 December 2023	2 invited teams + Top 3 teams from each group of Group Stage + Top 5 teams from Last Chance
Grand Finals	9 December 2023	2 invited teams + Top 3 teams from each group of Group Stage + Top 5 teams from Last Chance
Grand Finals	10 December 2023	2 invited teams + Top 3 teams from each group of Group Stage + Top 5 teams from Last Chance

== Group Stage ==
=== Group Draw ===
Group Green		Group Red		Group Yellow	
Xerxia Esports	Persija EVOS	FaZe Clan	HAIL Esports	Vampire Esports	Bigetron Red Villains
Alter Ego Ares	D'Xavier	Morph GPX	Yoodo Alliance	SEM9	Genesis Esports
Alpha7 Esports	Loops Esports	iNCO Gaming	Intense Game	Influence Rage	Team Queso
Melise Esports	BRA Esports	N Hyper Esports	Konina Power	Major Pride	De Muerte
MadBulls	Quest Esports	Next Rüya	NASR Eports	Brute Force	RUKH eSports
Falcons White	Stalwart Esports	Nigma Galaxy	NB Esports	IHC Esports	4Merical Vibes
Agonxi8 Esports	Tianba	Seventh Element	Six Two Eight	Weibo Gaming	Dplus KIA
Reject	Gaimin Gladiators	Duksan Esports	Nongshim RedForce	BEENOSTORM	DRS Gaming

=== Group Green standings ===
Rank	Team	WWCD	Placement	Elims	Total points	Qualification
1	Loops Esports	4	76	144	220	Qualified for the Grand Finals
2	Alpha7 Esports	2	73	131	204	Qualified for the Grand Finals
3	Stalwart Esports	4	77	121	198	Qualified for the Grand Finals
4	Reject	3	73	115	188	Advanced to the Survival Stage
5	Persija EVOS	2	59	99	158	Advanced to the Survival Stage
6	MadBulls	0	56	83	139	Advanced to the Survival Stage
7	D'Xavier	0	46	87	133	Advanced to the Survival Stage
8	Alter Ego Ares	2	43	88	131	Advanced to the Survival Stage
9	Melise Esports	1	40	83	123	Advanced to the Survival Stage
10	Gaimin Gladiators	2	43	78	121	Advanced to the Survival Stage
11	Quest Esports	1	36	80	116	Advanced to the Survival Stage
12	Tianba	1	40	75	115	Eliminated
13	Falcons White	1	34	64	98	Eliminated
14	BRA Esports	0	23	72	95	Eliminated
15	Agonxi8 Esports	1	27	58	85	Eliminated
16	Xerxia Esports	0	22	41	63	Eliminated

=== Group Red standings ===
Rank	Team	WWCD	Placement	Elims	Total points	Qualification
1	Nongshim RedForce	2	75	128	203	Qualified for the Grand Finals
2	Six Two Eight	3	65	121	186	Qualified for the Grand Finals
3	Morph GPX	3	51	127	178	Qualified for the Grand Finals
4	Nigma Galaxy	2	70	95	165	Advanced to the Survival Stage
5	Duksan Esports	4	63	100	163	Advanced to the Survival Stage
6	Yoodo Alliance	1	69	93	162	Advanced to the Survival Stage
7	N Hyper Esports	3	52	91	143	Advanced to the Survival Stage
8	FaZe Clan	1	50	80	130	Advanced to the Survival Stage
9	NB Esports	1	43	82	125	Advanced to the Survival Stage
10	NASR Esports	2	44	79	123	Advanced to the Survival Stage
11	iNCO Gaming	0	43	80	123	Advanced to the Survival Stage
12	Intense Game	1	32	86	118	Eliminated
13	Next Rüya	0	32	73	105	Eliminated
14	Seventh Element	0	34	67	101	Eliminated
15	HAIL Esports	0	23	61	84	Eliminated
16	Konina Power	1	22	47	69	Eliminated

=== Group Yellow standings ===
Rank	Team	WWCD	Placement	Elims	Total points	Qualification
1	Major Pride	2	67	116	183	Qualified for the Grand Finals
2	4Merical Vibes	1	59	118	177	Qualified for the Grand Finals
3	Weibo Gaming	3	66	107	173	Qualified for the Grand Finals
4	Bigetron Red Villains	2	57	116	173	Advanced to the Survival Stage
5	Dplus KIA	2	53	103	156	Advanced to the Survival Stage
6	Influence Rage	1	59	83	142	Advanced to the Survival Stage
7	Team Queso	3	60	80	140	Advanced to the Survival Stage
8	Brute Force	2	53	87	140	Advanced to the Survival Stage
9	RUKH eSports	1	53	84	137	Advanced to the Survival Stage
10	IHC Esports	1	35	93	128	Advanced to the Survival Stage
11	SEM9	1	47	78	125	Advanced to the Survival Stage
12	Vampire Esports	3	47	76	123	Eliminated
13	De Muerte	1	43	64	107	Eliminated
14	Genesis Esports	1	27	78	105	Eliminated
15	DRS Gaming	0	24	70	94	Eliminated
16	BEENOSTORM	0	18	48	66	Eliminated

== Survival Stage & Last Chance ==
=== Survival Stage Group Draw ===
Group Green	Group Red	Group Yellow
Reject	Nigma Galaxy	Bigetron Red Villains
Persija EVOS	Duksan Esports	Dplus KIA
MadBulls	Yoodo Alliance	Influence Rage
D'Xavier	N Hyper Esports	Team Queso
ALter Ego Ares	FaZe Clan	Brute Force
Melise Esports	NB Esports	RUKH eSports
Gaimin Gladiators	NASR Esports	IHC Esports
Quest Esports	iNCO Gaming	SEM9

=== Survival Stage standings ===
Rank	Team	WWCD	Placement	Elims	Total points	Qualification
1	Influence Rage	1	39	68	107	Advance to the Last Chance
2	MadBulls		42	62	104	Advance to the Last Chance
3	D'Xavier	2	41	59	100	Advance to the Last Chance
4	Nigma Galaxy	1	34	66	100	Advance to the Last Chance
5	RUKH eSports	0	38	49	87	Advance to the Last Chance
6	Bigetron Red Villains	1	28	58	86	Advance to the Last Chance
7	IHC Esports	1	17	61	78	Advance to the Last Chance
8	iNCO Gaming	2	28	48	76	Advance to the Last Chance
9	Team Queso	1	24	52	76	Advance to the Last Chance
10	Brute Force	2	33	37	70	Advance to the Last Chance
11	FaZe Clan	2	28	41	69	Advance to the Last Chance
12	Yoodo Alliance	1	23	45	68	Advance to the Last Chance
13	Reject	0	30	38	68	Advance to the Last Chance
14	Gaimin Gladiators	0	14	48	62	Advance to the Last Chance
15	Persija EVOS	1	24	36	60	Advance to the Last Chance
16	Duksan Esports	0	19	40	59	Advance to the Last Chance
17	SEM9	0	19	36	55	Eliminated
18	Dplus KIA	0	17	38	55	Eliminated
19	NASR Esports	0	6	44	50	Eliminated
20	NB Esports	1	21	28	49	Eliminated
21	Melise Esports	1	14	32	46	Eliminated
22	Alter Ego Ares	1	14	28	42	Eliminated
23	N Hyper Esports	0	16	27	43	Eliminated
24	Quest Esports	0	6	19	25	Eliminated

=== Last Chance standings ===
Rank	Team	WWCD	Placement	Elims	Total points	Qualification
1	D'Xavier	4	55	53	108	Qualified for the Grand Finals
2	Persija EVOS	0	29	63	92	Qualified for the Grand Finals
3	FaZe Clan	0	27	60	87	Qualified for the Grand Finals
4	IHC Esports	1	22	63	85	Qualified for the Grand Finals
5	Yoodo Alliance	0	30	52	82	Qualified for the Grand Finals
6	Team Queso	0	22	55	77	Eliminated
7	Bigetron Red Villains	0	34	39	73	Eliminated
8	iNCO Gaming	1	28	45	73	Eliminated
9	Influence Rage	1	25	40	65	Eliminated
10	Duksan Esports	1	19	45	64	Eliminated
11	Reject	0	25	36	61	Eliminated
12	RUKH eSports	1	21	35	56	Eliminated
13	Nigma Galaxy	1	19	31	50	Eliminated
14	Brute Force	0	12	31	43	Eliminated
15	MadBulls	0	11	31	42	Eliminated
16	Gaimin Gladiators	0	5	21	26	Eliminated

== Grand Finals ==
=== Grand Finals standings ===
Rank	Team	WWCD	Placement	Elims	Total points
1	IHC Esports	1	32	110	142
2	Stalwart Esports	3	55	83	138
3	Alpha7 Esports	2	54	77	131
4	4Merical Vibes	2	43	84	127
5	D'Xavier	2	48	76	124
6	FaZe Clan	1	42	78	120
7	Nongshim RedForce	2	38	74	112
8	Weibo Gaming	1	44	66	110
9	Titan Esports Club	0	25	77	102
10	Six Two Eight	2	32	68	100
11	S2G Esports	1	42	56	98
12	Loops Esports	0	27	50	77
13	Persija EVOS	1	29	45	74
14	Major Pride	0	21	50	71
15	Yoodo Alliance	0	30	39	69
16	Morph GPX	0	14	34	48

== Final standings ==
the 2023 PUBG Mobile Global Championship's US$3,000,000 prize pool is divided into separate categories. Each team will earn prizemoney based on how well they did in the Group Stage, Survival Stage, Last Chance and Grand Finals.

Final standings and prizepool of US$3,000,000 distribution are as seen as below:

Final Placement	Team name	Total Prize Pool
Champion	(Mongolia) IHC Esports	$453,500
Runner-up	(Mongolia) Stalwart Esports	$263,000
3rd	(Brazil) Alpha7 Esports	$184,000
4th	(Mongolia) 4Merical Vibes	$144,000
5th	(Vietnam) D'Xavier	$121,000
6th	(Thailand) FaZe Clan	$105,000
7th	(South Korea) Nongshim RedForce	$107,000
8th	(China) Weibo Gaming	$98,000
9th	(China) Titan Esports Club	$47,500
10th	(China) Six Two Eight	$94,000
11th	(Turkey) S2G Esports	$42,500
12th	(Brazil) Loops Esports	$90,000
13th	(Indonesia) Persija EVOS	$78,000
14th	(Commonwealth of Independent States) Major Pride	$85,000
15th	(Malaysia) Yoodo Alliance	$71,250
16th	(Indonesia) Morph GPX	$78,000
17th	(Chile) Team Queso	$38,500
18th	(Indonesia) Bigetron Red Villains	$40,250
19th	(Brazil) iNCO Gaming	$35,750
20th	(Brazil) Influence Rage	$39,500
21st	(South Korea) Duksan Esports	$35,750
22nd	(Japan) Reject	$36,500
23rd	(Commonwealth of Independent States) RUKH eSports	$35,500
24th	(Iraq) Nigma Galaxy	$37,750
25th	(Bahrain) Brute Force	$33,750
26th	(Commonwealth of Independent States) MadBulls	$36,250
27th	(Russia) Gaimin Gladiators	$30,750
28th	(Malaysia) SEM9	$28,500
29th	(South Korea) Dplus KIA	$31,000
30th	(United Arab Emirates) NASR Esports	$28,000
31st	(Mongolia) NB Esports	$28,000
32nd	(Turkey) Melise Esports	$27,500
33rd	(Indonesia) Alter Ego Ares	$27,500
34th	(China) N Hyper Esports	$27,500
35th	(Saudi Arabia) Quest Esports	$25,000
36th - 38th	(China) Tianba	$22,000
36th - 38th	(Brazil) Intense Game	$22,000
36th - 38th	(Thailand) Vampire Esports	$22,000
39th - 41st	(Kazakhstan) Falcons White	$21,500
39th - 41st	(Turkey) Next Rüya	$21,500
39th - 41st	(Russia) De Muerte	$21,500
42nd - 44th	(Turkey) BRA Esports	$21,000
42nd - 44th	(Pakistan) Seventh Element	$21,000
42nd - 44th	(Myanmar) Genesis Esports	$21,000
45th - 47th	(Pakistan) Agonxi8 Esports	$20,500
45th - 47th	(Thailand) HAIL Esports	$20,500
45th - 47th	(Nepal) DRS Gaming	$20,500
48th - 50th	(Thailand) Xerxia Esports	$20,000
48th - 50th	(Kazakhstan) Konina Power	$20,000
48th - 50th	(Japan) BEENOSTORM	$20,000

=== Base Prize Distribution ===
==== League Stage ====
The League Stage has a total prize pool of $1,580,000 USD, and is distributed as follows:

Participation Reward
$10,000 (for each team)

Group Stage (per group)
Place	Prize (in USD)	Place	Prize (in USD)
1st	$40,000	9th	$13,500
2nd	$39,000	10th	$13,000
3rd	$38,000	11th	$12,500
4th	$16,000	12th	$12,000
5th	$15,500	13th	$11,500
6th	$15,000	14th	$11,000
7th	$14,500	15th	$10,500
8th	$14,000	16th	$10,000

Survival Stage
Place	Prize (in USD)	Place	Prize (in USD)	Place	Prize (in USD)
1st	$10,000	9th	$8,000	17th	$6,000
2nd	$9,750	10th	$7,750	18th	$5,500
3rd	$9,500	11th	$7,500	19th	$5,000
4th	$9,250	12th	$7,250	20th	$4,500
5th	$9,000	13th	$7,000	21st	$4,000
6th	$8,750	14th	$6,750	22nd	$3,500
7th	$8,500	15th	$6,500	23rd	$3,000
8th	$8,250	16th	$6,250	24th	$2,500

Last Chance
Place	Prize (in USD)	Place	Prize (in USD)
1st	$10,000	9th	$4,500
2nd	$8,500	10th	$4,000
3rd	$7,500	11th	$3,500
4th	$7,000	12th	$3,000
5th	$6,500	13th	$2,500
6th	$6,000	14th	$2,000
7th	$5,500	15th	$1,500
8th	$5,000	16th	$1,000

==== Grand Finals ====
The Grand Finals has a total prize pool of $1,420,000 USD, and is distributed as follows:

Participation Reward
$15,000 (for each team)

Grand Finals
Place	Prize (in USD)	Place	Prize (in USD)
1st	$400,000	9th	$32,500
2nd	$200,000	10th	$30,000
3rd	$120,000	11th	$27,500
4th	$80,000	12th	$25,000
5th	$62,000	13th	$22,500
6th	$51,000	14th	$20,000
7th	$42,000	15th	$17,500
8th	$35,000	16th	$15,000

=== Awards ===
Award name	Participant
MVP	(Mongolia) Zyol (IHC)
Gunslinger	(Mongolia) Zyol (IHC)
Grenade Master	(Thailand) MELA (FaZe)
Field Medic	(Vietnam) ParaJin (DX)
