= Malhar Kalambe =

Indian Environmentalist

Malhar Kaalambe
- Born: Mumbai, Maharashtra, India
- Education: K. P. B. Hinduja College of Commerce (CA)
- Occupations: Environmentalist; social media influencer
- Years active: 2017–present
- Organization: Beach Please
- Awards: National Creators Award (2024)

Malhar Kaalambe (formerly known as Malhar Kalambe) is an Indian environmentalist, social media influencer from Mumbai, Maharashtra. He is the founder of the non-profit organization Beach Please India, which has cleaned and disposed of over 8.3 million kilograms of garbage since 2017.

In 2022, he was featured in India's Top 100 Digital Stars by Forbes magazine.

== Career ==
Kaalambe's activism was sparked in 2017 during a trip to Bali, Indonesia, where he contrasted the pristine beaches abroad with Mumbai's polluted shores upon his return. Frustrated by post-festival litter, particularly single-use plastics, he launched "Beach Please" on 10 September 2017 as a weekly clean-up initiative starting at Dadar Beach.

Beach Please has removed over 8.5 million kilograms of waste from Mumbai’s beaches over 371 weeks. Events like school reunions have drawn 4.5 lakh participants, fostering a network of young activists.

== Recognition and awards ==
- 2019: United Nations Volunteers India V-Award for "Volunteer for Change."
- 2022: Ranked 28th in Forbes India's Top 100 Digital Stars for leveraging social media in conservation.
- 2024: National Creators Award from the Government of India for "Sustainable Creator of the Year," presented by Prime Minister Narendra Modi.
- 2024: Featured in Forbes India's Digital Stars list (Rank 92) as a changemaker, with a Goat Score of 6.69 for engagement.
- 2025: Ambassador for Swachh Bharat Abhiyan; speaker at Viksit Bharat Young Leaders Dialogue on sustainability.
