= Milan Mela =

Milan Mela Prangan (previously rebranded as Biswa Bangla Mela Prangan) is the primary exhibition and convention centre for Kolkata, India. With 31,894 square metres (343,300 ft^{2}) of exhibition space.

The complex is owned and managed by the West Bengal Trade Promotion Organisation (WBTPO), Government of West Bengal. The WBTPO is an initiative by the state's Commerce & Industries department with the prime objective to promote trade, commerce and business opportunities for West Bengal. The idea was then germinated by West Bengal Industrial Development Corporation (WBIDC) and Kolkata Municipal Corporation (KMC) and they jointly formed the WBTPO.

== Overview ==
Milan Mela was built in 2008 with the purpose of providing a trade fair complex to promote trade and industry, art and culture and other services in the State of West Bengal. WBTPO also planned to organize national and international trade fairs, exhibitions and conferences and other events for promotion of art and culture, other services, recreation, and to construct/set up, maintain and operate exhibition complexes in West Bengal for holding local, national and international exhibitions in such complexes or elsewhere in the state for promotion of trade and industry. The government also hoped to promote the trade fair complex developed in the complex along with other allied facilities in India and overseas to invite participation for holding events ranging from small meetings to large fairs. The complex was also designed to display items ranging from handicrafts to heavy machinery, printing and printing machinery, auto shows.
