= National Creators Award =

Indian government awards for digital content

- Awarded for: Excellence in Digital Content Creation
- Sponsored by: Government of India
- Date: March 8, 2024
- Location: Bharat Mandapam, New Delhi
- Country: India
- Presented by: Prime Minister of India
- Eligibility: Digital Content Creators
- Hosted by: Ministry of Electronics & Information Technology, Government of India
- First award: 2024

The National Creators Award is an Indian award established in 2024 to honour excellence and positive influence in digital content creation. It is presented by the Prime Minister of India and recognises leading creators across various online platforms.

== Eligibility ==
The National Creators Award has specific criteria that creators must meet to be eligible for nomination. Here's a breakdown of the key points:

- Age: Participants must be 18 years of age or older at the time of nomination.
- Nationality:
  - Indian Creators: 19 categories are reserved exclusively for individuals with Indian nationality.
  - International Creators: One dedicated category recognizes outstanding creators from outside India.
- Content Platform: Content must be published on one or more of the following digital platforms:
  - Instagram
  - YouTube
  - Twitter
  - LinkedIn
  - Facebook
- Language: Content submissions can be in Hindi/English or any other Indian language.
- Nomination:
  - Self-Nomination: Creators can nominate themselves in a maximum of three relevant categories.
  - Nominating Others: Individuals can nominate others for any category.

== Selection ==
A jury of experts assesses the remaining nominees based on predefined criteria:

- Creativity: Originality and uniqueness of the content.
- Impact: Positive influence and social change driven by the content.
- Reach: Engagement and audience base of the creator.
- Innovation: Fresh approaches and implementation within the content domain.
- Sustainability: Long-term potential and viability of the creator's work.
- Alignment with Goals: How well the content aligns with the National Creators Award's vision of positive social impact

Based on the jury's evaluation, the final decision on awarding winners in each category is made. While the specific details of jury composition and evaluation methods might not be publicly available, the award strives for transparency by:

- Having a well-defined set of evaluation criteria.
- Encouraging public participation through open nominations.

== Award Ceremony ==
The inaugural ceremony of the National Creators Award was held on March 8, 2024, coinciding with the auspicious occasion of Mahashivratri. The ceremony marked a significant moment in recognizing the growing influence of digital content creators in India. Bharat Mandapam in New Delhi served as the backdrop for this grand event.

The Award is presented by the Prime Minister in presence of Minister of Electronics & IT & Jury members.

== Winners ==
Winners NCA-2024
Category	Winner	Platform
Best Travel Creator	Kamiya Jani	YouTube
Best Gaming Creator	Nischay Malhan	YouTube
Best Health & Fitness Creator	Ankit Baiyanpuria	YouTube & Instagram
Best Education Creator	Naman Deshmukh	YouTube, IG & Facebook
Best Food Creator	Kabita Singh	YouTube, IG & Facebook
Most Creative Creator (Male)	RJ Raunac	YouTube, IG & Facebook
Most Creative Creator (Female)	Shraddha Jain	YouTube, IG & Facebook
Best Tech Creator	Gaurav Chaudhary (Technical Guruji)	YouTube, IG & Facebook
Best International Creator	Drew Hicks	YouTube, IG & Facebook
Best Creator for Social Change	Jaya Kishori	YouTube, IG & Facebook
Cultural Ambassador of the Year	Maithili Thakur	YouTube, IG & Facebook
Favourite Green Champion	Pankti Pandey	YouTube, IG & Facebook
Best Fashion and Lifestyle Creator	Mohit Kumar	
Best Micro Creator	Aridaman	
Best Nano Creator	Piyush Purohit	YouTube, IG & Facebook
Most Impactful Agri Creator	Lakshay Dabas	YouTube, IG & Facebook
Disruptor of the Year	Ranveer Allahabadia	YouTube, IG & Facebook
Celebrity Creator	Aman Gupta	YouTube, IG & Facebook
Swacchata Ambassador Award	Malhar Kalambe	YouTube, IG & Facebook
Heritage Fashion Icon Award	Jahnvi Singh	
New India Champion	Abhi and Niyu	
Best Storyteller	Keerthika Govindhasamy	
