= Mortal (gamer) =

Indian YouTuber and esports player (born 1997)

MortaL
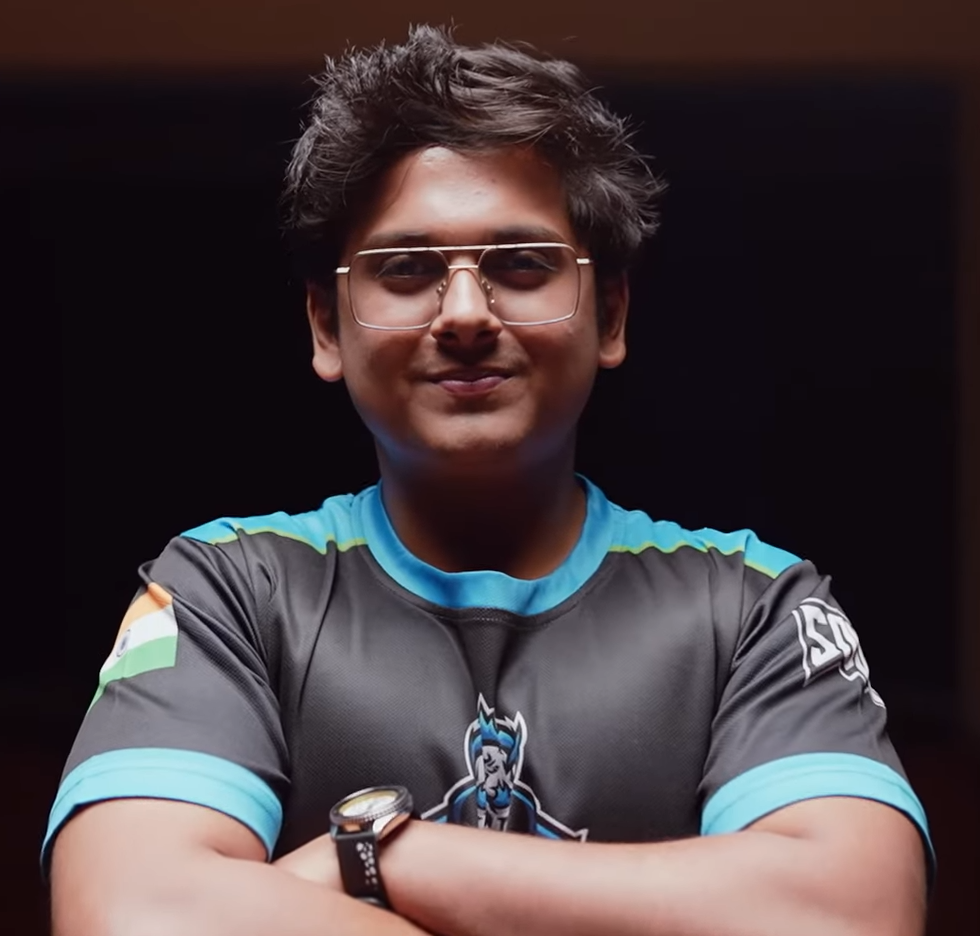

Personal information
- Name: Naman Mathur
- Born: 22 May 1997 (age 29); Mumbai, India

Career information
- Games: Battlegrounds Mobile India; PUBG Mobile
- Playing career: 2018–2023

Team history
- 2018–2023: Team SouL

Career highlights and awards
- 2019: Winner of PUBG Mobile India Series; 2019: Winner of PMCO India Regionals; 2022: Winner of Battlegrounds Mobile India Pro Series

YouTube information
- Channel: MortaL
- Years active: 2013–present
- Genre: Gaming
- Subscribers: 6.98 million
- Views: 1.40 billion
- Last updated: 27 October 2025

Naman Mathur (born 22 May 1997), known professionally as Mortal, is an Indian YouTuber, gamer, online streamer, and former esports athlete. He is best known for live streaming PlayerUnknown's Battlegrounds Mobile and Battlegrounds Mobile India.

== Personal life ==
Naman Mathur was born on 22 May 1997 in Mumbai, India.

== Career ==
Mathur began his gaming journey in 2016 when he launched his YouTube channel, where he posted videos of himself playing Mini Militia. However, it wasn't until 2018 when he started playing PUBG Mobile that he gained substantial traction and popularity.

He founded team Soul and S8UL with 8bit Thug(Animesh Agarwal) and S8UL Goldy (Lokesh Jain).

In 2019, he won the PUBG Mobile India Series playing for Team SouL. Continuing the winning streak, he won the PUBG Mobile Club Open - Spring Split: India in New Delhi, qualifying for PUBG Mobile Club Open - Spring Split Global Finals in Berlin, Germany, where his team finished 12th. In 2019, he won the Esports Mobile Player of the Year award at the Indian Gaming Awards, which further cemented his status as one of India's most prominent gaming personalities. He continued his esports career in BGMI after the ban of PUBG Mobile in India. In 2022, he won the Battlegrounds Mobile India Pro Series, playing for Team SouL.

He has expressed his support for the growth of esports in India and has been a vocal advocate for its recognition as a legitimate form of sports in the country. Mortal is co-owner of the gaming content creation organisation S8UL Esports, which is group of online gaming content creators and esport athletes. S8UL has won the Content Creator of the Year award at the Esports Awards thrice in the year 2022,2023 and 2024.

Mortal was nominated for the Esports Personality of the Year award at the Esports Awards consecutively for two times in 2022 and 2023. He had also won the second place twice for Streamer of the Year for the years 2020 and 2021. In 2023, Mortal partnered with MG Motor India to design the Gamer Edition of their car, Comet EV. In April 2024, Mortal, along with other Indian gamers, met Indian Prime Minister Narendra Modi to talk about the future of the Indian gaming industry.

== Filmography ==
=== Web ===
Year	Title	Role	Notes	Ref.
2022–present	Playground	Himself	Mentor	
2019	Dosti Ka Naya Maidan	Himself (cameo)	TVF	Episode 02
