= Stalwart Esports =

Indian professional esports organisation

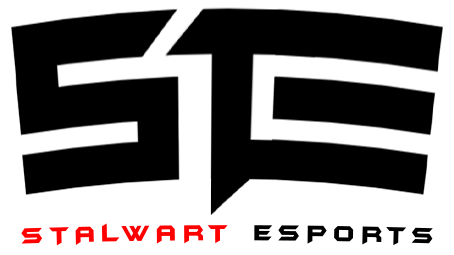
- Short name: STE
- Founded: January 2020
- Location: India; Mongolia
- Owner: Zeyan Shafiq
- CEO: Zeyan Shafiq
- Divisions: PUBG Mobile; Clash Royale; Free Fire; CODM; Brawl Stars
- Motto: Curating Professional Gamers
- Website: stalwartesports.com

Stalwart Esports is an Indian professional esports organisation focused on mobile gaming. It was founded in January 2020. Stalwart Esports has teams competing in PUBG Mobile, Free Fire, Clash Royale, Brawl Stars and Call of Duty: Mobile.They became the first esports organisation to adopt cryptocurrencies in their balance sheet.

In September 2020, the team donated their slot of the PUBG Mobile Pro League (PMPL) South Asia to Pakistani Esports organisation Freestyle Esports after PUBG Mobile was banned in India.

In December 2021, Stalwart Esports became the only team from South Asia to qualify for PUBG Mobile Global Championship (PMGC) 2021 Grand Finals.

In May 2022, Stalwart Esports won the PMPL South Asia Championship S2.

== PUBG Mobile ==
In August 2020, Stalwart Esports' PUBG Mobile division made their first appearance in PUBG Mobile Club Open (PMCO) Fall Split 2020 and claimed 3rd position, advancing to Season 2 of PUBG Mobile Pro League (PMPL) South Asia. However, in the wake of recent India-China disputes, PUBG Mobile was banned in India from 2 September. Reluctant to give up their slot, they signed a Pakistani line-up called FreeStyle Esports to represent them in the Pro League. FreeStyle Esports have been champions of the Pakistan PMCO 2020 and were part of the World League last season.

In December 2020, Stalwart Esports cross border collaboration with FreeStyle Esports continued and resulted in the formation of a new organisation called Stalwart Freestyle in Pakistan.

In February 2021, Stalwart Esports announced their second partnership in Pakistan with another Pakistani esports organisation 'Flex Esports' and formed a new entity Stalwart Flex in the region for the PMCO Pakistan 2021 Spring Split tournament.

In September 2021, Stalwart Esports revealed that it had acquired a Mongolian roster that won the PUBG Mobile Pro League (PMPL) South Asia Championship the previous June, which had a huge prize pool of $200,000. Stalwart Esports stated that the acquisition of this team has made them the highest-paid PUBG Mobile Esports athletes in the entire South Asian region.

In December 2021, Stalwart Esports secured a berth in the Grand Finals of the PUBG Mobile Global Championship 2021 (PMGC), a prestigious event that took place in Singapore and boasted a substantial prize pool of 6 million USD. PMGC 2021 represented the pinnacle of PUBG Mobile Esports, being the largest event in its history. It is the annual S Tier Event IP in the world of PUBG Mobile Esports. Stalwart Esports secured the position of 2nd runners-up in the PMGC League Stage. In December 2023, They managed to secure 2nd place in the PMGC 2023 Grand Finals.

=== Roster ===
Stalwart Esports PUBG Mobile roster
Players
Coaches

Handle	Name	Nationality
Crita	Erdene, Bat	Mongolia
Fearless Pubgm	Battumur	Mongolia
Sanchir	Galbadrakh, Sanchirbold	Mongolia
Skryyy	Bilguutei, Bayasgalan	Mongolia
Riley	Khangerel

Head coach

Skryy

Legend:
- (I) Inactive
- (S) Suspended
- Substitute
- (injured) Injury / Illness

Latest roster transaction: February 17, 2023.

== Free Fire ==
On 1 October 2020, Stalwart Esports introduced their Free Fire Competitive line-up, participating in the Free Fire India Championship 2020 (FFIC). Stalwart finished in 2nd position during the league stages, and finished 3rd in the final, behind Total Gaming Esports and Esports Elite.

== Call Of Duty Mobile ==
On 1 January 2024, Stalwart Esports introduced their Call Of Duty Mobile Competitive line-up, participating in the Garena Region. Stalwart Esports Finished As runners up in the both Garena Masters Regional Tournaments and ended up at the 5th position in the CODM World Championship
