= Battlegrounds Mobile India =

Version of PUBG Mobile for players in India

- App icon
- Developer: Krafton
- Publisher: Krafton
- Director: Sean Hyunil Sohn
- Composers: Tom Salta; Hemanth Jois
- Series: PUBG Universe
- Engine: Unreal Engine 4
- Platforms: Android; iOS; iPadOS
- Release: Android; 2 July 2021; 5 years ago iOS/iPadOS; 18 August 2021; 5 years ago
- Genre: Battle royale
- Mode: Multiplayer

Battlegrounds Mobile India (BGMI), previously known as PUBG Mobile India, is a version of PUBG Mobile, available in India. It is an online multiplayer battle royale game by Krafton. The game was initially released on 2 July 2021 for Android devices, and on 18 August 2021 for iOS devices. There are two official tournaments in a calendar year in BGMI, held by Krafton India Esports. The first is Battlegrounds Mobile India Series (BGIS) and the later one is BGMI Pro Series (BMPS).

As of July 2022, BGMI surpassed 290 million downloads on the Google Play Store. The game was banned in India on 28 July 2022, by the Indian government. According to a statement from Krafton, the ban was removed on 26 May 2023.

== Gameplay ==
Battlegrounds Mobile India is a battle royale game, in which up to 100 players compete in a large-scale last man standing deathmatch. Players can enter the match as individuals or as small group of friends up to four.

Each match starts with players parachuting from a plane onto one of the several maps. Each round, the plane's flight path across the map changes, requiring players to quickly determine the best time to eject and parachute to the ground. Players begin with no equipment other than customised clothing options that have no effect on gameplay. Once on the ground, players can search buildings, ghost towns, and other locations for weapons, vehicles, armour, and other items. At the start of a match, these items are procedurally distributed throughout the map, with higher-risk zones typically having better equipment. Finished players can also be looted for their gear. Players can choose to play in first-person or third-person, with each having advantages and disadvantages in combat and situational awareness.

Every few minutes, the map's playable area shrinks towards a random location, with any player caught outside the safe zone taking incremental damage and eventually being eliminated if the safe zone is not entered in time; in game, the boundary appears as a shimmering blue wall that contracts over time. This results in a more constrained map, which increases the likelihood of encounters. Random regions of the map are highlighted in red and bombed during the match, posing a threat to players who remain in that area. Players are warned a few minutes before these events in both cases, giving them time to relocate to safety. A plane will occasionally fly over different parts of the playable map at random, or wherever a player uses a flare gun, and drop a loot package containing items that are normally unobtainable during normal gameplay. These packages emit highly visible red or yellow smoke, attracting interested players and resulting in additional confrontations. A full round takes about 30 minutes.

== Development ==
On 2 September 2020, the Ministry of Electronics and Information Technology of the Government of India banned PUBG Mobile, along with 117 Chinese applications, citing activities that were prejudicial and a threat to India's sovereignty, integrity, defence, state security, and public order under Section 69A of the Information Technology Act, 2000.

It was reported in November 2020 that PUBG Mobile would be relaunched in India under the name PUBG Mobile India. On 24 November 2020, The Times of India reported that PUBG Studios and South Korea's video game company Krafton had registered PUBG India Private Limited under the Ministry of Corporate Affairs, Government of India in order to relaunch PUBG Mobile in India.

It was reported in May 2021 that PUBG Mobile would be rebranded as Battlegrounds Mobile India in order to enter the Indian gaming market. Following that, The Indian Express reported on 7 May 2021 that Krafton confirmed in a press statement that they were going to launch Battlegrounds Mobile India, a game similar to PUBG Mobile.

== Release ==
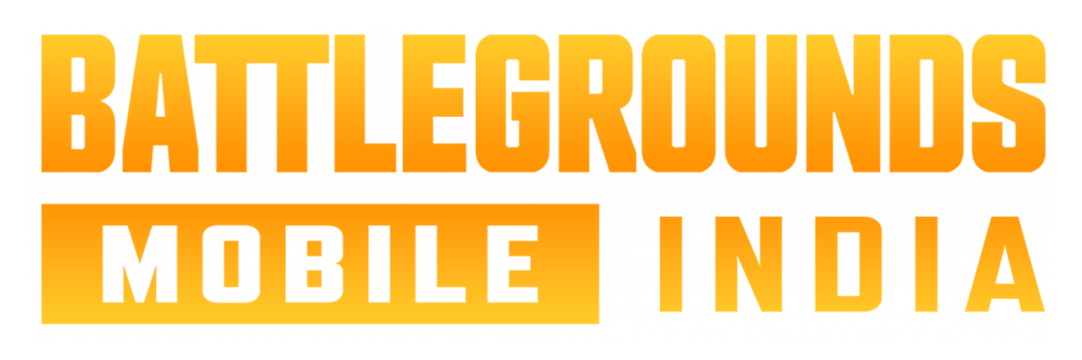
Logo

The game was announced on 6 May 2021. The pre-registrations of the game started for Android users on 18 May 2021 and early access beta version of the game was released on 17 June 2021 only for Android users. The game released on 2 July 2021 for Android devices, and on 18 August 2021 for iOS devices.

Battlegrounds Mobile India has announced a new A4 Royale Pass with exclusive rewards, available until 4 March 2024. This pass offers two options – Standard Royale Pass and Exclusive Elite Royale Pass, providing players with numerous awards and benefits. This Royale Pass will be live from 15 January 2024 to 4 March 2024.

On 21 November 2024, update 3.5 introduced much awaited features in the game like 120 fps for both Android and iOS users.

== Esports ==
=== BGMI Launch Party ===
After Krafton launched BGMI in India, they hosted BGMI Launch Party, the first BGMI esports tournament, to celebrate the game's official release. The tournament took place from 8 July 2021 to 9 July 2021. It was exclusive to the most popular Indian gamers, such as Adii "Dynamo" Sawant and Chetan "Kronten" Chandgude, who were divided into 18 teams of four players each. The event was live-streamed on BGMI's official Facebook and YouTube pages and reached a peak concurrent viewership of 547,888, making it a success.

On both days, the teams played three matches on the game's maps Erangel, Miramar, and Vikendi, in that order. On the first day, Team Snax won all three matches, taking the lead with 76 points. On the second day, Team Snax won the first match, but Team Jonathan and Team Maxtern won the second and third matches, respectively.

Team Snax, consisting of players Raj "Snax" Varma, Samir "Kratos" Choubey, Randeep "Attanki" Bhallar, and Daljit "Daljit SK" Singh, finished in first place with a total of 127 points and received ₹3.3 lakh (US$3,500) from the ₹6 lakh (US$6,400) prize pool. Team Kronten was the runner-up with a total of 63 points.

=== Battlegrounds Mobile India Series (BGIS) ===
Following the success of the Launch Party, Krafton announced its first Battlegrounds Mobile India Series (BGIS) esports tournament. The tournament was supposed to start in July 2021, but it was delayed due to increasing hackers. The India Series was open to all Indian residents aged 16 or older who had reached Platinum rank or higher. At the time, BGMI was available only on Android devices.

The tournament had a total prize pool of ₹1 crore (US$110,000), which was to be distributed among the top 16 teams, with the first-place team receiving ₹50 lakh (US$53,000). Additional awards were offered to the team with the most kills and to individual players for outstanding performances. These individual awards included MVP, The Lone Ranger (longest survival time), The Rampage Freak (most kills), and The Redeemer (most revivals). The tournament emphasized strategic and tactical play, reflecting how players understand the mechanics of the game.

The series had five stages: In-Game Qualifiers, Online Qualifiers (consisting of three rounds), Quarter-Finals, Semi-Finals, and Grand Finale. A Losers' Bracket was also provided for teams that failed to advance beyond the Quarter-Finals, giving them another chance to qualify for the Semi-Finals. In each stage, except the In-Game Qualifiers, the remaining teams were divided into groups, with the top-performing teams in each group advancing to the next round. The tournament was scheduled to span three months, beginning with the qualifying events.

BGIS 2026 is Krafton’s flagship Battlegrounds Mobile India esports tournament for the 2026 season, featuring a total prize pool of ₹2 crore (approximately US$230,000). The tournament follows a multi-stage format consisting of In-Game Qualifiers, The Grind (invited teams), multiple online elimination rounds, a Wildcard Stage, a Survival Stage, and a LAN Grand Finale held in Chennai from 27 to 29 March 2026. The prize pool is distributed among the top 16 teams, with the winning team receiving ₹60 lakh (approximately US$69,000), along with additional individual awards such as Tournament MVP, Grand Finals MVP, Best IGL, and Emerging Star. The competition runs from January to March 2026 and serves as a primary qualification pathway to Tier-1 BGMI tournaments such as BMPS, BMSD, and others.

=== BGMI Pro Series (BMPS) ===
Krafton India announced the first season of Battlegrounds Mobile India Pro Series in 2022, with a prize pool of ₹2 crore ($256,000) and a total of 24 teams competing for a share of the prize money. This was the first ever Pro Series for BGMI in India.

The Pro Series is an invite-only tournament and Krafton India holds the exclusive rights to issue invitations. Professional teams across India that have demonstrated potential, dominance, consistency, and outstanding performance are given the opportunity to compete in the Pro Series.

BGMI Pro Series has completed four seasons, with a different team winning each championship. The tournament features multi-crore prize pools and is a major event in India's BGMI esports calendar. In the 2026 Season, the tournament champion will automatically qualify for the PUBG Mobile Esports World Cup to compete internationally.

=== BGMI Showdown (BMSD) ===
Krafton India announced Battlegrounds Mobile India Showdown 2022 (BMSD 2022) after successfully concluding BMPS 2022. The event is known for being the first-ever offline LAN tournament for the battle royale game. BMSD is also an invitation-only event where top teams from across India come under a single roof to compete and be the best in India.

After 2022, BMSD returned in 2025. Krafton India announced Battlegrounds Mobile India Showdown (BMSD) 2025, which was held in Hyderabad as a LAN event with a prize pool of ₹1 crore. The top eight teams in BMSD qualified for the BGMI International Cup. The winning team Orangutan secured ₹30 lakh and a direct spot in the Global Championships.

At the finale of the BGMI International Cup (BMIC) 2025 in New Delhi, Krafton CEO announced the Krafton India Esports Roadmap, which includes expanded editions of Krafton's flagship esports IPs. As part of the roadmap, the BGMI Showdown is also scheduled to take place in September 2026.

=== BGMI International Cup (BMIC) ===
In 2023, Krafton India announced the BGMI India–Korea Invitational, a friendly match held later that year. This unique face-off between the best teams of two gaming powerhouses featured eight of South Korea's Battlegrounds esports teams competing against the top eight Indian teams from the BGIS 2023 Grand Finals. The India–Korea Invitational was a LAN event hosted at Pragati Maidan, Delhi. The tournament concluded with South Korean team Dplus KIA winning the championship after a dominant performance, while Indian team Gods Reign finished in second place.

The event returned in 2025 under the name Battlegrounds Mobile India International Cup (BMIC) 2025. The BGMI International Cup was announced with a whooping prize pool of ₹1 crore. The event featured 8 Indian teams, 4 South Korean teams and 4 Japanese teams. The three-day esports tournament has come to an end with South Korean team DRX winning the tournament, followed by Indian team True Rippers as the runners-up. Besides the prize money, both the teams secured their slot at PUBG Mobile Global Championship (PMGC) 2025.

== Controversies ==
On 21 June 2021, following the early beta release for Android users, IGN India first reported that data from users' Android devices was being sent to Tencent-owned servers in China. "One reason for this could be because Krafton is allowing BGMI players to transfer their account and game data from PUBG Mobile to BGMI until December 2021," according to The Times of India. Following this data sharing violation, Krafton, the developer of BGMI, issued a brief in-game update on 22 June 2021 to resolve the data sharing issue with China-based servers. However, it has been reported that if a user deletes the application data, the game may ping Chinese servers.

=== Ban in India ===
On 28 July 2022, the game was removed for data privacy reasons from Google Play and App Store following a government order, but the game was working without any VPN.

On 19 May 2023, Krafton released a notice saying that BGMI is getting relaunched for a trial period after a 10-month long dispute.

The game was made available to download on 27 May for Android users and 29 May for iOS users. However, on both the platforms, it was playable only after 29 May.
