= PUBG (franchise) =

Video game franchise

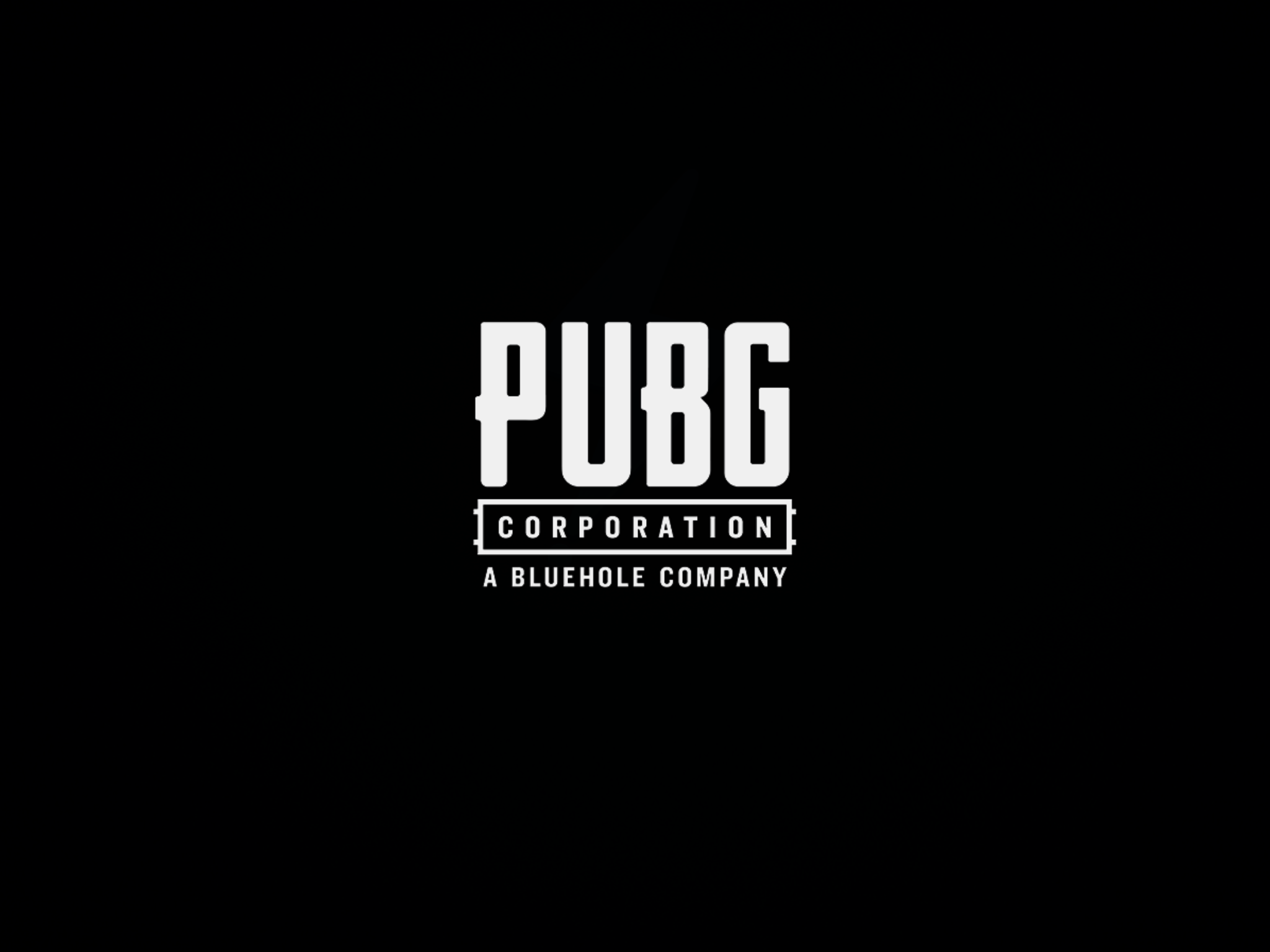
- Wordmark
- Genre: Battle royale
- Developers: PUBG Studios; LightSpeed Studios
- Publishers: Krafton; Tencent Games
- Creator: Brendan Greene
- Platforms: Android; iOS; Microsoft Windows; PlayStation 4; PlayStation 5; Xbox One; Xbox Series X and Series S
- First release: PUBG: Battlegrounds; 20 December 2017
- Spin-offs: PUBG Mobile; Battlegrounds Mobile India; New State Mobile

PUBG is a video game franchise owned by the South Korean video game company Krafton. It began with PUBG: Battlegrounds, a 2017 battle royale game developed under the creative direction of Brendan Greene, whose online handle "PlayerUnknown" formed part of the game's original title. The franchise includes the original PC and console title, mobile adaptations, a regional version for India, esports competitions, and story-based media released under the "PUBG Universe" label.

The original game became a major commercial success during early access. By September 2017, PlayerUnknown's Battlegrounds had sold more than ten million copies on Steam after entering early access in March that year. PUBG Mobile, released in 2018, became one of the franchise's largest products, passing one billion accumulated downloads outside China by 2021. Krafton has continued to position PUBG as a long-term intellectual property, with later plans to expand it through additional games, live-service updates, user-generated content, and related media.

== Background ==
PUBG: Battlegrounds developed from Greene's earlier battle royale modifications for existing games. Greene had previously worked on battle royale modes and mods for games including Arma 2, Arma 3, and H1Z1, before joining Bluehole to develop a standalone commercial version of the format. The game entered early access for Windows in March 2017 and received its full Windows release in December 2017.

The title was initially released as PlayerUnknown's Battlegrounds. In 2021, the game was renamed PUBG: Battlegrounds, a branding change that formalised the already common use of the shortened PUBG name. The rebranding accompanied Krafton's wider effort to use PUBG as a franchise label for connected games and media rather than only the original battle royale title.

== Franchise development and branding ==
PUBG grew from a single multiplayer video game into a franchise after the commercial success of PUBG: Battlegrounds. The original game sold more than ten million copies on Steam within several months of its early access launch, and its early growth led to mobile adaptations, regional versions, esports competitions, and related media projects.

Krafton has continued to describe PUBG as one of its central franchise properties. In 2021, Krafton's planned initial public offering was valued in connection with the success of PUBG, with the company seeking to raise up to 5.6 trillion won at the top of its indicative range. The company's later market performance was also tied to expectations for PUBG and its mobile-related revenue streams, particularly in Asia.

In 2025 and 2026, Krafton outlined plans to expand PUBG beyond its existing battle royale format. The company's roadmap included an upgrade path for PUBG: Battlegrounds, a user-generated content project, and further live-service development. In 2026, the company said it would accelerate growth of the PUBG intellectual property while developing other potential franchise properties. Industry coverage of the strategy described the planned expansion as a move toward broader player-created modes and platform-style experiences, with the company discussing a future version of PUBG that would not be limited to traditional battle royale gameplay.

== Games ==
Release timeline
| 2017 | PUBG: Battlegrounds |
| 2018 | PUBG Mobile |
2019–2020
| 2021 | Battlegrounds Mobile India |
| 2021 | New State Mobile |
2022–2025
| 2026 | PUBG: Blindspot |
| TBA | PUBG: Black Budget |
| TBA | PUBG: DED.NET |

=== PUBG: Battlegrounds (2017) ===
PUBG: Battlegrounds is the first game in the franchise. It was released for Windows through Steam early access in March 2017 and received its full Windows release on 20 December 2017. The game was later released for Xbox One, PlayStation 4, Stadia, Xbox Series X and Series S, and PlayStation 5.

The game is a multiplayer battle royale title in which up to one hundred players enter a map, collect equipment, and attempt to be the last surviving player or team. Its commercial success helped establish the PUBG name and led to further mobile adaptations, competitive events, and transmedia projects.

In January 2022, the PC and console versions moved to a free-to-play model. The shift formed part of the game's continued operation as a live-service title, with later updates focused on new content, anti-cheat measures, user-generated content, and longer-term technical development.

=== PUBG Mobile (2018) ===
PUBG Mobile is a mobile adaptation of PUBG: Battlegrounds for Android and iOS. It was co-developed by LightSpeed Studios and PUBG Studios and released in 2018. The game follows the same basic battle royale structure as the original title, with players competing to survive against other players in a shrinking play area.

PUBG Mobile became one of the franchise's largest commercial branches. By March 2021, it had surpassed one billion accumulated downloads outside China. Market estimates later placed lifetime player spending for PUBG Mobile at more than US$8 billion across the App Store and Google Play.

=== Battlegrounds Mobile India (2021) ===
Battlegrounds Mobile India, also known as BGMI, is a regional version of PUBG Mobile for the Indian market. It was launched after India banned PUBG Mobile in 2020 as part of restrictions on China-linked mobile apps. The Android version was released in July 2021, followed by an iOS release in August 2021.

The title became a major part of Krafton's Indian gaming business. By 2025, it had more than 240 million downloads in India.

=== New State Mobile (2021) ===
New State Mobile is a mobile battle royale game developed by PUBG Studios. It was announced as a sequel to PUBG Mobile and was released globally for Android and iOS on 11 November 2021.

The game is set in a future version of the PUBG universe and was released as a free-to-play live-service title in more than 200 countries. It introduced new vehicles, equipment, and systems while retaining the franchise's battle royale structure.

=== Other projects ===
PUBG: Blindspot was a free-to-play, top-down tactical shooter spin-off developed by PUBG Studios and published by Krafton. The game entered early access on Steam in February 2026 and was shut down after less than two months.

PUBG: Black Budget is an announced extraction shooter connected to the PUBG brand. The game is planned as a first-person extraction shooter with player versus player and player versus environment elements, including a shrinking map mechanic associated with battle royale games.

== Mobile and regional expansion ==
Mobile releases became central to PUBG's franchise growth. PUBG Mobile extended the franchise from PC and console platforms to smartphone markets and became a major global mobile title. In China, Tencent ended testing for PUBG Mobile in 2019 and launched Game for Peace, a similar tactical shooting game that had received monetisation approval from Chinese regulators. Krafton later earned fees by providing technology services for Peacekeeper Elite, a title similar to PUBG Mobile distributed by Tencent in China.

India became another major regional market for the franchise. After the 2020 ban of PUBG Mobile, Krafton launched Battlegrounds Mobile India as a separate version for the country. The Indian version became a major regional product for Krafton and remained connected to the company's wider investment strategy in India, where Krafton had invested more than US$200 million by 2025.

== Related media ==
Krafton has used the "PUBG Universe" label for story-based projects associated with PUBG: Battlegrounds. In 2021, it released Mysteries Unknown: Birth of the Battlegrounds, a documentary-style film starring Jonathan Frakes, before the release of the short film Ground Zero. Ground Zero, starring Ma Dong-seok, was promoted as a short film based on the storyline of PUBG.

The franchise also expanded into webtoons and other digital comics. Three webtoon series, 100, The Retreats, and Night of Silence, were announced in 2021 as part of Krafton's expansion of the PUBG universe. The series were later released for United States readers through WEBTOON.

An animated project based on the PUBG intellectual property was announced in 2021, with producer Adi Shankar attached to create and showrun the project.

The Callisto Protocol was initially planned with a connection to the PUBG universe, but the connection was removed before release. Director Glen Schofield later said that the game had grown into its own fictional world and was no longer part of the PUBG universe.

== Esports ==
The franchise has supported professional esports competitions since the early growth of PUBG: Battlegrounds. In 2018, Krafton held the PUBG Global Invitational in Berlin, one of the first official global championship events for the game. The event featured twenty teams and separate third-person and first-person competitions, each with a prize pool of US$1 million.

PUBG esports later expanded through regional and international competitions, including the PUBG Global Championship and PUBG Nations Cup. The competitive structure formed part of the franchise's live-service ecosystem and helped maintain organised play around PUBG: Battlegrounds after its initial commercial peak.

== Commercial performance ==
=== Game sales and mobile revenue ===
The original PUBG: Battlegrounds achieved high sales during its early access period, selling more than ten million copies on Steam by September 2017. By 2021, Krafton's IPO materials and related market coverage continued to identify PUBG as the company's key commercial property.

The mobile branch became a major part of the franchise's commercial performance. PUBG Mobile surpassed one billion accumulated downloads outside China by 2021. By 2022, third-party mobile market estimates placed lifetime player spending for PUBG Mobile at more than US$8 billion across the App Store and Google Play. In India, Battlegrounds Mobile India reached more than 240 million downloads by 2025.

=== Business significance to Krafton ===
PUBG has been central to Krafton's business identity. In 2021, Krafton sought one of South Korea's largest stock market listings, with the company described in market coverage through its association with PlayerUnknown's Battlegrounds. After listing, Krafton's share performance and investor concerns were linked to the company's exposure to Asian markets and Chinese gaming regulation, with a large share of revenue outside South Korea connected to Tencent-handled sales and Peacekeeper Elite technology services.

Krafton's later strategy placed PUBG alongside broader franchise development. The company said in 2026 that it would accelerate the growth of the PUBG intellectual property while also developing new titles that could become franchise properties. The strategy included live-service development, platform-style user-generated content, and a wider game pipeline intended to reduce dependence on a single title while continuing to grow the PUBG brand.

== Legacy and influence ==
PUBG: Battlegrounds helped bring the battle royale genre from modding communities into mainstream commercial gaming. Its rapid early access sales, high player counts, and influence on later battle royale titles made PUBG one of the central games in the genre's late-2010s expansion. The game also influenced the development of battle royale esports by attempting to adapt a large-scale, unpredictable multiplayer format into a spectator competition.

The franchise's later direction reflected broader trends in online games, including free-to-play business models, mobile-first regional versions, live-service updates, cross-media expansion, and user-generated content. Its mobile and regional versions also made the franchise significant in Asian mobile markets, especially in China and India, where PUBG-related titles became important to Krafton's and Tencent's business strategies.

== See also ==
- List of battle royale games
