= Lirik (gamer) =

American Twitch streamer

- Lirik's Twitch logo
- Born: Saqib Ali Zahid; 29 October 1990 (age 35)
- Occupation: Streamer
- Known for: Variety streaming on Twitch

Twitch information
- Channel: LIRIK
- Years active: 2011–present
- Genre: Gaming
- Followers: 3 million

YouTube information
- Channel: Lirik
- Years active: 2012–present
- Genre: Gaming
- Subscribers: 281,000
- Views: 74 million
- Last updated: September 2, 2026

Saqib Ali Zahid, better known by his online alias Lirik (stylized LIRIK), is an American variety streamer on Twitch. He is one of the platform's longest-tenured and most-watched broadcasters, and has been described as the definitive Twitch variety streamer, having played more different games and categories than almost anyone in the platform's history. He is sponsored by Discord, as one of a group of influencers the company pays for promotion.

== Career ==
Zahid began streaming on Twitch in 2011, initially playing World of Warcraft. His channel rose to prominence in 2012 through DayZ, which established him among Twitch's top streamers. He subsequently became known for rapidly cycling through new releases across many genres rather than committing to a single title, and for broadcasting without an on-screen webcam. In a June 2020 stream he said one reason he never used a webcam early on was a belief that, as a brown-skinned streamer, he might not have grown as quickly if he had.

Zahid was an early player of Brendan "PlayerUnknown" Greene's DayZ: Battle Royale mod, and Greene later recalled him as a notable early adopter whose repeated play signaled the mod's appeal. His streams of Greene's battle royale mods have been credited with helping popularize the genre. Daybreak Game Company developer Adam Clegg said that Zahid's decision to stream the Arma 2 mod was a catalyst for the battle royale boom, and that games such as Fortnite and PUBG: Battlegrounds might not exist without it. According to ESPN, Clegg first encountered the mod while watching one of Zahid's Twitch streams, prompting him to reach out to Greene during the development of H1Z1.

He hosts a recurring "Subscriber Sunday" event in which subscribers vote on the games he plays. In 2017 he began streaming PUBG: Battlegrounds, though he later criticized the game as buggy and stale, and was invited to a Twitch-hosted PUBG charity tournament with $200,000 in prizes directed to the participants' chosen charities.

In January 2018 he announced a short break from streaming, citing burnout, and returned about a week later. During the 2019 wave of streamers leaving Twitch for Mixer, he stated he would remain on Twitch, and in December 2019 signed a multi-year exclusive contract with the platform alongside DrLupo and TimTheTatman.

Following a 2021 data leak of Twitch creator payouts, Dot Esports reported that Zahid ranked among the platform's ten highest-earning streamers for the August 2019 to October 2021 period, with a reported payout of roughly $2.98 million. As of the mid-2020s his channel had roughly three million followers.

== Personal life ==
In August 2022, Zahid announced on stream and via Twitter that he had become a father. His brother, who streams under the name dasMEHDI, is also a Twitch streamer.

== Awards ==
Ceremony	Year	Category	Result	Ref.
The Streamer Awards	2025	Best Variety Streamer	Nominated	
