= AAA (video game industry) =

High-budget video game

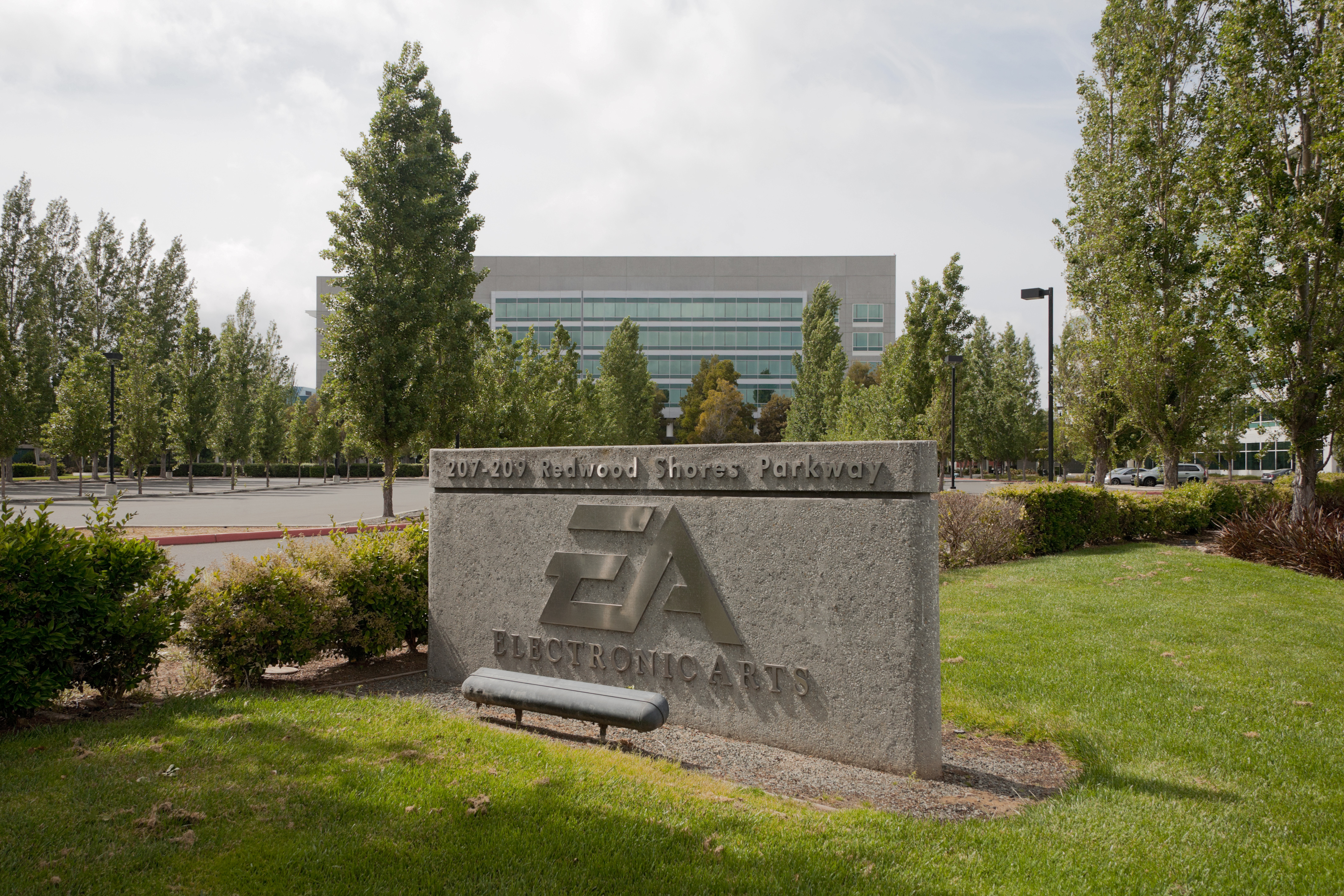
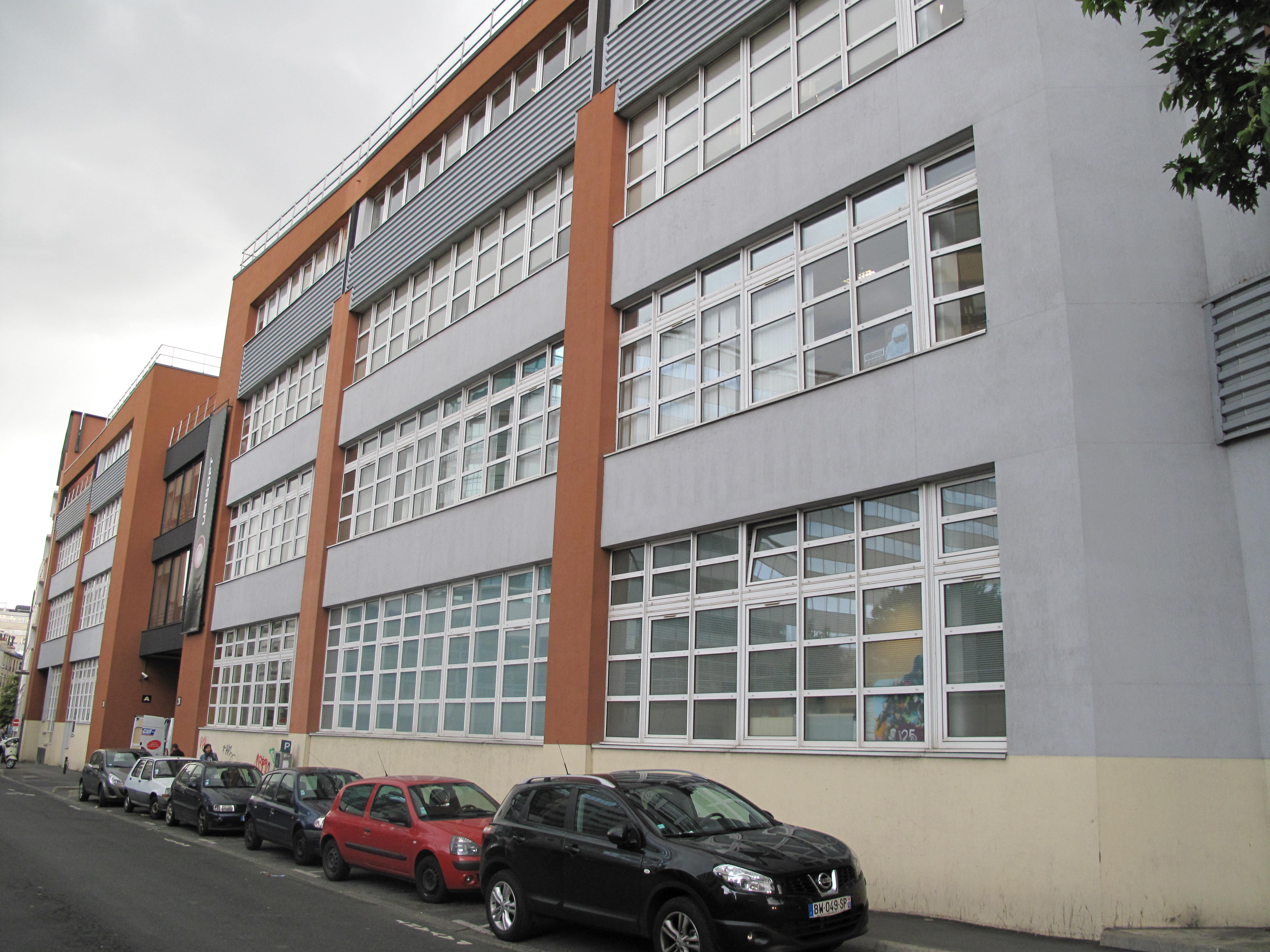
Electronic Arts (top) and Ubisoft (bottom) are examples of AAA companies in the video game industry.

In the video game industry, AAA, pronounced as triple-A, is a term used to classify video games produced or distributed by a mid-sized or major publisher, which typically have higher development and marketing budgets than other tiers of games. The term originated in the 1990s and 2000s as development budgets for high-profile video games, such as Final Fantasy VII, grew into the tens of millions of U.S. dollars. Such costs were incurred due to the use of cinematic cutscenes and voice acting, coupled with higher fidelity graphics made possible with video game hardware.

By the late 2010s and early 2020s, the boundaries of the AAA label had become increasingly fluid as development budgets rose and production pipelines grew more complex. Some industry commentators noted that the escalating cost of producing large-scale titles encouraged publishers to invest primarily in established franchises, leading to fewer experimental projects within the AAA space. Others argued that advancements in game engines, digital distribution, and crowdfunding allowed smaller studios to achieve production values approaching those of traditional AAA teams, further blurring categorical distinctions. AAA games also began heavily to rely on microtransactions and operating as live service games. Such changes led to the growth of the indie game market in the mid 2010s, as well as other categories of games, such as AA games, representing works by smaller teams but with the quality and approach used in AAA games.

== History ==
The term "AAA" began to be used in the late 1990s by game retailers attempting to gauge interest in upcoming titles. The term was likely borrowed from the credit industry's bond ratings, where "AAA" bonds represent the safest investment opportunity and are the most likely to meet their financial goals.

One of the first video games to be produced at a blockbuster or AAA scale was SquareSoft's Final Fantasy VII (1997), which cost an estimated $40–45 million (inflation adjusted $80–90 million) to develop, making it the most expensive video game ever produced up until then, with its unprecedented cinematic CGI production values, movie-like presentation and innovative blend of gameplay with dynamic cinematic camerawork. Its expensive advertisement campaign was also unprecedented for a video game, with a combined production and marketing budget estimated to be $80–145 million (inflation adjusted $160–290 million). Its production budget record was later surpassed by Sega AM2's Shenmue (1999), estimated to have cost $47–70 million (inflation adjusted $91–140 million).

By the seventh generation of video game consoles (late 2000s), AAA game development on the Xbox 360 or PlayStation 3 game consoles typically cost in the low tens of millions of dollars ($15–20 million) for a new game, with some sequels having even higher total budgets – for example Halo 3 is estimated to have had a development cost of $30 million, and a marketing budget of $40 million. According to a whitepaper published for EA games (Dice Europe), the seventh generation saw a contraction in the number of video game developing houses creating AAA level titles, reducing from an estimated 125 to around 25, but with a roughly corresponding fourfold increase in staffing required for game development.

Triple-A titles produced during the late 1990s and early 2000s brought a shift towards more narrative-driven games that mixed storytelling elements with gameplay. The earlier widespread adoption of optical media from early-1990s had brought elements like cutscenes, and the advances in real-time 3D graphics in the mid-1990s further drove new ways to present stories; both elements were incorporated into Final Fantasy VII. With larger budgets, developers were able to find new innovative ways to present narrative as a direct part of gameplay rather than interspersed into pre-rendered cutscenes, with Half-Life one of the first of these new narrative games to nearly eliminate cutscenes in favor of interactive storytelling mechanisms.

During the seventh generation, AAA (or "blockbuster") games had marketing at a similar level to high-profile films, with television, billboard and newspaper advertising; a corresponding increasing reliance on sequels, reboots, and similarly franchised IP was also seen, in order to minimize risk. Costs at the end of the generation had risen as high as the hundreds of millions of dollars – the estimated cost of Grand Theft Auto V was approximately $265m. The same conditions also drove the growth of the indie game scene at the other end of the development spectrum, where lower costs enabled innovation and risk-taking.

At around the period of transition from seventh to eighth generation of consoles, the cost of AAA development was considered by some to be a threat to the stability of the industry. Staffing and costs for eighth generation games increased; at Ubisoft, AAA game development involved 400 to 600 persons for open world games, split across multiple locations and countries. The failure of a single game to meet production costs could lead to the failure of a studio – Radical Entertainment was closed by parent Activision despite selling an estimated one million units on console in a short period after release. Triple-A games also began to lose uniqueness and novelty; a common trend were a range of "grey brown" first-person shooters that drew on the popularity of the Medal of Honor and Call of Duty series but did little to advance gameplay improvements. Ubisoft game director Alex Hutchinson described the AAA franchise model as potentially harmful, stating he thought it led to either focus group-tested products aimed at maximizing profit, and/or a push towards ever higher graphics fidelity and impact at a cost of depth or gameplay.

The limited risk-taking in the AAA arena and stagnation of new gameplay concepts led to the rise of indie games in the early 2010s, which were seen as more experimental. This also led to the creation of the "AA" market in the industry, larger studios that were not at the scale of AAA developers but had more experience, funding, and other factors to make them distinct from the smaller teams usually associated with indie studios.

AAA game development has been identified as one environment where crunch time and other working pressures that negatively affect employees are particularly evident.

In a 2023 report by the UK Competition and Markets Authority which blocked the proposed acquisition of Activision Blizzard by Microsoft it was stated that AAA games that were greenlit for a potential release in 2024 and 2025 received an average development budget of $200 million and up an increase from an average of a $50 million to $150 million from 2018. Court documents presented in a case accusing Activision of contributing towards the Uvalde school shooting revealed that the budgets for three Call of Duty games released between 2015 and 2020 had budgets of $450 million to $700 million, while Gears of War: E-Day in 2026 had a reported $500 million budget. Rockstar Games' 2026 Grand Theft Auto VI was reported to have a budget up to $1.5 billion, though Rockstar has denied these rumors.

== Related terms ==
=== AAA+ ===
In general use, the term "AAA+" (Triple-A-Plus) may refer to a subset of AAA games that are the highest selling or have the highest production values. However, there are at least two more specific meanings.

The first describes AAA games with additional methods of revenue generation, generally through purchases in addition to the cost of the base game. The desire for profitability has caused publishers to look at alternative revenue models, where players continued to contribute revenue after the initial purchase, either by premium models, DLC, online passes, and other forms of subscription. In the mid 2010s large publishers began a focus on games engineered to have a long tail in terms of revenue from individual consumers, similar to the way MMO games generate income – these included those with expansion or season pass content such as with Destiny, Battlefield, and the Call of Duty series; and those which generated revenue from selling in-game items, sometimes purely cosmetic, such as Overwatch or League of Legends. Titles of this type are sometimes referred to as "AAA+". In 2016, Gameindustry.biz described AAA+ games as products that "combine AAA production values and aesthetics with Software as a Service (SaaS) principles to keep players engaged for months or even years".

=== AA (Double-A) ===
"AA" or Double-A games are mid-market video games that typically have some type of professional development though typically outside of the large first-party studios of the major developers; these may be from larger teams of indie developers or from smaller non-indie studios. Double-A studios tend to range from 50 to 100 people in size. A double-A development studio will typically be backed by a publisher but not fundamentally part of that publisher, and thus have somewhat more freedom to innovate and experiment compared to triple-A studios, though will still be constrained by specific risk-limiting targets and goals from their funding source. Double-A games generally tend to be priced lower compared to triple-A games. Examples of games considered to be double-A titles include PUBG: Battlegrounds, DayZ, and Clair Obscur: Expedition 33.

=== III ===
"III" (Triple-I) has been used to refer to independently funded ("indie") games that meet an analogous quality level in their field; i.e., indie games that have relatively high budget, scope, and ambition; often the development team includes staff who have experience working on full AAA titles.

In 2018, GamesIndustry.biz considered examples of III games to include Ancestors: The Humankind Odyssey, Hellblade: Senua's Sacrifice, and The Witness.

=== AAAA ===
Starting in 2020 leading up to the launch of the PS5 and the Xbox Series X, two studios started using the term AAAA (Quadruple-A) to describe upcoming games in development. Microsoft's studio, The Initiative, was working on its debut title Perfect Dark for Xbox that was self-described as being a AAAA game, though the game would end up being cancelled.

Ubisoft announced Beyond Good and Evil 2 and Skull and Bones would both be AAAA games. Despite the announcements, there is no agreed-upon definition for the term AAAA or what it entails. Olivia Harris of Screen Rant noted in September 2020 that "it hasn't been adopted by the game industry at large," adding that "perhaps it's just the latest self-aggrandizing buzzword conjured up to help games stand out in their incredibly competitive field."

=== Other terms ===
The console video game industry lacks the equivalent of a B movie, made-for-TV, or direct-to-video scene. However, titles such as Deadly Premonition and Binary Domain have been dubbed "B games" due to developing cult followings or accruing significant amounts of critical praise despite widely acknowledged flaws, with critics often noting that such a game's ambitions in the face of budget limitations add to the game's charm (a trait common among B movies). Games like this are the exception and, when they are not critically well-received, are often referred to as "bargain bin" titles. The term shovelware has also been used to describe games that are quickly made without great care for the quality of the product as to make easy sales to consumers, as a metaphor for shoveling material onto a pile. Licensed video game tie-ins for films often tend to be considered shovelware, for example.

A data analysis study performed by Hushcrusher in 2025 evaluated a possible taxonomy for describing the scale of video game production, given the loose definitions between AAA, AA, and indie games. From a data cluster analysis on games released since 2006, they found four major groups based on the number of the names in the game's credits, and the total file size of the game's distribution. AAA games would typically have thousands of people credited with distributions around 100 GB or greater, while AA games have from 100 to 1000 credits with sizes around 50 GB. Their taxonomy then breaks indie games into two classes: Midi, with teams from around 50 to 100 people and file sizes up to about 10 GB, and Kei (based on the class of Japanese Kei cars), with teams up to a few dozens and small file sizes.

== See also ==
- Nintendo Seal of Quality
- List of most expensive video games to develop
