= PUBG Mobile =

Free-to-play battle royale video game

- Developers: LightSpeed Studios; PUBG Corporation
- Publishers: WW: Tencent Games: KOR/JPN: Krafton; TW: HotCool Game; VIE: VNG Games
- Composers: Jeff Broadbent; Obadiah Brown-Beach; Laurent Courbier; Mason Lieberman; Geng Li (as Reagan Li); Thomas Parisch; Tom Salta; Brian Tyler; Inon Zur; C. May Xiao (Note: Jeff Broadbent, Brian Tyler, Inon Zur & C. May Xiao composed Chinese version "Game for Peace" or "He ping jing ying" only. Mason Lieberman and Geng Li (as Reagan Li) composed on both versions.)
- Series: PUBG
- Engine: Unreal Engine 4
- Platforms: Android iOS iPadOS; HarmonyOS
- Release: March 2018; 8 years ago
- Genre: Battle royale
- Mode: Multiplayer

PUBG Mobile (Note: Previously short for PlayerUnknown's Battlegrounds Mobile, and known in China as Game for Peace (also known as Peacekeeper Elite or He ping jing ying)) is a free-to-play multiplayer battle royale game co-developed by LightSpeed Studios and Pubg Corporation. It is a mobile game adaptation of PUBG: Battlegrounds. It was initially released for Android and iOS on 19 March 2018.

The game was published by multiple publishers in different regions, including Krafton, Tencent, and VNG Corporation. By January 2026, PUBG Mobile had accumulated around 1.75 billion downloads while grossing over $15 billion. It is also one of the most-played mobile video games of all time. In 2021, the game spawned an Indian version, Battlegrounds Mobile India, and a separate game taking place in the PUBG Universe, called New State Mobile.

== Gameplay ==
PUBG Mobile features gameplay similar to that of the original PUBG: Battlegrounds, in which up to one hundred players fight in a battle royale, a type of large-scale last man standing deathmatch where players fight to remain the last alive. Players can choose to enter the match solo, duo, or with a small team of up to four people. The last person or team alive wins the match.

Each match starts with players parachuting from a plane onto one of the several maps. The plane's flight path across the map varies with each round, requiring players to quickly determine the best time to eject and parachute to the ground. Players start with no gear beyond customized clothing selections which do not affect gameplay. Once they land, players can search buildings, ghost towns and other sites to find weapons, vehicles, armor, and other equipment. These items are procedurally distributed throughout the map at the start of a match, with certain high-risk zones typically having better equipment. Killed players can be looted to acquire their gear as well. Players can opt to play either from the first-person or third-person perspective, each having their own advantages and disadvantages in combat and situational awareness.

Every few minutes, the playable area of the map begins to shrink down towards a random location, with any player caught outside the safe area taking damage incrementally, and eventually being eliminated if the safe zone is not entered in time; in game, the players see the boundary as a shimmering blue wall that contracts over time. This results in a more confined map, in turn increasing the chances of encounters. During the course of the match, random regions of the map are highlighted in red and bombed, posing a threat to players who remain in that area. In both cases, players are warned a few minutes before these events, giving them time to relocate to safety. A plane will fly over various parts of the playable map occasionally at random, or wherever a player uses a flare gun, and drop a loot package, containing items which are typically unobtainable during normal gameplay. These packages emit highly visible red smoke, drawing interested players near it and creating further confrontations. On average, a full round takes about 30 minutes.

Additional features unique to the mobile version of PUBG include log-in bonuses, missions and micro-goals, crew recruiting, map and compass improvements with larger and clear markers near the teammates, and an auto loot system, as well as an increased number of bots.

== Development ==
PUBG Mobile is the mobile adaptation of the popular battle royale game, PUBG: Battlegrounds, developed by PUBG Studios and LightSpeed Studios, and published by Tencent Games worldwide, while Krafton and VNG Corporation in India, Korea and Vietnam respectively. The game was released in March 2018 and has since become one of the most popular mobile games in the world.

The development of PUBG Mobile took just 4 months to be completed, as multiple teams from around the world contributed to the project. The project began with the original PC and console version of the game, which was developed by Brendan Greene (known as PlayerUnknown) and released in 2017. Following the success of that particular game, Tencent Games began their development project with PUBG Studios for the mobile version. In doing so, they had to create an evolution of the Unreal Engine 4, which was optimized to suit the mobile platform, with a focus on smoother performance and enhanced graphics.

An abridged version of the game for lower-end Android devices, PUBG Mobile Lite, was first released in Thailand on 24 January 2019 before releasing in Asian, Latin American, and African countries.

== Release ==
Following an international deal for the Windows version, Tencent Games and PUBG Corporation announced plans to release two mobile versions of the game in China. PUBG was initially launched for PC in 2017, marking what many considered the very first battle royale and large-scale battle ground game. At that time, there were no other games of this genre, and PUBG quickly reached its peak popularity among PC players.

The game introduced the revolutionary concept of players parachuting down from an airplane onto an open map, a design that later became a standard feature in the battle royale genre. One of the most notable maps during this period was Erangel, which received wide attention and was considered the most influential and popular map of its time.

During its early years, PUBG PC stood out for its unique survival mechanics, massive 100-player battles, and its innovative approach to competitive gaming. These features not only attracted millions of players worldwide but also laid the foundation for the global popularity of the battle royale format. The first, PUBG: Exhilarating Battlefield, is an abridged version of the original game and was developed by LightSpeed & Quantum Studio, an internal division of Tencent Games. The second, PUBG Army Attack,(aka PUBG Mobile Marching) included more arcade-style elements, including action taking place on warships, and was developed by Tencent's TiMi Studio Group. Both versions were free-to-play, and were released for Android and IOS devices on 9 February 2018. The games had a combined total of 75 million pre-registrations, and ranked first and second on the Chinese iOS download charts at launch. Following a soft launch in Canada, an English version of Exhilarating Battlefield, localized as PUBG Mobile, was released worldwide on 19 March 2018. PUBG Mobile KR, a Korean and Japanese oriented version, and PUBG Mobile VN, a Vietnamese oriented version, were released in June 2018 and January 2019 respectively.

In China, PUBG Mobile had been awaiting approval by the government for an authorised release, during which the game could only be offered as a public test. However, Tencent's planned release was suspended due to the government approval freeze across most of 2018. By May 2019, Tencent announced it would no longer seek to publish PUBG Mobile in China, but instead would re-release the game under the title Game for Peace; this version of the game changed elements of the original game to meet China's content restrictions, such as eliminating blood and gore. Following its release, a Taiwanese version of the game, PUBG Mobile TW, was released.

A version meant for lower-end mobile devices, PUBG Mobile Lite, was released on 25 July 2019. support for high FPS gameplay on multiple Android devices and features a smaller map made for 60 players. The Chinese version of the app was again renamed to Peacekeeper Elite in 2020.

On 31 October 2020, the Tencent-developed version of PUBG Mobile announced that it would be ceasing operations in India. On 13 November 2020, PUBG Corporation, a subsidiary of Krafton responsible for operating PUBG Mobile, officially announced that the Indian version of PUBG Mobile would be released soon. On 6 May 2021, PUBG Studios officially announced that the Indian version of PUBG Mobile would be renamed to Battlegrounds Mobile India (BGMI) and would be released soon. On 14 May 2021, PUBG Studios officially announced that pre-registrations for BGMI would be available through Google Play starting 18 May 2021.

== Controversies ==
=== Bans ===
On 2 September 2020, the Ministry of Electronics and Information Technology banned PUBG Mobile in India amid the 2020–2021 China–India skirmishes. Following this, Tencent Games terminated all services for users in India on 30 October 2020.

On 6 May 2021, Krafton announced the relaunch of the game in India, following the ban imposed by the Government of India. Krafton published the game in the country as Battlegrounds Mobile India (BGMI), which can only be accessed by users in the country. In 2022, BGMI was removed from the Play Store and the Apple App Store as per orders from the Indian Government due to an alleged data leak to Chinese servers, however the game could still be played and installed using an .apk file. On 19 May 2023, Krafton publicly announced BGMI was being relaunched for a trial period after a 10-month long dispute. The game was finally re-released on 27 May for Android users and 29 May for iOS users. However, on both the platforms, it was playable only after 29 May.

== Esports ==
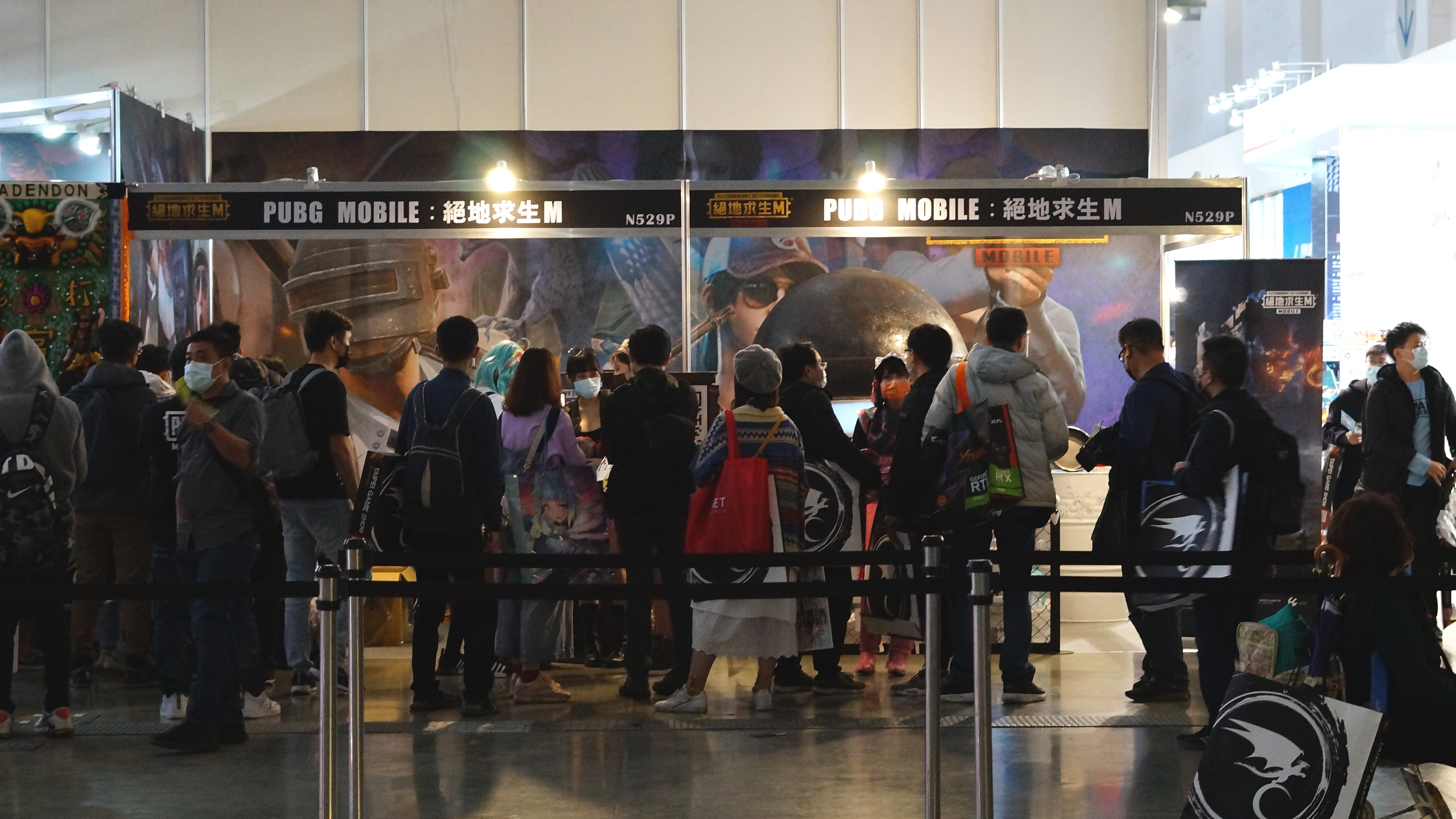
PUBG Mobile booth at Taipei International Video Game Show in 2021

The game supports several e-sport leagues and tournaments. Each major region has a PUBG Mobile Club Open (PMCO) and players compete in their respective regions until later tournaments. Only 32 teams can qualify out of the many teams that signed up. This phase is known as the PMCO group stage, where the 32 teams are divided into four groups of eight. PMCO in Indonesia was held in 2017 for the first time, and the winner of the tournament was Fabyo and his team. Once the group stages have elapsed, the finals are hosted where the top 16 teams play. From here, the teams compete to make it to a higher level of competition known as the PUBG Mobile Pro League (PMPL). Later, eSports grew a lot in various countries including India, China, Indonesia, and many more, giving opportunities to many potential players.

== Reception ==
Reception

Aggregate score
Aggregator	Score
Metacritic	iOS: 82/100

Review scores
Publication	Score
GameSpot	8/10
IGN	8.7/10
Jeuxvideo.com	16/20
Pocket Gamer	4/5

PUBG Mobile received "generally favourable" reviews according to the review aggregator website Metacritic.

=== Downloads ===
PUBG Mobile was the second most-downloaded mobile game of 2018, with nearly 300 million downloads worldwide. The game's largest market was China, which accounted for 29% of the game's downloads, followed by India and the United States, each with about 10% (30 million) of its downloads. It was the most-installed battle royale game of 2018, with about 200 million more installs than Fortnite. In March 2021, PUBG Mobile had accumulated more than a billion downloads outside of China. Including Game for Peace, the Chinese version of the game, and Battlegrounds Mobile India, the game had a monthly player count of around 30 million daily active users as of 2026. In January 2026, PUBG Mobile achieved over 1 billion downloads on the Play Store alone, making it one of the most popular games on the internet. The game receives regular updates and seasonal events, contributing to its continued popularity across multiple regions. Although PUBG Mobile has hundreds of millions of downloads globally, its active player base in the United Kingdom is generally considered smaller than in regions such as India, Pakistan, and Southeast Asia, where the game has a stronger esports presence and a larger community.

=== Revenue ===
PUBG Mobile grossed ¥3.58 billion ($32.42 million) in Japan in 2018. PUBG Mobile grossed over $3.5 billion in revenue by August 2020. PUBG Mobile grossed over $2.6 billion in 2020, making it the highest-grossing game of the year and bringing its total revenue to over $4.3 billion as of December 2020. That figure had increased to over $9 billion as of December 2022. In 2025, Krafton has reported record breaking earning at $1.85 billion with net profits of 119% YoY as of December 2024.

=== Awards ===
Year	Awards	Category	Result	Ref.
2018	Golden Joystick Awards	Mobile Game of the Year	Won	
2018	The Game Awards 2018	Best Mobile Game	Nominated	
2018	Gamers' Choice Awards	Fan Favorite Mobile Game	Nominated	
2019	Italian Video Game Awards 2019	Best Mobile Game	Nominated	
2019	37th Golden Joystick Awards	Esports Game of the Year	Nominated	
2019	Google Play Users' Choice Awards	Best Competitive Game	Won	
2019	Nickelodeon Kids' Choice Awards India	Favourite Mobile Game	Nominated	
2019	Esports Awards	Esports Breakthrough Game of The Year	Nominated	
2020	Indonesia Gaming Awards	Game of the Year	Won	
2020	Esports Awards	Esports Mobile Game of the Year	Nominated	
2021	Esports Awards	Esports Mobile Game of the Year	Nominated	
2022	Esports Awards	Esports Mobile Game of the Year	Won	
