= List of most expensive video games to develop =

The following is a list of the most expensive video games ever developed, with a minimum total cost of US$50 million and sorted by the total cost adjusted for inflation. Most game budgets are not disclosed, so this list is not indicative of industry trends.

== Lists ==
– Indicates ongoing costs of development post-release

=== Official figures ===
Name	Year	Costs (million US$)				Ref.
Name	Year	Development	Marketing	Total	Total (2025 inflation)	Ref.
Star Citizen and Squadron 42	TBA (Note: Playable elements of Star Citizen were first released in 2013, but the game remains in early access, with no final release date announced. Costs representative of development up to 2024.)	760.7+	193.8+	954.6+	1,120+	
Monopoly Go!	2023		1,000	1,000	1,026	
Genshin Impact	2020 (Note: Includes ongoing costs as of 2024)			900+ (Note: US$100 million for initial development, US$200 million annually for ongoing development as of 2024)	998+	
Call of Duty: Black Ops Cold War	2020			700	871	
Call of Duty: Modern Warfare	2019			640	806	
Call of Duty: Black Ops III	2015			450	611	
Cyberpunk 2077	2020	174	142	441.9 (Note: Approximately US$316 million for original game and US$125.9 million for Update 2.0 upgrade and Phantom Liberty downloadable content)	526	
Cyberpunk 2077	2023 (Note: Update 2.0 upgrade and Phantom Liberty downloadable content)	103.6 (Note: US$40.9 million for Update 2.0 and US$62.7 million for Phantom Liberty DLC)	21.6	441.9	526	
Gears of War: E-Day	2026	500+ (Note: Includes operational costs of The Coalition's ongoing game engine work for parent company Xbox Game Studios)		500+	500+	
Battlefield 6	2025			400+	400	
Marvel's Spider-Man 3 (Note: Unannounced game) (Note: Projected figure)	TBA			385	407	
World of Warcraft	2004	63+		263+ (Note: More than €50 million (US$63 million) for initial development and US$200 million for ongoing development and maintenance as of 2008.)	406+	
Call of Duty: Modern Warfare 2	2009	40–50	150–160	200	360–375	
Marvel's Spider-Man 2	2023			315	333	
Marvel's Wolverine	2026			305	322	
The Last of Us Part II	2020	220		220	274	
Marvel's Spider-Man: Miles Morales	2020	81.7	25.1	213.3 (Note: Includes US$106.5 million licensing fee)	265	
Horizon Forbidden West	2022	212		212	233	
Halo 2	2004	40	80	120	205	
Destiny	2014			140	190	
The Callisto Protocol	2022			162	178	
Dead Space 2	2011	60	60	120	172	
Final Fantasy VII	1997	40–45	40–100	80–145	160–291	
Grand Theft Auto IV	2008			100+	150+	
Undawn	2023			140	148	
Shadow of the Tomb Raider	2018	75–100	35	110–135	141–173	
Battlefield 4	2013	100		100	138	
Immortals of Aveum	2023	80	45	125	132	
The Witcher 3: Wild Hunt	2015			81	110	
Final Fantasy VIII	1999			50	97	
Ratchet & Clank: Rift Apart	2021			81	96	
Watch Dogs	2014			68+	92+	
Shenmue	1999	47		47–70	91–135	
Tom Clancy's Ghost Recon: Future Soldier	2012			65	91	
Gran Turismo 5	2010			60	89	
Rift	2011	50+	10–20	60–70+	86–100+	
Gears of War: Judgment	2013			60	83	
Jak 3	2004	10		45–50	77–85	
Heavy Rain	2010	21.8	30.4	52.2	77	
Final Fantasy IX	2000			40	75	
Ghost of Tsushima	2020	60		60	75	
Black Myth: Wukong	2024			70	72	
Lords of the Fallen	2023	42.2	24.4 (Note: US$19.3 million for marketing and US$5.1 million for production of physical copies)	66.6	70	
E.T. the Extra-Terrestrial	1982			21–22 (Note: Licensing fee)	70–73	
Darksiders II	2012			50	70	
Gears of War 3	2011			48–60	69–86	
Half-Life 2	2004			40+	68+	
Kingdom Under Fire II	2019			50+	68+	
God of War III	2010	44		44	65	
Control Resonant	2026	52.9		52.9	54	

==== Cancelled games ====
Name	Year cancelled	Costs (million US$)		Ref.
Name	Year cancelled	Development	2025 inflation	Ref.
Titan Project	2007–2008	90	135	
Wonder Woman	2025	100+	100	
Fable Legends	2016	75	101	
This Is Vegas	2009–2010	40–50	59–74	
Volt	2021	53	53	

=== Unofficial figures ===
==== Analyst estimations ====
Name	Year	Analyst(s)	Costs (million US$)				Ref.
Name	Year	Analyst(s)	Dev	Marketing	Total	Total (2025 inflation)	Ref.
Grand Theft Auto V	2013	Sterne Agee	137.5	69–109.3	206.5–246.8	285–341	
Red Dead Redemption 2	2018	Wedbush Securities	170		170	218	
Halo 5: Guardians	2015	Wedbush Securities	160		160	217	
Marvel's Avengers	2020	Astris Advisory			170+	211+	
Final Fantasy VII Remake	2020	Shibaura Institute of Technology	144		144	179	
Final Fantasy VII Remake	2020	Jefferies & Company	<140		<140	<174	
Max Payne 3	2012	Sterne Agee	105		105	147	
Tomb Raider	2013	Billy Pidgeon			100	138	
Resident Evil 2	2019	Jefferies & Company	<100		<100	<126	
Halo 3	2007	Wedbush Securities	30+	15–20	60+	93+	
Alan Wake 2	2023	Inderes	53.5	21.5	75	79	
ARC Raiders	2025	Wedbush Securities			75	75	
Warhammer Online: Age of Reckoning	2008	Wedbush Securities	50		50	75	
Grand Theft Auto IV	2008	Wedbush Securities	45		45	67	

==== Press estimations ====
The following budgets have been estimated by press outlets without naming any specific analyst or firm.

Name	Year	Press outlet(s)	Costs (million US$)				Ref.
Name	Year	Press outlet(s)	Dev	Marketing	Total	Total (2025 inflation)	Ref.
Grand Theft Auto VI	2026	Several (Note: Several outlets reported on Grand Theft Auto VI's rumored US$1–2 billion budget, though the figure was unverified. Jennifer Kolbe, Rockstar Games's head of publishing, denied that the budget surpassed $1.5 billion.)			1,000–1,500	1,000–1,500	
MindsEye	2025	Gameranx			500	500	
Grand Theft Auto V	2013	The Scotsman			265	366	
Star Wars: The Old Republic	2011	Los Angeles Times			200+	286+	
Red Dead Redemption 2	2018	VentureBeat		200–300	200–300	256–385	
Concord	2024	Kotaku			200+	205+	
Skull and Bones	2024	Insider Gaming			200	205	
Marathon	2026	Forbes			200–250+	200–250+	
Enter the Matrix	2003	Variety	20	80 (Note: Including licensing fee and distribution)	100	175	
Enter the Matrix	2003	Wall Street Journal	20		80 (Note: Including licensing fee)	140	
Hogwarts Legacy	2023	CNN Business			150	159	
APB: All Points Bulletin	2010	The Guardian			100	148	
Disney Infinity	2013	Los Angeles Times			100+	138+	
Deadpool	2013	GameSpot			100 (Note: Chris Baker, former interactive manager at Marvel Games, disputed Deadpool's US$100 million figure in 2024 and claimed the actual budget was "not even close".)	138	
Mass Effect: Andromeda	2017	Edmonton Journal			100	131	
Red Dead Redemption	2010	The New York Times			80–100	118–148	
Defiance	2013	Forbes	80		80	111	
Mortal Kombat II	1994	San Francisco Chronicle			50	109	
Sonic & Knuckles	1994	Los Angeles Times		45	45	98	
Too Human	2008	USgamer			60–100	90–150	
Call of Duty: Black Ops	2010	Los Angeles Times			50+	74	
DC Universe Online	2011	Los Angeles Times	50		50	72	
L.A. Noire	2011	BBC News	50		50	72	
Super Mario Bros. 3	1988	The Seattle Times	0.8		25.8+	70+	
Super Mario Bros. 3	1988	The Indianapolis Star		25+	25.8+	70+	
Final Fantasy X	2001	Yomiuri Shimbun	32.3		32.3+	62+	
Halo 3	2007	The Hollywood Reporter		40	40	62	

== See also ==
- Lists of video games
