= List of best-selling Xbox One video games =

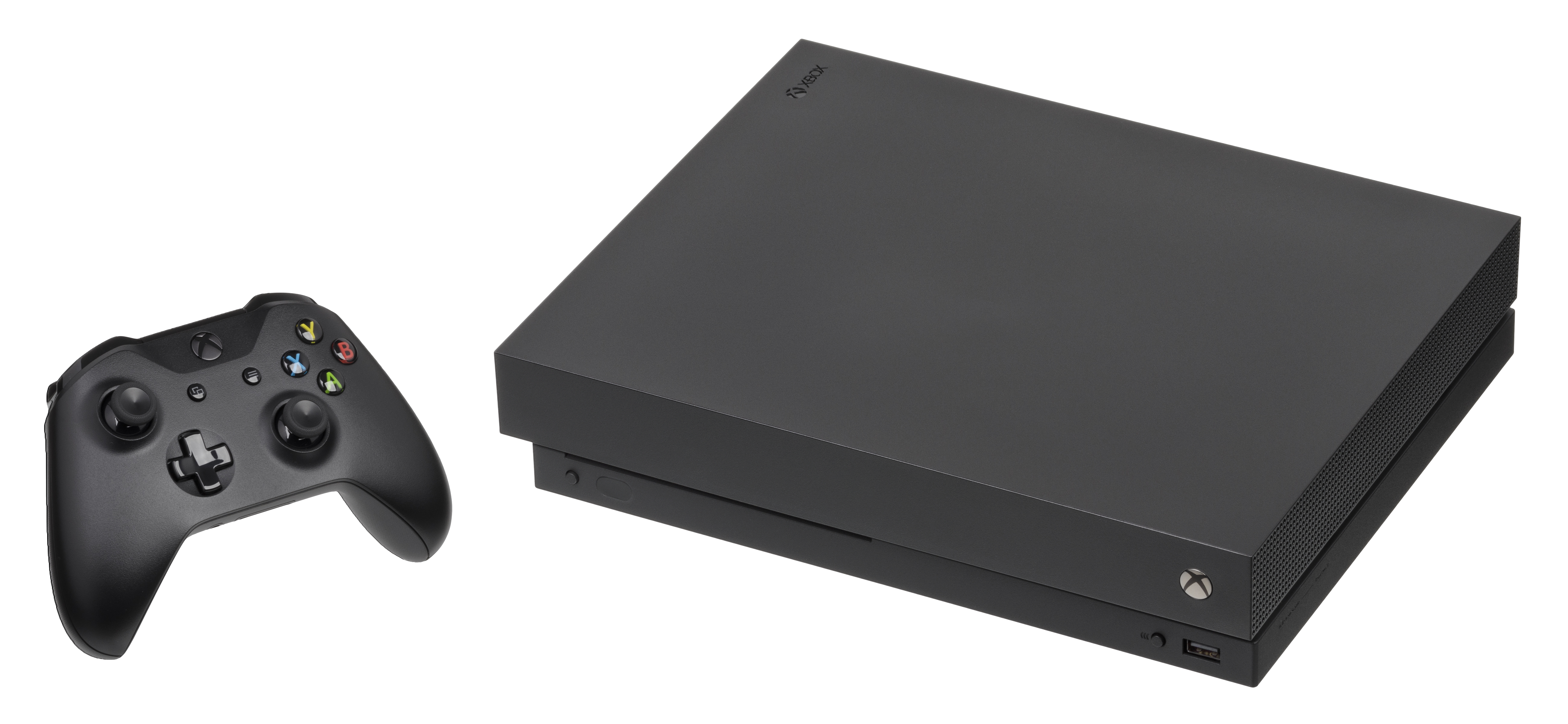
Xbox One X console with its controller

This is a list of video games for the Xbox One video game console that have sold or shipped at least one million copies worldwide.

== List ==
List of best-selling Xbox One video games
Game	Copies sold	Release date (Note: Only the initial release date on this platform is listed.)	Genre(s)	Developer(s)	Publisher(s)
Grand Theft Auto V	10.98 million (Note: Of the 90 million total units sold by April 2018, 12.2% of that total were for the Xbox One version.)	November 18, 2014	Action-adventure	Rockstar North	Rockstar Games
Forza Horizon 4	10 million (Note: Combined sales on Xbox One and PC.)	October 2, 2018	Racing	Playground Games	Xbox Game Studios
PUBG: Battlegrounds	9 million	September 4, 2018	Battle royale	PUBG Studios	Krafton
Call of Duty: Black Ops III	7.37 million	November 6, 2015	First-person shooter	Treyarch	Activision
Call of Duty: WWII	6.23 million	November 3, 2017	First-person shooter	Sledgehammer Games	Activision
Call of Duty: Advanced Warfare	5.22 million	November 4, 2014	First-person shooter	Sledgehammer Games	Activision
Halo 5: Guardians	5 million	October 27, 2015	First-person shooter	343 Industries	Xbox Game Studios
Call of Duty: Infinite Warfare	4.79 million	November 4, 2016	First-person shooter	Infinity Ward	Activision
The Witcher 3: Wild Hunt	4.3 million	May 19, 2015	Action role-playing	CD Projekt Red	CD Projekt
Dead Rising 3	4.1 million	November 22, 2013	Action-adventure; survival horror	Capcom Vancouver	Xbox Game Studios
Minecraft: Xbox One Edition	3.72 million	November 18, 2014	Sandbox; survival	4J Studios	Xbox Game Studios
Star Wars Battlefront	3.66 million	November 17, 2015	First-person shooter; third-person shooter	EA DICE	Electronic Arts
Cyberpunk 2077	3.2 million	December 10, 2020	Action role-playing	CD Projekt Red	CD Projekt
Cuphead	3.00 million (Note: Combined sales on Xbox One and PC.)	September 29, 2017	Run and gun	StudioMDHR	StudioMDHR
Forza Horizon 3	2.5 million (Note: Combined sales on Xbox One and PC.)	27 September 2016	Racing	Playground Games	Microsoft Studios
Dragon Ball Xenoverse 2	2.06 million	October 25, 2016	Fighting	Bandai Namco Studios	Bandai Namco Entertainment
Forza Motorsport 5	2 million	November 22, 2013	Racing	Turn 10 Studios	Xbox Game Studios
Dark Souls III	1.9 million	March 24, 2016	Action role-playing	FromSoftware	Bandai Namco Entertainment: JP: FromSoftware
Sunset Overdrive	1.9 million	October 28, 2014	Action-adventure	Insomniac Games	Xbox Game Studios
Monster Hunter World	1.78 million	January 26, 2018	Action role-playing	Capcom	Capcom
Dead Rising 4	1.7 million (Note: Combined sales on Xbox One and PC.)	December 6, 2016	Action-adventure · hack and slash	Capcom Vancouver	Microsoft Game Studios
Dragon Ball FighterZ	1.56 million	January 26, 2018	Fighting	Bandai Namco Studios	Bandai Namco Entertainment
Ark: Survival Evolved	1.5 million	August 29, 2017	Action-adventure; survival	Studio Wildcard	Studio Wildcard
Jump Force	1.27 million	February 14, 2019	Fighting	Spike Chunsoft	Bandai Namco Entertainment
Dark Souls II: Scholar of the First Sin	1.25 million	April 2, 2015	Action role-playing	FromSoftware	Bandai Namco Entertainment: JP: FromSoftware
Dragon Ball Z: Kakarot	1.17 million	January 16, 2020	Action role-playing; Fighting	CyberConnect2	Bandai Namco Entertainment
Tekken 7	1.13 million	June 2, 2017	Fighting	Bandai Namco Studios	Bandai Namco Entertainment
Ryse: Son of Rome	1.28 million	November 22, 2013	Action-adventure · hack and slash	Crytek	Xbox Game Studios
Dragon Ball Xenoverse	1.11 million	February 5, 2015	Fighting	Bandai Namco Studios	Bandai Namco Entertainment
Naruto to Boruto: Shinobi Striker	1.05 million	August 31, 2018	Action; Fighting	Soliel Ltd.	Bandai Namco Entertainment
FIFA 16	1 million	September 22, 2015	Sports	Electronic Arts	Electronic Arts
FIFA 17	1 million	September 27, 2016	Sports	Electronic Arts	Electronic Arts
Forza Motorsport 6	1 million	September 15, 2015	Racing	Turn 10 Studios	Microsoft Studios
Rise of the Tomb Raider	1 million	November 10, 2015	Action-adventure	Crystal Dynamics	Xbox Game Studios
