= New State Mobile =

2021 video game

- Promotional cover art
- Developer: PUBG Studios
- Publisher: Krafton
- Producer: Minkyu Park
- Series: PUBG Universe
- Engine: Unreal Engine 4
- Platforms: iOS, iPadOS, Android
- Release: November 11, 2021; 4 years ago
- Genre: Battle royale
- Mode: Multiplayer

New State Mobile (formerly PUBG: New State) is a free-to-play multiplayer online battle royale video game developed by PUBG Studios and published by Krafton. The game was released on November 11, 2021, for iOS, iPadOS and Android through the App Store, Google Play and Galaxy Store. It is the second installment in the PUBG Universe, separated from PUBG: Battlegrounds and its mobile version.

As of December 2021, the game surpassed 50 million downloads worldwide.

== Gameplay ==
In New State Mobile, 100 players are deployed by jumping out of a plane on a remote 8x8 island called Troi, the game's main map, to collect supplies and battle each other as they fight to survive, with the last one becoming the winner. Troi is set in the year 2051 in the northern United States, with a futuristic environment, buildings, architecture and monuments. New features include drones, ballistic shields, neon sights, combat balancing ability, reviving dead teammates, and "recruiting" downed enemies. Vehicles include futuristic cars, buggies, motorcycles, speedboats and gliders.

New State Mobile features interactive objects and structures with destructible windows and doors, and players can intersperse between a first person and third person perspective. It also features weapon customization with different firing mode selections, grenade launchers, grips, sights, silencers, and other types of weapon accessories.

The game has secondary 4v4 multiplayer modes, such as team deathmatch, where up to four weapon loadouts can be selected. It also features an updated "Erangel" map from the original PUBG.

== Development ==
In February 2021, PUBG Studios, an internal division of Krafton (the company that publishes the game) announced the development of a game codenamed "PUBG: New State", a separate entity to PUBG: Battlegrounds and its mobile version, set in the near future (year 2051) as a part of the PUBG universe.

In July 2021, Krafton reported that the game surpassed 20 million pre-registrations on Google Play. On 28 August the alpha testing concluded after running in 28 countries, and the developers implemented improvements and fixes based on feedback from participating users. In September 2021, after pre-registration opened for IOS, the game surpassed more than 50 million pre-registrations combined on both Google Play and the App Store.

On January 27, 2022, a name change was announced, from PUBG: New State to New State Mobile. The change was subsequently made effective on all platforms.

== Release ==
The game was released worldwide on November 11, 2021, for both iOS and Android.

== Collaborations ==
Beginning with the game's first season, Krafton has collaborated with the Croatian car manufacturer Rimac. Also, the game collaborated with McLaren and Ice Nine Kills in March 2022, Among Us in April 2022, and Dead by Daylight in October 2022.
