= LightSpeed Studios =

Chinese video game developer

- Formerly: LightSpeed & Quantum Studio
- Type: Subsidiary
- Industry: Video games
- Predecessor: Quantum Studios; LightSpeed
- Founded: 2011
- Headquarters: Shenzhen, Guangdong, China
- Area served: Worldwide
- Key people: Jerry Chen (president); Steve C. Martin (Vice president); Michael Pattison (Vice president)
- Parent: Tencent Games
- Website: www.lightspeed-studios.com

LightSpeed Studios (formerly LightSpeed & Quantum Studio) is a Chinese video game development company under Tencent Games, headquartered in Shenzhen, China. It was founded in 2011 through the merger of Quantum Studios and LightSpeed.

The company is known for developing titles such as PUBG Mobile and Peacekeeper Elite. The studio has expanded internationally, establishing multiple branches focused on AAA game development. The company has multiple offices in China, the United States, Singapore, Canada, Britain, France, Japan, South Korea, New Zealand, the United Arab Emirates, and other countries.

== History ==
LightSpeed Studios was originally founded in 2008 as Quantum Studios, a subsidiary of Tencent Games. It was responsible for developing online multiplayer games in China. In 2011, Quantum Studios merged with Aurora Studios, another Tencent subsidiary, to form LightSpeed & Quantum Studio. The team played a key role in Tencent's mobile gaming strategy, working on titles that adapted popular PC and console experiences for mobile platforms.

In 2018, LightSpeed Studios launched PUBG Mobile globally, and it became one of the best-performing mobile games worldwide. By 2022, the game had generated $8 billion in lifetime revenue.

In 2020, Tencent launched LightSpeed LA in Irvine, California, with the goal of developing AAA games for console and PC. Led by industry veterans, the studio focuses on narrative-driven and open-world projects. LightSpeed LA later announced Last Sentinel at The Game Awards 2023, its first AAA open-world game set in a futuristic Japan. In 2021, LightSpeed Studios established Uncapped Games in Los Angeles, California, led by a former Blizzard veteran, to focus on RTS games for PC.

In 2022, the company changed its name to LightSpeed Studios and unveiled a brand-new logo. In 2023, Lightspeed Studios acquired Lucid Games.

In May 2024, Steve C. Martin, the former Rockstar Games producer and General Manager of Lightspeed LA, became the Vice President of LightSpeed Studios. In November 2024, LightSpeed Studios announced the creation of LightSpeed Japan Studio, led by former Capcom producer Hideaki Itsuno. This studio was established to develop new intellectual properties, primarily action games, for global audiences.

In March 2025, LightSpeed Studios announced that it would double down on developing new original intellectual property.

== Studios ==
- Lightspeed LA
- LightSpeed Japan Studio
- Lucid Games
- Uncapped Games
- Quantum Studio
- S Studio
- R Studio
- H Studio
- Happy Studio
- TiKi Studio
- Anyplay Studio
- LightSpeed Tech Centre
- Art Monkey Gang
- Design Monkey Gang

== Games ==
Year	Title	Platforms	Developer	Ref.
2013	Asura Online	Windows	Quantum Studio	
2014	Tencent Mahjong	iOS, Android	LightSpeed Studios	
2017	Super NBA	iOS, Android	LightSpeed Studios	
2018	PUBG: Exhilarating Battlefield	iOS, Android	LightSpeed Studios	
2018	PUBG Mobile	iOS, Android	LightSpeed Studios	
2019	Peacekeeper Elite	iOS, Android	LightSpeed Studios	
2020	PUBG Mobile Lite	iOS, Android	LightSpeed Studios	
2021	League of Legends: Wild Rift	iOS, Android	LightSpeed Studios	
2022	Apex Legends Mobile	iOS, Android	LightSpeed Studios	
2023	Undawn	iOS, Android, Windows	LightSpeed Studios	
2024	NBA Infinite	iOS, Android	LightSpeed Studios	
2025	Valorant Mobile(China Version)	İOS, Android	LightSpeed Studios	
TBA	Final Fantasy XIV Mobile	iOS, Android	LightSpeed Studios	
TBA	Code: To Jin Yong	TBA		
TBA	Untitled action game by Hideaki Itsuno	TBA	LightSpeed Japan Studio	
