= Undawn =

- Developers: Lightspeed Studios
- Publisher: Level Infinite
- Engine: Unreal Engine 4
- Platforms: Android; iOS; Windows
- Release: June 15, 2023
- Genre: Survival
- Mode: Multiplayer

Undawn is a survival game developed by Lightspeed Studios and published by Level Infinite on June 15, 2023. It is a zombie-themed game.

== Development and release ==
Undawn had more than 300 developers and was considered a "key" game developed in-house by Tencent, with an alleged budget of approximately CN¥1 billion (around US$140 million). It was first announced in March 2021. A May 2023 trailer revealed that the game would feature actor Will Smith. The game was released on June 15, 2023, for Android, iOS, and Windows. Garena published the game on June 29 for select Southeast Asia countries.

== Reception ==
Reception

Review score
Publication	Score
Pocket Gamer	3.5/5

According to a report by Reuters published on March 21, 2024, Undawn "flopped spectacularly", generating a revenue of $287,000 in the previous month, according to research firm Appmagic. Some reviewers noted that the game was relatively unheard of before the report, despite it featuring Smith.

== See also ==
- List of zombie games
