= Just Survive =

2015 video game

- Developer: Daybreak Game Company
- Publisher: Daybreak Game Company
- Producer: Chris Wynn
- Designer: Ben Jones
- Composer: Cris Velasco
- Engine: ForgeLight
- Platform: Windows
- Release: Cancelled
- Genres: Massively multiplayer online, survival
- Mode: Multiplayer

Just Survive was a survival massively multiplayer online game by Daybreak Game Company for Windows. The game, originally known as H1Z1 and later as H1Z1: Just Survive, is set during a zombie apocalypse in a rural area of the United States. In it, players attempt to survive against the natural elements such as wolves and bears, hordes of zombies, and thousands of potentially hostile survivors through interaction, scavenging for resources, building shelters, and crafting. The game was released in early access in January 2015, selling over a million copies within two months, before being discontinued in October 2018.

== Gameplay ==
The gameplay of Just Survive emphasized multiplayer cooperation, trading, and team-building. Players scavenge supplies, craft items, and build strongholds to defend against the zombie horde. The main focus of the game involved surviving against zombies through teamwork with other players, rather than having a player versus player (PvP) environment with zombies as a backdrop.

== Release ==
The game was released for Windows via Steam as an early access title on January 15, 2015. The game suffered from several issues at launch. A short-lived bug that crashed the game's servers was also introduced through a patch meant to fix other problems. The game sold over a million copies within two months.

In 2016, the game, originally known as simply H1Z1, was split into two separate projects with their own dedicated development teams, subtitled Just Survive and King of the Kill. In August 2017, the game's title dropped the H1Z1 brand name, becoming simply Just Survive. In 2018, the game was delisted from the Steam store on August 26, and its servers shut down on October 24.

== See also ==
- H1Z1
- Zombie apocalypse
- Survival game
- Massively multiplayer online game
- Player versus player
- Early access
- List of massively multiplayer online games
