= Z1 Battle Royale =

2018 video game

- Developer: Daybreak Game Company
- Publisher: Daybreak Game Company
- Producer: Chris Wynn
- Programmer: Brendan Greene
- Composer: Cris Velasco
- Engine: ForgeLight
- Platforms: Windows; PlayStation 4
- Release: Windows; February 28, 2018; PlayStation 4; August 7, 2018
- Genre: Battle royale
- Mode: Multiplayer

Z1 Battle Royale (formerly H1Z1 and King of the Kill) is a battle royale game developed and published by Daybreak Game Company. The game's development began after the original H1Z1 was spun off into two separate projects in early 2016: H1Z1: Just Survive and H1Z1: King of the Kill. The games were further split as separate projects in October 2017, with Just Survive dropping the H1Z1 name, and King of the Kill becoming simply H1Z1.

After three years of being in early access for Windows, H1Z1 officially released as a free-to-play game in February 2018, later released for the PlayStation 4 in August 2018. A month later, development of the game was transferred to NantG Mobile, who attempted to "revert" (redevelop) the game back to how it was in March 2017 (pre-Season 3), rebranding it as Z1 Battle Royale with their Season 3 update. In April 2019, development of the game was given back over to Daybreak.

== Development ==
Z1 Battle Royale was originally released on Steam's early access program on January 15, 2015, as H1Z1. Brendan “PlayerUnknown” Greene, creator of the Battle Royale mod for Arma, was brought on. At release, the game suffered from numerous technical issues, such as players reporting that they could not login to their account or enter any active server. A new bug, which made all servers go offline, was also introduced to the game after the developer released a patch to fix other problems. Despite the unstable launch, John Smedley, CEO of Daybreak Game Company, announced that the game had sold over a million copies by March 2015.

In February 2016, it was announced by Daybreak that the game had been split into two separate projects with their own dedicated development teams, with the game being rebranded as King of the Kill while the other became Just Survive. Later that year, it was announced that development of the console versions were paused in order to focus on the Windows version of the game, which was given an official release date of September 20, 2016. However, a week prior release, the game's executive producer stated that due to many features remaining unfinished by then, the game would remain in early access until further notice. As a compromise, the game received a large update on September 20, including many of the features intended for the official release.

A televised tournament for the game, titled H1Z1: Fight for the Crown, aired in April 2017 on The CW. In October 2017, it was announced that the game would be dropping its King of the Kill subtitle, becoming known as simply H1Z1. An invitational tournament was held during TwitchCon at the Long Beach Convention Center the same month. Additionally in October 2017, the "H1Z1 Pro League" was announced, which was a partnership between Daybreak Games and Twin Galaxies to create a sustainable, professional eSports league for the game.

The game was fully released out of early access on February 28, 2018, with updates to combat, gameplay, and a new gamemode known as Auto Royale. The update also launched "Season 1", introducing a new updated scoring system that rewards players who get kills and place well in matches consistently. A week after release, it was announced that the game would be going back to free-to-play. It was released in early access for the PlayStation 4 on May 22, 2018, gaining over ten million players in over a month, and was officially released on August 7, 2018. The game features a seasonal battle pass option that offers character cosmetics.

In March 2019, the game was rebranded as Z1 Battle Royale under the development of NantG Mobile. The update reverted the majority of the changes made to the game's mechanics, weapon balancing, and user interface to a build of the game from early 2017. In addition, a new mission system, as well as ranked play, including monthly tournaments between the top 75 players in a region, were added. The following month it was announced that the game's development would be handed back over to Daybreak Games, with NantG citing the "many challenges" arriving from the confusion the game caused by having both themselves and Daybreak managing the same game under two separate brands as the reason why. Just Survive would later be cancelled in October 2018.

In September 2023, Ji Ham, the CEO of Daybreak Games and Enad Global 7, announced that a redevelopment of H1Z1 is in the works. However, this will not be connected to the Battle Royale mode but rather to the previously discontinued game "Just Survive" According to Ji Ham, development is planned to begin in the first quarter of 2024, with a targeted release in 2026.

== Gameplay ==
Z1 Battle Royale is a battle royale game in which up to a hundred and fifty players compete against each other in a last man standing deathmatch. Players can choose to play solo, in a duo, or in groups of five, with the goal of being the final person or final team remaining.

Z1 Battle Royale logo

Players start each match by parachuting in from a random location above the map. Once they land, they must search for a way to defend themselves. This can take the form of anything from grabbing a weapon and actively hunting other players, to hiding while other players kill one another. Vehicles are placed throughout the world, allowing players to chase down opponents or make a quick getaway. Players can scavenge a variety of supplies from their surroundings, including weapons, equipment, and first aid kits. The game also features a crafting system that allows players to create makeshift tools, such as deconstructing scavenged items into functional bandages or body armor.

As the game progresses, a toxic gas cloud compresses the map, dealing damage to players who remain in it. This effectively makes the playable portion of the map smaller, so that players are eventually forced to confront one another in close quarters. The gas spreads in timed increments, dealing a greater degree of damage in the later stages of the match.

== Reception ==
Reception

Aggregate score
Aggregator	Score
Metacritic	(PC) 70/100 (PS4) 66/100

Review scores
Publication	Score
Game Informer	8/10
GameSpot	7/10
IGN	7/10

Z1 Battle Royale received "mixed or average" reviews according to Metacritic. By the start of 2017, the game has been a fixture in the top most played games on Steam. Although it predated Fortnite and PUBG: Battlegrounds in the Battle Royale genre, the game has not been able to maintain its position, ultimately losing a significant portion of the playerbase.

The game has been experiencing large number of bugs since 2015, which has led to many users leaving the game for other battle royale titles. In August 2017, a Combat Update which changed spray patterns for many of the weapons and tweaked movement has been released which also resulted in backlash from the game's users.

The game has also taken a hit due to multiple unscheduled server downtime occurrences caused either by DDoS attacks or server strain.
