= PlayerUnknown =

Irish video game developer (born 1976)

Brendan Greene
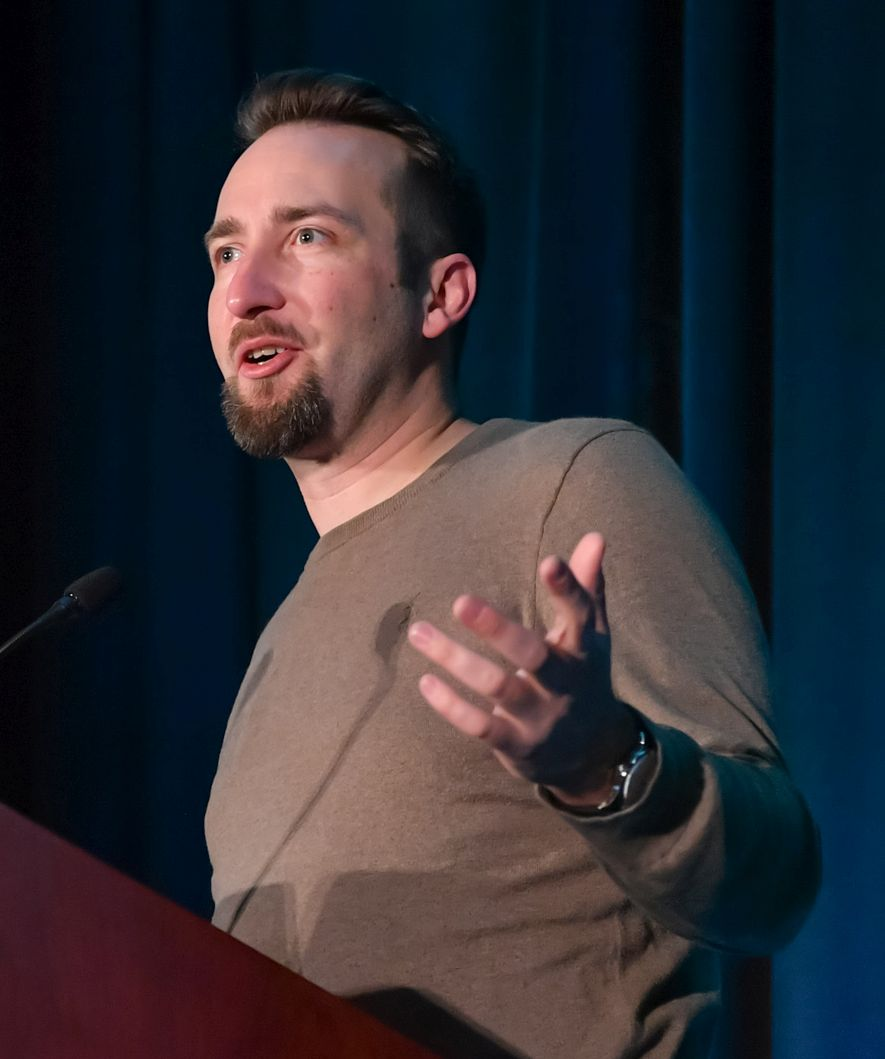
- Greene in 2018
- Born: March 1976 (age 50); Ballyshannon, Ireland
- Other name: PlayerUnknown
- Occupations: Video game designer, video game director
- Known for: PUBG: Battlegrounds

Brendan Greene (born 29 March 1976), better known as PlayerUnknown, is an Irish video game developer. He is best known for his work on the battle royale video game PUBG: Battlegrounds. He left active development on the game to form PUBG Special Projects and PlayerUnknown Productions in March 2019.

== Career ==
In 2013, Greene was living in Brazil as an event photographer and freelance website designer. While saving up money to buy a plane ticket back to Ireland, he found himself playing video games, particularly the open world survival DayZ mod for Arma 2. He modded the game himself, working under the pseudonym "PlayerUnknown". After experimenting with last-man-standing gameplay, later that year he released a mod called DayZ: Battle Royale, named after the 2000 Japanese action film Battle Royale.

=== PlayerUnknown's Battle Royale (Arma 3 mod) ===
After the release of Arma 3, Greene started working on a modification for the game, named PlayerUnknown's Battle Royale. The mod followed the same last-man standing principle of the Battle Royale DayZ mod, while introducing features like the airplane that dropped players across a wider terrain and an online leaderboard.

=== H1Z1: Battle Royale ===
After DayZ: Battle Royale and PlayerUnknown's Battle Royale achieved success, Greene was recruited by Sony Online Entertainment as an advisor for the development of a battle royale game mode for H1Z1, recreating the basic elements of DayZ: Battle Royale. H1Z1 released into early access in 2015 with a battle royale mode now known as Z1 Battle Royale.

=== PlayerUnknown's Battlegrounds ===
In 2016, H1Z1: King of the Kill caught the attention of South Korean game company Krafton, which reached out to Greene about creating his own game based on his previous work. Greene moved to Korea to join Krafton as a game designer, working on the game that became PlayerUnknown's Battlegrounds, which Greene described as "that sort of final realization of my vision".

=== PUBG Special Projects / PlayerUnknown Productions ===
In March 2019, Greene left development at PUBG and moved to Amsterdam to form PUBG Special Projects. His goal was to develop and release a trilogy of games: Preface (released), Prologue (under development), and Artemis.

==== Preface and Prologue ====
In December 2019, Greene announced a new game called Prologue under a new studio PlayerUnknown Productions, described as "an exploration of new technologies and gameplay."

Greene announced in August 2021 that he was leaving Krafton while maintaining his PlayerUnknown Productions in Amsterdam. He stated that the studio would not work on the battle royale genre but something more experimental. The new studio continued work on the Prologue game.

On 5 December 2024, PlayerUnknown Productions released Preface on Steam. It was described as "an immersive tech demo showcasing Melba", an engine developed in-house.

Playerunknown Productions went bankrupt on 19 August 2026.

==== Artemis ====
Artemis is intended to be "the culmination of in-house technology that could host millions of players inside large-scale worlds at once."
