= The Photograph =

The Photograph may refer to:

- The Photograph (2007 film), an Indonesian film
- The Photograph (2020 film), an American romantic drama film
- The Photograph (novel), a 2003 novel by Penelope Lively

== See also ==
- Photograph (disambiguation)
