= Prunty =

Prunty is the surname of the following people:

- Ben Prunty, American composer
- Bryan Prunty (born 1983), Scottish football striker
- Joe Prunty, American basketball coach
- Karon Prunty (born 2001), American football player
- Melinda Gibbons Prunty (born 1957), American politician
- Robert Prunty, American football coach
- Wyatt Prunty (born 1947), American poet

== See also ==
- Prunty, West Virginia, an unincorporated community in the U.S.
