= StarCrawlers =

2017 video game

- Developer: Juggernaut Games
- Publisher: Juggernaut Games
- Composer: Ben Prunty
- Engine: Unity
- Platforms: Microsoft Windows, OS X, SteamOS
- Release: WW: 24 May 2017
- Genre: Role-playing
- Mode: Single-player

StarCrawlers is a dungeon crawler and role-playing game that was released for Windows, macOS, and SteamOS on 24 May 2017. It was the first game produced by Juggernaut Games, which funded it using a Kickstarter. It is set in a sci-fi universe with cyberpunk elements, and features a mixture of pre-built and procedurally generated content. The game aims to revitalise dungeon-crawlers as a genre, billing itself as a "modern take on a classic cRPG dungeon crawler", and is available on Steam or GOG.

== Plot ==
The player begins the game by docking with STIX (Station Terminus IX), a space station that later forms the game's hub; the player then begins a practice "crawl" to prove their mettle. From there, they take on a variety of missions set by mega-corporations, such as stealing goods, spying on rivals, and assassinating people.

== Gameplay ==
StarCrawlers is a dungeon crawler that features a first-person perspective and a turn-based combat system. The game revolves around STIX, where "missions" are assigned and players can rest and buy equipment. These missions make up the dungeon-crawling portion of the game and are divided into procedurally-generated missions and pre-made missions that advance the story; the procedurally-generated missions make up a large majority. While combat is turn-based, non-combat gameplay, such as puzzles, takes place in real-time. The combat is based on a "time-unit" system, where different actions take up different amounts of time units; it also can involve up to four player characters (though you start the game with only one), each which has a different set of skills; these are dictated by their character class, but a player can choose different skills within a given class. A faction system based around maintaining different corporations also exists.

== Development ==
Juggernaut Games was founded in 2011. They announced StarCrawlers on December 9, 2013, and began a Kickstarter campaign on February 12, 2014. The campaign reached its goal of $65,000 on March 1, and finished on March 14 with $100,278 raised. They also utilised Steam Greenlight to get the game on Steam; they were greenlit on February 19. After the Kickstarter campaign, they focused on adding new content, before launching a backer beta on January 28, 2015. This was followed by the game being released on Steam Early Access on March 17. Development was interrupted by the decision to upgrade to Unity 5, mainly due to Unity 4's memory limitations. This process began in September 2016 and was finished by December 2016, which allowed for a planned release on May 16, 2017. Because of a need for further polishing, it was delayed until later that month. After the May 23 release, Juggernaut Games committed to further development.

The game's music was composed by Ben Prunty, who also composed the music for FTL: Faster Than Light.

== Reception ==
Fraser Brown of Rock Paper Shotgun said he eventually grew bored of the game's procedurally generated levels, but StarCrawlers "manages to capture the essence of cyberpunk and turn it into compelling systems".
