= Photograph (disambiguation) =

A photograph is an image created by the effect of light on a light-sensitive material.

Photograph or photo may also refer to:

== Films ==
- Photo (2006 film), an Indian Telugu-language romantic thriller film
- The Photograph (2007 film), an Indonesian film
- Photograph (film), a 2019 Indian-American film by Ritesh Batra
- The Photograph (2020 film), an American romantic drama
- Photo (2023 film), an Indian Kannada-language drama film

== Music ==
- The Photos, a British power pop act of the early 1980s

=== Albums ===
- Photograph: The Very Best of Ringo Starr
- Photographs (Patrick Sky album), 1969
- Photograph (Melanie album), 1976
- Photographs (Casiopea album), 1983
- Photographs (Andrew Osenga album), 2002
- Photographs (Mest album), 2005
- Photographs (EP), by Lakes, 2006
- Photograph, by Ariel Rivera, 1995
- Photograph, by Jani Lane, 2007
- Photographs, by The Aston Shuffle

=== Songs ===
- "Photograph" (Antônio Carlos Jobim song), 1959
- "Photograph" (Def Leppard song), 1983
- "Photograph" (Ed Sheeran song), 2015
- "Photograph" (J. Cole song), 2018
- "Photograph" (Nickelback song), 2005
- "Photograph" (Ringo Starr song), 1973
- "Photograph" (The Verve Pipe song), 1996
- "Photograph" (Weezer song), 2001
- "Photographs", by Janis Ian from Night Rains
- "Photographs", by Eddie Vedder from the soundtrack album Into the Wild
- "Photo", by Ryan Cabrera from the album You Stand Watching
- "Photo", by Karan Shembi from the film Luka Chuppi
- "Photograph", by The Outfield from the album Any Time Now
- "Photograph", by R.E.M. featuring Natalie Merchant from the album Born to Choose
- "Photograph", by Frog from the album Kind of Blah
- "Photographs", by Rihanna from the album Rated R

== Printed media ==
- Photo (American magazine), a men's magazine, published during the 1950s
- Photo (French magazine), about photography, published since 1967
- Photograph (book), a 2013 photography book by Ringo Starr
- The Photograph (novel), a 2003 novel by Penelope Lively

== Software ==
- Photos (Apple), photo management software included in MacOS
- Photos (Windows), photo management software included in Microsoft Windows
- Google Photos, a photo sharing and storage service by Google

== Other uses ==
- Digital photography, uses digital technology to capture an image electronically
- Photographs (video game), a 2019 puzzle game by British developer Luca Redwood
- photo-, the Greek prefix denoting light beams

== See also ==
- Photographer (disambiguation)
