= Mightier =

American video game company

- Industry: Behavioral Health
- Founded: 2016; 10 years ago
- Headquarters: Boston Massachusetts, United States
- Key people: Dr. Jason Kahn, (Chief Science Officer), Craig Lund, (CEO), Trevor Stricker, (Co-Founder)
- Website: mightier.com

Mightier is an American company which produces a bio-responsive video game platform, also called Mightier, that helps children learn to manage their emotions.

== History ==
Mightier was developed and tested at Boston Children's Hospital and Harvard Medical School to give kids a safe place to practice emotional regulation, develop coping skills, and build the emotional muscle memory they need to respond to life's challenges.

It began as a research program at Boston Children's Hospital in 2009 and became the independent entity, Neuromotion Labs in 2014. The Mighteor product was released in 2017, and renamed Mightier in 2018. The program is highly regarded by parents for children with autism, ADHD, ADD, ODD, anxiety, and other emotional regulation challenges.

The company works with popular video game developers to add the Mightier emotional learning layer to the games to keep kids engaged and learning. To date, more than 2.5 million games have been played with Mightier.

=== Funding ===
The company is funded by tech based foundations and has raised $30 million in venture financing and closed a series B in 2021 with participation from Sony Innovation Fund, DigiTX and PBJ Capital.

== Services ==
Mightier offers a library of biofeedback mobile video games and shared family activities to help kids 6-12 build the skill of emotional regulation.

=== Games ===
- Air Hockey
- Brick Breaker
- Crossy Ninja
- Flying Ace
- Gelato Flicker
- Hibachi Hero
- Hundreds
- Kitty in the Box
- Mama Hawk
- Mini Metro
- Peko Peko Sushi
- Race the Sun
- Return of Invaders
- Robo Runner
- Rocat Jumpurr
- Rooms of Doom
- Runaway Toad
- Space Invasion
- Spiral Bound
- Super Best Ghost Game
- Tiki Taka Soccer
- Train Conductor World
- Tumblestone
- Unpossible
- Whip Swing
- You Must Build a Boat
- Zombie Fall

== Awards and recognition ==
- 2010 - Milton Foundation
- 2012 - Deborah Monroe Foundation
- 2014 - Boston Children’s Hospital IDHA Grant
- 2016 - MassChallenge Finalist
- 2018 - Eco-Excellence Awards: Best App
- 2022 - National Parenting Product Award

== See also ==
- Video game development
- Video game
- History of video games
- Outline of video games
