= Erin Robinson =

Canadian indie game designer and developer

Erin Robinson Swink
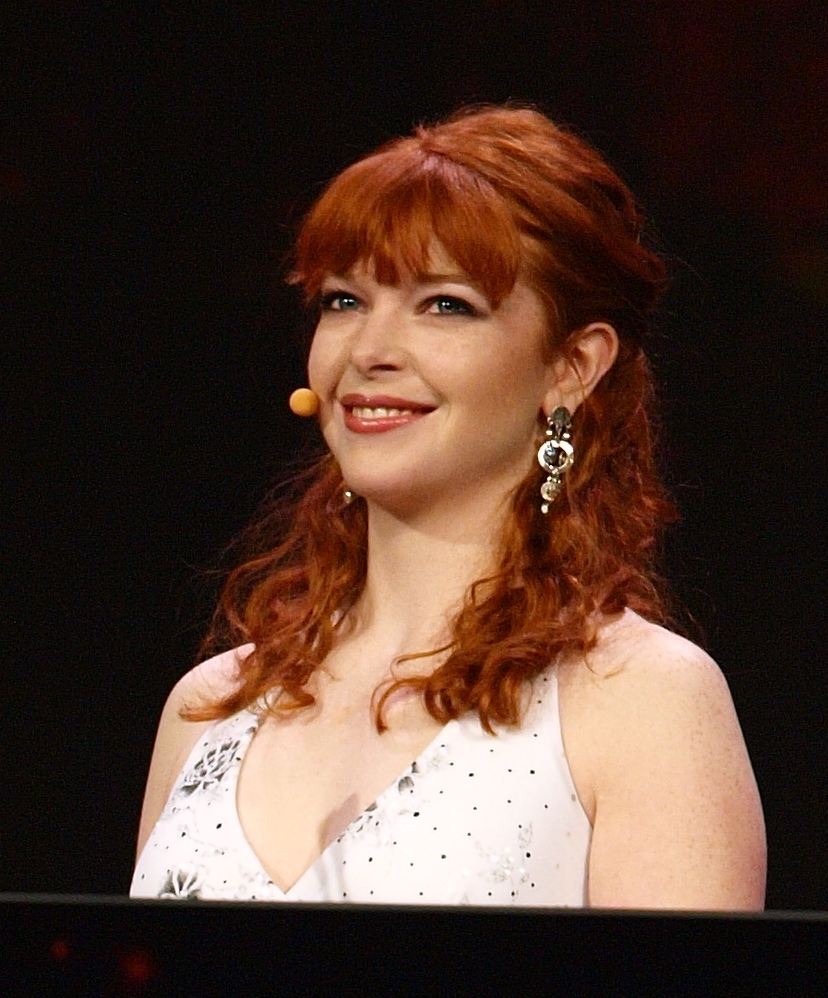
- Erin Robinson at the 2010 Game Developers Conference
- Occupations: Video game designer and developer
- Notable work: Gravity Ghost (2015)

Erin Robinson Swink is a Canadian indie game designer and developer. In 2011, Fast Company named her one of the most influential women in technology. In 2015, University of California, Santa Cruz appointed her creative director of the Baskin School of Engineering's master's programme in games and playable media. She later joined Dutch game developer Guerrilla Games as a senior quest designer.

== Personal life and education ==
Erin Robinson is originally from Toronto. She was raised in Markham, Ontario, until she was 10 years old. The first game she ever purchased was The Lost Mind of Dr. Brain (1994). She earned money for the game by doing household chores as a child, remarking later that "maybe associating video games with chores was the reason I became a developer." She also played Myst and King's Quest VII. Robinson has a bachelor's degree in psychology from Queen's University in Kingston, Ontario. Her college thesis was on spatial memory and the translation of experience into memory. She worked as a research assistant at a psychology lab. Unhappy with her work, she eventually quit to become a game developer. She has been inspired by the work of Marjane Satrapi, particularly her graphic novel Persepolis. She lives in Chicago, Illinois. She is firm supporter of the fight against climate change, and has called for video game companies to divest their investments in fossil fuel companies.

== Work ==
Robinson worked from home as an independent video game developer under her own indie game label "Ivy Games." She started in 2005. The first game she ever designed, Spooks, was about a dead girl who tries to save a goldfish. The game was designed on Microsoft Paint. When she first started designing video games, she kept it a secret from her friends because she thought it was "super geeky." She developed the concept, mechanics, and artwork, and hired computer programmers to code the game logic. Many of her games have a retro design feel. Her early games were released as freeware. These freeware games included Spooks, Little Girl in Underland, and Nanobots. Her first paid gig in video games was in 2007, when she did done artwork for Blackwell Unbound. She has released two independently funded games: Puzzle Bots, a point and click puzzle adventure game, and Gravity Ghost, a game about a ghost girl on a mission to save the galaxy. In the game Gravity Ghost she experimented with alternative forms of game story-telling, which allows the player to learn how to navigate the fictional world as the same rate as the character. She has stressed the importance of the introspective journey to this particular game. A PlayStation 4 version of Gravity Ghost was released in 2019.

Robinson has taught indie gaming classes at Columbia College Chicago. She was named one of the most influential women in technology, in 2011, by Fast Company. She has spoken at Game Developers Conference about video games being used in neuroscience as rehabilitative therapy. She talked about her findings that video games are increasingly being used in medical and rehabilitative therapy and that playing First-Person Shooters improves visual and auditory perception. In 2015, she was named the creative director of the master's degree programme in games and playable media at the Silicon Valley Center of the University of California, Santa Cruz. She later joined Dutch game developer Guerrilla Games, known for the Killzone and Horizon games, as a senior quest designer.
