= Photographs (video game) =

2019 video game

- Developer: EightyEightGames
- Publisher: EightyEightGames
- Designer: Luca Redwood
- Artist: Octavi Navarro
- Composer: Ben Prunty
- Platforms: Microsoft Windows, macOS, Linux, iOS, Android
- Release: Windows, iOS; April 3, 2019 macOS, Linux, Android; 2019
- Genre: Puzzle game
- Mode: Single-player

Photographs is a puzzle game by British developer Luca Redwood under EightyEightGames, released for iOS and Microsoft Windows devices in April 2019.

== Gameplay ==
Photographs is composed of five narrative-driven stories that each involve a decision that the story's lead character comes to regret. Each story iterates between two phases: first, focusing a virtual camera viewfinder on the object in the given scene that matches a text description, and then once located, performing a mini-game with rules that are unique to each story. After completing the mini-game, additional story elements are given via way of photographs and changing scene elements before the player seeks out the next photo to locate. Once they reach the end of the story, they may then start on another character's story; the first time through the game, the player must complete the characters in a specific order, but afterwards can revisit any character's story. Each story's puzzle elements do change along with the story, reflecting the difficulty of the lead character of the story; for example in the Alchemist, the player has to figure out how to simultaneously move figures representing the grandfather and his granddaughter around the board, but as she becomes ill within the narrative, her movement becomes much more limited in the puzzle.

Once the player has completed all five stories, the five characters that made hard decisions pleads to a mirror, which shows the player via the device's camera or webcam, each begging to be allowed to go back in time to change their decision. The player is given two of the characters and must decide which one they feel deserves a second chance. After several of these questions, one character will have been chosen by the player the most frequently, and the game's credits are shown alongside the narrative of the character if they had made a different decision.

One of "The Alchemist" puzzle games, requiring the player to slide both the grandfather and granddaughter into their specific slots while avoiding obstacles

- The Alchemist involves an elderly potion maker living with his granddaughter. One day, his granddaughter as well as her cat is infected by a toxic plant that dulls her senses and makes her seemingly lifeless. He finds a potential antidote which his gives to the cat first, finding its life coming back, physically healthy but mentally acting strange, but proceeds to give it to his granddaughter. The granddaughter's health is restored but soon becomes delusional and commits suicide.
- The Athlete is one of three girls on a dive team. They help each other to improve but seem to reach a ceiling. The main character realizes that it is her diving performance that is dragging the others down. When she sees that the others have taken performance-enhancing drugs, she decides to do the same, and soon surpasses and reaches exceptional high scores. This only draws attention to her, and her use of drugs is soon discovered. She is kicked off the team, and her life is ruined.
- The Jailor is a member of a native tribe. The tribe soon meet settlers who are initially pleased to her their stories and help them learn new technologies. However, the settlers soon decide to take the land, crops and other resources of the tribe as their own. Those members of the tribe that fight back are jailed. The lead character, who has not challenged the settlers, is presented with the opportunity to be the jailor for their prisoners, which he accepts. While the position gives him an opportunity to free his tribe and end their suffering, he becomes to complicate in his duties since the settlers also feed them. With a major drought, the settlers force the tribesman to shoot and kill his former tribemembers or otherwise be killed himself. Too late to save everyone, he kills one of the settlers before they turn and kill him and his former leader.
- The Writer is the editor of a newspaper started by his grandfather that aimed to publish only uplifting stories. However, in the decades since, the newspaper's subscribers have tumbled, and the son has to let nearly all of his staff go and sell other assets to keep some business afloat. Observing that papers that tell more negative news sell far more than his, he starts to write more heated, negative stories. This does help to revitalize the paper, but it also angers a lot of its readers. Events led to a disgruntled reader to blow up the newspaper building, killing the editor.
- The Protector is a member of a special group of wizards that can travel through time to stop certain bad things from happening. As it is a difficult job, only she and one other Protector remain after training before the current Protector retires. The two become close and eventually decide to have a child. Before their child is born, the main character ends up seeing the death of their son by a drunk driver some years in the future; she does not tell her partner about this. After their son is born, the main character goes to stop people dying in a burning building and sees the driver that will kill their son as one of those; she traps him in the building to die. Her actions are discovered, and she and her partner are dismissed and imprisoned, while their son is stripped from them.

== Development ==
Photographs is the third game by Luca Redwood, following 10000000 and You Must Build a Boat. Music for the game was composed by Ben Prunty, while Redwood outsourced the pixel-style art to Octavi Navarro who had previously worked on Thimbleweed Park.

Redwood announced Photographs in December 2017, and the game was formally released for iOS and Windows on April 3, 2019, with plans for a macOS, Linux, and Android version to soon follow.

== Reception ==
=== Awards ===
The game was nominated for "Best Mobile Game" at the Develop:Star Awards, and for "Game, Puzzle" at the NAVGTR Awards.
