= Into the Breach =

2018 turn-based strategy video game

- Developer: Subset Games
- Publishers: Subset Games; Netflix (iOS and Android)
- Designers: Jay Ma; Matthew Davis
- Writer: Chris Avellone
- Composer: Ben Prunty
- Platforms: Microsoft Windows; macOS; Nintendo Switch; Linux; Stadia; iOS; Android
- Release: Microsoft Windows February 27, 2018; macOS August 9, 2018; Nintendo Switch August 28, 2018; Linux April 20, 2020; Stadia December 1, 2020; iOS, Android July 19, 2022
- Genre: Turn-based strategy
- Mode: Single-player

Into the Breach is a turn-based strategy video game developed and published by indie studio Subset Games, consisting of Jay Ma and Matthew Davis. Into the Breach is their second game, following FTL: Faster Than Light. It features writing by Chris Avellone and music composed by Ben Prunty. It was released for Microsoft Windows in February 2018, for macOS and Nintendo Switch in August 2018, and for Linux in April 2020. A version for iOS and Android mobile devices was published by Netflix in July 2022.

== Gameplay ==
Into the Breach is set in the far future where humanity fights against an army of giant monsters collectively called the Vek. To combat them, the player controls pilots that operate giant mechs that can be equipped with a variety of weapons, armor, and other equipment. The game uses a turn-based combat system, allowing the player to coordinate the actions of their team in response to enemy moves and actions that serve to telegraph their attacks.

In combat, the player controls three different mechs against the Vek, and will be given an objective for that map along with a fixed number of turns to complete that objective. The principal goal for any map is to protect civilian structures which support the power grid that supports the mechs, but additional objectives may be presented. Should a civilian structure be damaged or destroyed, the power grid is weakened. On each turn, Vek forces will move across the board and attack. The player is shown the direction of the Vek unit's intended attack and information on the number of moves the Vek unit is able to take and its remaining health are available on screen. The appearance of new Vek follows each turn. This gives the player the ability to then move each mech and fire one of its weapons as to either defeat the Vek unit, push the Vek off a line of attack, avoid an attack, intercept newly spawning Vek or an attack on civilian structures. Mechs can only take a limited amount of damage during battle before becoming inoperable, though a player can have a mech idle a turn to repair some damage; battle damage is otherwise completely repaired between maps. Pilots of mechs that defeat a Vek gain experience points, which then unlock new skills. The gameplay of Into the Breach has been compared to that of chess, as it is less about overpowering the opposing forces and instead about maintaining position control and sacrificing units to gain a larger advantage; this comparison is further enforced by the grid structure of combat scenarios, where fights are broken into 8x8 squares.

Each battle takes place on a 8x8 field.

Similar to FTL, the game is broken into a sequence of islands each with a number of scenarios (based on island sectors) to complete; while the islands remain the same each game, the scenarios themselves are generated procedurally in a roguelike manner based on preset maps. After completing the first island, the player is given the choice of which islands in the sequence to protect next; islands have various conditions that can affect combat scenarios, and more hazardous conditions can gain greater rewards from completing the scenarios on each. Should the player lose any scenario, either due to their three mechs becoming disabled, losing their power grid, or failing to protect a specific target for that scenario, then the player has the option to send one of the pilots back in time prior to the start of the first mission – effectively starting a new game – retaining their current experience and abilities to give an edge in the next battle. Reviewers for the website Rock Paper Shotgun described the gameplay as a mix of Pacific Rim and Edge of Tomorrow due to the time-traveling elements. Other permanent improvements, such as new pilots or sets of mechs, become available as the player completes various milestones.

== Development ==
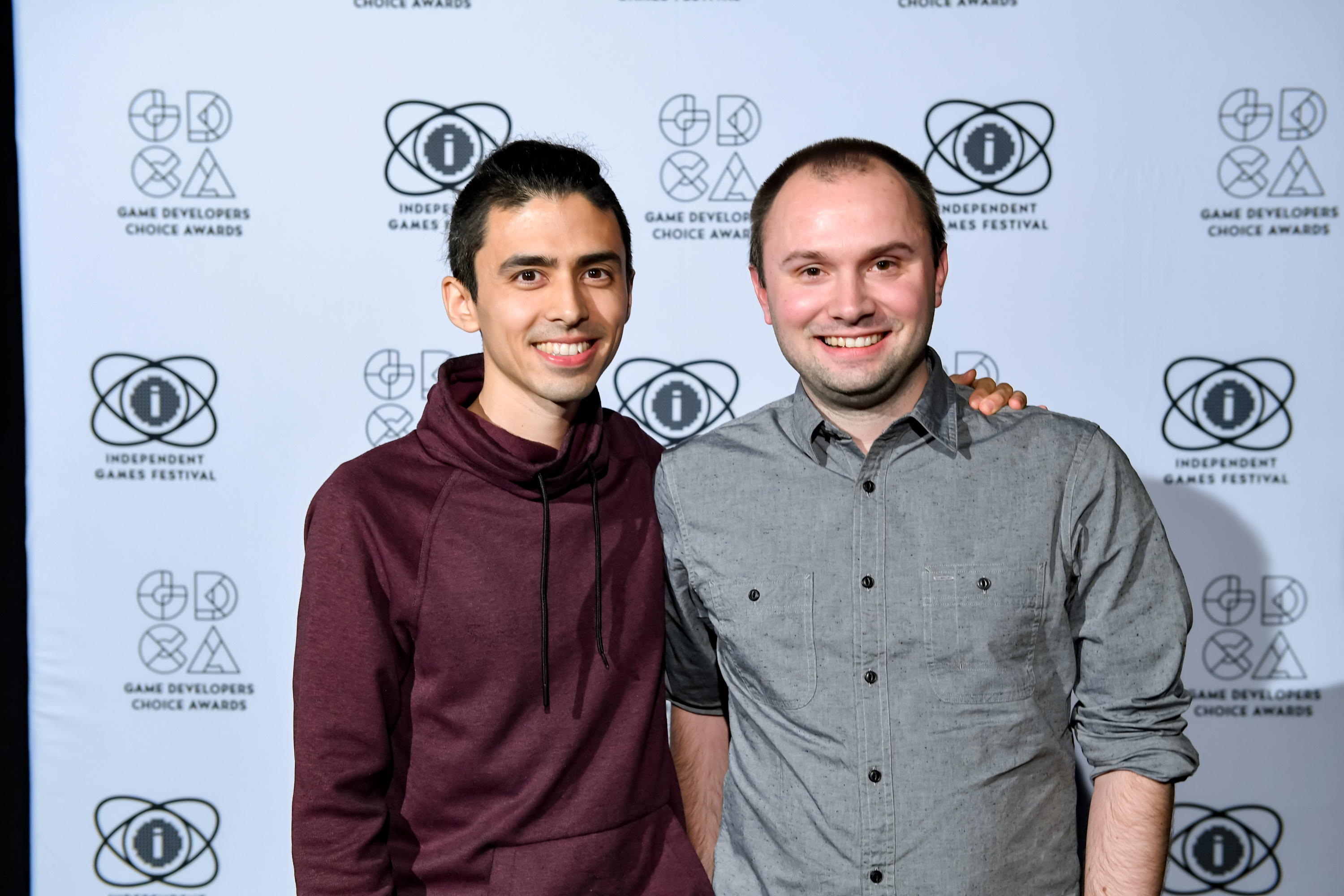
Jay Ma (left) and Matthew Davis at the 2019 Game Developers Choice Awards

Into the Breach came out of ideas that Ma and Davis had following the success of FTL. They had tried various prototypes for a game, including one for a grid-based tactical system, which they recognized was seeing a resurgence in the video game industry due to the success of XCOM: Enemy Unknown (2012). However, they still needed some type of hook to differentiate their game. This came as a response to films like Man of Steel and Pacific Rim, where "the whole city gets demolished, but no one cares because the good guys won", according to Ma. They set about to make the game focus on the impact of collateral damage so that defending buildings and other structures would become a priority rather than just winning.

Subset included the effects of giant mechs-vs-giant alien battles on the landscape as the game time progress, with mountains being torn down, forests destroyed by fire, and buildings razed. To emphasize this in gameplay, they include the mechanic that mechs are powered from local power nodes in the buildings, so that if these buildings are destroyed, they may not be able to power their mechs. This created tough decisions for players, such as whether to destroy a building to get a short-term edge in battle or to prevent a catastrophe to a larger number of buildings. To further help emphasize the need to care for these buildings, Avellone's story was written to remind the player that as they fight with the mechs, there will be people cowering for safety in these buildings, and to create emotional impact when these people are killed when a building is destroyed.

In contrast to XCOM, where a simple battle may take up to an hour to complete all objectives, Subset wanted each battle to be relatively short in terms of gameplay time. The limited turn counter was used to keep battles short, and Subset found that telegraphing the Vek's movements further helped to hasten the pace. They developed scenarios and situations to require the player to devise new strategies on the fly which they anticipated that players would build upon in later parts of the game.

Development of Into the Breach started mid-2015, after all of Subset's commitments to FTL were completed, providing them with the financial security to move forward onto this project. The game, announced in February 2017, was expected to be released on Microsoft Windows, macOS, and Linux operating systems, though Subset did not expect this to be a simultaneous release. Subset said at the time of its reveal that Into the Breach was still a ways off from release, as they had enough in place to show off the game's ideas and preliminary art, but they still lack a lot of content for the game, and prefer to perfect the game at their own pace. Rock Paper Shotgun considered an early preview copy they had played in November 2017 as nearly complete outside of art assets and game balance issues, and reported that the game is expected to release in early 2018, and was eventually set for February 27, 2018.

In addition to Avellone and Prunty, Subset Games has obtained help from Isla Schanuel for community management and user testing, Power Up Audio for audio work, and Polina Hristova to assist Ma in art assets. Ben Prunty, who had composed the FTL soundtrack, provided the music for Into the Breach. Like with FTL, Prunty and Subset wanted to use a style of music not normally associated with the narrative genre, but had difficulty in deciding which direction it should go, particularly that they felt that music for a strategy game should be soft and quiet. Ma shared with Prunty 2Cellos' take on Hans Zimmer's "Mombasa" from Inception: Music from the Motion Picture, which gave Prunty the inspiration to create the game's first music track, used in the game's teaser trailer. In addition to the digital score, Prunty added some guitar riffs atop the music, creating a motif that appeared throughout the tracks. Further, Prunty helped Subset to determine when music should be used in the game; rather than music playing constantly, he suggested to have music only start when the player completes the deployment of the mechs on a map, creating a dynamic for the game going forward.

The Windows version of Into the Breach was released on February 27, 2018. The macOS version followed later that year on August 9, 2018. The Nintendo Switch version followed later that month on August 28, 2018. A native Linux version was released on April 20, 2020.

A free Advanced Edition update to the game was released on July 19, 2022, for personal computers and Switch versions, adding more content including new squads, pilots and enemies, and an "Unfair" difficulty level. Additionally, a mobile version for iOS and Android was released the same day by Netflix.

== Reception ==
Reception

Aggregate score
Aggregator	Score
Metacritic	PC: 90/100; NS: 89/100

Review scores
Publication	Score
Edge	9/10
Game Informer	9.25/10
GameSpot	10/10
IGN	9/10

Into the Breach received praise upon its release, holding a 90 out of 100 on review aggregation site Metacritic and is the site's best reviewed PC game for 2018. Critics lauded the simple but strategic gameplay, high difficulty, artstyle and soundtrack. The editors of Popular Mechanics named it the best video game of 2018, writing that it "is a refreshing take on the turn-based strategy game and represents the most inventive evolution of the genre."

=== Accolades ===
The game was a runner-up for "Best Debut" and "Best Game of the Year" in Giant Bomb's 2018 Game of the Year Awards.

Year	Award	Category	Result	Ref.
2018	Independent Games Festival Competition Awards	Seumas McNally Grand Prize	Nominated	
2018	Independent Games Festival Competition Awards	Excellence in Design	Nominated	
2018	Golden Joystick Awards	Best Indie Game	Nominated	
2018	Golden Joystick Awards	PC Game of the Year	Nominated	
2018	Golden Joystick Awards	Ultimate Game of the Year	Nominated	
2018	The Game Awards 2018	Best Independent Game	Nominated	
2018	The Game Awards 2018	Best Strategy Game	Won	
2018	Gamers' Choice Awards	Fan Favorite Indie Game	Nominated	
2018	Titanium Awards	Best Indie Game	Nominated	
2018	Titanium Awards	Best Game Design	Nominated	
2018	Australian Games Awards	Strategy Title of the Year	Nominated	
2019	New York Game Awards	Off Broadway Award for Best Indie Game	Nominated	
2019	22nd Annual D.I.C.E. Awards	Game of the Year	Nominated	
2019	22nd Annual D.I.C.E. Awards	Strategy/Simulation Game of the Year	Won	
2019	22nd Annual D.I.C.E. Awards	Outstanding Achievement for an Independent Game	Nominated	
2019	22nd Annual D.I.C.E. Awards	Outstanding Achievement in Game Design	Nominated	
2019	National Academy of Video Game Trade Reviewers Awards	Design, New IP	Nominated	
2019	National Academy of Video Game Trade Reviewers Awards	Game, Strategy	Nominated	
2019	National Academy of Video Game Trade Reviewers Awards	Original Light Mix Score, New IP	Nominated	
2019	SXSW Gaming Awards	Excellence in Design	Nominated	
2019	Game Developers Choice Awards	Best Design	Won	
2019	15th British Academy Games Awards	Game Design	Nominated	
2019	15th British Academy Games Awards	Original Property	Won	
2019	Italian Video Game Awards	Best Indie Game	Nominated	
