= Subnautica =

2018 video game

- Developer: Unknown Worlds Entertainment (Note: Console versions co-developed by Panic Button)
- Publisher: Unknown Worlds Entertainment (Note: Physical versions published by Gearbox Publishing)
- Director: Charlie Cleveland
- Producer: Hugh Jeremy
- Designer: Charlie Cleveland
- Programmers: Charlie Cleveland; Steven An; Max McGuire; Jonas Bötel
- Artists: Cory Strader; Brian Cummings; Scott MacDonald
- Writer: Tom Jubert
- Composer: Simon Chylinski
- Engine: Unity
- Platforms: macOS; Windows; PlayStation 4; Xbox One; Nintendo Switch; PlayStation 5; Xbox Series X/S; iOS; Android; Nintendo Switch 2
- Release: macOS, Windows; January 23, 2018; PS4, Xbox One; December 4, 2018; NS, PS5, Series X/S; May 14, 2021; iOS, Android; July 8, 2025; Nintendo Switch 2; February 17, 2026
- Genres: Action-adventure, survival
- Mode: Single-player

Subnautica is a 2018 action-adventure survival game developed and published by Unknown Worlds Entertainment. The player controls Ryley Robinson, a survivor of a spaceship crash on an alien oceanic planet, which they are free to explore. The main objectives are to find essential resources, survive the local flora and fauna, and find a way to escape the planet.

Subnautica was released in early access for Windows in December 2014, macOS in June 2015, and Xbox One in May 2016. The game was released out of early access in January 2018 for macOS and Windows, with versions for PlayStation 4 and Xbox One in December 2018. The physical console versions were published by Gearbox Publishing. The Nintendo Switch, PlayStation 5, and Xbox Series X/S versions were released in May 2021, A Nintendo Switch 2 version was released in February 2026. It received generally positive reviews from critics and sold over 5 million copies by January 2020.

A spin-off, Subnautica: Below Zero, which was originally meant to be downloadable content for the base game, was released in May 2021. A direct sequel, Subnautica 2, was released on May 14th, 2026 in early access.

== Gameplay ==
Players can command submersibles to explore the game's ocean planet.

Subnautica is a survival action-adventure game set in an open world environment and played from a first-person perspective. The player controls one of the few survivors of the crashed spacecraft known as The Aurora, Ryley Robinson, as he is stranded on a remote ocean planet known as 4546B.

The main objective is to explore the ocean of the alien planet and survive its dangers while completing tasks to advance the plot. Players can collect resources and blueprints, construct tools, build bases and submersibles, and interact with the planet's wildlife.

The majority is mostly set underwater, with two explorable islands, and a simulated day-and-night cycle that affects visibility, along with an eclipse that happens frequently. Upon beginning a new game, players are given an option between four difficulty modes:

- In survival mode, the player manages their depleting health, hunger, thirst and oxygen. If the player dies, they respawn, but certain items are removed from their inventory.
- In freedom mode, gameplay is near-identical to that of survival mode, but without hunger and thirst.
- In hardcore mode, gameplay includes permanent death. If the player dies, they do not respawn, and its save file is instead permanently deleted. Additionally, the player does not receive warnings of low oxygen levels as in other modes.
- In creative mode, all depleting characteristics, such as health and thirst, are removed. All blueprints are unlocked, allowing players to craft without the need for resources. Additionally, the player starts with a stasis rifle, a Seaglide, a mobile vehicle bay, and a propulsion cannon. All items, base structures, and vehicles do not require an energy source to operate, and vehicles are immune to crush depth.

The game supports VR headsets, such as the HTC Vive and the Oculus Rift, with the additional inputs of a keyboard and mouse or game controller.

== Plot ==
Roughly 1,000 years prior to the game's events, an alien race known as "the Architects", also known as the "precursors", begins investigation of the ocean planet 4546B for a cure to the Kharaa bacterium, which has devastated their civilization. They discover that the Sea Emperor Leviathan species naturally produces "Enzyme 42" in its digestive tract, which makes the species immune to the bacterium. The last of the species is too old to produce the enzyme in sufficient quantities, and attempts to force its eggs to hatch (to extract the enzyme from her young) are unsuccessful. As the Architects grow desperate for a cure, they attempt to extract the enzyme from a related species, specifically the Sea Dragon Leviathan. This leads them to abduct a Sea Dragon egg for research. Following the abduction, an adult Sea Dragon Leviathan attacks the research facility where the egg is being held in an effort to retrieve it. This attack causes the facility to collapse to the sea floor, resulting in the Kharaa bacterium being released into the ocean. With the situation worsening, and the containment breach inadvertently infecting the ocean with the Kharaa bacterium, the Architects place 4546B under quarantine while forcing the remaining Architects to upload their consciousnesses onto cache data hubs.

Centuries later, the spaceship Degasi crashes on 4546B while scanning it for minerals. Three of its crew members survive for a few months on the planet. 10 years later, the Alterra Corporation's spaceship Aurora crash-lands on 4546B while attempting to locate the wreck of Degasi. The player character Ryley Robinson, who is the Non-Essential Systems Maintenance Chief, is among those of the Aurora crew to eject in escape pods. He is knocked unconscious during atmospheric entry, and finds himself to be the sole survivor by the time he wakes up. He is contacted by the trading ship Sunbeam, responding to the Aurora's SOS. When the Sunbeam attempts to rescue Ryley, it is shot down. Ryley investigates and discovers that the weapon responsible is the Architects' Quarantine Enforcement Platform, and that it will continue to shoot down any ship it detects attempting to enter or exit the planet's atmosphere, to prevent the spread of Kharaa. Ryley attempts to disable the weapon; the control panel detects he is infected with Kharaa and, as such, denies his input.

Ryley ventures deeper into 4546B, learning of the Architects' history through exploration of their facilities. He discovers the last living Sea Emperor, still captive in an Architect containment facility, who can communicate telepathically. Ryley activates a teleporter inside her aquarium to allow the Leviathan's young to leave; in exchange, she provides Ryley with the recipe for an enzyme that will allow her eggs to hatch. Ryley uses the enzyme to hatch the eggs; the Leviathan young release large quantities of potent Enzyme 42 into the environment, curing Ryley and halting the bacterium's spread throughout 4546B. Finally at peace, the ancient Sea Emperor bids Ryley farewell and lays down to die.

A cured Ryley can disable the Quarantine Enforcement Platform, construct an escape rocket based on blueprints recovered from the Aurora wreck, and leave the planet. In its final telepathic communication, the Sea Emperor poetically compares itself with Ryley.

== Development ==
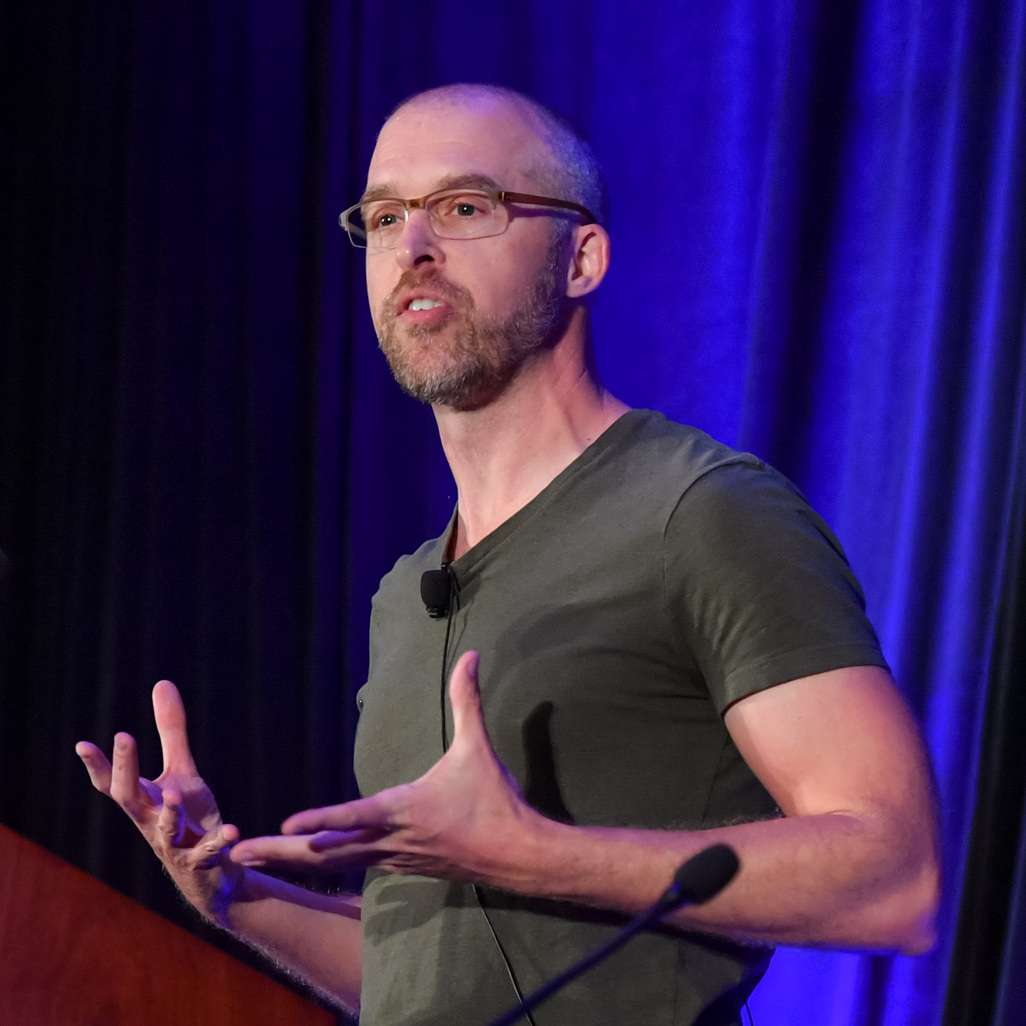
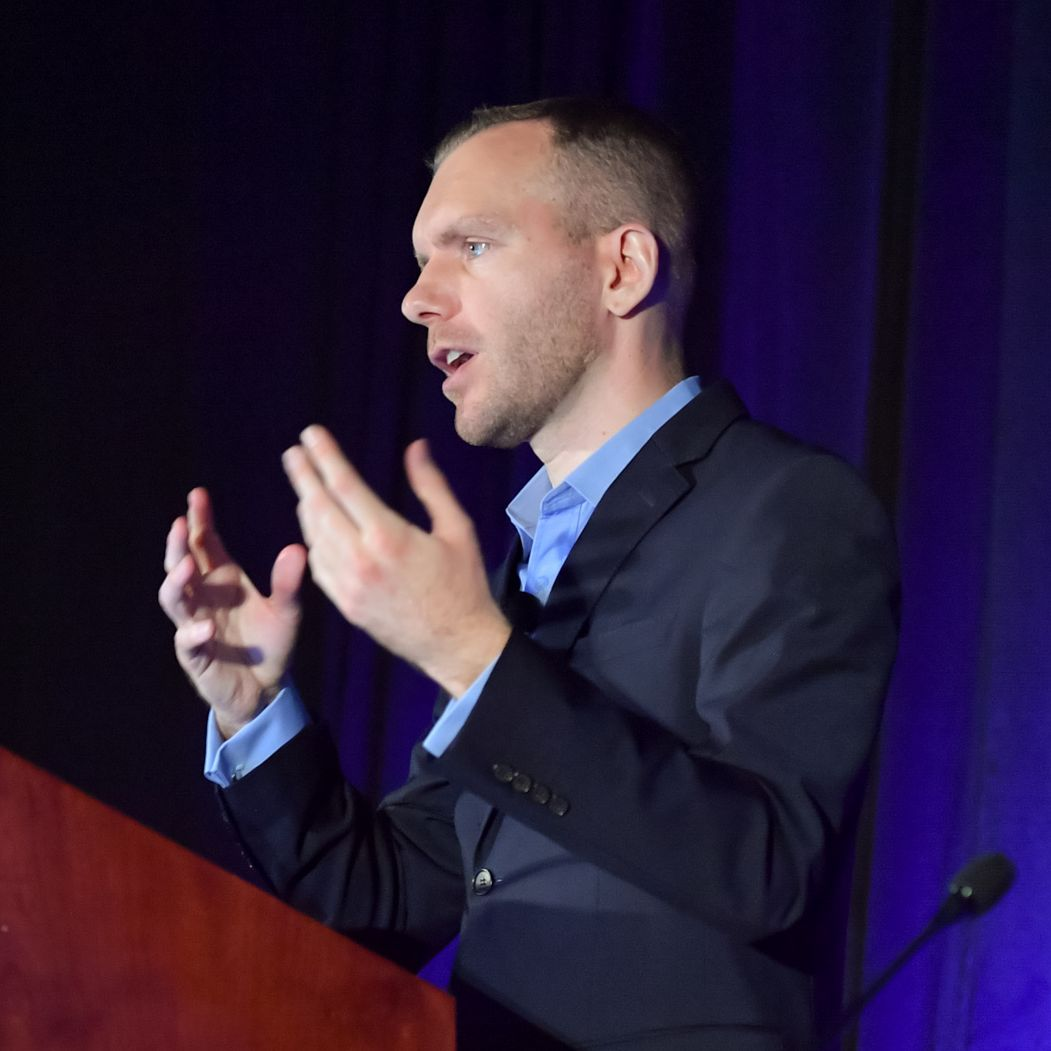
Charlie Cleveland and Jonas Boetel presenting at the Game Developers Conference 2019

Subnautica was announced by Unknown Worlds Entertainment on December 17, 2013, with Charlie Cleveland as the director and lead gameplay programmer, and Hugh Jeremy as the producer. The music is composed by Simon Chylinski.

Cleveland was heavily inspired by Minecraft, which he noted "transformed the game industry" and "threw away all traditional challenge oriented and progression oriented games". The release of Minecraft overlapped with Unknown Worlds releasing Natural Selection 2. Feeling exhausted, the team wanted to try something new and decided to make such a game. Other influences included scuba diving, the filmography of James Cameron, and "just the feeling of exploring the deep, dark, alternately beautiful and terrible, ocean depths. Feeling like I'm an explorer, almost an astronaut, not knowing what I'll find". Cleveland did not initially view it as a survival game but as an exploration game. The team was motivated by the Sandy Hook Elementary School shooting to make a non-violent game without lethal guns.

The development team opted to use the Unity engine rather than Spark, the engine used for the company's previous game, Natural Selection 2. Subnautica producer Hugh Jeremy justified this decision because of the different demands that the game places on the engine, and "because [the team] does not include people working on Spark, it's not appropriate for Subnautica to use Spark. By using Unity for Subnautica, Spark can continue to develop in certain directions, while Subnautica develops in others. To use Spark for Subnautica would be like trying to fit a square peg in a round hole."

The game lacks the traditional mission or quest structure usually found in video games. This was a deliberate choice; Cleveland stated "with intrinsic rewards, people are instead encouraged to just do the activities for their own merit, less people would be motivated to do it. But, if they did get over that learning period they would get to the point where they internalized that activity as pleasurable on its own and they would continue". Cleveland opted for this after reading an essay by Jamie Cheng who implemented similar philosophies into his game Don't Starve.

Early access versions of Subnautica were released on Steam Early Access on December 16, 2014 and on Xbox One Preview on May 17, 2016. During this initial release the game featured no hunger or thirst mechanics. After receiving criticism, specifically from one player whose critique "struck home for me", the team opted to include such a system eventually discovering that it helped players orient themselves to the early parts of the game. The full version of the game was released on January 23, 2018, for macOS and Windows personal computers, and on December 4, 2018, for PlayStation 4 and Xbox One consoles. The Nintendo Switch, PlayStation 5 and Xbox Series X/S versions of the game and a spin-off, called Subnautica: Below Zero, were released on May 14, 2021. Previously, Below Zero was released in early access on January 30, 2019.

In May 2025, game publisher Playdigious announced that Subnautica will be released on Android and iOS platforms on July 8, 2025. As of that date, the game has been officially launched and is available for download on both platforms. The mobile version includes the complete original game with all core modes, Survival, Freedom, and Creative, optimized for mobile play. It also features cloud saves, controller support, and a redesigned interface for touchscreen controls.

== Reception ==
Reception

Aggregate score
| Aggregator | Score |
|---|---|
| Metacritic | (PC) 87/100 (PS4) 80/100 (XONE) 81/100 |

Review scores
| Publication | Score |
|---|---|
| Destructoid | 9.5/10 |
| Game Informer | 8.75/10 |
| GameSpot | 9/10 |
| GamesRadar+ | 4/5 |
| IGN | 9.1/10 |
| Nintendo Life | 9/10 |
| Nintendo World Report | 8/10 |
| PlayStation Official Magazine – UK | 8/10 |
| Official Xbox Magazine (UK) | 8/10 |
| PC Gamer (US) | 89/100 |

Subnautica received positive pre-release reception. Ian Birnbaum of PC Gamer described Subnautica as an "underwater Minecraft ", remarking that "with an experienced developer at the helm and a limitless variety of the oceans to play with, it's going to take a lot for Subnautica to go badly wrong. As the toolbox gets deeper and the shape of the end-game gets set, Subnautica will be a unique example of the ways survival can be tense, rewarding, and fun." Marsh Davies of Rock, Paper, Shotgun praised the rewarding nature of exploring the world of Subnautica, but criticized the "arbitrariness" and lack of intuition in some of the in-game recipes.

At launch, the game received "generally positive reviews" on all platforms according to review aggregator Metacritic.

By January 2020, more than 5.23 million copies had been sold across all platforms.

=== Accolades ===
| Year | Award | Category | Result | Ref. |
|---|---|---|---|---|
| 2018 | Golden Joystick Awards | Best Visual Design | Nominated | |
| 2018 | Golden Joystick Awards | Best Audio Design | Nominated | |
| 2018 | Golden Joystick Awards | Breakthrough Award (Unknown Worlds) | Won | |
| 2018 | Golden Joystick Awards | PC Game of the Year | Won | |
| 2018 | Golden Joystick Awards | Ultimate Game of the Year | Nominated | |
| 2018 | Gamers' Choice Awards | Fan Favorite Indie Game | Won | |
| 2019 | 22nd Annual D.I.C.E. Awards | Outstanding Achievement in Game Design | Nominated | |
| 2019 | National Academy of Video Game Trade Reviewers Awards | Game of the Year | Nominated | |
| 2019 | National Academy of Video Game Trade Reviewers Awards | Sound Effects | Nominated | |
| 2019 | 15th British Academy Games Awards | Original Property | Nominated | |

== See also ==
- List of underwater science fiction works
- The Abyss
