= Natural Selection (video game) =

- Developer: Unknown Worlds Entertainment
- Designer: Charlie Cleveland
- Engine: GoldSrc
- Platform: Windows
- Release: October 31, 2002
- Genres: First-person shooter, real-time strategy
- Mode: Multiplayer

Natural Selection is a modification for the video game Half-Life. Its concept is a mixture of the first-person shooter and real-time strategy game genres. The game was created by Charlie "Flayra" Cleveland, who later founded the company Unknown Worlds Entertainment. Natural Selection v1 was first publicly released on Halloween 2002, and is now at version 3.2. Natural Selection 2 was released in late 2012.

The game features two teams: Kharaa (alien species) and Frontiersmen (human space marines). The visible Kharaa "units" are actually simply the spawn of the real Kharaa (aliens) which are microscopic life-forms according to the storyline. The game was, in 2008, one of the ten most played Half-Life modifications in terms of players, according to GameSpy. On January 22, 2014 Unknown Worlds released the source code for download on a GitHub repository under GPLv3.

== Gameplay ==
Screenshot of the alien builder class, the Gorge

Natural Selection is a hybrid FPS/RTS that pits Marines against Aliens ("the Kharaa"), played primarily in the first-person perspective, within the confines of large atmospheric maps of spaceships or space stations, which have been invaded by the Kharaa.

There are two game modes in Natural Selection: Classic and Combat.

Classic is the original Natural Selection game, mixing FPS and RTS elements.

Top-down commander mode

Natural Selection was one of the first multiplayer, first-person shooters to incorporate a "Commander", whose view of the battlefield was essentially 2-D, from a strictly top-down perspective. One member of the marine team must enter the "command chair" to lead the team, and thus become the "Commander". From here, he can purchase upgrades, issue movement orders and drop supplies - all from an overhead perspective, as in many RTS games. The commander can also place buildings, although these are inactive until built by players in the field.

The alien team has no defined leader, and so it must communicate and co-operate to ensure different roles are fulfilled as needed. There is only one "Builder Class", the Gorge which can be used to build a multitude of structures. Gorges can choose to build three different "upgrade" chambers: Movement, Defense, and Sensory, each providing three distinct abilities each alien can get. Gorges can also build Offense chambers which damage Marines from a distance, and resource towers. When a resource nozzle is capped, the resources gained are split evenly among all aliens. Each alien can choose how he wants to use his own personal reserve of resource points : building structures (as a gorge), or gestating into higher lifeforms. On death of the lifeform or structure, there is no refund on the resource points spent. Kharaa "Hive Sight" reveals teammates through the walls and structures of the map, this was originally their answer to the commander with his top-down overview of the game. However, in later versions both teams have gained substantial advantage from the addition of a map hotkey. This overlays the whole level, showing teammates and friendly structures; plus enemies and structures currently in view of comrades, and areas under attack.

The aliens start with one active hive, randomly chosen from the 3 hive spots of the map. Active hives heal damaged aliens and respawn dead players. Marines initially spawn in a set location on the map, and after that spawn from Infantry Portals, which can be built in a set radius of the Command Chair. Healing and ammunition can be dropped by the commander in 'packs' (at a cost) or obtained free from an Armoury.

The teams compete for territory, and critically for the resources ('res') it offers. The currency for both sides, resources are obtained by building resource towers to tap the nozzles sited around the map. This is another area where the teams have a key difference - while marines draw on a common pool of resources, each alien accumulates a personal store. This further increases the requirement for teamwork on the alien side, to achieve the right balance of hives, lifeforms, resource towers and chambers.

The game ends when either all the marines or aliens are dead, and have no means to respawn. For the Frontiersmen (marine) side, this entails destroying all alien hives, ensuring no further alien players may respawn, and then hunting the rest down. For the Kharaa (alien) side, winning requires destroying all marine "Infantry Portals", ensuring that they do not respawn, and then eliminating the rest of the marines. Other possibilities exist such as destroying the command chair, or destroying all finished hives, and killing the whole alien team before the remaining hive is fully grown.

Game duration and game balance has been continually addressed by Unknown Worlds Entertainment throughout each of their releases with extensive changelogs describing these issues. In v1, games were slower and often measured in hours. One of the stated aims of v2 was to address this, by introducing a broad range of changes to abilities, structures, etc. In current releases (v3), a typical game lasts 5–15 minutes, but can run over an hour, with both sides vying for control over strategically important Hive Rooms and Resource Nodes.

Combat is the team deathmatch, or beginner mode of NS. It was introduced in NS 3.0 to help new players learn how to play alien lifeforms in an easier environment.

Neither team can build structures, the marines do not have a commander, and aliens have only one hive. Each player has an individual experience meter, increased by killing enemies; dealing damage to the enemy hive/command chair or healing/repairing their own hive/command chair. When the experience meter reaches maximum, the player gains a level and it resets.

There have been various changes to the spawn system in the various betas to try to make matches more interesting and more winnable but also without making it such that a team that suffers a major loss of players can still come back. An admin configurable time limit (default 15 minutes) was introduced in beta 5 which remains in the final version. With the time limit, Marines are usually on the attacking side and Kharaa are on the defending side. Failure of the attacking side to win within the time limit results in a victory for the defending side.

== Reception ==
Reception

Review scores
Publication	Score
PC Zone	93% (12/16/02)
FiringSquad	5 out of 5

Award
Publication	Award
GameSpy	2002 Mod of the Year

- GameSpy hailed Natural Selection as "possibly the most ambitious user-made modification ever brought to fruition. This multiplayer-only mod somehow manages to transform the aging Half-Life into a seemingly brand-new, atmospheric, and surprisingly deep action-strategy game, pitting hive-minded aliens against resourceful space marines," and "Natural Selection's innovations are too numerous to list, but the marine's "commander" mode deserves special mention. Playing as the marine commander, you can order and re-supply other marines in an RTS-style, top-down perspective."
- FiringSquad : "The way all these details boil down in gameplay is simply amazing, and occasionally fascinating to just watch unfold," and "is probably one of the most creative and well thought out shooters we’ve played in a very long time."

== Sequel ==
Natural Selection 2 is the sequel to Natural Selection. Natural Selection 2 started development using the Source Engine, but their development blog later announced that Unknown Worlds had moved to the Spark engine, an engine they created themselves. Natural Selection 2 has the same basic gameplay as Natural Selection, but with new weapons and abilities. It was released commercially on Steam. According to an interview with the game director, Charlie Cleveland (Flayra), the sequel continues where the original left off and features environments that are dark and denser. Several gameplay modes once available only as community-developed mods (such as Marines vs. Marines) became officially supported. In addition, a major new feature of Natural Selection 2 is dynamic infestation, released in December 2006. The proposed feature would dynamically generate bacterial infestation based on what areas of the map the alien team controlled. The alpha testing of Natural Selection 2 began on 26 July 2010. The game was released on October 30, 2012.
