= Puzzle Bots =

2010 video game

- Developer: Ivy Games
- Publisher: Wadjet Eye Games
- Engine: Adventure Game Studio
- Platform: Microsoft Windows
- Release: May 7, 2010 (Online); October 25, 2010 (Steam)
- Genre: Adventure
- Mode: Single-player

Puzzle Bots is a graphic adventure developed by Ivy Games and published by Wadjet Eye Games. The game uses a point-and-click interface to interact with the environment, solve puzzles, and communicate with characters.

== Reception ==
Reception

Aggregate score
Aggregator	Score
Metacritic	72/100

Review scores
Publication	Score
Adventure Gamers	4/5
Eurogamer	7/10
Gamezebo	4/5
PALGN	6.5/10

The game received "mixed or average reviews" according to the review aggregation website Metacritic. Gamezebo called it "An incredibly charming adventure, packed with plenty of humor and some deviously clever puzzles." Adventure Gamers also praised the game's "great mix of bot abilities and [...] charming story".

== See also ==
- Gravity Ghost
