= Unknown Worlds Entertainment =

American video game developer

Unknown Worlds Entertainment, Inc.
- Type: Subsidiary
- Industry: Video games
- Founded: 2001; 25 years ago
- Founder: Charlie Cleveland; Max McGuire
- Headquarters: San Francisco, California
- Products: Natural Selection; Subnautica; Subnautica 2
- Parent: Krafton (2021–present)
- Website: unknownworlds.com

Unknown Worlds Entertainment, Inc. is an American video game developer based in San Francisco. The studio is best known for the Natural Selection and Subnautica series. In October 2021, the studio was acquired by South Korean video game developer Krafton.

== History ==
Unknown Worlds was formed in May 2001 by Charlie Cleveland and began life as a group of developers responsible for the development of the high-profile free mod for Half-Life, Natural Selection. The success of Natural Selection convinced Cleveland to start work on a commercial sequel to the game: Natural Selection 2. Soon after, Cleveland founded Unknown Worlds Entertainment as a commercial computer games studio.

Although the casual games market is not the intended direction of Unknown Worlds, Zen of Sudoku, a casual puzzle computer game based on the popular logic puzzle Sudoku, was created in November 2006 in order to generate revenue towards funding the development of Natural Selection 2. Charlie Cleveland, one of the developers of Unknown Worlds Entertainment, cited casual games development as a "last option" for funding this sequel, having been unwilling to sacrifice control of the company to external investors.

In October 2006, Max McGuire became the studio's co-founder, having previously worked at Iron Lore Entertainment as Lead Engine Programmer. McGuire became the Technical Director of UWE and development of Natural Selection 2 began in earnest. Max and Charlie then attracted a group of angel investors including Richard Kain, Matthew Le Merle, Ira Rothken and Colin Wiel to back the company after a meeting at GDC in San Francisco. A year later, Unknown Worlds released Decoda as a commercial debugger for the Lua programming language. This application was created to aid with development of Natural Selection 2, whose game code was largely being written in Lua.

Later on in development of Natural Selection 2, the studio announced it had changed engine from the Source engine to their own proprietary engine developed in-house. After consulting their fanbase on a possible name for their new engine, it was finally named the Evolution engine. Later, it transpired that the name Evolution was already taken and Spark was chosen as the name for the engine.

In June 2008, Cory Strader was hired as art director. Strader had been a previous key member of the development team for Natural Selection. In May 2009, Unknown Worlds began taking pre-orders for standard and special edition versions of Natural Selection 2. Natural Selection 2 was released on 31 October 2012.

Perfect World acquired a 40% stake in Unknown Worlds Entertainment in August 2011 for CN¥10,803,330. It raised this to a controlling interest in February 2013 by acquiring a further 20% for CN¥5,098,956. During its 2019 fiscal year, Perfect World sold the majority of its shares in Unknown Worlds to the Founders. It sold the remainder in January 2021 to the founders at $50 million valuation, few months before the acquisition by Krafton.

=== Acquisition and legal conflicts with Krafton ===
In October 2021, South Korean video game holding company and publisher Krafton, known for overseeing titles such as PlayerUnknown's Battlegrounds and TERA through its subsidiaries, announced that it would acquire Unknown Worlds. Krafton stated that Unknown Worlds would continue to operate independently.

Subnautica 2, a sequel to Subnautica and Subnautica: Below Zero, was scheduled to be released in early access in 2025 for Windows and Xbox Series X/S. Months before the expected release of Subnautica 2, Krafton announced in July 2025 that Unknown Worlds founders Cleveland and McGuire, as well as CEO Ted Gill, had been replaced by Steve Papoutsis from Krafton's subsidiary Striking Distance Studios, best known for developing The Callisto Protocol. Krafton initially did not provide a reason for their departure, but said "While Krafton sought to keep the Unknown Worlds' co-founders and original creators of the Subnautica series involved in the game's development, the company wishes them well on their next endeavors." At the same time the release date of Subnautica 2 was pushed to 2026, with a statement citing playtest feedback, though the departing founders stated the game was ready for its early access release. According to Jason Schreier of Bloomberg News, the move was made months before Krafton was to pay $250 million to Unknown Worlds for an on-time delivery of Subnautica 2. Players reacted to departures, delay, and Schreier's story by threatening to boycott Subnautica 2 and review bomb the game at release. In response, Krafton stated that the original leadership was removed as it had abandoned its responsibilities at the studio, leading to significant delays in Subnautica 2's development. According to Schreier, by July 17, Krafton clarified that they would pay a $25 million bonus spread across around forty specific developers at Unknown Worlds, the remaining staff to receive an end-of-year bonus, for delivery of Subnautica 2 in 2026.

Cleveland, McGuire, and Gill filed a lawsuit against Krafton that month, accusing Krafton of sabotaging the early access release of Subnautica 2 to avoid the $250M payment. The lawsuit asserted that after Krafton's U.S. team had met with the Korean staff about marketing for Subnautica 2, the U.S. team returned and tried to convince Unknown Worlds to delay Subnautica 2's early access release. When the studio refused, Krafton then replaced the cofounders.

Kotaku later reported on a leaked internal memo between Krafton and Unknown Worlds from May 2025 that said the publisher did not believe that the amount of content in Subnautica 2 was sufficient to "drive IP growth and expansion", and had sought for Unknown Worlds to increase the amount of game by 30%; Krafton confirmed the memo was legitimate, resulting from a milestone review of the current build of Subnautica 2, and had "recommended to enhance the content volume and level of polish before launching", stating that the developers had removed some of the planned content set in their early access scheduled from 2023, and "due to a gap between the current state and the content volume assumed during the initial launch planning, it is necessary to reassess the release timeline and roadmap." Krafton further stated that they delayed the game "to protect the interests of game fans and ensure the long-term success of the franchise." In its response to the founders' lawsuit, Krafton said they were trying to avoid a similar situation that occurred with Kerbal Space Program 2, with an unfinished game rushed out to sales could harm the company's reputation, and that the founders were placing more emphasis on the $250 million than meeting the scope goals for Subnautica 2. In March 2026, the judge in the case ordered that Gill be reinstated as CEO of Unknown Worlds and given control of Subnautica 2 and the early access plans, and enjoined Krafton from firing Gill. The judge also extended the original $250 million payout to Unknown Worlds for making its early access release out until September 2026. A day after the judge's order, current CEO Papoutsis affirmed they had reached an agreement with Krafton to release Subnautica 2 in early access by May 2026, as well as transition Gill back to lead development. Krafton affirmed the agreement though stated they planned to appeal the court's decision. On July 1, 2026, Krafton would settle the lawsuit by paying out the $250m bonus to the founders over three years, in addition to paying out an unspecified bonus to the rest of Unknown Worlds staff. As part of the settlement, Ted Gill resigned to be replaced by a yet undecided CEO.

A separate lawsuit was filed by Unknown Worlds against the former founders in August 2025, claiming they abandoned the studio and took confidential information related to the company, Subnautica and other games the studio developed. The lawsuit also states that some of this confidential information became part of the founders' lawsuit against Krafton, all which violated their employee confidentiality agreements.

== Games ==
- Half-Life: Natural Selection (2002)
- Zen of Sudoku (2006)
- Natural Selection 2 (2012)
- Subnautica (2018)
- Subnautica: Below Zero (2021)
- Moonbreaker (2024)
- Subnautica 2 (2026)
