= Photographer (disambiguation) =

A photographer is a person who takes photographs using a camera.

Photographer(s) may also refer to:

- Photographer (film), a 2006 Malayalam drama
- The Photographer (opera), a chamber opera by composer Philip Glass
- The Photographer (1953 film), a Mexican comedy thriller film
- The Photographer (1974 film), an American thriller film
- The Photographer (2000 film), a film directed by Jeremy Stein
- The Photographer (comics), about a Médecins Sans Frontières mission during the height of the Soviet war in Afghanistan

== See also ==
- List of photographers
- Photograph (disambiguation)
- Photographer of Dreams, a concert programme of Russian pop star Valery Leontiev
