= Subnautica 2 =

2026 video game

- Developer: Unknown Worlds Entertainment
- Publishers: Unknown Worlds Entertainment; Krafton
- Composer: Ben Prunty
- Series: Subnautica
- Engine: Unreal Engine 5
- Platforms: Windows; Xbox Series X/S
- Release: May 14, 2026 (early access)
- Genres: Action-adventure, survival
- Modes: Single-player, multiplayer

Subnautica 2 is an action-adventure survival game developed by Unknown Worlds Entertainment. It is a sequel to Subnautica (2018) and the third game in the series after Subnautica: Below Zero (2021). The game was released in early access on May 14, 2026.

== Gameplay ==
Set on a new planet, Subnautica 2 supports single-player and co-op gameplay with a total of up to four players. This is the first time multiplayer gameplay is present in the series. A cinematic trailer showed new vehicles, new creatures and environments. Players are also able to modify their own DNA to acquire abilities, a feature that was originally cut from Subnautica. As one of the first game's cut features, players were able to use a tool called the transfuser, along with a base piece called the centrifuge, to extract DNA from creatures in the ocean and use them to create consumable items that would alter the player's (or other creatures') attributes. In Subnautica 2, this is adapted into the biomod system. Players can use the biolab to access biomods, which give the player certain abilities (such as longer oxygen duration while stationary and faster speed when close to surfaces). Players can also use the bioscanner to unlock new biomods by scanning wildlife.

== Plot ==
Because the game is still in early access, not much of the gameplay and story have been complete, as such, the majority of the story takes place before the playable character reaches the planet. The story before the main events of the playable game are as follows: En route to the desert world of Zezura, the Alterra colony-ship Cicada diverts course and crash-lands on an uncharted ocean moon, named Proteus. Due to extreme atmospheric pressure and severe heavy metal contamination all human life is left dead within minutes. To combat this, the ship's onboard "Noetic Advisor" (NoA), an advanced artificial intelligence, puts the backed-up consciousness of survivors in new physical bodies via "reprinting". NoA controls which brain state to restore, resulting in severe memory loss and dissociation.

The initial colonists are afflicted by a psychosis characterised by hallucinations, violent behaviour, and suicidal thoughts, dubbed Masefield Syndrome by colony surgeon Sophie Boucher. The pioneers discover a highly territorial alien race, called the “Tailings” however, they are actually the remnants of a superior alien race which are known as the Axum. As disease, attacks by the Tailings, and other biological incompatibilities grip the survivors, NoA begins deliberately killing the pioneers and resetting them to much older states of themselves to make the effects of the “masfield syndrome” be reset. All these factors cause the settles to be driven to higher tension among themselves. Survivor Nahema Nakota, severely affected by Masefield and weary of NoA's actions, forms a rebel faction called the Jubilee based on a fixation with the colossal "World Tree" on the horizon, encouraging survivors to abandon the colony and swim out to the tree's base. The Jubilee set off a bomb at one of the habitats, allowing Nahema to steal a Tadpole and set off for the World Tree. Sophie in turn departs in pursuit of Nahema.

Over time, all of the initial survivors vanish or die without being reprinted (after this is when the playable character comes into the story). More than 25 years after the pioneers' disappearances, NoA prints a "Qualified Investigator" (QI), the playable character, to investigate their whereabouts. The QI learns the fate of several survivors through various flight recorders and voice recordings left at the colony's bases. The QI encounters a preserved simulation of Sophie’s mind maintained by a local NoA node. She explains that Masefield Syndrome is caused by Proteavirus, a viral organism pervasive throughout the moon and whose source appears to be linked to the World Tree. She also explains her belief that Nahema intends to poison the World Tree, ending all human life on Proteus and ravaging its ecosystem. She believes that the only way to stop Masefield Syndrome is to destroy the World Tree, and then the Noetic Advisor (NoA) directs the QI to the ruins of an alien civilization known as the Axum.

The player goes through a perilous journey over a large marine trench devoid of any life, save for a highly intelligent Collector Leviathan that patrols the area. Arriving at the ruins, the QI discovers a Rosetta Stone-like obelisk indicating the Axum made contact with the Architects from the planet 4546b, prior to the events of Subnautica and Subnautica: Below Zero. After restoring a damaged alien power plant, the QI activates a nearby alien observatory which broadcasts a distress signal to the Architects. It explains that the World Tree is blighted by a virus. The QI is directed to "Find the Veps" and cross the Great Trench to reach an abandoned Axum settlement, named Xanadu, at the base of the World Tree.

It can be speculated that the remainder of the plot will involve travelling to Xanadu and restoring the World Tree. The upcoming early access update appears to take the player into the home of the Collector Leviathan, the Scorpius Trenches, in order to restore the Trident submarine or "Big sub", a large 4 person submarine similar to the Cyclops from Subnautica.

== Development ==
Subnautica 2 was initially confirmed to be in production on April 8, 2022, as "the next game in the Subnautica universe". In November 2023, publisher Krafton revealed in a financial report that it was to be released sometime in 2025. This was followed by another report on February 8, 2024, that described it as a "multiplayer live-service game", creating fan backlash that prompted the developers to clarify that it would have "no season passes, no battle passes, no subscription".

The first screenshots of the game were published in 2024, some of which were hidden within Subnautica. A cinematic trailer for the game was released on October 17, 2024, during the Xbox Partner Showcase, with the early access release slated for 2025. On April 23, 2025, the first in a series of dev blogs was posted on YouTube showing new content and early gameplay footage.

Several major changes to the development team of Unknown Worlds Entertainment took place in July 2025 causing a number of lawsuits involving Krafton and the former development leads, with Krafton announcing that the early access release was delayed to 2026. A gameplay trailer was released alongside the delay announcement.

In May 2026, unofficial builds of the game reportedly circulated online. Unknown Worlds Entertainment stated that unauthorized builds had appeared on the internet. Allegations regarding the source of the leak circulated online, though no evidence publicly confirmed the claims.

It released as an early access title, available on PC and Xbox Series X and S on May 14, 2026. Subnautica 2 is made with Unreal Engine 5.

Following a development team member's dismissive response to feedback from the playerbase, Unknown Worlds Entertainment published a letter to the community to apologize for some recent comments from the team and detail the game's direction, including improvements to creature balance, gameplay built around vulnerability, exploration, and survival rather than traditional weapon-based combat, and early access as a collaboration with the community.

=== Staff firings and lawsuits ===
In July 2025, Krafton announced it had replaced Unknown Worlds's CEO Ted Gill—as well as studio co-founders Charlie Cleveland and Max McGuire—with Steve Papoutsis. Papoutsis had previously served as executive and senior producer at Striking Distance Studios, the developer of The Callisto Protocol. Following community backlash to the leadership change, Unknown Worlds reiterated that the game would have "no subscriptions. No loot boxes. No battle pass. No microtransactions." Krafton stated that the original leadership were removed as they had abandoned their responsibilities at the studio, leading to significant delays in Subnautica 2's development. Development slides showing content changes were anonymously leaked to the media during July in an apparent attempt to defend the firings and quell a rising playerbase backlash against Krafton.

Cleveland, McGuire, and Gill filed a lawsuit against Krafton related to their firings that same month. It had come to light that the firings and delayed release had come months before Krafton was due to pay the development team a bonus worth up to US$250 million based on revenue targets that a release into early access would have helped achieve. The lawsuit revealed that the plan to avoid the payout was created through the use of ChatGPT by Krafton's CEO, Changhan Kim, after their legal team had warned him that the payout had to be made even if Cleveland, Gill, and McGuire were dismissed with cause.

In March 2026, a judge reinstated Gill as CEO of Unknown Worlds. The judge found that Krafton had "breached the EPA (Equity Purchase Agreement) by terminating the key employees without valid cause and by improperly seizing operational control of Unknown Worlds". As a result, the board decision on July 1—at which Krafton fired the founders, took over control of Unknown Worlds and delayed Subnautica 2—has been "declared ineffective to the extent it infringes on Gill's operational control right". Furthermore, the $250 million earnout period was reintroduced until September 15, 2026, with the option to be extended until March 15, 2027.

On March 18, 2026, it was announced that the game would be released in early access in May 2026. However, the reinstated Unknown Worlds' leadership team claimed that the news was improperly released by Krafton and "undermined the relief sought" for in the trial, which was for Gill to determine when and how the game was to be released. Krafton insisted that their announcement did not violate the order or show contempt.

== Reception ==
=== Sales ===
The game sold more than 1 million copies within its first hour of launch, and 2 million copies within 12 hours. By July 2026, the game had sold more than 5 million copies.

== See also ==
- List of underwater science fiction works
