= The Darkside Detective =

2017 video game by Spooky Doorway

- Game cover
- Developer: Spooky Doorway
- Publisher: Akupara Games
- Programmers: Treasa McCabe; Ben Marquez Keenan
- Artist: Paul Conway
- Writer: Dave McCabe
- Composer: Ben Prunty
- Engine: Unity
- Platforms: Linux; macOS; Windows; Nintendo Switch; PlayStation 4; PlayStation 5; Xbox One; Xbox Series X/S; Stadia; Atari VCS
- Release: Linux, Mac, Windows; July 27, 2017; Switch; February 8, 2018; PS4, PS5, Xbox One & X/S; April 8, 2021; Stadia; April 15, 2021; Atari VCS; August 10, 2021
- Genre: Point-and-click adventure
- Mode: Single-player

The Darkside Detective is a 2017 point-and-click adventure developed by Spooky Doorway, and published by Akupara Games. It was released for Microsoft Windows, macOS, and Linux on July 27, 2017, for Nintendo Switch on February 7, 2018 and for PlayStation 4, PlayStation 5, Xbox One, Xbox Series X/S, and Stadia in April 2021. A version for the Atari VCS released in August 2021. A limited run of 5,000 physical copies for the Nintendo Switch was released on 26 September 2019. A sequel, The Darkside Detective: A Fumble in the Dark, was released in April 2021.

== Game Setting ==
The Darkside Detective is set in the fictional city of Twin Lakes, a metropolis known for its occasional reports of criminal activity. Several of the reports are discovered to be of a supernatural nature, as the city is linked to an otherworldly ghost world reflection of itself known as the 'Darkside'. Owing to this, the Twin Lakes' police department keeps its own (though underfunded) branch known as the Darkside Division, headed by Detective Francis McQueen and his partner Patrick Dooley, who investigate such cases.

The game is known for its satirical nature, drawing multiple references to pop culture, including its case names such as "Buy Hard" or "Don of the Dead". It also draws strong influence from buddy cop, science fiction and horror movie genres. All cases but "Buy Hard", "Polterguys" and "Baits Motel" (which are part of the Bonus Cases made available with an update) are available with the game.

== Cases ==
=== "Malice in Wonderland" ===
McQueen and Dooley are called in to investigate a missing child occurrence in the home of the wealthy Jones family. The child, Alice, has not been seen for over a day and there was no witnessing of her leaving the house, even though she was under the direct care of her babysitter, Nanny McPhiend. When McQueen goes to interrogate McPhiend in the master bedroom, he notices something under the bed, discovered to be a page related to occultism. As McQueen and Dooley search the house, they discover both a blacklight lamp and pencil, which they test at the upper attic, revealing a door-like drawing on the wall. McQueen completes it using the page as reference, opening a door to the Darkside in which he finds Alice within.

As they prepare to leave, Alice and McQueen are cornered by McPhiend, who knocked out Dooley while he was at door cover duty. It is revealed that McPhiend intended to use the doorway to trap both Alice's parents and take Alice into custody as a legal guardian, thus gaining access to the Jones' inheritance. However, Alice, while exploring, unintentionally entered the doorway as the shelf holding paint thinner collapsed and sprayed at the wall, cleaning a part of the drawing and closing the doorway, trapping Alice within.

McQueen manages to fool McPhiend into getting him and Alice to the real world, under the pretense of having to drag Dooley within as well. McQueen quickly grabs the paint thinner and splashes it on the doorway corner while McPhiend is within, trapping her in the Darkside. Alice is returned to her parents as McQueen and Dooley, now recovered, return to the precinct musing "what sort of paperwork covers this mess".

=== "Tome Alone" ===
McQueen and Dooley arrive at the Twin Lakes Library to return some overdue books when they discover a storm with a mysterious purple vortex happening above the building, whose lights are also constantly flickering. As they ask the local Librarian, Doris, she suspects a frequently visiting child, Devon, is behind the occurrences. They approach Devon talking to a floating book, but he pretends to know nothing on the matter. They also come across Raxa, an occultism and computer science college student also investigating the occurrences in the Library, who reports a strange glow coming from a stack of microfilm.

As McQueen uses a viewmaster to investigate the microfilm, he spots an old case newspaper report with an eye-like drawing, that suddenly makes McQueen start seeing ghosts of popular literary authors across the Library, including Aleister Crowley, W.B. Yeats, Enid Blyton, Mary Shelley, Douglas Adams and Terry Pratchett. After resolving a dispute between the ghosts of H. P. Lovecraft and Edgar Allan Poe by using a book Doris was reading, "Guylight", McQueen discovers a secret passageway within the horror section of the Library, finding a clandestine collection of occult books, one of them being a tome charged by faulty electric wiring from the building's lightning rod on the rooftop. McQueen and Dooley head to the rooftop where they perform a bypass at the rod's wiring, cutting electric supply to the faulty wiring where the tome is. With the energy cut, the storm passes away and the ghosts all disappear.

McQueen and Dooley confiscate the occult books, making a deal with Doris not to issue a fine as the charges against Devon are dropped. McQueen also advises Doris to fix the faulty wiring as they return to the precinct.

=== "Disorient Express" ===
McQueen is called by Dooley to pick him up for a ride after he learns the subway station is closed down. After learning that the station is closed due to a literal ghost train on the platform, however, McQueen decides to stay and investigate, discovering a portal to the Darkside at the tunnel where the ghost train is as well as other occurrences on the real world, such as a ghost using a toilet and a purple tentacle as well. Travelling to the Darkside, McQueen and Dooley come across their twisted versions of the Darkside, Agent McScream and Chief Ghouley of the Brightside Division, as well as they find the real world train, with Raxa suspiciously inside. Investigating the train station on the Darkside, McQueen is able to acquire a key to the control room on the real world, but is unable to get it across due to McScream, forcing McQueen to use the toilet tentacle, through a plunger, to transport the key between both worlds.

Using the key to unlock the control room, they find Tam, a disgruntled engineer who infected the control systems with a supernatural virus, as retaliation for being fired as he was sleeping on the job (explained by Tam that he attended black magic classes at midnight hour to the morning hours, where it was his shift immediately afterwards). With Raxa's aid, McQueen and Dooley are able to clean the infection and restore the control systems, allowing both the ghost train and the real world train to traverse to their respective worlds and restore transit. Tam is arrested and taken to the precinct.

=== "Police Farce" ===
As McQueen and Dooley head out to Officer McNugget's retirement party at the precinct, they enter to discover the gift pile is on fire, which McQueen quickly puts away, revealing a mysterious urn. McQueen recognizes it as a magical urn meant to hold gremlins which belonged to a previously investigated Chinese store, but Dooley foolishly bought it as a gift and allowed the gremlins to run loose. McQueen and Dooley are forced to scramble across the precinct to collect all the gremlins provoking mischief (such as in the dispatch station, where a gremlin is eating the server's wiring and another in the shooting gallery is armed), neutralizing them with electricity and tear gas.

As all the gremlins are collected and put back in the urn, Dooley accidentally lets it slip to the floor, breaking it. Using a clay package from a union worker, McQueen makes a new urn, but requires a tome to enchant it and entrap the gremlins back again, which is in the evidence room, blocked by McQueen's rival, Detective McKing, on a dating attempt. McQueen spikes a cup of coffee with laxatives to force McKing to the bathroom, allowing McQueen to enter the evidence room, acquire the tome, perform the ritual and trap all gremlins back.

When McQueen and Dooley return to the party, they discover the party is over, with the cake being eaten, and are forced to clean their mess as the department's budget "doesn't allow for both your capers and the custodial staff".

=== "Loch Mess" ===
McQueen is called by Dooley's "Bloodwolves" scout group to attend an emergency at their camp site (Ironically named Camp Site), during the group's jamboree. Arriving there, the kids present - including Devon from the Library - inform McQueen Dooley had mysteriously vanished. When McQueen, accompanied by the scouts, start to investigate, they come across a sentient oscilloscope named BETI (Based on SETI, though "much better" and with a camera lens resembling HAL 9000), which informs Dooley had crossed the camp's lake after receiving a high frequency wi-fi signal. McQueen uses BETI to track Dooley's location to an island amidst the lake.

As McQueen reaches the isle and finds a cave entrance, he encounters Dooley in the company of the Loch Ness Monster, named Nigel, who has summoned Dooley for aid in evading 'government pursuit', when he is actually being stalked by the sensationalist reporter Dick Brickman as well as avid conspiracy theorists. Using an adulterated version of the printed map from BETI, McQueen manages to lead Brickman to a wrong location in the island as he uses the reporter's camera to photograph a mockery of the monster (which are the Bloodwolves piled up in a Chewbacca-ish costume) for the conspiracy theorists. Finally, McQueen crafts a tin foil hat for Nigel to use, to prevent the government from tracking him.

With all this done, Nigel is confident enough to return to the lake and depart while Dooley returns for the jamboree to continue.

=== "Don of the Dead" ===
McQueen and Dooley are summoned by Chief Scully, along with the entire staff, to attend occurrences during a city-wide riot, where a police officer was already injured. One detail that gets McQueen's attention is the mindless state of the supposed rioters. As he's dispatched, he's assigned to occurrences in three locations - The Twin Lakes Museum, a gift store in Chinatown (Revealed to be the store where Dooley had bought the urn with gremlins for the "Police Farce" party) and the mansion of the deceased crime boss Al Corpsone.

At the Mansion, they come across Raxa, now an "Inspooktor", after saving her when she is cornered by a rioter, revealed to be a zombie. Raxa informs she originally came to the mansion after learning of strange occurrences at the place, and her equipment's readings spiked when unknown creatures entered the mansion, supposedly looking for the Don. At the Chinatown store, they save the owner, Mister Wang, from his collection of monkey paws that started acting out of control. Wang tells McQueen that the paws started moving after some "floating goons" had robbed ritual components from the store. At the Museum, McQueen and Dooley investigate a break-in occurrence when they come across a mummy, which they lure back to its sarcophagus using a brain jar. McQueen and Dooley realize that a glass case of Osiris' bust was broken, with a gemstone missing. With what he learns of all three occurrences, McQueen realizes that criminals from the Darkside are intended on resurrecting Corpsone, utilizing the riot as a smoke screen to acquire the ritual components, Corpsone's corpse and the Gem of Osiris to perform the ritual.

McQueen and Dooley race to the graveyard, infested by the zombies but driven away by the gun fire of two gangster ghosts as a ghost priest starts the ritual at the crypt. Dooley and McQueen split ways, with Dooley headed to the sewers where he encounters an alligator named Jacques, watching television in the sewers, as well as an evil clown, Poundsmart, and a working crew which Dooley confuses for members of a secret organization. In the graveyard, McQueen comes across Smithy, a British World War I veteran as well as Agent McScream and Ghouley, pinned down within the graveyard's church. McQueen disguises himself as a zombie and learns their 'language' from McScream to gather a horde and breach through to the crypt. McQueen arrives too late to stop the ritual, and as the resurrected zombie Corpsone orders the other zombies to kill McQueen, the floor is collapsed by Dooley, who used a jackhammer in a sewer grating. When Dooley is pinned down in the rubble, McQueen uses a stolen car to collapse a water tower (blessed with holy water) to neutralize all zombies, but Corpsone survives and tries strangling Dooley until McQueen traps him in a lifesaver marked with ritual glyphs, banishing Corpsone back to the Darkside. McQueen and Dooley leave the crypt as McScream and Ghouley force the priest, Alexander Pope, to reverse his ritual and putting an end to all living dead, and thus the riots.

As they return to the precinct, they are dismayed to learn that McKing has taken all credit for stopping the riots, and the events of the zombie riot are dismissed by leaked water from the graveyard's tower which passed by the graves prior to flowing to the reservoir, provoking mass hysteria. Regardless, Dooley considers McQueen a hero for saving the city.

=== "Buy Hard" ===
McQueen and Dooley head to the Twin Lakes Mall in to buy late-Christmas gift while taking Dooley's unruly nephew, Buzz, along to visit Santa Claus. However, when they go visit Santa's house and briefly leave Buzz behind at the children's line, a sudden quake occurs in the mall which makes McQueen and Dooley race back to the house only to find Santa Claus has been transformed into the Krampus and the children - including Buzz - into unruly green gnomes, which start wreaking havoc across the mall. McQueen and Dooley are forced to capture and restrain Buzz, who was attempting to reach the Christmas tree's star through the mall's enormous fountain, interrogating him to learn that the Krampus is actually Santa's polar opposite, in which brings out the worst traits from children. When questioned in how to stop the Krampus, the Buzz-gnome informs that the Krampus is actually a lactose-intolerant, which has McQueen formulate a plan.

With the assistance of Emily, a member of the Bloodwolves who was with her family at the Mall Arcade and attempting to steal the claw machine's prizes, McQueen spikes a cookie with milk and has Emily deliver the cookie to the Krampus. The plan works as the Krampus inflates and floats away, revealing a ventilation shaft in which McQueen enters to investigate. Along the vents, he finds pieces of Santa Claus' clothing (And other strange things as a small city and the purple toilet tentacle from "Disorient Express") until he reaches Santa Claus himself, revealed to be the genuine Christmas figure who was kidnapped by the Krampus to jeopardize Christmas' night. Santa gives McQueen a supply of his Christmas dust to use it on the water supply and return the children to normal. As Santa tries leaving the mall however, his sleigh's reindeer Rudolph is bootstrapped by Detective McKing for illegal parking, and with all the Christmas dust used, the sleigh cannot lift off. McQueen however, manages to bring Emily, a non-believer of Santa Claus who starts believing after receiving her wished gift - a blowtorch - and creates Christmas dust around McQueen and Dooley's car.

Santa, McQueen and Dooley strap the sleigh to the police car and all take off and start delivering gifts before returning home to a merry Christmas, accidentally leaving Buzz, still tied to the chair even after returning to normal, behind.

=== "Polterguys" ===
Dooley invites McQueen to his house for dinner (As McQueen usually does so every once in a month), but when they enter the house and into the living room, they find the television possessed by a poltergeist called Paulie, who was trapped within a VHS tape by a team of game developers for no reason and thus made him hell-bent in haunting the house of whichever person that rented him.

Buzz, Dooley's nephew, reveals that Dooley's sister Patricia had rented the tape from Indian Burial Ground Video Rentals Inc., but failed to notice it as she had been busy with the dinner's preparations. As the VHS cannot be manually ejected nor unplugged (As Paulie shocks any who attempt), McQueen and Dooley set out to find the remote control, finding it within the pantry that became a void portal to the Darkside. Using a line of sausages and sheets, McQueen successfully grabs the remote and ejects the tape, but Paulie's influence remains within. McQueen and Dooley use cooked garlic's juices to cleanse the VHS tape of evil influence and put it back in to frighten Paulie away from the house.

With the spirit gone, McQueen and Dooley can finally rejoice for dinner.

=== "Baits Motel" ===
At Dooley's birthday, McQueen takes him for an off-road trip (Which he lies to Chief Scully that they're headed off-town due to an El Chupacabra appearance) and both arrive at the Baits Motel to see the main attraction which is the salvaged material from Lake Monster stored at the "Trout of This World" museum. However, as they book their rooms for the motel, leave their luggage and head to the attraction itself, they find it closed under a localized sandstorm, which McQueen decides to investigate about.

Using a carnival truck to block the sandstorm on the way, McQueen and Dooley come across Jamie, the Bloodwolves' camp kiosk attendant, who informs them the sandstorm began after a fisherman briefly passed by the museum and then left. As McQueen and Dooley dig through and enter the museum, they find an open genie lamp with a recorded message that he's away, leading McQueen and Dooley to start looking for the genie itself. They find it at the company of a German tourist named Otto, who released him as to wish the 'greatest lake junk' in the world to collect, but nothing else. The genie itself, named Ash, informs he cannot return to his lamp until all three wishes are fulfilled.

Seeking for guidance, McQueen drinks a 'spiritual mix' (made out of trashed energy drink cans and Dooley's protein supplements) amidst the desert where he comes across an Incan-like temple inhabited by bodybuilding werewolves. After aiding them in switching their bench weights, McQueen and Dooley suddenly lift-off to space in bubbles where they come across special stamps from "Fed-Xtra Dimensional". Returning to the normal world, Dooley theorizes the symbols they found must be a combination to release the genie, and suggests stamping them on the lamp, which they do.

Decided to get the genie back in the lamp, McQueen and Dooley start working to disrupt Otto's night, messing with his room's TV signal and sabotaging the kitchen, prompting Otto to wish for food, sabotaging his air conditioner to have him at the swimming pool and then throwing a bag of crows to attack him, having Otto wish for the Genie to save him, and finally ruining his clothing and sabotaging the laundry to have Otto wish for clean clothing. As all wishes are legitimate and had no other way of solving the issues, the genie is released from his bondage to Otto and returns to his lamp, at the same time a mailman ghost from the Darkside, working for Fed-Xtra, takes the lamp away after being properly stamped.

As McQueen and Dooley prepare to return to their room, suddenly Dooley is teleported away to the Darkside, as a shadowy figure observes and it ends in a cliffhanger.

== Development ==
The original prototype of The Darkside Detective was created by Paul Conway and Christopher Colston at a short game jam in Galway, Ireland. The demo was made in under eight hours, but received significant attention after it was posted online, prompting them to turn it into a full game. After deciding to enter production on the game, writer Dave McCabe and lead developer Treasa McCabe joined the team to assist in the production.

During the development process, the team of four would do group read throughs to discuss issues and ideas, with McCabe then creating an interactive version of any ideas that they had using clipart to allow them to further map out how it would work within the game. Once an idea was decided on, the team would then start creating visuals, animations, interactions, sound and music based around the idea.

== Reception ==
Reception

Aggregate score
| Aggregator | Score |
|---|---|
| Metacritic | PC: 77/100; NS: 81/100 |

The Darkside Detective received mostly positive reviews according to Metacritic. Hardcore Gamer awarded it a score of 3.5 out of 5, saying "The Darkside Detective is a charming point and click adventure with a taste for the sillier aspects of horror." VideoGamer.com awarded it 7 out of 10, saying "The Darkside Detective has a very distinct sense of humour that you'll either love or hate." Ted Hentschke of Dread Central praised the gameplay and atmosphere but criticising its short length, saying "If the game were 50% longer, I would be in serious danger of genuinely loving it. As it is, it's just a fun diversion for a few hours." Jimmy Donnellan of Cultured Vultures awarded it a score of 8 out of 10, saying "Funny and offbeat, The Darkside Detective is a joyful but basic point and click game that is simply over too soon." However, CJ Andriessen of Destructoid awarded it a more negative score of 5.5 out of 10, and said "Its lightweight, cornball comedy opts for cheap and easy jokes I never really find funny", although he did praise both the soundtrack and the art style.
