= Gravity Ghost =

2015 video game

- Developer(s): Ivy Games
- Designer(s): Erin Robinson
- Programmer(s): Michael Stevenson
- Artist(s): Erin Robinson
- Composer(s): Ben Prunty
- Engine: Unity
- Platform(s): Microsoft Windows, macOS, Linux, PlayStation 4
- Release: WW: January 26, 2015
- Genre(s): Puzzle
- Mode(s): Single-player

Gravity Ghost is a physics based puzzle game created by indie developer Ivy Games. It was released on Microsoft Windows, macOS, and Linux on 26 January 2015. In Gravity Ghost, the player controls the ghost of a young girl named Iona, who flies through a fantasised version of space (analogous with purgatory) with her friend, a ghost fox. As a living girl, Iona lives on a secluded island with her three sisters, her mother and father. The eldest sister, Hickory, becomes their guardian after the sudden death of their parents. The plot is revealed gradually through a series of animated cutscenes, as Iona seeks to mend a planet which has been torn apart and replaced by a black hole. The PlayStation 4 version was released on 6 August 2019.

== Plot ==
The story is told through nonlinear narrative, this summary is given in chronological order.

Iona, a young girl, lives happily with her three sisters, mother and father in a secluded island community. Iona's oldest sister, Hickory, is in a relationship with another resident of the island, a young man named Arthur. The two want to get married, but Hickory plans to pursue an education in astronomy before settling down. One day, when Iona's youngest sister, Pepper, playfully wanders out of bounds through a hole in a fence, she unknowingly ingests a poisoned mushroom. Unable to find an antidote on the island, Iona's parents rush to the mainland through a stormy night, tasking Arthur to maintain the lighthouse light for their return later in the night. As Arthur waits at the top of the lighthouse, lightning strikes it, shattering the lens, incapacitating Arthur and dooming Iona's parents to crash.

Hickory becomes the guardian of her sisters and now plans to marry Arthur, as she can no longer leave her sisters on the island behind to pursue her education. Pepper has made a miraculous recovery without the antidote. Tensions between Hickory and Iona build, as Iona blames Arthur for their parents' deaths. She becomes increasingly rebellious, befriending a wild fox named Voy and spending most of her time out of the house. She frequently visits her neighbours: Sal, an old poacher who builds a treehouse which Iona frequently hides in; and Eddy, an old woman who believes in a "sacred geometry" that holds the universe together.

The animosity between Hickory and Iona builds until the night of Hickory's wedding. Iona, still angry at Arthur and distressed that her opposition to the wedding is being ignored, runs away into the forest with a lantern. She accidentally drops it and continues in the dark to find Voy, intending to run away from home with him. Retreating to the treehouse where she has stored some food to lure Voy, she tearfully explains to him her plan. Unbeknownst to Iona, he has a family living in the forest, and so refuses to leave with her. Iona defiantly resolves to run away on her own, and begins slowly edging out to the end of a branch where some of her supplies are kept. Attracted by the food, a different fox climbs the tree and begins edging along the branch as well, startling Iona, who slips and falls to her death.

The ghosts of Iona and Voy fly through space together. When Voy flies away, Iona goes on a mission traversing seven constellations to retrieve him. Along the way, she gets advice from the seven guardian spirits of the seven constellations, and reunites the spirits of wild animals with their bodies, sending them properly into the afterlife. In the centre of the universe is a black hole left by a destroyed planet, around which Iona can see her friends and family, in varying states of distress or peril. As Iona retrieves fragments of the planet, she begins to feel remorseful about her treatment of them. She finds out that Voy had a family and that Eddy, foraging for seasoning mushrooms, was responsible for cutting the hole in the fence through which Pepper found the poisoned mushroom. She finds out that the fox which startled her off the branch was Voy's mate, and watches as Sal finds and brings her body to Hickory, who kills Voy in rage. Iona also realises with alarm that the lantern she dropped has ignited a forest fire, implied to be what killed all the animal spirits Iona meets. Desperate to save her loved ones, Iona subtly manipulates their thoughts, feelings and aspects of nature to minimise their grief and to help them escape. Once all the fragments of the planet are delivered to the black hole, Iona reunites her spirit with her own body, which had been trapped in the middle of the black hole. Together with Voy's spirit, Iona guides the islanders and the Voy's family to safety on the coast before entering the afterlife herself.

Years later, the community has gone back to living on the island and have begun to rebuild. Hickory and Arthur have become the guardians of Iona's two younger sisters, as well as having had a baby of their own. Hickory has become an astronomer, and when she discovers a periodic comet, she names it Iona's comet. The comet has an orbital period of twelve years, the age which Iona was at the time of her death. The game ends as Eddy, who firmly believes that it was Iona's spirit who enabled them all to escape the forest fire, hopefully states that they will see her again in twelve years.

== See also ==
- Puzzle Bots
