= 10000000 (video game) =

2012 video game

- Developer: EightyEightGames
- Publisher: EightyEightGames
- Designer: Luca Redwood
- Platforms: iOS, Windows, Mac, Linux, Android
- Release: iOS; August 29, 2012; Windows, Mac; January 15, 2013; Linux, Android; March 14, 2013
- Genres: Puzzle, role-playing
- Mode: Single-player

10000000 ("Ten million") is a hybrid puzzle-role-playing game developed by Luca Redwood under the company name EightyEightGames, released initially for iOS in August 2012, and later for Windows and Mac via Steam in January 2013, and for Android and Linux systems in March 2013.

The game puts the player in control of an unnamed adventurer trapped in a dungeon. To escape, the player must earn 10,000,000 points in a single run through the dungeon. While in the dungeon, the character moves forward on their own, facing monsters and collecting treasure, but their progress is set by the player as they slide rows or columns of icons to match three similar ones, generating melee and magic attacks, loot, keys, and other resources. These resources can be used to level up the character, which can impact how the sliding puzzle is played and its results on the dungeon run.

Redwood released a sequel, You Must Build a Boat, for Windows, OS X, iOS, and Android on June 4, 2015.

== Gameplay ==
In 10000000, the player must help an adventurer (on the top of the screen) fight their way through an infinite dungeon using the tile-matching game shown at the bottom of the screen.

Upon starting a new game, the player is presented with the adventurer character and a door leading to a dungeon, along with several barricaded rooms. The player is also shown their current best attempt and the 10,000,000 point goal they need to meet.

The core mechanic of the game is the dungeon run. The adventurer is shown running the dungeon across the top of the screen, while below the player is given a seven-by-eight grid of icons, with each icon representing a certain effect (swords for melee attacks, magic wands for magic attacks, shields for blocking, etc.). The player can slide any row or column any number of squares, with tiles falling off the grid reappearing on the opposite side, to make at least one match of three or more like tiles. When this match occurs, the adventurer character will gain whatever benefit was matched; the matched tiles are removed and replaced with new randomly generated ones. Most benefits may only be realized at certain times – melee and magic attacks and defending only occur when the character is facing against an enemy, while keys only help while near a locked chest. Other benefits may stockpile to be used later in the dungeon or back in the starting room. Failure to make matches or those necessary to beat enemies will slow the progress of the character through the dungeon, slowly pushing the character off the game screen as the dungeon continues moving forward. Eventually, the character will be slowed up enough as to fall behind the scrolling dungeon and is considered "death", though the character will return to the starting area with all the loot earned on the run. At this point, a score is earned based on how far the character has run, monsters killed, loot collected, and other factors, and added to their cumulative score. Achieving certain scores will increase the character's rank; this rank is used when entering the dungeon to select the difficulty of the run, with more difficult runs available at higher ranks but with larger point and loot rewards.

In the main starting room, the player can then spend resources to buy equipment that can be used while on the dungeon such as a spell to instantly kill the next enemy that is faced, or a key to immediately unlock a chest. Alternatively, the boarded-up rooms can be unlocked with a specific number of resources as to gain access to equipment or character upgrades to purchase that alters the mechanics of the tile-matching game, such as by increasing the strength of attacks made when four or more tiles are matched, or improving the odds for certain tiles to appear on the game board. Additionally, when starting a dungeon run, the player is given a random set of three goals to try to strive for; completing any of those goals can earn the associated rewards for the character.

The game is rendered in 8-bit-like graphics and uses simple chiptunes for its soundtrack. The game's original soundtrack uses the track "LeftRightExcluded" from free Creative Commons 3.0 music released by independent game developer Matthew Klingensmith in 2012. The game, once completed, allows the player to restart in an "endless" mode to continue scoring well-past the 10,000,000 requirement.

Originally developed for the touch interfaces of iOS devices, the Windows and Mac OS X versions of 10000000 are functionally equivalent to the iOS game; the screen layout has been shifted to a landscape mode to match with most monitors, and provide a few additional status indicators during the dungeon run. Through Steamworks, these versions also feature Steam achievements.

== Development ==
10000000 was created by independent developer Luca Redwood, under the company name EightyEightGames. Redwood created the game on his free time over the course of a year. The core idea of the game was something that could be played in periods of two to three minutes, something that can be done such as while commuting on public transportation. Redwood had developed several mechanics for the game but ultimately scratched these, settling the tile-matching concept as it met the play time requirements he wanted despite him disliking the tile-matching concept himself. He spent much of his initial time developing the mechanics for the game, going as far as creating a physical representation of the tile board using cards and adjusting the appearance of tiles to get the right balance he wanted in the game. All of the development was from scratch, and Redwood had to turn to a friend with a Mac OS computer to build the final app before he could release it to Apple's App Store.

The desktop computer version of the game was straightforward for Redwood to produce, as the core game was already developed on a Windows computer, although changing the balance of the game for a mouse rather than a touchscreen was a source of particular difficulty. The Android version, along with a Linux version, was later announced for release in March 2013 and has since gone live.

== Reception ==
Reception

Aggregate score
Aggregator	Score	
Aggregator	iOS	PC
Metacritic	78/100	67/100

Review scores
Publication	Score	
Publication	iOS	PC
4Players	N/A	76%
Gamezebo	4/5	N/A
GameZone	N/A	8/10
Hyper	6/10	N/A
IGN	7.5/10	N/A
MacLife	3.5/5	N/A
PC Gamer (UK)	N/A	74%
Pocket Gamer	3.5/5	N/A
TouchArcade	5/5	N/A
Digital Spy	4/5	3/5

The iOS version received "generally favorable reviews", while the PC version received "average" reviews, according to the review aggregation website Metacritic. One of the earliest reviews was by Eli Hodapp of the site TouchArcade, who stated that behind the simple interface and puzzle-matching aspects is a "much, much deeper game", and considered the title "gloriously hectic". Justin Davis of IGN, in completing the iOS version, considered his experience "brief, but intense", and though would likely not go back for a second playthrough or endless mode, considered that the small price (US$2) was well worth it for the few hours of gameplay he had.

Game Informer's Kyle Hillard stated that the title "feels like a perfect mobile game", offering the ability to play for short periods of time but always offering something more to come back to on successive play sessions. Macworld named the iOS version as one of its App Gem Awards for 2012, highlighting "the whole-hearted embrace of old-fashioned simplicity in design and execution". Game Informer considered the title among the top 50 games across all platforms in 2012, and named it their "Best Mobile Exclusive" title.

Redwood had released 10000000 to the App Store, with plans later to promote the game to various websites. However, on the publication of Hodapp's review, Redwood found that the title was selling at a rate of about 2000 units a day, and with more than 50,000 units sold by the end of the first month on the App Store. By the 2014 Game Developers Conference in March 2014, Redwood stated that 330,000 units have been sold across all platforms, earning him about $500,000. Redwood believed the continued success of the game was due to his decision to bring the title to Windows and Android systems.
