= Prunty, West Virginia =

Prunty
- Unincorporated community
- Location within the state of West Virginia Prunty (the United States)
- Coordinates: 39°06′26″N 81°00′19″W
- Country: United States
- State: West Virginia
- County: Ritchie
- Elevation: 715 ft (218 m)
- Time zone: UTC-5 (Eastern (EST))
  - Summer (DST): UTC-4 (EDT)
- GNIS ID: 1549979

Prunty is an unincorporated community in Ritchie County, in the U.S. state of West Virginia.

== History ==
A post office called Prunty was in operation between 1902 and 1953. The community was named after the local Prunty family.
