= Ben Prunty =

American composer

- Origin: Scarborough, Maine, U.S.
- Genres: Electronic
- Occupation: Composer
- Years active: 2012–present
- Website: benpruntymusic.com

Ben Prunty is an American composer, best known for his work on the 2012 video game FTL: Faster Than Light.

== Biography ==
Prunty grew up in Scarborough, Maine, but now lives in the San Francisco Bay Area. He played in his high school band, and was always interested in composing music using computers. He attended the New England School of Communications for audio engineering before composing the FTL soundtrack. He also grew up playing video games and recalls thinking making music for them would be the "coolest job ever".

He later moved to California in hopes of getting into the video game industry, but found work at Google as a datacenter technician and other jobs until receiving the opportunity to make the FTL soundtrack.

== Works ==
=== Video games ===
Prunty's first notable work was the soundtrack for the 2012 real-time strategy indie game FTL: Faster Than Light.

These are his game soundtrack projects in order:

- 2012, FTL: Faster Than Light
- 2015, Gravity Ghost
- 2015, Dead Secret
- 2017, StarCrawlers
- 2017, The Darkside Detective (season one)
- 2017, All Walls Must Fall (one track: "Synaesthetic")
- 2018, Into the Breach
- 2018, Dead Secret Circle
- 2018, Celeste
- 2018, Photographs
- 2021, Subnautica: Below Zero
- 2026, Subnautica 2

=== Other ===
- 2022, Transmissions from a Hidden World
