= FTL: Faster Than Light =

2012 video game

- Developer: Subset Games
- Publisher: Subset Games
- Designers: Jay Ma; Matthew Davis
- Programmer: Matthew Davis
- Artist: Jay Ma
- Writer: Tom Jubert
- Composer: Ben Prunty
- Platforms: Windows, MacOS, Linux, iPadOS
- Release: Windows, MacOS, Linux: WW: September 14, 2012; iPad: WW: April 3, 2014
- Genres: Strategy, roguelike
- Mode: Single-player

FTL: Faster Than Light is a roguelike game created by indie developer Subset Games, which was released for Windows, MacOS, and Linux in September 2012. In the game, the player controls the crew of a single spacecraft, holding critical information to be delivered to an allied fleet, while being pursued by a large rebel fleet. The player must guide the spacecraft through eight sectors, each with planetary systems and events procedurally generated in a roguelike fashion, while facing rebel and other hostile forces, recruiting new crew, and outfitting and upgrading their ship. Combat takes place in pausable real time, and if the ship is destroyed or all of its crew lost, the game ends, forcing the player to restart with a new ship.

The concept for FTL was based on tabletop board games and other non-strategic space combat video games that required the player to manage an array of a ship's functions. The initial development by the two-person Subset Games was self-funded, and guided towards developing entries for various indie game competitions. With positive responses from the players and judges at these events, Subset opted to engage in a crowd-sourced Kickstarter campaign to finish the title, and succeeded in obtaining twenty times more than they had sought; the extra funds were used towards more professional art, music and in-game writing.

The game, considered one of the major successes of the Kickstarter fundraisers for video games, was released in September 2012 to positive reviews. An updated version, FTL: Advanced Edition, added additional ships, events, and other gameplay elements, and was released in April 2014 as a free update for existing owners and was put up for purchase on iPad devices. The game received generally positive reviews from critics, who praised the game's creativity. FTL is recognized alongside games like Spelunky and The Binding of Isaac as helping to popularize the "roguelite" genre that uses some, but not all, of the principles of a classical roguelike.

== Synopsis ==
The player controls a spacecraft capable of traveling faster-than-light (FTL), crewed by humans, aliens, or a mix of both. It belongs to the Galactic Federation, which is on the verge of defeat in a war with a human-supremacist faction called the Rebellion. The player's crew has intercepted a data packet from the rebel fleet containing unspecified information that could throw the rebels into disarray and ensure a Federation victory. The goal is to reach Federation headquarters, waiting several space sectors away, while avoiding destruction from hostile ships or by the pursuing rebel fleet. The final sector ends with a battle against the Rebel Flagship, a multi-stage fight which results in either victory or defeat for the Federation.

== Gameplay ==
At game start, the player chooses a spacecraft to start with, each one with a different top-down layout and containing a different mix of weapons, systems (piloting, engines, weapons, oxygen, etc.), and crew. The game randomly generates eight space sectors similar to roguelike games, with roughly twenty waypoints (called "beacons") in each sector. The player must "jump" the ship between waypoints, normally unaware what awaits at each point, and make headway to an "exit" point leading to the next sector. The player’s ship can accumulate scrap (in-game currency), equipment (ranging from weapons to combat and support drones and various ship augmentations) and extra crew members by maximizing the number of beacons (and hence events/other ships) they visit, but each encounter has the potential to deal damage to their ship and/or crew. The player cannot typically revisit waypoints, and each warp jump consumes fuel and causes the rebel fleet to advance in each sector, and slowly take over more of the beacons. Once a beacon is taken over, jumping to the beacon will result in an encounter with a dangerous elite rebel fighter, which grants the player 1 unit of fuel upon defeat, unless the player has no fuel, where it will give more fuel. In later sectors, enemies are tougher and have better weaponry but also yield increased rewards when beaten.

There are eight different species of crew in the base game: Humans, Engi, Zoltan, Mantis, Rock, Slug, Lanius, and Crystal. Members of these species can all be acquired by the player or found manning enemy ships. Each species has different strengths and weaknesses based on their physiology. For example, Rockmen are immune to fire and have high health, but move significantly slower than other species, hindering their ability to respond to crises in time. Zoltan crew members, on the other hand, have less health, but give bonus energy to the rooms that they are assigned to, and cause damage to enemies when they die.

The player's ship (left) in combat with an enemy Mantis ship. The GUI along the top, left, and bottom of the screen indicates the status of the player's ship.

Waypoints may include stores (which may offer various systems, crew members, weapons, resources and other items in exchange for scrap), distress calls, hostile ship encounters or other various events. Hostile ships will frequently attack the player and force them to engage in combat. During battles, the game becomes a real-time space combat simulator in which the player can pause the game for situation evaluation and command input.

During a fight, the player can manage the ship's systems by distributing power, order crew to specific stations or rooms, and fire weapons at the enemy ship. Successful weapon strikes by either side can damage systems, partially or completely disabling their functions until repaired; cause hull breaches that steadily vent air into space until patched by crew; ignite fires that can spread throughout the ship and damage systems and hull until they are extinguished by crew or starved of oxygen; and deal hull damage, which reduces the ship's hull points. A ship is destroyed once its hull points are reduced to zero, or defeated once its crew is eliminated. A player victory earns them resources to use in trading with stores or upgrading their ship; an enemy victory results in game failure, deleting the save file and forcing the player to start over, which creates a high level of difficulty. Alternatively, the player may evade combat by jumping to another waypoint after the ship's engines have fully charged; likewise, hostile ships may also attempt to escape from the player.

The game begins with a single available ship, the Kestrel cruiser in its default "A" configuration. Nine additional ships (one for each of the seven non-human species and two additional Federation ships) are unlocked by completing various optional objectives. All ships have two additional layouts (except Crystal and Lanius, which only have one) featuring different color schemes, equipment, and crew, that can be unlocked by completing base-layout objectives. Each ship design and layout begin focus on different game play aspects: the ship roster has designs emphasizing cloaking, boarding, drone systems, and other variations. The game also has separate achievements with no gameplay impact. The game can be modified by the user to alter the various ship configurations.

== Development ==
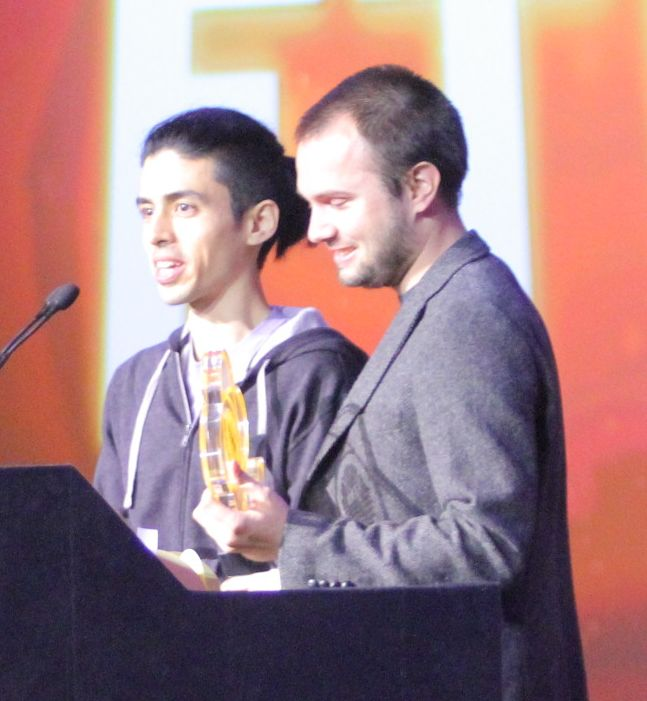
Jay Ma (left) and Matthew Davis, the two-person team behind FTL, at the 2013 Game Developers Conference receiving the "Excellence in Design" Independent Games Festival award

FTL is the product of the two-person team of Subset Games, Matthew Davis and Jay Ma. Both were employees of 2K Games's Shanghai studio, and became friends during their tenure there, playing various board games in their free time. Ma, who considered herself a jack-of-all-trades, had become dissatisfied with working in a larger studio, and after traveling to the 2011 Game Developers Conference in San Francisco and seeing the Independent Games Festival, she realized she wanted to become an independent developer. Davis had left 2K Games early in 2011, and after biking through China, returned and joined Ma, who had also recently quit, and began working on the core FTL game. They agreed they would spend a year towards development and if their efforts did not pan out, they would go on to other things. Following the success of the game, the pair began work on their second game, Into the Breach.

The idea for FTL was inspired by tabletop board games, such as Battlestar Galactica: The Board Game, a 2005 space roguelite computer game released by Digital Eel, Weird Worlds: Return to Infinite Space, and non-strategic video games, such as Star Wars: X-Wing, where the player would have to route power to available systems to best manage the situation. Davis also stated that some of the influences for the game from TV shows and films included Star Trek, Firefly, and Star Wars. Unlike most space combat simulation games, the beginning idea was the player being captain rather than a pilot according to Davis, and to make "the player feel like they were Captain Picard yelling at engineers to get the shields back online", as stated by Ma. The intent of the game was to make it feel like a "suicide mission", and had adjusted the various elements of the game to anticipate a 10% success rate of winning the game. They looked to Super Meat Boy as an example of a game designed to be tough, but not discourage the player according to Ma, noting that there were almost no barriers to the player restarting after a failed attempt; they developed the restarting process for FTL to be similarly easy. However, they also considered that each loss was a learning experience for the player, gaining knowledge of what battles to engage in and when to avoid or abandon unwinnable fights. The permanence of a gameplay mistake was a critical element they wanted to include, and gameplay features such as permadeath emphasized this approach.

Their preliminary versions used primitive art assets to allow them to focus on the game. This helped them to realize that they were trying to help the player become invested in the characters they controlled, allowing their imagination to fill in what their graphics at the time could not. Only as they neared the August 2011 Game Developers Conference in China after about six months of work, where they planned to submit FTL as part of the Independent Games Festival there, did they start focusing on the game's art. The game was named as a finalist at the IGF China competition, leading to initial media exposure for the game. PC Gamer magazine offered an early preview of the game that created more media interest in time for the Independent Games Festival at the March 2012 Games Developer Conference. The OnLive cloud-based gaming service included FTL and other Independent Games Festival finalists for several weeks around the conference. At the Festival, FTL was nominated for, though did not win, the Grand Prize and the Excellent in Design award; these accolades further helped spark interest in the game. Davis considered that the game's involvement in these competitions were important to keep the game's development on a forward schedule, as judges and members of the press would be expecting playable prototypes of the completed title. He believed that the publicity of being a part of these competitions, even if not as a nominated title, helped to garner interest in FTL by the larger public.

Subset Games had initially planned to work on the title for about a three-month period after saving enough of their own money to cover expenses for about a year. The additional attention to the game forced them to extend development – what would be a two-year process – and thus they turned to Kickstarter in order to fund the final polish of the game as well as costs associated to its release, seeking a total funding goal of $10,000. Their Kickstarter approach was considered well-timed, riding on the coattails of the highly successful Double Fine Adventure Kickstarter in March 2012, as well as gaining the attention of top developers like Ken Levine and Markus Persson; with interest spurred in crowd-funded games, Subset games was able to raise over $200,000 through the effort. FTL represents one of the first games to come out from this surge in crowd-funded games, and demonstrates that such funding mechanisms can support video game development.

With the larger funding, Subset considered the benefit of adding more features at the cost of extending the game's release schedule. They opted to make some small improvements on the game, with only a one-month release delay from their planned schedule, and stated they would use the remaining Kickstarter funds for future project development. The additional funds allowed them to pay for licensing fees of middleware libraries and applications to improve the game's performance. Additionally, they were able to outsource other game assets; in particular additional writing and world design was provided by Tom Jubert (Penumbra, Driver: San Francisco), while music was composed by Ben Prunty. Prunty was introduced to Subset through another game developer, Anton Mikhailov, that was a common friend to both Prunty and Davis. Prunty was already ready to provide Subset with some music tracks prior to the Kickstarter, but with its success, they were able to pay for a full soundtrack. Prunty retained the rights to the soundtrack, and since has been able to offer it on Bandcamp. Prunty wanted to create an interactive soundtrack that would change when the player entered and exited battle; for this, he composed the calmer "Explore" (non-battle) version of each song, then build atop that to create the more-engaging "Battle" version. Within the game, both versions of the song play at the same time, with the game cross-fading between the versions based on action in the game.

One of the highest tiers of the Kickstarter campaign allowed a contributor to help design a species for inclusion in the game. One supporter contributed at this level and helped design the Crystal.

=== FTL: Advanced Edition ===
FTL: Advanced Edition adds several new events, ships, equipment and other features to the existing game. This version was released on April 3, 2014 as a free update for FTL owners, and as a separate release for iPad devices, with the potential for other mobile systems in the future. Chris Avellone was a 'special guest writer' on the project.

A new playable species, the Lanius — metallic lifeforms that reduce oxygen levels in any room they are in — were introduced. Additional components added to the game included a clone bay, a counterpart to the medical bay that creates clones of deceased crew with a small penalty against their skills, hacking drones that target specific systems on an enemy ship, a mind control system able to take control of an enemy crew member, a pulsar environmental hazard which periodically disables a ship's systems, and battery systems to give the player a short burst of power at their discretion. Other new features included a new ship, a third layout for eight of the now ten ships, new weapons, and additional beacon encounters, as well as a new sector. An additional Hard difficulty mode was also introduced. All of the expansion's content can be disabled within the game if preferred.

The team looked at bringing this version to the PlayStation Vita, which also would have supported touch controls, but ultimately believed that the screen size of the system was too limiting for the game.

In 2020, Subset updated the Steam version of the game to make the game's achievements cloud-based.

Subset Games has stated that they would not likely create a direct sequel to FTL, though future games they are planning may include similar concepts that were introduced in FTL. Their subsequent game, Into the Breach was not funded through Kickstarter and it is unlikely that they will use the platform in future, as they have raised enough money through sales of FTL to fund future projects.

== Reception ==
Reception

Aggregate score
Aggregator	Score
Metacritic	PC: 84/100 iPadOS: 88/100

Review scores
Publication	Score
Eurogamer	8/10
GameSpot	8/10
GameSpy	4.5/5
IGN	8.0/10
TouchArcade	5/5

FTL generally received positive reviews, with praise for the game's captivating nature and means of tapping into the imagination of the players who have envisioned themselves as captains of starships. The game's approach and setting has been compared to science fiction works; Ben Kuchera of Penny Arcade Report called FTL "Firefly by way of the Rogue-like genre", while others have compared it to Star Trek and Star Wars.

PC Gamer awarded FTL its Short-form Game of the Year 2012 award. The game won both "Excellence in Design" and the "Audience Award", and was a finalist for the "Seumas McNally Grand Prize" awards for the 15th Annual Independent Games Festival. It was also named the "Best Debut" title at the 2013 Game Developers Choice Awards. At the 2014 National Academy of Video Game Trade Reviewers (NAVGTR) awards FTL received the nomination for Game, Strategy (Jay Ma, Matthew Davis) and Game Engineering (Matthew Davis). During the 16th Annual D.I.C.E. Awards, the Academy of Interactive Arts & Sciences nominated FTL for "Strategy/Simulation Game of the Year". Forbes listed both Ma and Davis in its 2013 "30 Under 30" leaders in the field of games for the success of FTL.

While reception of the game was mainly positive, some reviewers criticized the game's difficulty level. Sparky Clarkson of GameCritics called FTL an "absurdly, cruelly difficult" game. The staff of Edge magazine, while generally complimentary towards the game, said that FTL can occasionally be punishing.

The iPad version of FTL: Advanced Edition was praised for the intuitive touch controls, fine-tuned to work on the device. This version has received universal acclaim with a Metacritic score of 88/100 based on 17 reviews.

FTL, along with indie titles Weird Worlds: Return to Infinite Space (2005), Spelunky (2008) and The Binding of Isaac (2011), are considered to be key games that launched the concept of "roguelite" games that borrow a subset of major features of classical roguelike games but not all; most often, as with FTL, these games use procedural generation along with permadeath atop other gameplay mechanics to create a highly-replayable experience.

The game's soundtrack was nominated for IGN's Best Overall Music and Best PC Sound of 2012. It was recognized as being among Kotaku's Best Video Game Music of 2012, one of the Top Ten Video Game Soundtracks of 2012 on The Game Scouts, and one of Complex magazine's 25 Best Video Game Soundtracks on Bandcamp.
