= Natural Selection 2 =

2012 video game

- Developer: Unknown Worlds Entertainment
- Designer: Charlie Cleveland
- Engine: Spark Engine
- Platforms: Microsoft Windows, Linux
- Release: 31 October 2012
- Genres: First-person shooter, real-time strategy
- Mode: Multiplayer

Natural Selection 2 is a multiplayer video game which combines first-person shooter and real-time strategy rules. It is set in a science fiction universe in which a human team fights an alien team for control of resources and territory in large and elaborate indoor facilities. It is the sequel to Natural Selection.

== Gameplay ==
An alien player as a Gorge, the healer class. The unusual alien "mouth cam" can be seen.

A marine commander viewing an alien attack on a friendly base

Like its predecessor, Natural Selection 2 features two opposing teams of players, Kharaa (Aliens) and Frontiersmen (Marines), seeking to destroy the other's respective base. While the two teams have the same essential goals, gameplay for each team varies drastically. Marines largely rely on guns and other pieces of technology to annihilate the alien presence. Aliens rely primarily on melee attacks. Certain alien lifeforms can walk on walls, fly, and dash forward quickly. Players have a currency system which they use to buy better equipment or evolve into higher lifeforms.

Both teams may have one player act as a commander, who is given a top-down view of the map and plays the game in a Real-time strategy perspective. The commander can place buildings, research upgrades and has a number of abilities to support their team (dropping health and ammo packs, using certain support units to aid in combat or building, or erecting walls to block enemy movement), at the cost of resources. Buildings in Natural Selection are designed to aid players in their offensive, defensive, stealth and speed capabilities.

For a team to achieve victory, they must eliminate all of the opposing team command structures (Hive of the Kharaa, Command Station of the Frontiersmen). The Aliens also have the option of destroying all infantry portals (Marine spawn structure) and any surviving Marines; however because eggs (Alien spawn structure) automatically spawn around hives, Marines cannot do the same.

== Development ==
A game engine originally dubbed Evolution was developed specifically for the game. It has since been renamed Spark. The game engine utilizes the Lua scripting language for game logic, allowing for easy expansion of the game's mechanics. Physics support is provided by several third-party libraries.

The game was announced in October 2006.

On December 1, 2006 the first major announcement of a possible feature was announced, named 'Dynamic Infestation'. A video containing an example of Dynamic Infestation was posted on the Unknown Worlds development blog.

On August 31, 2007, podcasts by Max McGuire and Charlie Cleveland were released. These audio updates have since been released at irregular intervals. They discuss the development process, funding and focus, and serve as a basis for interviews with other names in the industry.

On April 6, 2008, Unknown Worlds established an office.

On July 10, 2008, Unknown Worlds announced their move from the Source Engine to an in-house developed engine dubbed Spark. Concept artwork was often shown on the Unknown Worlds development blog.

In October 2009, Unknown Worlds confirmed plans to support Mac OS X, Linux platforms and perhaps console. However, in February 2010, Max McGuire announced that OS X, Linux, and Xbox support would not be available at the game's initial launch. It was also revealed that Natural Selection amassed over $200,000 in pre-orders and $500,000 through angel investors.

On April 9, 2010 a standalone Engine Build became available which included an external map creation utility. On May 7, the Engine Build started using Steam as its primary distribution and update source.

On 13 July 2010, Unknown Worlds Entertainment announced that a private alpha was to be released through Steam for all Special Edition pre-order customers on 26 July 2010. It will be updated throughout the game development and eventually become the beta release. The full release version of the game will subsequently follow.

The alpha test started on July 26, 2010, with those who pre-ordered the game's "Special Edition" able to activate it via Steam. The game was released on Steam on October 31, 2012.

On November 18, 2010, Unknown Worlds Entertainment updated the status from private alpha to closed beta, allowing anyone who had previously pre-ordered either edition of the game, plus the first 10,000 pre-orders after the announcement was made, into the beta. This was primarily to bring in more capital.

On February 14, 2023, Unknown Worlds Entertainment announced that the active development of Natural Selection 2 has ended.

== Post-release ==
A few years after Natural Selection 2 was released, Unknown Worlds turned over development to a small team made up of community members. In November 2015, Unknown Worlds took over development once more, with eight members of the community development team being hired, most working part-time. The initial announcement led to controversy in the community, with one community developer stating they would no longer be working on the game, believing he and others were poorly treated in the community.

== Reception ==
The game sold 144,000 copies in its first week, earning over $1 million. As of February 26, 2013 the game has sold 300,000 copies.

The review aggregator Metacritic shows generally favorable reviews, with a Metascore of 80.
