= The Photograph (novel) =

2003 novel by Penelope Lively

- First edition
- Author: Penelope Lively
- Publisher: Viking
- Publication date: 2003
- Pages: 236

The Photograph is a novel by Penelope Lively, published in 2003. It was Lively's 13th novel. In it, character Glyn Peters must grapple with his recollection of his deceased wife, Kath, after learning that she had an affair.

== Plot ==
In The Photograph, character Glyn Peters finds a photograph of his deceased wife, Kath, suggesting that she had an affair with her brother-in-law. Glyn decides to unearth more details about his wife and the affair by interviewing those who knew her in life. The narrative is structured around Glyn, Kath's sister Elaine, and Elaine's husband, Nick. The novel contains "a multitude of Kaths," as Kath's friends and family had unique perceptions of her that sometimes shifted over time.

== Themes ==
One theme of the novel is that people sometimes do not truly know those who they are closest with, such as how Glyn did not truly understand his wife, Kath. Lively also implies that those capable of harming someone the most are those who profess that they love them. A recurrent theme in several Lively works, which surfaces again in this one, is the idea and expression of identity. A person's identity can be expressed as a combination of the perceptions of others, or "made up of previous personalities, laid down like rock strata over time."

== Critical response ==
A Publishers Weekly review took issue with Lively's portrayal of the deceased Kath, saying Kath's character had "little depth." A review in The Guardian stated that the book was similar to another Lively novel, Perfect Happiness, but told in reverse. It went on to state that the character Elaine was "a supreme piece of character-drawing in the classic Lively mould." Despite repeated themes and overlap with other Lively novels, it noted that "there are some grooves worth sticking with." Salley Vickers of The Independent noted that few of the characters were sympathetic. Valerie Martin called the novel "engaging."
