= You Must Build a Boat =

2015 video game

- App icon
- Developer: EightyEight Games LTD
- Platforms: iOS, Android, Windows, Mac OS X
- Release: 4 June 2015; Android; 11 December 2015
- Genres: Puzzle, role-playing
- Mode: Single-player

You Must Build a Boat is a 2015 puzzle-role-playing game developed by Luca Redwood under the developer name EightyEight Games. It is a sequel to 10000000 and was released for Microsoft Windows, Mac OS X, Android, and iOS in June 2015.

== Gameplay ==
Upon starting the game, the player-character is on a small boat along with two non-playable character guides, who instruct the player-character they must build a larger boat to reach a goal; it is implied that this follows from the escape of the dungeon of the previous game 10000000. The boat is built by having the character run through a dungeon to collect resources and capture monsters. As the player progresses in the game, the boat will be expanded to include shops where the player can improve their character's attributes, select captured monsters as companions in the dungeon, and more. The ultimate goal is to build a boat large enough to successfully complete the journey.

When the player opts to venture into the dungeon, the game becomes an endless sequence of fights and obstacles, driven by a match-3 tile game. As the player's character runs across the top of the game screen, they will encounter monsters or treasure chests, which slowly push the character towards the left side of the screen until the monster is defeated or the chest is opened. If the character passes the left side of the screen, the run is over and the player is returned to the boat, collecting all the rewards from that run. To progress, the player matches 3 or more tiles on the game board by sliding a single row or column. The type of matched tiles will affect the progress: swords and staves will damage monsters and keys will open chests; matching these while not facing a monster or chest will do nothing. Other matched tiles, such as Thought and Power are used to purchase monster companions, while crates provide items and spells that can be used during play. The effect of matches is improved by matching 4 or 5 in a row and chaining together matches. The player may also have specific quest goals, assigned by companions on the boat, for a given run, which can provide additional rewards for expanding the boat.

== Reception ==
Reception

Aggregate score
Aggregator	Score	
Aggregator	iOS	PC
Metacritic	89/100	71/100

Review scores
Publication	Score	
Publication	iOS	PC
Destructoid	N/A	7/10
Game Informer	9/10	N/A
Gamezebo	4.5/5	N/A
PC Gamer (UK)	N/A	75%
Pocket Gamer	4/5	N/A
TouchArcade	5/5	N/A

The iOS version received "generally favourable reviews", while the PC version received "mixed or average reviews", according to the review aggregation website Metacritic.
