= Squad Busters =

- Logo
- Developer: Supercell
- Publisher: Supercell
- Platforms: Android, iOS, HarmonyOS
- Release: Beta: May 14, 2023; WW: May 29, 2024
- Genres: MOBA, hero shooter
- Mode: Multiplayer

Squad Busters was a player versus player online mobile action game developed and published by the video game company Supercell. The game was released on May 29, 2024 for Android, iOS and HarmonyOS.

The game was a crossover of other video games by Supercell, featuring characters from Clash of Clans, Clash Royale, Brawl Stars, Hay Day, and Boom Beach.

In October 2025, Supercell announced a plan to sunset Squad Busters. A final update was released in December 2025 and servers will shut down on December 14, 2026.

== Gameplay ==
Squad Busters is a casual action multiplayer game where the player builds their squad of characters, called Squaddies, and battle monsters and against other players. The player can collect coins to purchase Squaddies at chests found on each map. Getting a duplicate of a Squaddie already in the player's squad fuses the two of them, resulting in a single powered-up Squaddie, while collecting a third of a Squaddie results in a Mega Squaddie.

Every Squaddie have passive abilities, called Traits, and a unique Power move which can be activated during battle. Power moves are manually activated and go on a cooldown period after being used, which the player must wait before using the Power move again. Traits and Power moves are unlocked and upgraded by leveling up a character, called Evolution. Hero characters are special Squaddies that have a different progression system. They do not evolve and are upgraded using Hero Points.

Before a match, the player chooses a Hero character, two Squaddies, and two Power moves to start the match with. The Power moves chosen before the match do not have to match the two Squaddies chosen. During battle, the player has three Power moves, one from their Hero character and two that are chosen beforehand. The player can activate Turbo, allowing the squad to move faster. If the Hero character is defeated, the entire squad is busted, and the player loses the match. Squaddies will attack automatically when nearby enemies are not using attacking other players.

Each match has one or two Battle Mods, special modifiers that change the flow and rules of a match. Battle Mods are chosen at the start of a match, and are unlocked as the player unlocks new worlds.

There are four game modes: Showdown, Gem Hunt, Duo Gem Hunt, and Squad League. In Showdown, the goal of the game is to be the last squad standing, in a five player battle royale. In Gem Hunt, Duo Gem Hunt, and Squad League, the goal is to get the most gems at the end of the match, through a four minute time period. In Duo Gem Hunt, one plays in teams of two players, four teams total. If one or one's teammate is busted, one will respawn after a short period of time as long as the other teammate stays alive. In each game mode, besides Squad League, the roster of Squaddies which will show up in chests is randomly chosen. In Squad League, the roster is chosen by the player before the match.

== Progression ==
The player progresses through different Worlds in the World Journey by collecting Portal Energy. As the player progresses through a World, they unlock new Squaddies, maps, and Battle Mods, and various items. Portal Energy is collected by completing tasks and as a reward for playing matches, earning more the higher one's rank in battle.

Squaddies can evolve into more powerful forms by collecting Squaddies from the previous stage. There are five stages of Squaddie Evolution: Baby, Classic, Super, Ultra, and Ultimate. To evolve a Squaddie from Baby to Classic, one needs 30 Babies; 15 Classics for Super; 6 Supers for Ultra; and 3 Ultras for Ultimate. Squaddies are collected by opening chests, progressing through the World Journey, and the in-game shop.

Unlike regular Squaddies, Heroes do not evolve and are instead of upgraded using Hero Points as part of the Hero Journey. The Hero Journey has several pages with different upgrades, skins, emotes, and other items to unlock with Hero Points.

== Updates and changes ==
Since August 14, 2024, Items and MEGA units have been removed from the game for balancing changes. Players with these existing items have been refunded in coins and MEGA units have become skins in the process. This update also added the Lava World, and added three new Squaddies, Archer, Miner, and Leon. This update also added three new modifiers, Crystal Forest, Timeout, and Hatchling Herder, note, these modifiers would later be removed in the 2.0 update. The update also added new skins, and added style tickets, as a new currency to buy skins and emotes with. Emotes also got changed, as now, one can pick certain emotes to auto play when certain actions take place.

A limited time September 2024 update released 2 new characters into the game, Optimus Prime and Elita-1, a crossover from the Transformers franchise. These characters could be obtained through this event. After the event ended, one could no longer get the characters. This event was brought back in March 2025. This update also added star chests, and changed progression. Upgrading Squaddies now gives star tokens, instead of portal energy. Star tokens could be spent on star chests, for super, ultra, ultimate, and new Squaddies, note, the 2.0 update would later change what can be earned from star chests. Portal energy was changed so it is now earned just by playing battles.

An update, on December 16, changed the way the game was formatted, with four new "overarching" game modes replaced the old game format. The player is able to choose one of these four, and a modifier would be added to it.

An update, on February 18, added another limited time event and game mode, in a PVE format. In the game mode, one collected "hatchlings", small chicks, and bring them to a coop, while also defending the coop from monsters. When the match ended one could spend one's hatchlings on items in an event shop. This game mode and event was limited time and was removed after a while. It was brought back on March 20, and ended on April 1.

In May 2025, the game received a major update, overhauling its core gameplay elements. The update introduced Hero characters and Power moves, and balance changes. Hero characters lead one's squad in battle, and are chosen before going into battle. The first four Heroes introduced in the update were existing characters that were removed before the update and brought back, Archer Queen, Barbarian King, Royale King, and Mortis. All characters including Heroes have Power moves, which replaced spells. Power moves are unique abilities that can be activated during battle, similar to how spells were used.

On August 21, a new game mode called Clash of Crabs was added, and was available until August 21. It functioned like a 1v1 showdown, but players could defeat robot crabs to recruit them to fight the other player on one's behalf.

On June 17, there was a collaboration with SEGA that introduced Sonic, Tails, and Knuckles as playable characters obtainable in a limited 3-week event. A temporary modifier also introduced Doctor Eggman and his Badnik robots as enemies. This same update added Spike from Brawl Stars as a new hero, and the first healer hero, who could be unlocked in a special event.

On September 23, daily win rewards got reworked, introducing common, rare, epic, mythic, and legendary lucky boxes. A new game mode Monster Trophy also got added, where players need to race to 500 gems, collect the monster trophy, and survive for a set amount of time without being busted to win.

== Development and release ==
The video game was announced on January 31, 2023, and then had a limited release in beta version on February 6 of the same year only for Canada and then ended on February 16. Subsequently, in May 2023 another limited beta (Android only) was announced which lasted from May 22 until May 29 available only in Canada, Mexico and Spain.

Almost a year after the last beta, on April 1, 2024, "many exciting new features" were announced for the future of the game. Subsequently, on April 8 of the same year it was announced that the game would be available in soft launch from April 23 in Canada, Mexico, Spain, Norway, Finland, Denmark and Singapore.

On April 25, 2024, it was revealed that the video game would be released globally on May 29 of the same year.

In the video game there are 42 characters from Supercell products and Collaborations, 14 from Clash Royale/Clash of Clans, 16 from Brawl Stars, 3 from Hay Day and Hay Day Pop, 4 from Boom Beach, 2 from Transformers and 3 from Sonic the Hedgehog.

=== Discontinuation ===
On October 30, 2025, it was announced that active development of the game would be discontinued. The final content update came out in December 2025 with the game shutting down entirely on December 14, 2026 (the game will be removed from app stores on December 1, 2026).

On the same day it was announced the active development of the game in Mainland China would also be discontinued with the service ending on April 21, 2026 at 11:00 CTA.

== Reception ==
Reception

Aggregate score
Aggregator	Score
Metacritic	72/100

Review score
Publication	Score
Pocket Gamer	4.5/5

Squad Busters received "mixed or average" reviews from critics, according to the review aggregation website Metacritic. Pocket Gamer's Iwan Morris rated the game 4.5 out of 5. He described Squad Busters as a "good mobile game", praising its simplicity and graphics. He noted "if you don't like Supercell's style then this likely won't sway you".

=== Awards ===
Squad Busters received App Store Awards iPad Game of the Year.
