= Rush Royale =

2011 mobile video game

- Developer: IT Territory
- Publisher: My.Games (Netherlands)
- Platforms: iOS, Android, Microsoft Windows
- Release: WW: December 8, 2020
- Genres: Strategy, tower defense, collectible card game
- Modes: Player-vs-player, cooperative

Rush Royale is a mobile game combining elements of the tower defense and card game genres. IT Territory developed the game, and My.Games published it in December 2020.

== Gameplay ==
In Rush Royale, players use playing cards to battle monsters in either cooperative (co-op) or player-versus-player (PvP) modes.

Players position units on a 3×5 grid using "mana", a resource accumulated by killing monsters. Because the battlefield is limited, players can merge duplicate units into a new, random unit from their deck.

Matches consist of "monster waves", during which monsters emerge from a portal and move toward the player's castle gates. In PvP battles, killed monsters are transferred to the opponent's side. At the end of each wave, remaining monsters are destroyed, and a boss appears.

Players also utilize a Hero with special abilities. Everyone starts with the Trainer, a hero who creates exploding straw dummies to stall monsters.

=== Cards and heroes ===
Cards and heroes feature four rarity levels: common, rare, epic, and legendary. Players obtain legendary cards using magic dust from seasonal rewards or by trading unwanted legendary cards at the magic lab. Each card belongs to one of five factions; weekly, units from a randomly selected faction receive an enhancement.

Players upgrade card and hero levels by collecting duplicate copies and spending gold earned in co-op matches. At certain levels, cards can "ascend" using faction cores to enhance their basic mechanics. At most levels, players choose between two interchangeable talents that fundamentally alter card mechanics.

=== Game events ===
Periodic game events offer additional rewards, including exclusive units and heroes.

- Rush for Glory: A PvP mode where players build their deck and select a hero by repeatedly choosing from three random options.
- Royal Trials: A PvE mode where players assemble decks from their collection. Units lose energy after each battle, requiring players to wait for restoration or switch decks.
- Mirror fight: A PvP mode where opponents fight using identical, pre-assembled decks
- Dragon Rift: A clan-based PvE mode where members progress through various worlds and battles. Clans unlock and battle a dragon at the end of each world; cumulative member victories deplete the dragon's health, allowing progression to the next world.

=== Clans and Clan Wars ===
Clans allow players to socialize, request or share cards, and participate in clan wars and the Dragon Rift. When members achieve specific milestones—like upgrading a hero—they can share the accomplishment in the clan chat, occasionally generating additional resources for the group.

Divisions determine tournament rewards and matchmaking for clan wars. To attack opponents in clan wars, players spend "magic wings", earned through participation, battle pass progression, or clan boosts. Clan Wars offer two modes:

- Daily Battle: A PvP fight against an opponent from a rival clan, featuring daily battle modifiers.
- Plunder: An attack on a rival clan member. Players deploy defender bosses to destroy the opponent's defense, stealing some of their earned points upon victory.

== Reception ==
As of 2022, Rush Royale had been downloaded over 50 million times, making it the most-installed game in the tower defense strategy genre. It was My.Games' second-highest-performing title by revenue in 2022, earning $102 million.

== Partnerships ==
In June 2023, Rush Royale partnered with American actor and boxer Jake Paul for a limited-time event. The collaboration featured a two-week Champion Rumble event and introduced Paul as a playable character.

== See also ==
- Clash Royale
- Clash of Clans
- War Robots
- Brawl Stars
