= Supercell (company) =

Finnish video game developer

Supercell Oy

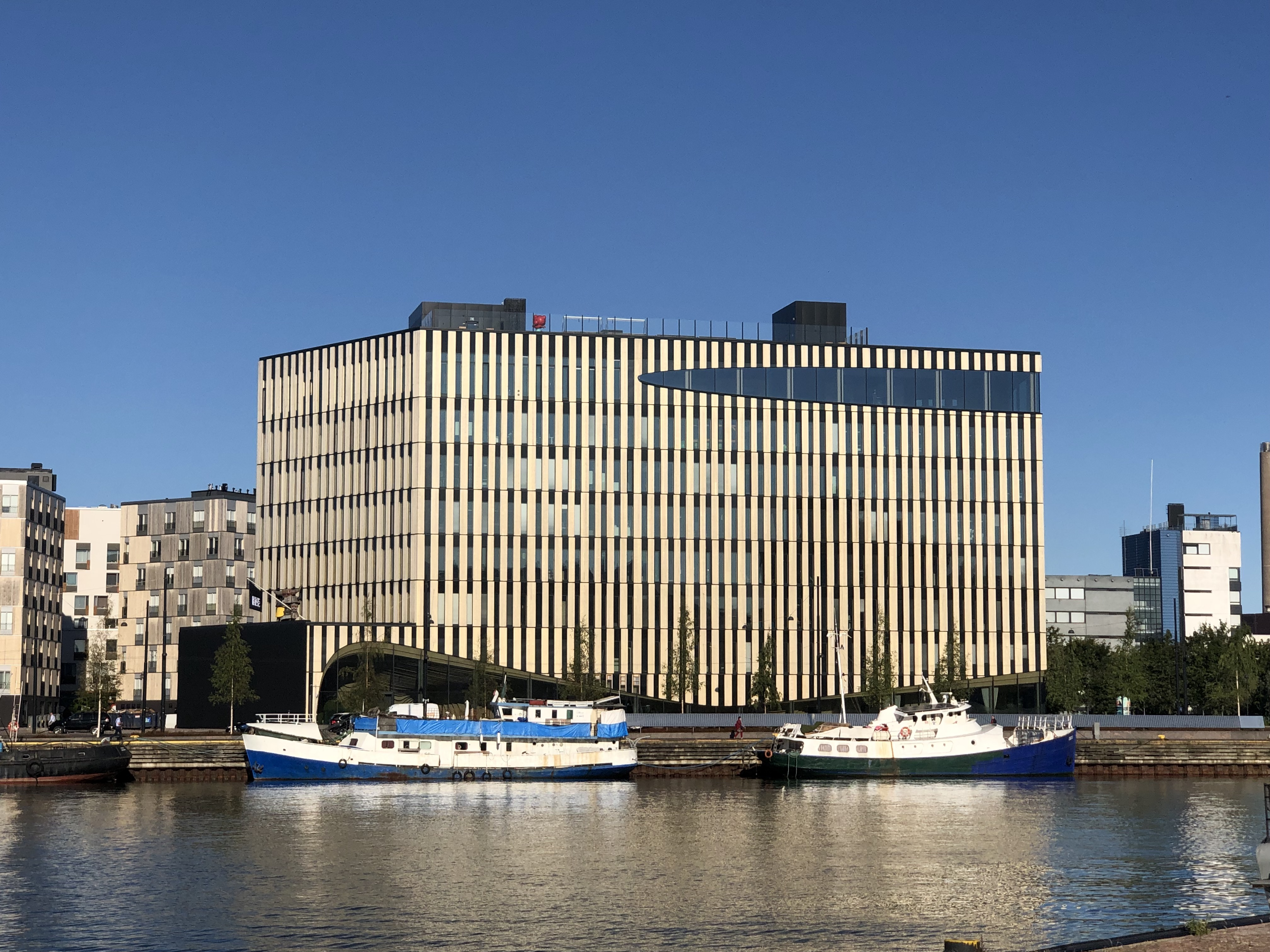
- Supercell's headquarters in Jätkäsaari
- Type: Subsidiary
- Industry: Mobile games
- Founded: 14 May 2010; 16 years ago
- Founder: Ilkka Paananen; Mikko Kodisoja
- Headquarters: Helsinki, Finland
- Key people: Ilkka Paananen (CEO)
- Products: See § Games
- Revenue: ▲€2.65 billion (2025)
- Operating income: ▲€932 million (2025)
- Number of employees: 890 (2025)
- Parent: Tencent
- Subsidiaries: HypeHype; Space Ape Games; Metacore
- Website: supercell.com

Supercell Oy (Note: or Supercell Ltd) is a Finnish mobile game development company based in Helsinki. Founded on 14 May 2010, the company's debut game was the browser game Gunshine.net, and after its release in 2011, Supercell started developing games for mobile devices. Since then, the company has fully released seven mobile games: Hay Day, Clash of Clans, Boom Beach, Clash Royale, Brawl Stars, Squad Busters and mo.co, which are freemium games and have been very successful for the company, with an annual revenue of 2.65 billion euros as of 2026.

Following its rapid growth, Supercell opened additional offices in Shanghai, San Francisco, and Seoul. In 2016, the company was bought out by Chinese conglomerate Tencent holdings, taking an 81.4% stake in the company valued at €8.4 billion.

== Company ==
=== Business model ===
Supercell focuses on the development of free-to-play games that yield profits through in-game microtransactions. The company's objective is to develop successful games that remain popular for years. The focus has not been on revenue, but on the principle "just design something great, something that users love". Game development focuses on "cells" of five to seven people which start with an idea generation and an initial review by CEO Paananen. The team subsequently develops the idea into a game, which the rest of the company's employees get to play-test, followed by play-testing in Canada's App Store; if the reception in Canada is good, the next step is global rollout (App Store). Successful failures are celebrated by employees. One of the games that was cancelled well into development was Battle Buddies, which had also been rated well in the test market, but the number of players was still too small. The final decision to cancel a project is made by the development team themselves.

== History ==
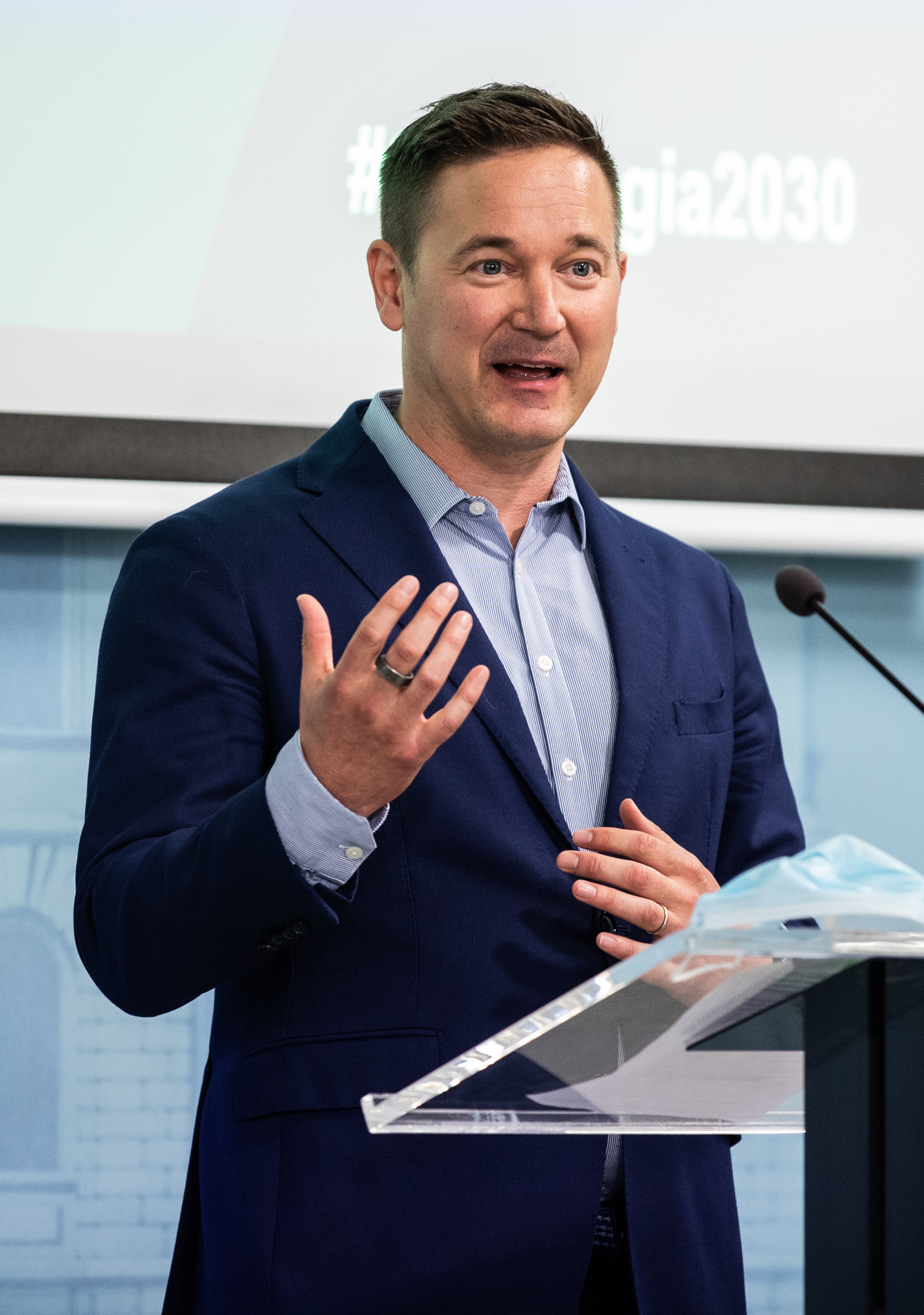
CEO and co-founder Ilkka Paananen in 2021

=== Background and founding ===
Before Supercell, two of its founders, Mikko Kodisoja and Ilkka Paananen, worked at Sumea, a mobile game company. Kodisoja co-founded Sumea in 1999, and Paananen was hired as the company's CEO in 2000. In 2003, Sumea made a profit of €1.2 million. In the following year, the American Digital Chocolate bought Sumea and made it the company's Finnish headquarters and Paananen the European manager. Kodisoja, the firm's creative director, left the company in 2010, followed soon after by Paananen.

Paananen moved to a venture capital company Lifeline Ventures, but wanted to create a game company where executives would not disturb the work of the game developers. Together, Paananen, Kodisoja, Petri Styrman, Lassi Leppinen, Visa Forstén, and Niko Derome, who had all known each other through work connections, founded Supercell in 2010. The company started its business in the Niittykumpu district of Espoo.

Kodisoja and Paananen invested €250,000 in the company. Tekes, the Finnish funding agency for technology innovation, loaned them a further €400,000 and Lifeline Ventures also invested in Supercell. The following October, Supercell raised €750,000 through seed funding, including from London Venture Partners and Initial Capital. The first game that Supercell started to develop was the massive multiplayer online game Gunshine that could be played on Facebook with a browser or on mobile platforms. The game prototype was ready in eight months. After Gunshine's completion, Accel Partners also invested €8 million in the company in May 2011, and shareholder Kevin Comolli became a member of Supercell's board of directors. Accel also invested in Rovio, among others.

=== Change of strategies ===
In November 2011, Supercell abandoned Gunshine for three reasons: it did not interest players for long enough, it was too difficult to play, and the mobile version did not work as well as the browser version. At best, the game had approximately half a million players. Supercell considered Zynga's market leadership in games on the Facebook platform insurmountable and so decided to focus on iPad games, cancelling a Facebook game it was developing. In order to ease concerns of Supercell's investors due to the change of direction, Paananen increased the level of detail in progress reports.

The company simultaneously developed five games, and the first to be released for public testing was Pets vs Orcs. This game and Tower were abandoned. In May 2012, Hay Day was published and eventually became Supercell's first internationally released game. Hay Day was Supercell's version of Zynga's successful Facebook game FarmVille, an easy-to-play farm simulator. Supercell added to their farming simulator the ability to refine products, a production chain, and touch-screen properties. The social aspect of the game was emphasised as well. In four months, the game became one of the most profitable games in Apple's App Store in the US, and was one of the most profitable in the world for two and a half years. The game received regular updates and was maintained by a team of 14 people.

=== Development of Clash of Clans ===
Lasse Louhento had started at Bloodhouse, and Lassi Leppinen was the chief programmer at Sumea and Digital Chocolate. Their team had spent months on a fantasy themed Facebook game when Supercell changed strategies. Leppinen and Louhento wanted to make a strategy game that would use a touch screen so playing would be as simple and pleasant as possible. The development of Clash of Clans took six months, and the game was released on 2 August 2012. In three months, it became the most profitable app in the US. According to App Annie, in the years 2013 and 2014 Clash of Clans was the most profitable mobile game in the world. The eponymous battle between the clans was added to the game as late as 2014.

In summer 2013, Supercell began a marketing collaboration with the Japanese video game company GungHo: the companies cross-marketed each other's games in their own markets. As a result, Clash of Clans became one of the most downloaded apps in Japan. GungHo's chairman of the board Taizo Son flew to Finland to thank Paananen and later introduced him to his brother Masayoshi Son, the CEO of the SoftBank Corporation. Soon, they proposed a corporate acquisition which indeed happened on 7 October 2013. SoftBank and GungHo bought 51% of Supercell's shares for 1.1 billion euros, which is the largest price for a Finnish private company in history. In six months, Supercell's value had tripled, due to the company's sale of 16.7% of its shares for 100 million euros in the spring of 2013.

=== Development of games after Clash of Clans ===
Both Clash of Clans and Hay Day were released in summer 2012, and Supercell did not release a new game in almost two years. The design of the third game, Boom Beach, began in the autumn of 2012, and it was released in 2014. The new strategy game was released in the test market at the end of 2013, after which it went through large changes. The game was very successful in the US right after its release in March, but it did not stay at the top of the download charts for very long. However, it rose to the top 30 most downloaded iPhone apps after Supercell started an expensive marketing campaign in December 2014. In 2015, the game surpassed Hay Day in the charts.

In March 2016, Supercell released its fourth supported game, Clash Royale, which uses similar characters from Clash of Clans. Between the releases of Boom Beach and Clash Royale, Supercell had discontinued multiple game projects, two in their test release phase. One of them was Smash Land, which had been developed by four to five people for 10 months.

In December 2018, Supercell released Brawl Stars globally, which was their fifth supported game and took 18 months to develop from its original release.

On 15 December 2021, Supercell announced that they were opening a new game studio in North America to make games for other platforms like PC and consoles.

Subsequent years saw Supercell experiment with multiple new projects, though many were discontinued during development. On 29 May 2024, Supercell launched Squad Busters, its first globally released new title in over five years. The game combines characters from established Supercell franchises, such as Clash of Clans and Brawl Stars, in fast-paced 10-player matches focused on collecting gems. Squad Busters amassed over 40 million pre-registrations prior to launch and topped download charts in over 120 countries. Despite surpassing $100 million in revenue within months and winning Apple's Game of the Year award, its performance was considered mixed within Supercell due to challenges in scaling player engagement and retention relative to their greatest hits.

On 23 March 2023, in response to the Russian invasion of Ukraine, Supercell suspended service for players in Russia and Belarus. As of 2026, the services are still suspended.

=== Funding ===
Accel Partners and Index Ventures invested $12 million in the Series A of Supercell in 2011. In October 2013 it was announced that the Japanese company GungHo Online Entertainment and its parent SoftBank had acquired 51% of the company for a reported $1.51 billion. On 1 June 2015, SoftBank acquired an additional 22.7% stake in Supercell, which brought their total stake to 73.2% of the company and made them the sole external shareholder. In 2016, Supercell reported annual revenues of around €2.11 billion. In three years, the company's revenues have grown a total of 800 percent, from €78.4 million in 2012. In 2024, Supercell had revenues of $3 billion.

=== Ownership ===
In June 2016, Halti S.A., a Luxembourg-based consortium founded that month, acquired 81.4% of Supercell for $8.6 billion. At the time, Japan's SoftBank valued Supercell at $10.2 billion. Halti S.A. was 50%-owned by Chinese technology company Tencent; in October 2019, Tencent increased its stake in the consortium to 51.2% by acquiring shares worth $40 million as part of a convertible bond.

=== Subsidiaries ===
In 2016, Supercell acquired 51% of Frogmind, developer of Badland. They would later rebrand as HypeHype in 2021, with Supercell investing an extra €13 million to fund development.

In 2017, Supercell acquired 60% of Space Ape Games, a mobile game developer based in London. In February 2021, it was announced that Space Ape would collaborate with Supercell to make Beatstar, which led to Supercell ID becoming available on Beatstar. In late 2021, Space Ape developed Boom Beach: Frontlines, a spin-off of Boom Beach with Supercell. It was soft-launched in Canada on 19 October 2021 and was released to selected countries. On 30 November 2022, the game was announced to be discontinued with servers shutting down in January 2023.

Supercell acquired the rest of Space Ape in late 2024, absorbing several Space Ape employees into Supercell's London office while laying off others.

== Games ==
Title	Year	Availability	Description
Gunshine.net (later Zombies Online)	2011	Discontinued	Gunshine.net (later known as Zombies Online) was Supercell's first game and only non-mobile game. It was a browser game that was released in 2011. The servers were shut down on 30 November 2012.
Pets vs Orcs	2012	Discontinued	Pets vs Orcs was the company's first mobile game. It was downloadable for a little over a month in 2012.
Battle Buddies	2012	Discontinued	The company's second mobile game, Battle Buddies, was soft-launched in a number of countries in 2012, but was discontinued later in the same year. The game was pulled out of market due to poor monetization, despite gaining positive reviews from critics.
Hay Day	2012 (iOS) and 2013 (Android)	Available	On 21 June 2012, Supercell released Hay Day on iOS and on 20 November 2013 on Android.
Clash of Clans	2012 (iOS) and 2013 (Android)	Available	On 2 August 2012, Supercell worldwide released Clash of Clans on iOS and on 7 October 2013 on Android. The online strategy game where players build defenses and train troops to attack other players' bases, is the top grossing app of iOS and Android of all time. Clash of Clans has also received positive reviews from global audience. It has a score of 9/10 by Pocket Gamer and 4.5/5 stars from Gamezebo. It released for Windows on 23 October 2023.
Boom Beach	2014	Available	On 26 March 2014, Supercell released Boom Beach on iOS and Android. On 9 April 2026, Supercell announced that the Finnish game studio Kuuasema had taken over development, while Supercell continues to oversee it.
Spooky Pop	2014	Discontinued	The Canadian soft-launch of Supercell's addition to its mobile line-up, Spooky Pop, was released in December 2014 and discontinued in March 2015. On 9 February 2015, the app was removed from the Canadian App Store and those with previously downloaded copies trying to access the game were met with a pop-up message of the discontinuance. On 10 March 2015, the game was fully shut down. Supercell has since been described as conservative on the release of titles after the successes of Clash of Clans and Boom Beach as opposed to many other mobile-development companies.
Smash Land	2015	Discontinued	Smash Land was launched on a limited basis in Canada and Australia on 1 April 2015. However, on 1 July of that year, Supercell announced on its official forum that it had decided to cancel development of the game. Smash Land remained available for download until 1 September, at which point it was permanently removed from online distribution platforms.
Clash Royale	2016	Available	On 4 January 2016, Supercell soft-launched Clash Royale on iOS and also on 16 February 2016, Supercell soft-launched the game on Android in Canada, Hong Kong, Australia, Sweden, Norway, Denmark, Iceland, Finland and New Zealand. On 2 March 2016, Supercell launched the game globally for iOS and Android. On 23 October 2023, it launched the game for Windows via Google Play Games.
Brawl Stars	2018	Available	On 14 June 2017, Supercell announced Brawl Stars via a video on YouTube. It received an iOS soft launch in the Canadian App Store the following day. It was released in the Finland, Sweden and Norway App Stores on 19 January 2018. The Android version was released on 26 June 2018 in Canada, Finland, Sweden, Norway, Denmark, Ireland, Singapore and Malaysia. The game was globally released on 12 December 2018, one and a half years after the beta release.
Rush Wars	2019	Discontinued	On 26 August 2019, a beta version of Rush Wars was launched in Canada, Australia and New Zealand. On 5 November 2019, it was announced that the game would not be continued, and would shut down on 30 November.
Hay Day Pop	2020	Discontinued	On 16 March 2020, Hay Day Pop was released in beta. The game is only available to certain countries such as Finland, Canada, Norway and others. On 30 November 2020, Supercell announced that they will discontinue Hay Day Pop. The servers were shut down on 1 February 2021.
Clash Quest	2021	Discontinued	On 2 April 2021, Supercell announced three new games in development, including Clash Quest. On 6 April 2021, Clash Quest became available in Finland, Sweden, Norway, Iceland, and Denmark on iOS and Android. On 6 May 2021, the game became available in the Philippines. On 17 August 2022, the Clash Quest Twitter account announced that the development of the game has been discontinued. The servers were shut down on 29 September 2022.
Clash Mini	2021	Discontinued	On 2 April 2021, Supercell announced three new games in development, including Clash Mini. On 8 November 2021, Clash Mini became available in Finland, Sweden, Norway, Iceland, Denmark, Canada. Later on, Singapore, Chile, Philippines, Hong Kong, Sri Lanka, Australia, New Zealand, UK and Ireland on iOS and Android. On 14 March 2024, the Clash Mini Twitter account announced that the development of the game has been discontinued. The servers were shut down on 25 April 2024. Supercell has stated that there are plans to release Clash Mini as a mode in Clash Royale by June 2025.
Clash Heroes	–	Discontinued	On 2 April 2021, Supercell announced three new games in development, including Clash Heroes. On 24 June 2024, Supercell announced the discontinuation of the game and revealed that Project R.I.S.E will use some assets and concepts.
Everdale	2021	Discontinued	On 23 August 2021, a beta version of the world-building mobile game Everdale was launched in Canada, Switzerland, United Kingdom, Nordics, Australia, New Zealand, Singapore, Hong Kong, Philippines and Malaysia. On 3 October 2022, Supercell announced ending of the development of Everdale. The servers were shut down on 31 October 2022.
Boom Beach: Frontlines	2022	Discontinued	A game within the Boom Beach universe - the game by Space Ape Games soft launched in Canada on 19 October 2021. It would later expand into 18 more regions on 3 August 2022. The game would eventually have its servers taken offline on 16 January 2023 after Space Ape Games announced it was ending development. The game was discontinued on 30 November 2022, with servers shutting down in January 2023.
Flood Rush	2023	Available limited	Flood Rush was announced on 29 May 2023. It was available at a beta test from 29 May 2023 to 7 June 2023 in New Zealand, United States, Australia, Singapore and UK, but only on Android. On 24 August 2023, Supercell announced ending of the development of Flood Rush.
Squad Busters	2024	Available	The game was announced on 1 February 2023. It was available from 6 February 2023 to 16 February 2023 only in Canada, only on Android and only for selected participants. A second beta was launched from 22 May to 29 May in Canada, Mexico and Spain for Android only. The game was soft launched on 23 April 2024 on Android and iOS in Canada, Spain, Singapore, Mexico, Denmark, Norway, Sweden and Finland. Two days after the soft launch, Supercell announced Squad Busters would later release globally on 29 May 2024. On 30 October 2025, Supercell announced that the development of Squad Busters will be stopped following a final update in December of 2025, after which the game will be shutting down in 2026.
mo.co	2025	Available	Mo.co was announced on 11 October 2023. It was available at a beta test from 25 October 2023 to 6 November 2023 in the United States but only on Android. On 18 March 2025, the game was globally released. Players would have to get an invite to play the game via a direct link, or by scanning a QR code to get access to it.
Project R.I.S.E	TBD	Early development	After announcing the discontinuation of Clash Heroes, Supercell also announced Project R.I.S.E, a social action RPG rogue-lite that is inspired by it. A relatively more ambitious title set in the Clash universe, it is currently in early development, with only a pre-alpha being released as of 2025.
Boat Game	TBD	Early development	Boat Game is an action-adventure sandbox where players sail across colorful islands, battle enemies both on boats and on land, and collect loot to upgrade their ships and characters. It is currently in early development, with an alpha build being released in 2025.

== Marketing ==
During Super Bowl XLIX in February 2015, Supercell spent $9 million for a 60-second runtime in front of 118.5 million viewers. According to The Guardian, the Clash of Clans advertisement was one of the most popular advertisements of the 61 spots aired on NBC. The commercial, dubbed "Revenge", featured Liam Neeson parodying his character from the Taken film series by seeking revenge in a coffee shop for a random player destroying his village. The commercial has reached a total of 165 million views on the game's official YouTube channel so far, and it was the most watched commercial on YouTube in 2015. Despite the success of the commercial, Supercell has seen only a marginal increase in downloads following the advertisement. In 2020, Supercell collaborated with an animation production studio Psyop, produced a short film Lost & Crowned, was uploaded on 12 September 2020 and qualified for Oscars recognition in December.

== Accolades ==
In 2012, Supercell was awarded as the best Nordic start-up company and chosen as the Finnish game developer of the year. The following year, Supercell won the Finnish Teknologiakasvattaja 2013 (Technology Educator 2013) contest, and the company was chosen as the software entrepreneur of the year. In 2014, the research and consultancy agency T-Media chose Supercell as Finland's most reputable company in their Luottamus&Maine (Trust&Reputation) report. In 2025, Supercell was dubbed Best Developer at the Pocket Gamer Mobile Games Awards 2025.
