= Byre (YouTuber) =

YouTuber

- Born: 29 December 1998 (age 26); Madrid, Spain
- Occupation: YouTuber

YouTube information
- Channel: Byre
- Years active: 2013–present
- Genre: Vlogs
- Subscribers: 779 thousand
- Views: 73.9 million
- Last updated: 4 September 2024
- Website: byre.business

Byre is a Spanish YouTuber who makes videos about sneakers and fashion. He also creates content on other social networks such as Instagram, X, Twitch, and TikTok.

== Early life ==
Byre was born on December 29, 1998.

== Career ==
He started his YouTube channel on September 16, 2013, and at the end of 2019 he launched a clothing brand called classified.

=== YouTube Channel ===
Byre started on YouTube by uploading videos of games like Call of Duty or Clash Royale, with which he surpassed 100,000 subscribers. After a one-year hiatus due to studies and work he changed the content of his channel which led more than 550,000 people to become subscribers. The most outstanding series of his channel are the batallas de outfits, which the Spanish press has echoed on several occasions.

=== Social media ===
His content on other social networks also revolves around the topics of sneakers and fashion.
