= Everdale =

Discontinued village-building mobile game

- Google Play icon
- Developer: Supercell
- Publisher: Supercell
- Platforms: Android; iOS
- Release: 23 August 2021
- Genre: Village-building game
- Mode: Multiplayer

Everdale was a free-to-play village-building mobile game from Supercell that was in beta from 23 August 2021 to 31 October 2022. It was available in Canada, Switzerland, United Kingdom, Nordics, Australia, New Zealand, Singapore, Hong Kong, Philippines and Malaysia.

== Gameplay ==
Everdale was a fantasy village-building and farming co-operative multiplayer game based on player cooperation. Each player had their own "village" in which they could build and upgrade buildings, and their village was in a "valley" that was unlocked after reaching level four. Each valley had up to ten other player's villagers and, similar to the village, buildings could be built or upgraded. Every player had "villagers" that they could assign to either collect resources from the village or the valley, or level up villager skills. Harvesting resources or exchanging them for other resources to further upgrade resource production was the main gameplay loop.

Each villager had a home; the player started with two villagers and had to research any further homes in the research tree to unlock more villagers. After a home was researched and built the player could choose one of three villagers to inhabit it. Each villager could only work on one task at a time, so unlocking more villagers always allows for faster resource production. Villager working speed could be boosted temporarily by potions or nectar, or boosted permanently by upgrading them at guilds.

=== Resources ===
Different resources could be researched through the research tree. Resources were divided into two types: primary and secondary resources. Primary resources were required to progress in the game, and were either needed for construction in the village or for the production of other primary resources. Primary resources included soup, wood, clay, stone, planks and bricks. Secondary resources were not required to progress in the game. They may be needed for valley construction, but as players contributed to valley tasks together no individual player needed them unlocked to progress.

== Development ==
Everdale was initially released in late 2020 as Valleys & Villages under the developer name "Osmium Interactive" as an alpha test. It was later released as beta in certain regions on August 23, 2021. On 3 October 2022 it was announced that the game was being shut down at the end of the month. On 31 October 2022 the game was closed on 10:00 (am) UTC. On January 26 2023, Supercell announced on Twitter that they will be transferring ownership of the game to Metacore, which will address the production and publishing in the future. In late 2024, Metacore ceased development on Everdale and returned the intellectual property back to Supercell.

== Reception ==
Sumant Meena of Pocket Gamer described Everdale as "simple, yet exciting."
