= My.Games =

Dutch video game publisher and developer

- Industry: Video games
- Founded: 2019; 7 years ago
- Headquarters: Amsterdam, Netherlands
- Key people: Elena Grigorian (CEO); Valeria Chebotareva (CFO)
- Products: Software, video games
- Owner: Elena Grigorian, Denis Savuta, Georgy Nurislamov
- Number of employees: 1800 (as of 2020)
- Parent: Mail.ru Group (2019–2022)
- Divisions: Knights Peak Interactive, AdsAdvisor
- Website: my.games

My.Games (styled as MY.GAMES) is a Dutch video game publisher and developer headquartered in Amsterdam, Netherlands. Some of the company's titles include War Robots, Rush Royale, Hustle Castle, Left to Survive, Zero City, Warface, and Tacticool.

== History ==
In 2016, the company acquired mobile developer Pixonic. In 2017, an investment division Mail.ru Games Ventures (MRGV) was set up as part of the company's gaming department. Mail.ru Group unified its gaming assets under the My.Games brand on May 30, 2019. In 2020 MRGV was renamed to My.Games Venture Capital (MGVC). In October 2020, My.Games became a major shareholder of Deus Craft and its current flagship product Grand Hotel Mania, released in July 2020.

In October 2022, VK sold My.Games to Aleksander Chachava for $642 million, managing director of Leta Capital. In December, My.Games announced it was leaving the Russian market. In an announcement issued by its Amsterdam headquarters, the publisher said all Russian revenue-generating operations will be separated into a new independent entity which will have no affiliation with My.Games.

In September 2023, My.Games announced that Elena Grigorian has been appointed as CEO, advancing from previous roles with the company as chief marketing officer and chief strategy officer.

In June 2024, My.Games launched a new publishing label division Knights Peak Interactive to distribute premium titles such as Starship Troopers: Extermination, Mandragora, Nikoderiko: The Magical World, Tempest Rising, and Hela.

In July 2024, Dutch news program Nieuwsuur accused Boosty, a donation platform linked to My.Games, having been used to circumvent sanctions against Russia during the Russian invasion in Ukraine. Boosty's operator, CEBC, responded by banning the implicated accounts, while My.Games stated the report contained false information. On June 30, 2024, My.Games announced the divestment of Boosty to investor Pavel Kharaneka.

In May 2025, My.Games launched AdsAdvisor, a marketing analytics platform originally developed to support the company’s mobile products. The platform provides tools for campaign analysis, user acquisition automation, and creative workflow management.

In November 2026, My.Games announced a management buyout from its sole shareholder, Alexander Chachava and signing of a definitive agreement for the acquisition. The buyout was led by CEO Elena Grigorian and COO Denis Savuta, with backing from UAE-based private investor Georgy Nurislamov. Completion of the transaction is expected by the end of 2026.

== Studios ==
=== Pixonic ===
Pixonic is a video game development studio based in Limassol, Cyprus, best known for developing War Robots.. The company was founded in 2009 by Elena Masolova and originally focused on social network games before shifting to mobile game development in the early 2010s.

Pixonic achieved international commercial success with the launch of War Robots in 2014. In September 2016, the company was acquired by Mail.ru Group for approximately $30 million. Following the creation of the My.Games brand in 2019, Pixonic became one of the group’s core internal development studios. The studio later released additional titles including Dino Squad. After the 2022 sale of My.Games and the company’s withdrawal from the Russian market, Pixonic continued operating under the My.Games group as part of its international studio network.
