= Metacore =

Finnish video game developer

Metacore Games Oy
- Type: Subsidiary
- Industry: Mobile games
- Founded: August 2020; 6 years ago
- Headquarters: Helsinki, Finland
- Key people: Mika Tammenkoski (CEO)
- Revenue: ▲€129 million (2022)
- Number of employees: 130+
- Parent: Supercell (company)
- Website: metacoregames.com

Metacore Games Oy is a Finnish video game developer with offices in Helsinki and Berlin. It is well known for Merge Mansion, which launched in September 2020 and is Metacore's first game. Merge Mansion has achieved over 60 million downloads and generated over 700 million US dollars in revenue. Metacore is part of the Supercell group, which is the company's majority shareholder and from which Metacore has received a total of 180 million euros in funding.

The company was founded in 2014 under the name Everywear Games, at which time it developed games for the Apple Watch. In 2018, the company changed its direction and began developing the game Merge Mansion. The founders include Mika Tammenkoski, who co-founded the gaming company Sumea in 2004, and Aki Järvilehto, who is known as the CEO of Futuremark and the Deputy CEO of Remedy.

In January 2023, Supercell announced that it was transferring the rights to its Everdale game to Metacore.
