= Merge Mansion =

2020 video game

- Developer: Metacore
- Publisher: Metacore
- Platforms: iOS; Android
- Release: September 2020
- Genre: Puzzle

Merge Mansion is a mobile game for Android and iOS released in 2020. It is the first game by Metacore. The company is based in Finland, as stated on Merge Mansion's YouTube channel about page. As of August 16, 2021, it has been downloaded over 40 million times. From January 1 to November 16, 2021, Merge Mansion generated $38.6 million. A large contributing factor in Merge Mansion's success has been the advertisements by Metacore promoting the game. The game, which is well known for its advertising campaign, was promoted with ads which have been described as "weird", "dramatic", "plot-driven", "interesting", and created for "virality". The official gameplay soundtrack, titled "Merge Mansion (Official Gameplay Soundtrack)", was released on April 16, 2022. It featured 12 tracks.

== Gameplay ==
Merge Mansion is a puzzle game where the player completes tasks as the character, Maddie, whose grandmother (Grandma Ursula) owns the mansion.

The game starts with Grandma Ursula handing Maddie a set of keys, which turn out to unlock the gate of the mansion. Maddie has to renovate the surroundings by cleaning and repairing everything, or the entire place will be condemned. During gameplay, players merge existing items and spawn new ones in order to clean up different areas of the mansion. As the player unlocks new areas, the story continues to unfold and Grandma Ursula reveals some of their family mysteries.

Players need to merge two items to create a brand new, upgraded item. These items include tools, furniture, plants, etc. For example, two knives turn into pruning shears, while two lightbulbs make a post light. In order to renovate the mansion and progress through the narrative, players need to continue to merge different items such as these.

== Advertisements ==
Merge Mansion's advertising campaigns have received notable attention on the internet from famous YouTube content creators, such as Danny Gonzalez and MatPat, among others. A series of live-action advertisements were created, hiring Kathy Bates as the actor for Grandma Ursula and Grace Rex as Maddie. Bates described the filming experience as "so much fun". In early 2023, Merge Mansion started sharing new advertisements, featuring actor Pedro Pascal. In the ad, Pascal plays detective Tim Rockford, who's trying to capture a mysterious grandmother who is insinuated to have committed a murderous crime.

The advertisements were created in collaboration with W+K and were directed by Jim Jenkins. All advertising campaigns created have been posted to their YouTube channel, garnering more than 6 million views and 35,000 subscribers in total as of January 5, 2022. It is unknown where the ads were filmed, but the mobile game advertisements were set in Montgomery County in Maryland, USA.

The advertising campaign for the game has not gone without criticism. Many have noted the similarities between the ads for the mobile game Lily's Garden and Merge Mansion's ads. On top of this, some have criticised Merge Mansion by arguing that the gameplay is not fully true to the ads, and that gameplay is more akin to Candy Crush in its simplicity.

Some have also noted Merge Mansion's similarity to other mobile games, such as Whispers, Choices, Homescapes and Gardenscapes. Despite this criticism, Merge Mansion's campaign was ongoing on most social media platforms as of 2022, including YouTube, TikTok and Instagram.

In 2023, a series of advertisements created in collaboration with Reaktor featured Chilean actor Pedro Pascal to promote a new game update. In an interview, Pascal stated that filming the ads was a "real fantasy fulfilment, in terms of getting to immerse yourself into an experience, especially if you love mystery."
