= Nikoderiko: The Magical World =

2024 video game

- Developer: Vea Games
- Publisher: Knights Peak
- Director: Dmitry Smirnov
- Producer: Vlad Yakubovsky
- Designers: Slava Bushuev; Anton Zarubin; Artem Murzin; Klim Krivoruchko
- Artists: Evgeniy Poznyak; Oleg Knyazev
- Writer: Anton Antonenok
- Composer: David Wise
- Engine: Unreal Engine 4
- Platforms: Nintendo Switch; PlayStation 5; Xbox Series X/S; Windows
- Release: Nintendo Switch, PlayStation 5, XSX: WW: October 15, 2024; Microsoft Windows: WW: December 5, 2024
- Genre: Platformer
- Modes: Single-player, multiplayer

Nikoderiko: The Magical World is a platformer video game developed by indie studio Vea Games and published by Knights Peak. It was released on October 15, 2024, on the Nintendo Switch, PlayStation 5 and Xbox Series X/S, followed by a Windows release on December 5.

== Premise ==
When Niko and Luna discover that a primordial artifact has been stolen by the nefarious Grimbald, the duo must traverse across various unique worlds with the assistance of their animal companions and take down Grimbald and his Cobring forces once and for all.

== Development ==
Nikoderiko: The Magical World was developed by Vea Games, an independent game development studio from Cyprus. In June 2024, the game was unveiled in Games Radar's Future Games Show: Summer Showcase presentation event with Donkey Kong Country composer David Wise scoring its music.

In March 2025, a Director's Cut update to the base game was announced and was released on April 15. The April update included "refined gameplay, expanded levels, enhanced visuals as well as brand new content including new secrets and much more".

== Reception ==
=== Pre-release ===
==== Accolades ====
In 2020, four years prior to its proper reveal, the game was nominated in 3 categories at the virtual DevGAMM Awards event: "Grand Prize", "Best Desktop Game" and "Excellence in Visual Art", but only won in "Excellence in Visual Art".

Year	Award	Category	Result	Ref.
2020	DevGAMM Awards	Grand Prize	Nominated	
2020	DevGAMM Awards	Best Desktop Game	Nominated	
2020	DevGAMM Awards	Excellence in Visual Art	Won	

=== Critical reception ===
Reception

Aggregate score
Aggregator	Score
Metacritic	80/100

Review scores
Publication	Score
Nintendo Life	7/10 stars
GAMINGbible	8/10
VG Reloaded	8/10
Games Asylum	8/10
Impulse Gamer	4/5
Gaming Age	8/10

Nikoderiko: The Magical World received "generally favorable" reviews from critics, according to review aggregator website Metacritic. Mitch Vogel of Nintendo Life scored the Switch port a 7, admiring the game's soundtrack from David Wise whilst excoriating that it is "light on new ideas" and "performance could be better".
