= Google Play Games =

Online gaming service

- Logo used since Feb 9, 2023
- Developer: Google
- Release: 24 July 2013; 13 years ago
- Stable release: 2025.09 (Build 66390.902601108/190400) / April 20, 2026; 3 months ago
- Operating system: Windows 10, 11; Android 11+; Android TV
- Type: Online service
- Website: Google Play Games on PC and Google Play Games on Google Play

Google Play Games is an online video gaming service by Google for Windows 10 and 11, Chromebooks, and Android devices.

Google Play Games on Android, launched in 2013, features mobile achievements, leaderboards, gamer profiles, saved games and achievements which give XP to level up. The instant play feature is retired since December of 2025. The maximum level a user can go is currently 99, which used to be 50. Google Play Games for PC Beta launched in 2021 with a set of Android games optimized for Windows and Chromebooks. The user gamer profile syncs across Google Play Games on PCs and mobile devices. A Google Account is required to use most of the features Google Play Games has.

== History ==
The Google Play Games emulator service was introduced at the Google I/O 2013 Developer Conference, and the standalone Google Play Games mobile app was launched for Android on July 24, 2013. Andrew Webster of The Verge compared Google Play Games to Game Center, a similar gaming network for users of Apple Inc.'s own iOS operating system.

Google Play Games has received updates over the years since its launch, including a screen-recording feature, custom gamer IDs, built-in games, and an arcade for game discovery. After the launch of Google Play Games, popular mobile game titles, such as Clash of Clans and Clash Royale, have been added to Google Play Games' catalog, with achievements.

Real-time and turn-based multiplayer services have been deprecated since September 16, 2019. Support for these API functions ended on March 31, 2020. In December of 2025, Google retired the instant play feature.

=== Google Play Games on PC ===
On December 9, 2021, at The Game Awards, Google announced that Google Play Games on PC beta would launch in early 2022, bringing Android games to Windows PCs and laptops. The minimum specification requirements to run Google Play Games are currently Windows 10 or later operating system with an integrated graphics card and quad-core CPU that can access Google Play Games beta (previously octo-core CPU).

On January 19, 2022, Google Play Games on PC officially rolled out a beta experience of the product with a select catalog of games to a waitlist of users in Korea, Hong Kong, and Taiwan. The beta rollout continued on August 25, 2022, by making Google Play Games on PC beta available for download to all players in Korea, Hong Kong, Taiwan, Thailand and Australia with an expanded catalog of game titles. On November 2, 2022, the global expansion of Google Play Games on PC beta continued and the product launched to all users in the United States, Canada, Mexico, Brazil, Indonesia, Philippines, Malaysia, and Singapore. Six months later, on April 19, 2023, Google Play Games on PC launched to all users in Japan. Google Play Games on PC gradually launched in most countries throughout 2023.

== See also ==
- Google Stadia
- Windows Subsystem for Android
