= War Robots =

2014 video game

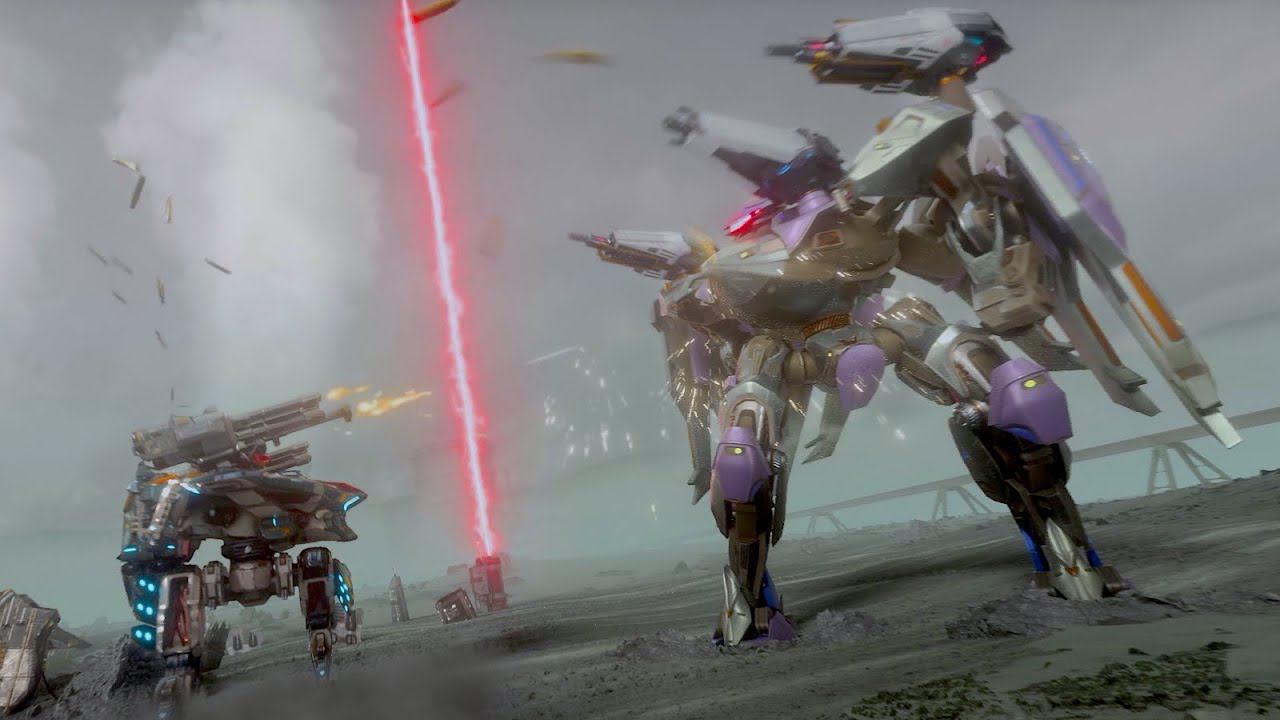
- Developer: Pixonic
- Publisher: My.Games
- Engine: Unity
- Platforms: iOS, Android, Steam (service), Amazon, MY.GAMES Launcher
- Release: April 14, 2014
- Genres: Action, MOBA
- Modes: Multiplayer, Singleplayer

War Robots (previously titled Walking War Robots) is a mobile app game developed and published by the game developer Pixonic. It is a third-person shooter with real-time PvP battles in Multiplayer Online Battle Arena (MOBA) mode. Players operate BattleTech-like robots on a live battlefield. It was first released on iOS in 2014 and was released to Android the following year.

== Battle modes ==
There are currently 6 main types of Battle modes in War Robots. Each has their own goals and challenges.

=== Domination ===
In this Battle mode, each teams are provided with a Beacon bar at the top of the screen (Blue for your current team and Red for the opposing team). The Beacon bar of your and your opposing team will slowly deplete every few seconds, depending on how much Beacons your team or the enemy team have captured. The goal of Domination is to capture as much Beacons as you can to deplete the opposing team's Beacon bar before they deplete your team's Beacon bar. One team can win either by depleting their opposing team's Beacon bar or by "killing" all their opposing team's robots and Titans.

=== Beacon Rush ===
This Battle mode is similar to the Domination mode, where both teams are provided with a Beacon bar and the goal is to capture as many beacons as you can to deplete the opposing team's Beacon bar. The main difference between Beacon Rush and Domination mode is that on Beacon Rush, you can deploy your robot at a Beacon on the map that your team has captured to continue the battle, in contrary to Domination mode, where you are unable to select where to deploy your robot asides from the designated spawn areas. This spawning-on-beacon mechanic allows you to use your captured Beacons as strategic checkpoints, to get to your designated location faster. Like Domination, one team can either win by depleting their' opposing team's Beacon bar or by killing all their opposing team's robots.

=== Team Deathmatch ===
Sometimes called TDM by players for short, is a battle mode where the goal is to kill as many opposing team's robots as you can. At the top of the screen in this battle mode, there are 2 counters which displays a number according to how many robots your team or your opposing team have killed. The team with the most kills will win the battle and if the battle ends with the same number of kills between each teams, the battle will end with a draw. Your team and the opposing team can deploy their robots in either one of the three areas labeled A, B, and C in the map, marked with colored signal smokes.

=== Extermination/PvE ===
In Extermination, the goal is to destroy as many AI-controlled enemies as you can and complete the additional challenges provided at the start of the battle. This Battle mode has many levels (up to 5) which progressively gets harder but with more valuable rewards. The more challenges you accomplish, the more rewards you get after the battle ends. There are currently 7 AI-controlled enemies in this game mode:

- Tick, a small, fast-moving AI-Driven enemy that deals AoE damage to your robot that is within range. Usually attacks in swarms.
- Tarantula, a version of the Tick which instead of attacking using AoE, it uses a toxic spray instead to damage the your robot. each projectile of the spray deals DoT (Damage over Time) and a LockDown effect, which prevents the affected robot from moving.
- Recluse, a stationary AI-controlled enemy which fires high damage homing missiles in order to attack the player.
- Wanderer, a Tank AI-controlled enemy which is commonly found to engage in close-combat with the player and is sometimes equipped with a strong defense-system. has 2 weapon slots.
- Karakurt, a Mid-range support, fast-moving AI-controlled enemy which engages mid-ranged combat with the player. can quickly hide behind cover when threatened. has 3 weapon slots.
- Birdeater, a Sniper which has the most firepower out of all the previously mentioned enemies, but is vulnerable due to it mainly being stationary and having not much health.
- Bastion, a huge, AI-controlled spider Titan which has immense durability and firepower and is able to teleport if it is "Out of Bounds".

=== Free for All ===
In Free-for-all, the goal is to have as much frag points as you can, which is obtained by killing an enemy robot to be the best player when the battle ends. During the battle, you can use your acquired frag points to "restore" your killed robots so they are able to be used again, but it also removes an amount of your frag points, potentially lowering your rank in the battle.

=== Push ===
A relatively new Battle mode where the goal is to escort the floating yellow payload in the middle of the map to the final point, which is found near the opposing team's spawn point. At some areas of the maps, there will be checkpoints, and when the payload ends up there, any robot escorting the payload needs to wait and outnumber the amount of their opposing team's robots that is escorting the payload for a while for the payload to be able to move again. The payload's movement is based on the amount of robot's escorting it. The more robot of the same team is escorting the payload, the faster the payload goes, and when the amount of robots of both teams escorting the payload is the same, the payload will not move and will stay in place.

=== Skirmish ===
This Battle mode changes in an interval of every 24 hours. The goal depends on what the Battle mode available for the Skirmish is at the mean time. Examples of Skirmish Battle modes are: Cat and Mice, TDM Brawler's Rumble, BR Sniper's Delight, etc.

== Notable collaborations ==
In December 2020, War Robots launched its first crossover event, collaborating with Croteam’s Serious Sam 4. The limited-time event introduced Beheaded Kamikaze enemies from the Serious Sam franchise, a cameo appearance of Sam Stone driving the Papamobile, and the return of a Rome-themed map. The crossover included themed event tasks and rewards and remained available until January 12, 2021.

In War Robots Update 11.1 War Robots collaborated with Kunio Okawara to design the S.W.O.R.D. UNIT 190 and other items for the event.

In 2025, the game featured a collaboration with the Swedish metal band Sabaton, including an original song and a special event inspired by the band’s album The War to End All Wars.

== Reception ==
Engadget Android Police reviewed the work, writing "Walking War Robots isn't exactly original - it's borrowing quite a lot from the MechWarrior series, with a third-person perspective and mobile controls thrown on. But as a high-end, team-based online multiplayer mech game on Android, it's also fairly unique to the platform."

148apps.com gave a favorable review (4.5 stars out of 5) for War Robots, stating that "it's an interesting game that feels serious enough to be realistic. That's no small feat." A review by TechRadar stated that it was... "Fun and enjoyable. But needs more robots, weapons and a better reward system. App Spy also praised the game, writing that "The engine powering the game is impressive, even if some of the UI elements are a bit old hat, and the feeling of being part of a squad taking on another team is palpable."

The game's revenue had reached over 1 billion dollars as of 2025. Over 300 million players have installed the game across all platforms, War Robots has an active monthly player base of 4 million as of 2024.
