= Boom Beach =

2014 video game

- Developer: Supercell
- Publisher: Supercell
- Platforms: Android iOS; Windows
- Release: WW: 26 March 2014; Windows: WW: 7 April 2026
- Genre: Strategy
- Mode: Multiplayer

Boom Beach is a free massively multiplayer online real-time strategy game for iOS and Android, developed by Supercell. It was soft launched in Canada on 11 November 2013 and released worldwide on 26 March 2014. A Windows version was released on 7 April 2026.

== Gameplay ==
Gameplay screenshot

Boom Beach is a strategy game that combines attacks on and from other players with attacks against computer-generated (NPC) bases. The game's storyline is set in a tropical archipelago with the player on an island with defenses and troops (similar to Supercell's Clash of Clans game).

Boom Beach combines single-player campaign play as well as the ability to attack other players in multiplayer mode on the same world map. Featuring an expansive world map that expands as the player progresses, the game pits the player against an enemy known as "The Blackguard", a military force who is invading the archipelago and enslaving the locals for the valuable Power Stones found throughout the archipelago (which can also be used by the player to build buff-providing statues). Computer-generated Blackguard bases often appear on the map, and the player can destroy them for resources. Other notable features on the map include resource bases, which improve resource generation when seized and can be contested by multiple players, as well as dive spots where the player can send a submarine to search for treasure, provided they have built it.

The Blackguard is often represented by Lt. Hammerman, a commander who runs several highly fortified headquarters which serve as primary objectives, in addition to occasionally launching attacks on the player's base once they pass a certain level. He also attacks after unlocking the level 15 headquarters and the prototype lab. Another significant enemy character is Dr. T, a Blackguard member who runs specialized bases that occasionally appear as events.

As players progress, they will be able to find and attack other players' bases, as well as bases occupied by specific Blackguard officers (like the "Hammerman HQ"). These bases often offer more rewards for defeating them than NPC bases.

=== Attacking ===
In combat against an enemy base, the player commands a gunboat that starts off with a starting amount of "energy" (which can be improved through upgrades), along with landing crafts which house their troops. Troops can only be deployed on the island's beaches, where they will automatically seek out and attack nearby targets. By spending their gunboat's energy (which is replenished by destroying enemy buildings), the player can provide troops with support such as flares to direct their movement or artillery bombardments to cripple defenses - although the player's troops are susceptible to friendly fire. The objective of an attack is to destroy the enemy's headquarters, as that takes the whole base down with it and results in an instant victory, granting the player all of the available resources and "Victory Points". Inversely, no matter how much destruction has been caused, failing to destroy the target's headquarters results in a loss, with no resources gained.

=== Buildings and Resources ===
There are four primary resources (Gold, Wood, Stone, Iron) which are unlocked as the player progresses, with Diamonds being the premium currency. Gold is used to train troops, explore more regions of the archipelago, purchase upgrades for troops and gunboat abilities, and launch attacks, while the other three are used to construct and upgrade buildings. Buildings include resource generators and storages, defensive measures to defeat attackers, or supportive buildings that provide a myriad of other functions. By upgrading their headquarters, players can unlock more options for their base, more troops, and higher upgrade levels. Diamonds can be used to speed up troop training and building upgrade time.

When a player's Headquarter is upgraded to level 15, Weapon Lab will be opened, but building it requires a large amount of resources. Weapon Lab is a building that offers many choices of powerful temporary defenses and resets once a week. There are 4 main parts players have to look are: Complex Gear, Critical Fuse, Power Rod, and Field Capacitor. Players can find these in Blackguard's bases, Warships chests, or just simply a chest from the Trader. Till now there are 12 prototype weapons for the player to use. Also, the longevity of prototype weapons depends on their grade: I (5 days); II (7 days); III (9 days).

=== Task Forces and Operations ===
A Power Base

Apart from the main aspect of the game, there is also a cooperative form where players can form groups called Task Forces. They can be created with sizes of: 5, 10, 25, and 50 members, which can be increased, but not decreased. Task Forces can gather "Intel" (by destroying troops in defenses, winning attacks, or through special rewards) which is then used to attack computer generated "Power Bases" in various "Task Force Operations". These "Power Bases" are often extraordinarily well fortified and possess incredible amounts of defensive firepower, requiring careful teamwork and coordination to destroy. In Power Bases, the headquarter is replaced by the "Power Core", and in some bases, two Power Cores exist instead of one (both are needed to be destroyed to win). Each player only gets one attack per operation. After an Operation has ended, all players in the Task Force will be rewarded based on how many points the Task Force got as a whole, with every building destroyed in a Power Base accounting for one point, which is called a "Force Point". Even players who did not participate in the Operation still receive the same amount of resources as the other players. The amount of resource each player received also depends on the number of players in the Task Force. For example, a five-player Task Force with 500 points will have more reward each than a 50-player Task Force with the same number of points.

=== Warships ===
A Warships Base

Warships, a secondary PvP gamemode with season and league progression, is unlocked after the player upgrades to Headquarters Level 10. In this mode, the main purpose of the players is to fortify their Warship Base and protect their Engine Rooms in battles against other players. Players can unlock and upgrade their defences and troops, as well as build more Engine Rooms by progressing in a seasonal track called the "Tech Tree", which they can do so by using "Unlock Tokens" and "Upgrade Tokens". In warship battles, 2 players are matched to attack each other's bases simultaneously, with the goal of destroying as many Engine Room(s) as possible. Whoever has more Engine Room(s) left wins. If the number of Engine Room(s) left is equal, the percentage of destruction will be compared. Whoever destroyed the greater percentage of the opponent's base wins. If the destruction percentage is still equal, then the amount of time left will be compared. Whoever has more time left wins. If the amounts of time left are equal, then the battle is a draw. The winning player earns a number of Stars, depending on their rank, while the losing player loses a number of Stars, also depending on their rank. To climb up the ranks, the player needs to earn more Stars than required for the previous tier.

== Reception ==
Reception

Aggregate score
Aggregator	Score
Metacritic	69/100

Review scores
Publication	Score
IGN	7/10
TouchArcade	3.5/5

Edit on Wikidata

The iOS version of Boom Beach was released to "mixed" reviews, according to the review aggregator site Metacritic.

In a review by Stephen Haberman (IGN), he noted that it seemed like a modern version of Clash of Clans, another video game by Supercell.

Despite the mixed reviews, the Academy of Interactive Arts & Sciences nominated Boom Beach for "Strategy/Simulation Game of the Year" during the 18th Annual D.I.C.E. Awards.

== Spin-off ==
A spin-off developed by Space Ape set in the Boom Beach universe, Boom Beach: Frontlines soft-launched in Canada on 19 October 2021 and was released to selected countries. On 30 November 2022, Boom Beach: Frontlines was announced to be discontinued with servers shutting down in 16 January 2023.
