= Hay Day =

2012 mobile farming game by Supercell

- Developer: Supercell
- Publisher: Supercell
- Platforms: Android, iOS, iPadOS
- Release: iOS: 21 June 2012; Android: 20 November 2013
- Genre: Simulation
- Mode: Multiplayer

Hay Day is a free-to-play mobile farming simulation game developed and published by Supercell. Hay Day was released for iOS on 21 June 2012 and Android on 20 November 2013. According to a 2013 report, Supercell earned $30 million a month from Hay Day and Clash of Clans. In 2013, Hay Day was the fourth-highest game in revenue generated, with a total of over 1.2 billion dollars in gross income by the end of 2013.

== Gameplay ==
Hay Day is a farming simulation game where players can grow crops and feed livestock. As the player performs actions in the game, they earn experience points and level up, unlocking new crops, goods, livestock and other features.

The main currency is coins, which are used to purchase production buildings, livestock, trees and bushes, and decorations from the main store. Coins may also be used to purchase goods from other players' roadside shops. Diamonds are the premium currency and can be used to boost production time and purchase upgrade items.

To sell goods in exchange for coins and experience points, players must build production buildings. Each product requires a certain amount of ingredients, which may include crops, animal products, and/or goods from other production buildings. Players can unlock numerous ways to sell their goods, such as through truck orders, boat orders, and town visitors.

Crops are stored in the player's silo, while goods are stored in the player's barn. If a player hits their silo's or barn's capacity, they may upgrade its storage with a certain amount of rare items. Rare items can be obtained through regular gameplay, events, store purchases, and more.

=== Orders and Trading ===
Players receive orders from trucks and boats and must prepare the goods listed in each order. Truck orders appear on a board near the farmhouse. Players can ask other players for help completing them. Completing a truck order rewards players with coins and experience points; some orders may also provide additional rewards, such as vouchers.

For boat orders, players fill crates with the goods requested by the boat and send it off after completing the order. They may ask other players to help fill some of the crates. The requested goods and rewards may vary depending on the order or event. Rewards may include vouchers, puzzle pieces for Sanctuary animals, and land-expansion materials.

Players can also sell crops and goods to other players through the Roadside Shop.Neighborhood members can use the Trading Post to request or donate items that other members have requested. Donating items to neighbors is a way to help one another rather than a direct sale.

=== The Town and Train Station ===
The Train Station is located in the Town area. The EGGspress Train brings visitors to the Town. Players can serve visitors according to their requests; each service building takes a set amount of time to serve them. The Personal Train can pick up visitors from the platforms in neighbors’ Towns or Greg’s Town and bring them to the player’s Town. Players can then send the visitors to the service buildings they wish to visit to receive rewards.

=== Derby ===
The Derby is a time-limited competition for Neighborhood members. Players complete tasks to earn points for their Neighborhood and receive rewards based on their progress or the competition’s results.

== Events ==
Hay Day features several types of limited-time events. Players can use the Event Board to view ongoing and upcoming events.

=== Regular Events ===
Bonus Events provide extra rewards for regular farm activities. They may affect crops, boat orders, the Wheel of Fortune, truck orders, Town visitors, Farm visitors, or County Fair tasks. The rewards vary by event. For example, County Fair rewards include Coins, XP, and red Ribbons, while personal goals in Global Events may reward players with Diamonds, Vouchers, supplies, or Boosters.

Boost Events temporarily reduce the time required to grow crops or produce goods.

=== Task-Based and Design Events ===
Some events ask players to complete tasks and reach milestones to unlock rewards. During the County Fair, players fill baskets with crops or goods to earn points and rewards. The event may last from three to ten days. Players can also collect Ribbons and daily stamps toward additional rewards. Task Events take place on special occasions. Players complete daily tasks to earn event currency and unlock event-exclusive rewards.

During the Design Festival, players decorate a dedicated area according to a theme and complete design-related tasks to earn Photo Reels. They can submit their designs for other players to vote on, then spend Photo Reels in the Festival Shop on materials and exclusive decorations. In Tiny Trail, Truck Orders earn points that move players along a reward trail.

=== Special and Seasonal Events ===
Special and seasonal events may feature unique rules or decorations. During Yard Sale, Farm visitors may ask to buy certain decorations. Greg’s Calendar lets players open gift boxes during the festive season. Seasonal Creatures appear on the farm during limited-time seasonal events and can be collected for rewards.

=== Global Events ===
In Global Events, players from around the world work together toward a shared goal. If the community reaches the global goal, players who contributed can receive a reward.

=== Derby Events ===
Some Derby formats add objectives or change the rules of the regular competition. In Bingo Derby, Neighborhoods complete tasks on a board to form a horizontal, vertical, or diagonal line and earn an extra reward. In Bunny Derby, players complete Bunny tasks to catch Bunnies on the Derby track. Power Derby offers more tasks than a regular Derby, with easier tasks that award the same number of points.

== Development ==
Hay Day was the first mobile game released by Supercell, which also created Clash of Clans. At the time, no other farming games existed for mobile devices. Hay Day took six months to develop and was released exclusively on the Canadian app store for its first two months. During this time, the developers improved players' understanding of features, revamped the economical values of goods, and increased the amount of content to improve player retention.

Hay Day became a top-ten grossing game four months after launching globally. Regarding Hay Day's success, Supercell Product Lead Timur Hassila said:

I personally think that a lot has to do with the facts that we don't teach our players to play Hay Day... There's no forced tutorial. No missions or quests in Hay Day. And there's no "right way to play" the game or punishment for playing the game in a different way. We wanted Hay Day to be extremely logical and thus easy to understand and enjoy. For example, when players collect chickens they receive eggs instead of coins. To get coins players sell the eggs. To get more coins players make up more valuable goods to be sold by combining eggs with various other resources producing waffles, cookies etc. That's logical. You don't need a forced tutorial with spotlight, arrows, and instructions to teach that.

In 2014, developers began introducing social elements to the game, namely neighborhoods and the ability to compete in neighborhood derbies. Former Hay Day game leader Stephan Demirdijan attributes player retention to these features.

== Legacy ==
British celebrity chef Gordon Ramsay had a crossover with the Hay Day for a limited-time event that ran from 15 January to 24 January 2025.

A short-lived spin-off of Hay Day, known as Hay Day Pop, was created on 16 March 2020. Hay Day Pop shut down less than a year after its release on 1 February 2021.

== Reception ==
Gamezebo gave it 4/5, noting its similarity to Farmville and praising the graphics. Pocket Gamer gave it a bronze award.
