= Brawl Stars =

2018 video game

- Logo used since September 2025
- Developer: Supercell
- Publisher: Supercell
- Platforms: Android, iOS
- Release: WW: 12 December 2018
- Genres: MOBA, hero shooter
- Mode: Multiplayer

Brawl Stars is a multiplayer online battle arena and hero shooter video game developed and published by Finnish video game company Supercell. The game was released worldwide on 12 December 2018, on iOS and Android platforms. The game features a variety of game modes, each with a distinctive objective. Players are able to choose from over 100 unlockable characters, called "Brawlers", who each have different abilities and playstyles.

== Gameplay ==
Screenshot of gameplay from the map "Snake Prairie" on the game mode "Bounty"

In Brawl Stars, players battle against other players, AI opponents, or PvE bosses in multiple game modes. Players can choose between different Brawlers, who can be unlocked through the Starr Road or purchased through the Shop to use in battles. Brawl Stars was described by contemporary reviewers as a multiplayer action game with a range of distinct modes and characters. In December 2022, a new progressive unlock system called the "Starr Road" replaced Boxes as the main method to unlock Brawlers.

During a match, players can use their Brawler's normal attack or their Super, a special attack that charges up through damaging opponents or in some cases through additional means. Players can also equip their Brawlers with power-ups known as Gadgets, Star Powers, Gears, Hypercharges, and Buffies; Gadgets and Hypercharges can be activated during a match, Star Powers and Gears are passive abilities. With the exceptions of Gears, each of these upgrades are specific to each Brawler and can be upgraded with Buffies, which are obtained from Claw Machines.

=== Game Modes ===
Brawl Stars has a variety of different permanent and temporary game modes that players can choose from, each having different objectives and maps. Players can invite friends to play with them while staying under the maximum team size of the game mode. Most modes involve two teams with three players each, other modes can involve either five or two player teams.

- Showdown: A battle royale-style game mode involving one (solo), two (duo), or three (trio) players per team. Ten (twelve in Trio Showdown) players battle for survival, with Power Cube boxes scattered across the map providing boosts to attack and health and a 20 Player Showdown as been added recently .
- Brawl Ball: A soccer game mode where two teams of three (or five for 5v5 Brawl Ball) players attempt to score points by shooting a ball into the opponents' goal. The game ends if one team scores two points, or if one team has a point advantage after two minutes, or overtime. Other variants of this game mode were later added, modelled after different sports such as basketball, volleyball, and ice hockey.
- Gem Grab: Gems spawn in the middle of the map, and two teams of either three or five Brawlers (or four teams in the case of Trio Gem Grab) must collect the highest number of Gems possible. A team wins if they collect and hold at least ten Gems for 15 seconds. If both teams have 10 or more Gems, the countdown is active, and the teams are tied in Gems collected, the timer pauses. It restarts once a team takes the lead again.
- Wipeout and Bounty: Deathmatch game modes. In Wipeout, two teams of either three or five (four teams in the case of Trio Wipeout) must defeat 10 or 20 enemy Brawlers. In Bounty, teams must earn 20 points by defeating Brawlers, who become worth more points for each kill, with a blue star deciding the draw from overtime.
- Heist: Two teams of three Brawlers each attempt to destroy the opponents' highly durable safe located near their spawn point, before the enemy team can destroy their own safe. After the April 2025 update, the safe gains a temporary shield after reaching a certain amount of damage, pushing enemy Brawlers away.
- Hot Zone: A king of the hill game mode. Two teams of three Brawlers each must stay in all Hot Zones for a combined total of 100 seconds. The match ends if this requirement is met or one team had stayed in the Hot Zones longer than the other throughout the time limit. A 2v2 version of the mode was added later during special events.
- Knockout: A deathmatch game mode where players cannot respawn and rounds are won by defeating the entire enemy team. The first team to win two rounds wins the game. A variation with five Brawlers is unique in that each elimination causes the remaining teammates to gain extra damage and health.
- Duels: Two players go against each other in a 1v1. Each player assembles a team of three Brawlers; after one of the players' Brawlers is defeated, the player plays the next one. The goal is to defeat all three of the opponents' Brawlers while not losing all their Brawlers in the process.
- Brawl Arena: Added in the April 2025 update, two teams of three Brawlers try to destroy enemy turrets to win, while fighting enemy minions to level up and increase their stats.
- Mega Pig: Players can join clubs or create them to participate in Mega Pig, an event that occurs around once a month over a weekend. Each win adds to a club's points, which increases the Starr Drops they get at the end of the event, with a Mega Tree event during Christmas. Each player has six tickets they can use to play games, each game costing one. Once a player runs out of tickets, they can't contribute to the pig anymore (unless they help someone else in their club win games). On certain occasions such as collaborations, or seasonal events like Brawlidays (Christmas), the Mega Pig may be modified in a different theme with event-specific rewards.
- Map Maker: A mode where players can freely create maps and may apply custom modifiers to various modes in the game. Players can submit their maps into candidates of the day, allowing for a selection of random player-submitted maps to be played by other players, who can give the map a like or dislike, increasing or decreasing their chance of being selected. The map with the most likes becomes the 'winner of the day' the next day. It is featured in a second Map Maker slot available for all players to play for a day.

=== Brawl Pass ===
On 14 May 2020, a game update added a new reward system called the “Brawl Pass”. The Brawl Pass is the game's version of a battle pass. When players compete in battles, they earn XP (formerly known as Tokens) to progress along the Brawl Pass and unlock tiers with various rewards. All players have the free Brawl Pass by default. Players could purchase the premium Brawl Pass with Gems, until 4 January 2024, where the pass and its newly introduced Brawl Pass Plus variant could only be bought with real money.

Masters Rank

=== Ranked ===
In Ranked, formerly called Power League, a random 3v3 game mode and map are chosen. Winning a game increases Points and gives Pro Pass XP, and Point thresholds increase a player's rank. As a player breaks through certain Point thresholds, 200 Pro Pass XP is obtained, which can give the player unique cosmetic items, Starr drops or skins. A list of the ranks as of November 2026 from lowest to highest is Bronze, Silver, Gold, Diamond, Mythic, Legendary, Masters, and Pro. The icons has also been updated from the previous ranked seasons. Twelve Brawlers at Power Level 11 are required to pass into Mythic from Diamond.

=== Pro Pass ===
The Pro Pass in Brawl Stars is a ranked pass that resets every four seasons to link with major Esports events. It offers a structured rewards system across 100 tiers, featuring both free and paid tracks. One of the most notable rewards is the Pro Skin Upgrade, which enhances an existing skin with exclusive Ranked-themed effects such as new animations, visual effects, and upgraded textures. Players earn four Pro Skin Upgrades throughout the Pro Pass at tiers 10, 30, 60, and 100, but these must be unlocked during the active season.

In addition to skin upgrades, the Pro Pass provides a variety of rewards, including Hypercharge Drops, Ranked Drops, and Starr Drops. Players can also collect Gems on the free track, while the paid track offers an additional Gems, along with exclusive cosmetics like Pins, Sprays, and Player Icons. These rewards encourage Ranked Mode participation and provide players with valuable in-game items to enhance their experience.

Players can earn Pro Pass XP in Brawl Stars by participating in Ranked Mode and official events. The primary way to gain XP is by winning Ranked Matches. Additionally, Rank Promotions provide an XP bonus once per month, helping players to progress faster. XP can also be obtained from Ranked Starr Drops, and by participating in official Brawl Stars events. By watching esports tournaments and participating in "Pick-ems" on the official website, people can earn extra Pro Pass XP.

=== Resources ===
Players can upgrade Brawlers' stats using Coins and Power Points. Coins are additionally used for buying Brawler-specific upgrades such as Gadgets, Star Powers and Hypercharges. Credits are used to unlock Brawlers, XP Doublers (formerly Token Doublers) are used to speed up progress through the Brawl Pass, and Bling is used to buy most cosmetics, which was added in April 2023, replacing Star Points.

Gems are used to top off any currency that the player does not have enough of, as well as certain cosmetics exclusively available for gems. Gems are available for free, but the main way of obtaining them is through money. Winning matches with Brawlers and doing certain challenges progresses their Record level, which can unlock Brawler cosmetics and progression items (Power Points, Coins, Titles, and Credits).

=== Starr Road ===
The Starr Road was a former method of progression introduced as the method of unlocking Brawlers, after the removal of Boxes in December 2022. Players could select a Brawler from a selection of up to four from the same rarity (from a choice of either Epic, Mythic, Legendary, or Ultra Legendary) to initiate the unlocking process. Progress is made through Credits, a currency obtained in the Trophy Road, shop freebies, daily login rewards, from Starr Drops and Chaos Drops, and from the Brawl Pass. Players can switch to a different Brawler they wish to unlock at any time, with the accumulated credits transitioning to the new selection.

Once a Brawler is unlocked, it becomes a permanent addition to the player's collection. The Starr Road then presents a new selection of Brawlers from the next rarity tier to unlock. Alternatively, players have the option to acquire Brawlers from the Starr Road using Gems.

Rare and Super Rare Brawlers are unlocked through the Trophy Road after reaching certain Trophy counts as opposed to using the Starr Road.

In September 2026, the Starr Road was replaced in favor of Brawler Blast, a similar feature where Brawlers are randomly unlocked by shooting certain Brawlers of a certain rarity after reaching the required amount of Credits for said rarity. Depending on how much brawlers were defeated, bonus upgrades, referred in-game as Gem Fragments, which include possible extra power level upgrades, Gadgets, Star Powers and even Hypercharges, can be added to the unlocked brawler.

== Brawlers ==
Brawlers have 7 classes: Damage Dealers, Marksmen, Tanks, Assassins, Supports, Controllers, and Artillery. Brawlers also have Rarities, which vary based on a Brawler's concept difficulty: Rare, Super Rare, Epic, Mythic, Legendary, and Ultra Legendary. There is a total of 111 brawlers in the game as of November 2026.

=== Damage Dealers ===
Damage dealers are brawlers that deal more damage and faster damage compared to others. They focus on dealing high damage and winning matches by getting numerous kills throughout the game.

=== Marksmen ===
Marksmen can inflict high damage from far away and usually have lower health compared to other brawlers.They focus on keeping the enemy away and sniping kills here and there. These brawlers thrive on open maps with less bushes.

=== Tanks ===
Tanks all have high health on average compared to other brawlers and usually excel in close range combat. They can absorb huge amounts of damage and are usually played to keep enemies away.

=== Assassins ===
Assassins are brawlers that usually have high mobility and excel in 1v1 takedowns and battles. They have high flexibility in the maps they can be played in, however they are usually the best picks in bushy maps filled with walls.

=== Supports ===
Support brawlers usually have lower health and damage, however, they compensate by their ability to heal their teammates, boost abilities, or other useful effects that help make teammates or themselves have better stats.

=== Controllers ===
Controllers are brawlers that usually are able to deal damage to a larger area or they have supers that have great area control. They make it hard for the enemy to move around freely with their attacks and supers that control the area.

=== Artillery ===
Artillery brawlers are the brawlers usually with the lowest health in the entire game. They can, however, hit enemies behind walls or cover with their throwing attacks and usually deal immense amounts of damage with eats projectile.

== Setting ==
Brawl Stars takes place in a fictional abandoned amusement park named Starr Park. Initially introduced in a live-action short film, in-game surveillance footage showed that Starr Park closed in 1995 due to magic purple gems that granted several staff and visitors in Starr Park immortality, but in the ensuing chaos, gave life to inanimate objects and mutated plant life and animals.

== Development and release ==
Supercell set out to develop a team-based game similar to League of Legends and Overwatch. The team wanted to create such a game that was designed with mobile devices in mind first. According to Frank Keienburg, Brawl Stars' General Manager (i.e. project lead), "Our focus was on retaining a lot of depth while stripping away all the fluff". Although the game contains some elements of the battle royale genre, these were implemented before the genre as a whole took off and the team did not set out to make a game with those elements.

The game is notable for its long soft launch period during which virtually every aspect of the game changed. Supercell officially announced the game via a livestream video on 14 June 2017. It received an iOS soft launch in Canada the following day. The soft launch would last a total of 522 days, during which internally it was doubted whether or not the game would ever actually see a general release. Initially, the game was played in portrait mode and the movement controls were controlled by tapping on the screen. Landscape mode and joystick-based input would later replace them. Other changes include changing the UI, changing the metagame and transitioning the game from 2D to 3D. Frank Keienburg attributes the difficult beta period to the developers working in a new genre where they "weren't sure how to interpret its success". The game soft-launched in Finland, Sweden, Denmark, Norway, Ireland, Singapore, Hong Kong, Macao and Malaysia for iOS on 19 January 2018., with a later Android soft-launch in June.

Brawl Stars was made globally and officially available on 12 December 2018, grossing US$10 million in its first week and US$63 million in its first month. On 9 June 2020, Brawl Stars was released in mainland China, with the corresponding changes to accommodate to Chinese regulations by Tencent Games.

== Brawl Stars Championship ==
The Brawl Stars Championship is an annual tournament, composed of a qualifying stage, available in-game, another Monthly Qualifier stage, a Regional Monthly Finals stage, and finally a World Finals stage, in which the best teams compete to win the Championship. The first in-game challenge is similar to other challenges, where players must win 15 matches in the in-game challenge without losing three times. After 15 wins, players win a spot in regional Monthly Qualifiers, which then give access to the regional Monthly Finals. First introduced in 2025, the Brawl Cup is an in-person event that features the top teams from six regions. The results from this event allows teams to secure a spot in the Last Chance Qualifiers (LCQs) or even the World Finals. At the end of the year, the World Finals take place, which is an event which has the largest prize pool and attracts the most viewers.

The first edition, known as the Brawl Stars World Championship, was held on 15 and 16 November 2019, at the Busan Exhibition and Convention Center in South Korea. The first-place winner was Nova Esports with a 3–0 victory. Other competing participants included Animal Chanpuru, Tribe Gaming, 3Bears, Spacestation Gaming, and PSG Esports. With a $250,000 prize pool, it was the first international event for the game and had teams from North America, Europe, Latin America, Southeast Asia, Japan, and South Korea.

In 2020, the World Finals were held between 21 and 22 November with a base $1,000,000 prize pool. Half of the amount was raised using the profits from an in-game championship package. Eight teams participated in the World Finals, which were originally to take place in Katowice, Poland, but were moved online due to the COVID-19 pandemic. PSG Esports was the winner of that year's championship with a prize of $200,000. The other monetary prizes were split between the teams which won second to eighth place.

In 2021, the Brawl Stars Championship started on 20 February. There are eight seasons for the championship that occur once per month, from February to September. The Championship Challenges and Monthly Qualifiers are each live for two days per season. The top eight teams from the regional Monthly Qualifiers go to the regional Monthly Finals. Sixteen teams from the Monthly Finals from all seven regions come together to participate in the World Finals, which took place in that year's edition from 26 to 28 November in-person in Bucharest, Romania. The prizes for 2021 were $600,000 in the Monthly Finals, and a minimum of $500,000 in the World Finals with opportunities to increase this amount through in-game offers.

In 2024, the World Finals were held in conjunction with the Clash Royale League World Finals and the Clash of Clans World Championship in Helsinki, Finland during Superfest, an event developed by Supercell encompassing the before mentioned tournaments. The 2024 edition reached a peak viewership of over a million viewers with team HMBLE taking first place after defeating Crazy Raccoon.

In 2025, the first edition of the Brawl Cup was held in Dallas, Texas, at DreamHack Dallas. With a prize pool of $50,000, six teams battled for places in the World Finals and Last Chance Qualifiers, with HMBLE taking the crown and advancing straight to the World Finals later that year, and the second and third place teams (SK Gaming and Zeta Division) advancing to the LCQs. The Last Chance Qualifiers were held in Brazil, in October. This event saw 16 teams from 7 regions battle for four spots in the World Finals. Revenant XSpark, Totem Esports, Crazy Raccoon, and Papara Supermassive all came out victorious, securing their spots in the World Finals. The World Finals were held in Stockholm, Sweden, as part of DreamHack Stockholm. 16 teams fought for a share of the $1,000,000 prize pool. With a peak viewer count of just over 211,000, the final included reigning champions HMBLE facing Crazy Raccoon, a repeat of the finals that happened in 2024. Ultimately Crazy Raccoon came out victorious, defeating HMBLE 3–0.

== Reception ==
Brawl Stars Reception

Aggregate score
Aggregator	Score
Metacritic	72/100

Review scores
Publication	Score
Pocket Gamer	3/5
148 Apps	3.5/5

=== Awards ===
The game was nominated for "Mobile Game" and "EE Mobile Game of the Year" at the 15th British Academy Games Awards.

=== Critical reception ===
Brawl Stars received "mixed or average" reviews or 72 out of 100 on review aggregator website Metacritic.

Pocket Gamer's Harry Slater scored the game 3 out of 5. Reviewing the game immediately after global release, he praised that game's progression. He criticized Showdown, the game's battle royale mode, for being the weakest of all the game modes that were in the game. He said that Showdown "doesn't capture the real madness of the genre, and there's a distinct lack of tension since you can pretty much see everyone on the map and what they're up to". He mentioned that something felt "missing in Brawl Stars. You'll play, you'll get new characters, you'll unlock new modes, but you're never having quite as much fun as you feel you should be doing." He continued on to say that "the action is relatively flat - in the team matches you know within the first few seconds which way the game is going." He concluded in disappointment because the game did not seem like "the huge step forward for multiplayer mobile action that a lot of us were hoping for."

148 Apps' Campbell Bird scored the game 3.5 out of 5. She started with mentioning that the game felt "like a combination of Arena of Valor and Overwatch." She praised the game's graphics and the developer's implementation of the progression system to encourage players to play again, as well as the quick matchmaking. However, she criticized the game's controls for feeling "oddly loose and muddy". the characters falling "into pretty predictable hero shooter archetypes", as well as claiming that "every mode in the game is some variation on something you've seen before in other, better multiplayer shooters." She also highlighted that the frequent connection issues and unbalanced teams made the experience of playing the game less enjoyable.

Eurogamer writer Christian Donlan wrote that the gameplay is easy to pick up (even for players of low skill). He also wrote that Battle Royales are all about preying on opponents and with health bars always being visible to everyone, it becomes even more crucial.

=== Commercial reception ===
Brawl Stars has been downloaded over 400 million times. In 2020, Brawl Stars had the second highest gross of any mobile game in Europe. It grossed US$526 million in total in 2020, which accounted for more than half its life time revenue. It was also the fourth game by Supercell to surpass US$1 billion in lifetime revenue.
