= Peruvian Debate Society =

Debating society in Peru

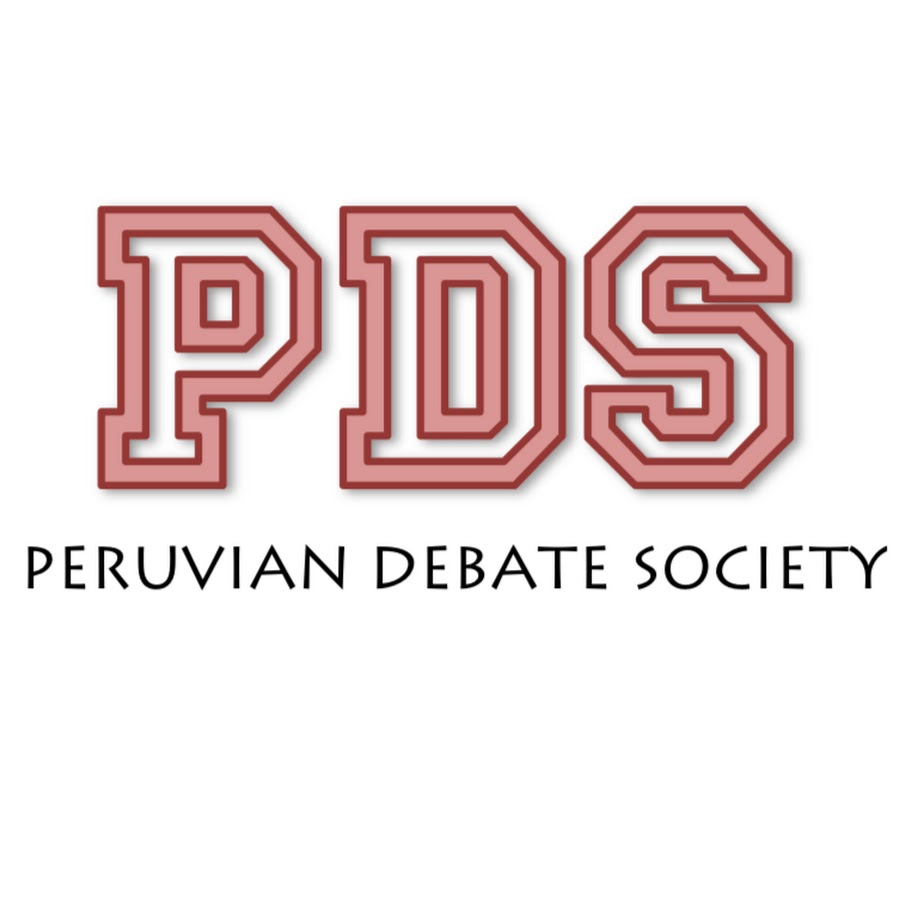
- Abbreviation: PDS
- Formation: 2014 (established as a non-profit association in 2017)
- Headquarters: Lima, Peru
- Chairman: Sebastián Morello
- Main organ: Board of Directors

The Peruvian Debate Society (PDS) is an inter-collegiate student debating association headquartered in Lima, Peru, aimed to promote debate and discussion on current national and international issues in order to form leading citizens who contribute to development by competing in Model United Nations (MUN) conferences globally. Since its foundation in 2014, their participation at national and international level has yielded multiple awards, consistently being ranked as the best Model UN team in the nation and one of the top international debate teams in the world.

In the 2017–2018 debating season, PDS achieved for the first time the Best Large Delegation award at Harvard World Model United Nations 2018 held in Panama City, Panama, being the second Peruvian MUN team in achieving such international recognition. The following season, the team achieved the Outstanding Large Delegation Award at the same conference, held in this occasion at Madrid, Spain.

Having participated at regional level since 2015, PDS is the incumbent champion at the Harvard National Model United Nations - Latin America conference, and is the MUN team with most delegation awards in the history of the conference, garnering the Best Large Delegation a total of six times.

== Governance ==
The Peruvian Debate Society was constituted as a non-profit civil association for the promotion of education in Peru, in 2017. As an organization, it is composed by Associates, which in turn make-up the General Assembly, presided by a Board of Directors (composed of four elected associates).

The current Board of Directors is led by Sebastián Morello Montes, former Delegate (2016–2019) and Faculty Advisor (2019–2020; 2023–2025).

The PDS civil association is formally established under an official Constitution Act and Statute, to which every associate is subject to its rules and standing orders.

=== 2017–2018 ===
Office	Holder	Education
Chairman	Franco Vicente Nicolini Barco	LLB – University of Lima
Deputy Chairwoman	Verónica Lucía Díaz Hinostroza	BA in Economics – University of the Pacific
Director of Financer	Daniel Alejandro Lira Vera	BA in Economics – University of the Pacific
Director of Human Resources	Karina Joyce Campos Blanco	BA in Psychology – Cayetano Heredia University

=== 2018–2019 ===
Office	Holder	Education
Chairman	Andrés Alejandro Quesada Nicoli	BS in Business Administration – University of the Pacific
Deputy Chairwoman	Andrea Valdivieso Lamarca	Law – University of the Pacific
Director of Finance	Rodrigo Rivadeneira Bejarano	BS in Business Engineering – University of the Pacific
Director of Human Resources	Augusto Dannon Alva	LLB – Pontifical Catholic University of Peru

=== 2019–2020 ===
Office	Holder	Education
Chairman	Juan Luis Salinas Dávila	BS in Business Administration – University of the Pacific
Deputy Chairman	Nicolás Enrique Delgado Pease	BS in Biology – Cayetano Heredia University
Director of Finance	Antonella Adelaida Calle Pérez	BA in Economics – University of the Pacific
Director of Human Resources	Martín Gallardo Garrath; Resigned Nov. 2019.	LLB – University of the Pacific; MA in International Relations and Diplomacy – Diplomatic Academy of Peru; MA in Human Rights – Pontifical Catholic University of Peru; MA in Security Studies – Georgetown University

=== 2020–2021 ===
Office	Holder	Education
Chairman	Rodrigo Fernando Seminario Cueva	LLB – Pontifical Catholic University of Peru
Deputy Chairman	Alvaro Peña Villanueva; Resigned May 2021. Nicolás Delgado Pease; Since Aug. 2021.	BS in Biology – Cayetano Heredia University
Director of Finance	Antonella Adelaida Calle Pérez	BA in Economics – University of the Pacific
Director of Human Resources	Karina Joyce Campos Blanco	BA in Psychology – Cayetano Heredia University

=== 2021–2022 ===
Office	Holder	Education
Chairman	Rodrigo Fernando Seminario Cueva	LLB – Pontifical Catholic University of Peru
Deputy Chairman	Nicolás Enrique Delgado Pease	BS in Biology – Cayetano Heredia University
Director of Finance	Antonella Adelaida Calle Pérez	BA in Economics – University of the Pacific
Director of Human Resources	Karina Joyce Campos Blanco	BA in Psychology – Cayetano Heredia University

=== 2022–2023 ===
Office	Incumbent	Education
Chairman	Alvaro Peña Villanueva	LLB candidate – Pontifical Catholic University of Peru
Deputy Chairman	Luis Aníbal Olazábal Tamayo	LLB candidate – University of Lima
Director of Finance	Inés Bullard Elías	BFA in Scenic and Production Design – Pontifical Catholic University of Peru
Director of Human Resources	Alejandro Céspedes García	BA in Political Science and Government – Pontifical Catholic University of Peru

=== 2023–2024 ===
Office	Incumbent	Education
Chairman	Alejandro Céspedes García	BA in Political Science and Government – Pontifical Catholic University of Peru
Deputy Chairman	Joaquín Alejandro Mejía Cacho	LLB – Pontifical Catholic University of Peru
Director of Finance	Inés Bullard Elías	BFA in Scenic and Production Design – Pontifical Catholic University of Peru
Director of Human Resources	Miguel Prado de Orbegoso	BA in Psychology – Pontifical Catholic University of Peru

=== 2024–2025 ===
Office	Incumbent	Education
Chairman	Joaquín Alejandro Mejía Cacho	LLB – Pontifical Catholic University of Peru
Deputy Chairman	Víctor Andrés Marroquín-Merino Torres	AOS in Acting – American Academy of Dramatic Arts; BFA in Theatre, Politics, and History – New York University; MSc in Latin American Studies – University of Oxford
Director of Finance	Javier Augusto Balbuena Herrera	BS in Industrial Engineering – University of Lima
Director of Human Resources	Fabio José Macedo Naters	BS in Business Administration – University of the Pacific

=== 2025–2026 ===
Office	Incumbent	Education
Chairman	Sebastián Morello Montes	LLB – Pontifical Catholic University of Peru
Deputy Chairwoman	Paula María Valle Martínez; Resigned May 2026. Vacant; Since May 2026.	LLB candidate – University of the Pacific
Director of Finance	Jerhko José Marangunich Guerrero	BA in Economics – University of the Pacific
Director of Public Relations	Víctor Andrés Marroquín-Merino Torres	AOS in Acting – American Academy of Dramatic Arts; BFA in Theatre, Politics, and History – New York University; MSc in Latin American Studies – University of Oxford

== Faculty Advisors ==
Chief Advisors in bold

=== 2014–2015 season ===
Office	Faculty Advisor	Education	Conferences	Individual Awards
**Chief Advisor**	**Gustavo Taboada**	LLB, University of Lima	Harvard National Model United Nations – Latin America 2015; Harvard National Model United Nations 2015	Honorable Mention (HNMUN 2010) (Note: Awarded as part of the University of Lima delegation for HNMUN 2010 at Boston.)
Faculty Advisor	Franco Nicolini	LLB, University of Lima	Harvard National Model United Nations – Latin America 2015; Harvard National Model United Nations 2015	–
Faculty Advisor	María del Pilar Lindley	BS candidate in Industrial Engineering, University of Lima	Harvard National Model United Nations - Latin America 2015; Harvard National Model United Nations 2015	Diplomacy Award (WorldMUN 2013) (Note: Awarded as part of the Peruvian Universities delegation for WorldMUN 2013 at Melbourne.)
Faculty Advisor	Carlos Santibañez	BA in Political Science & Government, Pontifical Catholic University of Peru	Harvard National Model United Nations - Latin America 2015; Harvard National Model United Nations 2015	–
Faculty Advisor	Martín Gallardo	LLB candidate, University of the Pacific	Harvard National Model United Nations 2015	Honorable Mention (HNMUN 2014) (Note: Awarded as part of the Peruvian Universities delegation for HNMUN 2014 at Boston.)

=== 2015–2016 season ===
Office	Faculty Advisor	Education	Conferences	Individual Awards
**Chief Advisor**	**Franco Nicolini**	LLB, University of Lima	Harvard National Model United Nations - Latin America 2016; Harvard National Model United Nations 2016	–
Faculty Advisor	Martín Gallardo	LLB candidate, University of the Pacific	Harvard National Model United Nations - Latin America 2016	Honorable Mention (HNMUN 2014); Outstanding Delegate (HNMUN-LA 2015); Honorable Mention (HNMUN 2015)
Faculty Advisor	Jorge Alfonso Ramírez	BBA candidate, University of the Pacific	Harvard National Model United Nations - Latin America 2016	Best Delegate (HNMUN-LA 2015)
Faculty Advisor	Fabiola Ventura	BA candidate in Economics, University of the Pacific	Harvard National Model United Nations - Latin America 2016	Outstanding Delegate (HNMUN-LA 2015); Honorable Mention (HNMUN 2015)
Faculty Advisor	Alfredo Villavicencio	BA candidate in Economics, Pontifical Catholic University of Peru	Harvard National Model United Nations 2016	Diplomacy Award (WorldMUN 2014) (Note: Awarded as part of the International Delegation of Peru delegation for WorldMUN 2014 at Brussels.)
**Chief Advisor**	**Gustavo Taboada**	LLB, University of Lima	Harvard World Model United Nations 2016	Honorable Mention (HNMUN 2010)
Faculty Advisor	María del Pilar Lindley	BS candidate in Industrial Engineering, University of Lima	Harvard World Model United Nations 2016	Diplomacy Award (WorldMUN 2013); Honorable Mention (HNMUN 2015)
Faculty Advisor	Youssef Abi-fadel	BA candidate in Economics, University of the Pacific	Harvard World Model United Nations 2016	Outstanding Delegate (HNMUN-LA 2015); Best Delegate (HNMUN-LA 2016)

=== 2016–2017 season ===
Office	Faculty Advisor	Education	Conferences	Individual Awards
**Chief Advisor**	**Franco Nicolini**	LLB, University of Lima	Harvard National Model United Nations - Latin America 2017; Harvard National Model United Nations 2017	–
Faculty Advisor	Andrés Quesada	BBA, University of the Pacific	Harvard National Model United Nations - Latin America 2017; Harvard National Model United Nations 2017	Outstanding Delegate (HNMUN-LA 2015)
Faculty Advisor	Daniel Huapaya	LLB, University of the Pacific	Harvard National Model United Nations - Latin America 2017; Harvard National Model United Nations 2017	–
Faculty Advisor	Daniel Lira	BA in Economics, University of the Pacific	Harvard National Model United Nations 2017	Best Delegate (HNMUN-LA 2015); Honorable Mention (HNMUN 2015); Outstanding Delegate (HNMUN-LA 2016)
Faculty Advisor	Verónica Díaz	BA in Economics, University of the Pacific	Harvard National Model United Nations 2017	Honorable Mention (HNMUN-LA 2015); Honorable Mention (HNMUN 2015)
**Chief Advisor**	**Gustavo Taboada**	LLB, University of Lima	Harvard World Model United Nations 2017	Honorable Mention (HNMUN 2010)
Faculty Advisor	Jorge Alfonso Ramírez	BBA, University of the Pacific	Harvard World Model United Nations 2017	Best Delegate (HNMUN-LA 2015); Outstanding Delegate (HNMUN-LA 2016); Diplomacy Award (WorldMUN 2016)
Faculty Advisor	María del Pilar Lindley	BS in Industrial Engineering, University of Lima	Harvard World Model United Nations 2017	Diplomacy Award (WorldMUN 2013); Honorable Mention (HNMUN 2015); Diplomacy Award (WorldMUN 2016)
Faculty Advisor	Alfredo Villavicencio	BA in Economics, Pontifical Catholic University of Peru	Harvard World Model United Nations 2017	Diplomacy Award (WorldMUN 2014)

=== 2017–2018 season ===
Office	Faculty Advisor	Education	Conferences	Individual Awards
Faculty Advisor	Augusto Dannon	LLB candidate, Pontifical Catholic University of Peru	Harvard National Model United Nations - Latin America 2018	Outstanding Delegate (HNMUN-LA 2016); Best Delegate (HNMUN-LA 2017); Honorable Mention (HNMUN 2017)
Faculty Advisor	Nicolás Delgado	BS candidate in Biology, Cayetano Heredia University	Harvard National Model United Nations - Latin America 2018	Best Delegate (HNMUN-LA 2016); Outstanding Delegate (HNMUN-LA 2017)
Faculty Advisor	Francesca Sabroso	BA candidate in Psychology, Pontifical Catholic University of Peru	Harvard National Model United Nations - Latin America 2018	Verbal Commendation (WorldMUN 2016); Best Delegate (HNMUN-LA 2017)
Faculty Advisor	José Alfredo Andrés	BS candidate in Industrial Engineering, University of Lima	Harvard National Model United Nations - Latin America 2018	Honorable Mention (HNMUN 2017)
Faculty Advisor	Juan Luis Salinas	BBA, University of the Pacific	Harvard National Model United Nations - Latin America 2018; Harvard National Model United Nations 2018	Best Delegate (HNMUN-LA 2015); Verbal Commendation (HNMUN 2016)
**Chief Advisor**	**Martín Gallardo**	LLB, University of the Pacific; MA candidate in Diplomacy and International Relations, Diplomatic Academy of Peru	Harvard National Model United Nations 2018	Honorable Mention (HNMUN 2014); Outstanding Delegate (HNMUN-LA 2015); Honorable Mention (HNMUN 2015); Best Delegate (HNMUN-LA 2016)
Faculty Advisor	Fabiola Ventura	BA in Economics, University of the Pacific	Harvard National Model United Nations 2018	Outstanding Delegate (HNMUN-LA 2015); Honorable Mention (HNMUN 2015); Best Delegate (HNMUN-LA 2016); Outstanding Delegate (HNMUN 2016)
**Chief Advisor**	**Jorge Alfonso Ramírez**	BBA, University of the Pacific	Harvard World Model United Nations 2018	Best Delegate (HNMUN-LA 2015); Outstanding Delegate (HNMUN-LA 2016); Diplomacy Award (WorldMUN 2016)
Faculty Advisor	Youssef Abi-fadel	BA in Economics, University of the Pacific	Harvard World Model United Nations 2018	Outstanding Delegate (HNMUN-LA 2015); Best Delegate (HNMUN-LA 2016); Diplomacy Award (WorldMUN 2016)
Faculty Advisor	Andrea Valdivieso	LLB candidate, University of the Pacific	Harvard World Model United Nations 2018	Honorable Mention (HNMUN-LA 2015); Diplomacy Award (WorldMUN 2016)
Faculty Advisor	Andrés Quesada	BBA, University of the Pacific	Harvard World Model United Nations 2018	Outstanding Delegate (HNMUN-LA 2015)

=== 2018–2019 season ===
Office	Faculty Advisor	Education	Conferences	Individual Awards
Faculty Advisor	Angel Gómez	LLB candidate, University of Lima	Harvard National Model United Nations - Latin America 2019	Diplomatic Commendation (HNMUN 2018)
Faculty Advisor	Isabella Ponce de León	BS candidate in Industrial Engineering, University of Lima	Harvard National Model United Nations - Latin America 2019	Diplomacy Award (WorldMUN 2017); Outstanding Delegate (HNMUN-LA 2018); Diplomacy Award (WorldMUN 2018)
Faculty Advisor	Francesca Tiravanti	LLB candidate, University of Lima	Harvard National Model United Nations - Latin America 2019	Diplomacy Award (WorldMUN 2018)
Faculty Advisor	Daniela Mejía	BArch candidate, University of Lima	Harvard National Model United Nations - Latin America 2019	Honorable Mention (HNMUN-LA 2017)
**Chief Advisor**	**Juan Luis Salinas**	BBA, University of the Pacific	Harvard National Model United Nations 2019	Best Delegate (HNMUN-LA 2015); Verbal Commendation (HNMUN 2016)
Faculty Advisor	Juan Diego García	BBA candidate, University of the Pacific	Harvard National Model United Nations 2019	Diplomacy Award (WorldMUN 2017)
Faculty Advisor	Antonella Calle	BA in Economics, University of the Pacific	Harvard National Model United Nations 2019	Diplomatic Commendation (HNMUN 2018)
Faculty Advisor	Valeria Escudero (replacing Nicolás Delgado)	BA candidate in Marketing, University of Lima	Harvard National Model United Nations 2019	Verbal Commendation (HNMUN-LA 2018); Honorable Mention (HNMUN 2018)
**Chief Advisor**	**José Alfredo Andrés**	BS candidate in Industrial Engineering, University of Lima	Harvard World Model United Nations 2019	Honorable Mention (HNMUN 2017); Verbal Commendation (WorldMUN 2018)
Faculty Advisor	Fabiana Chávez	LLB candidate, Pontifical Catholic University of Peru	Harvard World Model United Nations 2019	Outstanding Delegate (HNMUN-LA 2016); Verbal Commendation (HNMUN 2016); Verbal Commendation (WorldMUN 2017); Diplomacy Award (WorldMUN 2018)
Faculty Advisor	Maria Grazia Vallejos	LLB candidate, University of the Pacific	Harvard World Model United Nations 2019	Diplomacy Award (WorldMUN 2017); Outstanding Delegate (HNMUN 2018)
Faculty Advisor	Gonzalo Tripoli	BBA candidate, University of the Pacific	Harvard World Model United Nations 2019	Verbal Commendation (WorldMUN 2017); Best Delegate (HNMUN-LA 2018); Diplomacy Award (WorldMUN 2018)

=== 2019–2020 season ===
Office	Faculty Advisor	Education	Conferences	Individual Awards
**Chief Advisor**	**Andrea Valdivieso**	LLB candidate, University of the Pacific	Harvard National Model United Nations - Latin America 2020	Honorable Mention (HNMUN-LA 2015); Diplomacy Award (WorldMUN 2016)
Faculty Advisor	Sebastián Morello	LLB candidate, Pontifical Catholic University of Peru	Harvard National Model United Nations - Latin America 2020	Honorable Mention (HNMUN-LA 2017); Verbal Commendation (HNMUN-LA 2018); Honorable Mention (HNMUN 2018); Outstanding Delegate (HNMUN-LA 2019)
Faculty Advisor	Inés Bullard	BFA candidate in Scenic Creation and Production, Pontifical Catholic University of Peru	Harvard National Model United Nations - Latin America 2020	Best Delegate (HNMUN-LA 2018); Outstanding Delegate (HNMUN 2019)
Faculty Advisor	Alvaro Peña	LLB candidate, Pontifical Catholic University of Peru	Harvard National Model United Nations - Latin America 2020	Honorable Mention (HNMUN 2018); Outstanding Delegate (HNMUN-LA 2019); Diplomacy Award (WorldMUN 2019)
Faculty Advisor	José Mariano Martínez	LLB candidate, Pontifical Catholic University of Peru	Harvard National Model United Nations - Latin America 2020	Outstanding Delegate (HNMUN-LA 2019); Diplomacy Award (WorldMUN 2019)
**Chief Advisor**	**Karina Campos**	BA candidate in Psychology, Cayetano Heredia University	Harvard National Model United Nations 2020	Honorable Mention (HNMUN 2017)
Faculty Advisor	Yassmín Muñoz-Nájar	LLB candidate, University of Lima	Harvard National Model United Nations 2020	Best Delegate (HNMUN 2017); Diplomacy Award (WorldMUN 2018); Outstanding Delegate (HNMUN-LA 2019)
Faculty Advisor	Isabella Ponce de León (replacing Rodrigo Guzmán)	BS candidate in Industrial Engineering, University of Lima	Harvard National Model United Nations 2020	Diplomacy Award (WorldMUN 2017); Outstanding Delegate (HNMUN-LA 2018); Diplomacy Award (WorldMUN 2018); Honorable Mention (HNMUN 2019)
Faculty Advisor	Rodrigo Gamero	BBA, University of the Pacific	Harvard National Model United Nations 2020	Diplomacy Award (WorldMUN 2018); Diplomacy Award (WorldMUN 2019)
**Chief Advisor**	**Fabiana Chávez**	LLB candidate, Pontifical Catholic University of Peru	Harvard World Model United Nations 2020 (**Cancelled Conference**)	Outstanding Delegate (HNMUN-LA 2016); Verbal Commendation (HNMUN 2016); Verbal Commendation (WorldMUN 2017); Diplomacy Award (WorldMUN 2018)
Faculty Advisor	Francesca Tiravanti	LLB candidate, University of Lima	Harvard World Model United Nations 2020 (**Cancelled Conference**)	Diplomacy Award (WorldMUN 2018)
Faculty Advisor	Fabio Macedo	BBA candidate, University of the Pacific	Harvard World Model United Nations 2020 (**Cancelled Conference**)	Outstanding Delegate (HNMUN-LA 2017); Diplomacy Award (WorldMUN 2018)
Faculty Advisor	Paolo Ghio	BBA candidate, University of the Pacific	Harvard World Model United Nations 2020 (**Cancelled Conference**)	Diplomacy Award (WorldMUN 2018); Diplomacy Award (WorldMUN 2019)

=== 2020–2021 season ===
Office	Faculty Advisor	Education	Conferences	Individual Awards
**Chief Advisor**	**Inés Bullard**	BFA in Scenic Creation and Production, Pontifical Catholic University of Peru	Harvard National Model United Nations - Latin America 2021	Best Delegate (HNMUN-LA 2018); Outstanding Delegate (HNMUN 2019)
Faculty Advisor	Luis Olazábal	LLB candidate, University of Lima	Harvard National Model United Nations - Latin America 2021	Honorable Mention (WorldMUN 2017) (Note: Awarded as part of the International Delegation of Peru delegation for WorldMUN 2017 at Montreal.); Honorable Mention (HNMUN 2018)
Faculty Advisor	Sandra Lizarzaburu	BA in Marketing, University of the Pacific	Harvard National Model United Nations - Latin America 2021	Outstanding Delegate (HNMUN-LA 2018); Verbal Commendation (WorldMUN 2018)
Faculty Advisor	Alejandro Céspedes	BA in Political Science & Government, Pontifical Catholic University of Peru	Harvard National Model United Nations - Latin America 2021	Diplomatic Commendation (HNMUN 2019)
**Chief Advisor**	**Valeria Escudero**	BA candidate in Marketing, University of Lima	Harvard National Model United Nations 2021	Verbal Commendation (HNMUN-LA 2018); Honorable Mention (HNMUN 2018)
Faculty Advisor	Joaquín Mejía	LLB candidate, Pontifical Catholic University of Peru	Harvard National Model United Nations 2021	Honorable Mention (HNMUN-LA 2017) (Note: Awarded as part of the International Delegation of Peru delegation for HNMUN-LA 2017 at Lima.); Best Delegate (HNMUN-LA 2018); Diplomatic Commendation (HNMUN 2018); Honorable Mention (HNMUN 2019)
Faculty Advisor	Valerie Woodman	BA candidate in Marketing, University of Lima	Harvard National Model United Nations 2021	Best Delegate (HNMUN-LA 2018); Diplomacy Award (WorldMUN 2018); Diplomacy Award (WorldMUN 2019)
Faculty Advisor	Camila Mendoza	LLB candidate, University of Lima	Harvard National Model United Nations 2021	Diplomatic Commendation (HNMUN 2019)
**Chief Advisor**	**Fabiana Chávez**	LLB, Pontifical Catholic University of Peru	Harvard World Model United Nations 2021	Outstanding Delegate (HNMUN-LA 2016); Verbal Commendation (HNMUN 2016); Verbal Commendation (WorldMUN 2017); Diplomacy Award (WorldMUN 2018)
Faculty Advisor	Francesca Tiravanti	LLB candidate, University of Lima	Harvard World Model United Nations 2021	Diplomacy Award (WorldMUN 2018)
Faculty Advisor	Isabella Ponce de León (replacing Paolo Ghio)	BS in Industrial Engineering, University of Lima	Harvard World Model United Nations 2021	Diplomacy Award (WorldMUN 2017); Outstanding Delegate (HNMUN-LA 2018); Diplomacy Award (WorldMUN 2018); Honorable Mention (HNMUN 2019)
Faculty Advisor	Fabio Macedo	BBA, University of the Pacific	Harvard World Model United Nations 2021	Outstanding Delegate (HNMUN-LA 2017); Diplomacy Award (WorldMUN 2018)

=== 2021–2022 season ===
Office	Faculty Advisor	Education	Conferences	Individual Awards
**Chief Advisor**	**Joaquín Mejía**	LLB, Pontifical Catholic University of Peru	Harvard National Model United Nations 2022	Honorable Mention (HNMUN-LA 2017) (Note: Awarded as part of the International Delegation of Peru delegation for HNMUN-LA 2017 at Lima.); Best Delegate (HNMUN-LA 2018); Diplomatic Commendation (HNMUN 2018); Honorable Mention (HNMUN 2019)
Faculty Advisor	Valeria Escudero (replacing Almendra Advíncula)	BA in Marketing, University of Lima	Harvard National Model United Nations 2022	Verbal Commendation (HNMUN-LA 2018); Honorable Mention (HNMUN 2018)
Faculty Advisor	Sandra Lizarzaburu	BA in Marketing, University of the Pacific	Harvard National Model United Nations 2022	Outstanding Delegate (HNMUN-LA 2018); Verbal Commendation (WorldMUN 2018)
Faculty Advisor	Jerhko Marangunich	BA in Economics; University of the Pacific	Harvard National Model United Nations 2022	Honorable Mention (HNMUN-LA 2019); Verbal Commendation (WorldMUN 2019)
**Chief Advisor**	**Alvaro Peña** (succeeding Fabio Macedo)	LLB candidate, Pontifical Catholic University of Peru	Harvard World Model United Nations 2022	Honorable Mention (HNMUN 2018); Outstanding Delegate (HNMUN-LA 2019); Diplomacy Award (WorldMUN 2019)
Faculty Advisor	Felipe Núñez del Prado	LLB candidate, Pontifical Catholic University of Peru	Harvard World Model United Nations 2022; Harvard National Model United Nations - Latin America 2022	Best Delegate (HNMUN-LA 2019); Honorable Mention (HNMUN-LA 2021)
**Chief Advisor**	**José Mariano Martínez**	LLB candidate, Pontifical Catholic University of Peru	Harvard National Model United Nations - Latin America 2022	Outstanding Delegate (HNMUN-LA 2019); Diplomacy Award (WorldMUN 2019)
Faculty Advisor	Juan Sergio Puicon	LLB, Pontifical Catholic University of Peru	Harvard National Model United Nations - Latin America 2022	Diplomacy Award (WorldMUN 2018); Best Delegate (HNMUN-LA 2019); Diplomatic Commendation (HNMUN 2019)
Faculty Advisor	Nennele Rivadeneira	LLB candidate, University of Lima	Harvard National Model United Nations - Latin America 2022	–
Faculty Advisor	Vania Campana	LLB candidate, University of Lima	Harvard National Model United Nations - Latin America 2022	–

=== 2022–2023 season ===
Office	Faculty Advisor	Education	Conferences	Individual Awards
**Chief Advisor**	**Juan Diego Rodríguez**	LLB candidate, University of Lima	Harvard National Model United Nations 2023	Best Delegate (HNMUN-LA 2020); Best Delegate (HNMUN 2022); Outstanding Delegate (HNMUN-LA 2022)
Faculty Advisor	Isabella Ponce de León (replacing María Angélica Fernández)	BS in Industrial Engineering, University of Lima	Harvard National Model United Nations 2023	Diplomacy Award (WorldMUN 2017); Outstanding Delegate (HNMUN-LA 2018); Diplomacy Award (WorldMUN 2018); Honorable Mention (HNMUN 2019)
Faculty Advisor	Marcelo Hernández	LLB candidate, University of the Pacific	Harvard National Model United Nations 2023	Best Delegate (HNMUN 2020)
**Chief Advisor**	**Miguel Prado**	BA candidate in Psychology, Pontifical Catholic University of Peru	Harvard World Model United Nations 2023	Diplomacy Award (WorldMUN 2019); Diplomacy Award (WorldMUN 2021)
Faculty Advisor	Jean Paul Cerdán	BBA, University of the Pacific	Harvard World Model United Nations 2023	–
Faculty Advisor	Daniela Azmouz	BS candidate in International Business, University of the Pacific	Harvard World Model United Nations 2023	–
Faculty Advisor	Joyce Antón	BS in Industrial Engineering, University of Lima	Harvard World Model United Nations 2023	Diplomacy Award (WorldMUN 2021); Honorable Mention (HNMUN-LA 2022)

=== 2023–2024 season ===
Office	Faculty Advisor	Education	Conferences	Individual Awards
**Chief Advisor**	**Mario Genit**	LLB candidate, Pontifical Catholic University of Peru	Harvard National Model United Nations - Latin America 2024	Honorable Mention (HNMUN-LA 2021); Honorable Mention (HNMUN 2022); Outstanding Delegate (HNMUN 2023); Diplomacy Award (WorldMUN 2023)
Faculty Advisor	Andrea Palacios	LLB candidate, Pontifical Catholic University of Peru	Harvard National Model United Nations - Latin America 2024	Honorable Mention (HNMUN-LA 2021)
Faculty Advisor	Ignacio Tovar	LLB candidate, Pontifical Catholic University of Peru	Harvard National Model United Nations - Latin America 2024	Diplomacy Award (WorldMUN 2021); Honorable Mention (HNMUN-LA 2021)
Faculty Advisor	Sofía Wong	LLB candidate, University of Lima	Harvard National Model United Nations - Latin America 2024	Best Delegate (HNMUN-LA 2021)
**Chief Advisor**	**Sebastián Morello** (succeeding Marcelo Hernández)	LLB, Pontifical Catholic University of Peru	Harvard National Model United Nations 2024	Honorable Mention (HNMUN-LA 2017); Verbal Commendation (HNMUN-LA 2018); Honorable Mention (HNMUN 2018); Outstanding Delegate (HNMUN-LA 2019)
Faculty Advisor	Rodrigo Guzmán (replacing Manuel Calderón)	–	Harvard National Model United Nations 2024	Outstanding Delegate (HNMUN-LA 2018); Honorable Mention (HNMUN-LA 2019); Honorable Mention (HNMUN-LA 2020)
Faculty Advisor	Paula Valle	LLB candidate, University of the Pacific	Harvard National Model United Nations 2022	Outstanding Delegate (HNMUN 2022); Outstanding Delegate (HNMUN-LA 2022); Best Delegate (HNMUN 2023)
**Chief Advisor**	**Daniela Azmouz**	BS candidate in International Business, University of the Pacific	Harvard World Model United Nations 2024	–
Faculty Advisor	Jean Paul Cerdán	BBA, University of the Pacific	Harvard World Model United Nations 2024	–
Faculty Advisor	Juan Diego Rodríguez	LLB candidate, University of Lima	Harvard World Model United Nations 2024	Best Delegate (HNMUN-LA 2020); Best Delegate (HNMUN 2022); Outstanding Delegate (HNMUN-LA 2022)

=== 2024–2025 season ===
Office	Faculty Advisor	Education	Conferences	Individual Awards
**Chief Advisor**	**Sofía Wong**	LLB candidate, University of Lima	Harvard National Model United Nations - Latin America 2025	Best Delegate (HNMUN-LA 2021)
Faculty Advisor	Andrea Palacios	LLB candidate, Pontifical Catholic University of Peru	Harvard National Model United Nations - Latin America 2025	Honorable Mention (HNMUN-LA 2021)
Faculty Advisor	Camila Neyra	LLB candidate, University of Lima	Harvard National Model United Nations - Latin America 2025	–
**Chief Advisor**	**Rodrigo Guzmán**	–	Harvard National Model United Nations 2025	Outstanding Delegate (HNMUN-LA 2018); Honorable Mention (HNMUN-LA 2019); Honorable Mention (HNMUN-LA 2020)
Faculty Advisor	Sebastián Morello	LLB, Pontifical Catholic University of Peru	Harvard National Model United Nations 2025	Honorable Mention (HNMUN-LA 2017); Verbal Commendation (HNMUN-LA 2018); Honorable Mention (HNMUN 2018); Outstanding Delegate (HNMUN-LA 2019)
Faculty Advisor	Paula Valle	LLB candidate, University of the Pacific	Harvard National Model United Nations 2025	Outstanding Delegate (HNMUN 2022); Outstanding Delegate (HNMUN-LA 2022); Best Delegate (HNMUN 2023)
**Chief Advisor**	**Alvaro Peña**	LLB candidate, Pontifical Catholic University of Peru	Harvard World Model United Nations 2025	Honorable Mention (HNMUN 2018); Outstanding Delegate (HNMUN-LA 2019); Diplomacy Award (WorldMUN 2019)
Faculty Advisor	Bruno Bambarén	BA in International Relations candidate, Peruvian University of Applied Sciences	Harvard World Model United Nations 2025	Diplomacy Award (WorldMUN 2023); Best Delegate (HNMUN-LA 2024); Outstanding Delegate (HNMUN 2024)

=== 2025–2026 season ===
Office	Faculty Advisor	Education	Conferences	Individual Awards
**Chief Advisor**	**Camila Neyra**	LLB candidate, University of Lima	Harvard National Model United Nations - Latin America 2026	–
Faculty Advisor	Bruno Bambarén	BA in International Relations candidate, Peruvian University of Applied Sciences	Harvard National Model United Nations - Latin America 2026	Diplomacy Award (WorldMUN 2023); Best Delegate (HNMUN-LA 2024); Outstanding Delegate (HNMUN 2024)
Faculty Advisor	Benjamín Espinosa	LLB candidate, University of Lima	Harvard National Model United Nations - Latin America 2026	Outstanding Delegate (HNMUN-LA 2025); Best Delegate (HNMUN 2025)
**Chief Advisor**	**Andrea Palacios**	LLB candidate, Pontifical Catholic University of Peru	Harvard National Model United Nations 2026	Honorable Mention (HNMUN-LA 2021); Honorable Mention (HNMUN 2025)
Faculty Advisor	Sofía Wong	LLB candidate, University of Lima	Harvard National Model United Nations 2026	Best Delegate (HNMUN-LA 2021)
Faculty Advisor	Priscila Vásquez	LLB candidate, University of Lima	Harvard National Model United Nations 2026	Diplomatic Commendation (HNMUN 2023)

=== 2026–2027 season ===
Office	Faculty Advisor	Education	Conferences	Individual Awards
**Chief Advisor**	**Benjamín Espinosa**	LLB candidate, University of Lima	Harvard National Model United Nations - Latin America 2027	Outstanding Delegate (HNMUN-LA 2025); Best Delegate (HNMUN 2025)
Faculty Advisor	Santiago Galdo	LLB candidate, Pontifical Catholic University of Peru	Harvard National Model United Nations - Latin America 2027	–
Faculty Advisor	Valentina Ursino	BSc in International Economics and Management candidate, Bocconi University	Harvard National Model United Nations - Latin America 2027	Best Delegate (HNMUN-LA 2025)Diplomatic Commendation (HNMUN 2025)
**Chief Advisor**	**Paula Valle**	LLB candidate, University of the Pacific	Harvard National Model United Nations 2027	Outstanding Delegate (HNMUN 2022); Outstanding Delegate (HNMUN-LA 2022); Best Delegate (HNMUN 2023)
Faculty Advisor	Camila Neyra	LLB candidate, University of Lima	Harvard National Model United Nations 2027	–
Faculty Advisor	Vasco Soldevilla	LLB candidate, University of Lima	Harvard National Model United Nations 2027	Best Delegate (HNMUN-LA 2022)
**Chief Advisor**	**Kiyomi Murakuki**	LLB candidate, University of Lima	Harvard World Model United Nations 2027	Outstanding Delegate (HNMUN-LA 2020)
Faculty Advisor	Fabrizio Córdova	LLB candidate, Pontifical Catholic University of Peru	Harvard World Model United Nations 2027	Diplomacy Award (WorldMUN 2025)
Faculty Advisor	Yube Ostos	LLB candidate, University of Lima	Harvard World Model United Nations 2027	Verbal Commendation (WorldMUN 2024); Diplomacy Award (WorldMUN 2026)
Faculty Advisor	Franco Raffo	LLB candidate, Pontifical Catholic University of Peru	Harvard World Model United Nations 2027	–

== Harvard National Model United Nations Participation ==
Generation	Session	Year	Secretary General	Representing	Faculty Advisors	Head Delegates	Individual Awards
I	61	2015	Jeffrey Schroeder	Republic of the Congo	Gustavo Taboada; Franco Nicolini; Carlos Santibáñez; Martín Gallardo; María del Pilar Lindley	Jorge Alfonso Ramírez; Martín Gallardo; María del Pilar Lindley	3 Honorable Mentions; Daniel Lira / Verónica Díaz (WHO); Fabiola Ventura (HGA); Martín Gallardo / María del Pilar Lindley (HRC)
II	62	2016	Aman Rizvi	Kingdom of Saudi Arabia; Barbados; Republic of Guinea El País	Franco Nicolini; Alfredo Villavicencio	Fabiola Ventura; Juan Luis Salinas	2 Outstanding Delegates; Juan Carlos Revoredo / María Ximena Yarleque (HGA); Fabiola Ventura (AU); 2 Honorable Mentions; Carmela García / Daniela Rizo-Patrón (Legal); Matías Voto-Bernales / Daniela Benzáquen (HRC); 2 Verbal Commendations; Fabiana Chávez (Press Corps); Juan Luis Salinas (Crisis)
III	63	2017	Bennett E. Vogt	United States of America; Republic of Djibouti; The Straits Times	Franco Nicolini; Daniel Lira; Andrés Quesada; Verónica Díaz; Daniel Huapaya	María del Pilar Lindley; Andrea Valdivieso; Eduardo Dibós; Jose Alfredo Andrés; Karina Campos	1 Best Delegate; Yassmín Muñoz-Nájar (HGA); 1 Outstanding Delegate; Rebecca Windsor (Crisis); 3 Honorable Mentions; Andrea Guardia / Alejandra Guardia (SOCHUM); Augusto Dannon (CSW); José Alfredo Andrés / Karina Campos (OAS); 1 Verbal Commendation; André Díaz (Crisis)
IV	64	2018	Sarah S. Anderson	Republic of India; United Arab Emirates; Lao People's Democratic Republic; The New York Times; Médecins Sans Frontières	Martín Gallardo; Fabiola Ventura; Juan Luis Salinas	Angel Gómez; Rodrigo Guzmán	3 Outstanding Delegates; Andrea Morante (Press Corps); María Grazia Vallejos (CSW); Francesca Sabroso (NGO Programme); 3 Honorable Mentions; Daniela Sibina / Jimena Ayala (WHO); Luis Olazábal / Sebastián Morello (HGA); Valeria Escudero / Alvaro Peña (LAS); 3 Diplomatic Commendations; Joaquín Mejía / Antonella Calle (UNDP); Angel Gómez (IAEA); André Díaz (Crisis)
V	65	2019	Antonio J. Soriano	Kingdom of Spain; The New York Times; Pharmaciens Sans Frontières	Juan Luis Salinas; Juan Diego García; Antonella Calle; Valeria Escudero	Rodrigo Guzmán; André Díaz	1 Best Delegate; María Angélica Fernández (Crisis); 1 Outstanding Delegate; Inés Bullard (NGO Programme); 1 Honorable Mention; Isabella Ponce de León / Joaquín Mejía (CSW); 3 Diplomatic Commendations; Nicole Lindley / Almendra Advíncula (ECOFIN); Alejandro Céspedes (Press Corps); Juan Sergio Puicon / Camila Mendoza (UNEP)
VI	66	2020	Noah D. Cominsky	Kingdom of Spain; The Economist; Women for Women International	Karina Campos; Isabella Ponce de León; Yassmín Muñoz-Nájar; Rodrigo Gamero	Almendra Advíncula; Emilio Echeandía	1 Best Delegate; Marcelo Hernández (UNHCR); 1 Honorable Mention; Almendra Advíncula (NGO Programme)
VII	67	2021	Katherine M. Lempres	Kingdom of Saudi Arabia; Republic of the Sudan; Republic of Bulgaria; The Times of London	Valeria Escudero; Joaquín Mejía; Valerie Woodman; Camila Mendoza	Felipe Núñez del Prado	1 Best Delegate; Alessia Lara (Legal); 2 Diplomatic Commendations; Alejandro Robles (CSW); Josemaría Soriano (NATO)
VIII	68	2022	Andrew Young Jun Kim	Islamic Republic of Iran; Republic of Korea; Republic of Nigeria; Republic of Slovakia; Amnesty International	Joaquín Mejía; Valeria Escudero; Sandra Lizarzaburu; Jerhko Marangunich	Andrea Palacios; Mario Genit	1 Best Delegate; Juan Diego Rodriguez (NGO Programme); 1 Outstanding Delegate; Paula Valle (FGA); 2 Honorable Mentions; Mario Genit (CSW); Valerie Delgado (NATO)
IX	69	2023	Fatoumata B. Ouedrago	Republic of Finland; Solomon Islands; Trinidad and Tobago; Association for Women's Rights in Development (AWID)	Juan Diego Rodríguez; Isabella Ponce de León; Marcelo Hernández	Mario Genit; Paula Valle	1 Best Delegate; Paula Valle (NGO Programme); 1 Outstanding Delegate; Mario Genit / Manuel Calderón (HRC); 2 Diplomatic Commendations; Priscila Vásquez (ECOFIN); Mauricio Ferradas (FGA)
X	70	2024	Corine Chung	Kingdom of Belgium; Amnesty International	Sebastián Morello; Rodrigo Guzmán; Paula Valle	João De Cossio; Bruno Bambarén; Camila Neyra	1 Best Delegate; Luis Antonio Bisbal (NGO Programme); 2 Outstanding Delegate; María Fe Blanco / Camila Barrón (ECOFIN); Bruno Bambarén (EU); 1 Diplomatic Commendation; João De Cossio / Vanessa Herrada (UNIFEM)
XI	71	2025	Vivian Yee	Italian Republic; Jamaica	Rodrigo Guzmán; Sebastián Morello; Paula Valle	Camila Barrón; Vanessa Herrada	1 Best Delegate; Natalie Fistrovic / Benjamín Espinosa (WIPO); 1 Honorable Mention; Mario Genit / Andrea Palacios (DISEC); 3 Diplomatic Commendations; Valentina Ursino (ECOFIN); Michelangelo Muñóz (UNOOSA); Diego Lanza (ILO)
XII	72	2026	Omar E. Darwish	Republic of Turkey; Daily Maverick	Andrea Palacios; Sofía Wong; Priscila Vásquez	Luis Antonio Bisbal; Benjamín Espinosa	1 Best Delegate; Diego Lanza (Crisis); 1 Honorable Mention; Santiago Blanes (Legal); 1 Diplomatic Commendation; Nikolas Myerston (Press Corps)

== Harvard World Model United Nations Participation ==
Generation	Session	Year	Location	Secretary General	Representing	Faculty Advisors	Head Delegates	Individual Awards	Delegation Awards
II	25	2016	Rome, Italy	Joseph P. Hall	Commonwealth of Australia	Gustavo Taboada; María del Pilar Lindley; Youssef Abi-fadel	Jorge Alfonso Ramírez	3 Diplomacy Awards; María del Pilar Lindley / Youssef Abi-fadel (SPECPOL); Andrea Valdivieso / Thais Ortiz (WHO); Jorge Alfonso Ramírez / Martha Ocampo (WCW); 1 Verbal Commendation; Eduardo Dibós / Francesca Sabroso (SOCHUM)	Best Delegation Choreography
III	26	2017	Montreal, Canada	Parijat Lal	Federative Republic of Brazil; CNN	Gustavo Taboada; Jorge Alfonso Ramírez; Alfredo Villavicencio; María del Pilar Lindley	Francesca Sabroso	5 Diplomacy Awards; Nicole Acosta / Fernanda Falcone (WHO); María Grazia Vallejos / Valeria Valdivia (ECOFIN); Juan Diego García / Isabella Ponce de León (UNHCR); Cristián Carrión (Crisis); Alexandra López (TPA); 1 Verbal Commendation; Fabiana Chávez / Gonzalo Tripoli (CELAC)	Best Delegation Dance
IV	27	2018	Panama City, Panama	Nicholas Abbott	Canada	Jorge Alfonso Ramírez; Youssef Abi-fadel; Andrés Quesada; Andrea Valdivieso	Fabio Macedo; Jose Alfredo Andrés	8 Diplomacy Awards; Rodrigo Gamero / Lucía Haito (DISEC); Augusto Dannon / Valerie Woodman (SOCHUM); Francesca Tiravanti / Romina Bertolotto (WHO); Isabella Ponce de León / Alejandro Prado (WCW); Fabio Macedo / Paolo Ghio (UNESCO); Fabiana Chávez (UNHCR); Juan Sergio Puicon (CND); Yassmín Muñoz-Nájar / Gonzalo Tripoli (OAS); 2 Verbal Commendations; José Alfredo Andrés / Sandra Lizarzaburu (SPECPOL); Francesca Sabroso (UNICEF)	Best Large Delegation
V	28	2019	Madrid, Spain	Spencer Ma	Islamic Republic of Iran	José Alfredo Andrés; Fabiana Chávez; María Grazia Vallejos; Gonzalo Tripoli	Francesca Tiravanti; Valerie Woodman	5 Diplomacy Awards; Paolo Ghio (ECOFIN); Valerie Woodman / Gianluca Cattín (SOCHUM); Alvaro Peña / José Mariano Martínez (SPECPOL); Rodrigo Gamero (WHO); Daniela Mejía / Miguel Prado (CCPCJ); 1 Verbal Commendation; Jerhko Marangunich / Mauricio Barrios (CSTD)	Outstanding Large Delegation
VI	29	2020	Tokyo, Japan	Anirudh Suresh	Commonwealth of Australia; The Economist	Fabiana Chávez; Francesca Tiravanti; Fabio Macedo; Paolo Ghio	Alvaro Peña; Alejandro Céspedes	Participation Cancelled; Conference Postponed	Participation Cancelled; Conference Postponed
VII	29	2021	Virtual	Gabrielle Schultz	Commonwealth of Australia; Republic of Senegal	Fabiana Chávez; Francesca Tiravanti; Isabella Ponce de León; Fabio Macedo	Nennele Rivadeneira; Vania Campana	3 Diplomacy Awards; Nicolás Ormeño / Gonzalo Flores (DISEC); Joyce Antón (SOCHUM); Miguel Prado / Ignacio Tovar (HRC)	
VIII	30	2022	Virtual	Hope Kudo	Commonwealth of Australia; Kingdom of Sweden; People's Democratic Republic of Algeria; Federative Republic of Brazil; Argentine Republic	Alvaro Peña; Felipe Núñez del Prado	N/A	1 Diplomacy Award; Valerie Delgado (WHO); 3 Verbal Commendations; Valeria Contreras / Mauricio Ferradas (ECOFIN); Kiara Delgado / Daniela Chávez (SOCHUM); Daniella Ravelo (CSW)	Best Small Delegation
IX	31	2023	Paris, France	Olivia Fu	Republic of Chile; Canada; Kingdom of Belgium; Commonwealth of Australia; Republic of Colombia; Republic of Austria; Empire of Japan	Miguel Prado; Joyce Antón; Jean Paul Cerdán; Daniela Azmouz	Mario Genit; Javier Balbuena	2 Diplomacy Awards; Bruno Bambarén (WHO); Mario Genit (EU); 1 Verbal Commendation; Javier Balbuena / Alessandra Cáceres (ECOFIN)	
X	32	2024	Taipei, Taiwan	Davin Shi	United Kingdom of Great Britain and Northern Ireland	Daniela Azmouz; Jean Paul Cerdán; Juan Diego Rodríguez	Yube Ostos; Fabrizio Córdova	3 Verbal Commendations; Alejandro Pinto (DISEC); Yube Ostos (Legal); Diego Lanza (Crisis)	
XI	33	2025	Manila, Philippines	Kevin Li	United States of America; Portuguese Republic	Alvaro Peña; Bruno Bambarén	Micaela Fuertes; Luis Antonio Bisbal	1 Diplomacy Award; Fabrizio Córdova / Francesca Sansoni (CSocD); 3 Verbal Commendations; Micaela Fuertes (SPECPOL); Coryn Teodoro (SPECPOL); Diego Lanza (Legal)	

Since 2018, Peruvian Debate Society alumni have started to participate in Harvard World Model United Nations as part of the Substantial Affairs Team.

Session	Year	Location	Venue	Host Team	Assistant Directors
27	2018	Panama City, Panama	Atlapa Convention Centre	Universidad Católica Santa María La Antigua	World Conference on Women; Daniela Mejía; Organization of American States; María del Pilar Lindley
28	2019	Madrid, Spain	Palacio Municipal de Congresos	Spanish Alliance of Model United Nations	Social, Humanitarian and Cultural Committee; María del Pilar Lindley; Commission on Crime Prevention and Criminal Justice; Augusto Dannon
29	2021	Virtual	Zoom Video Communications	N/A	Social, Humanitarian and Cultural Committee; María del Pilar Lindley
30	2022	Virtual	Zoom Video Communications	N/A	World Health Organization; María del Pilar Lindley
31	2023	Paris, France	Multiple Venues	Paris Intercollegiate United Nations Committee	European Union; Bruno Villalobos; Paris Peace Conference, 1919; Víctor Andrés Marroquín-Merino

== Harvard National Model United Nations - Latin America Participation ==
Generation	Session	Year	Location	Secretary General	Representing	Faculty Advisors	Head Delegates	Individual Awards	Delegation Awards
I	4	2015	Lima, Peru	Madeline C. Connors	Russian Federation; Republic of Colombia; Kingdom of Norway; Republic of Peru; Republic of Korea; The Peruvian Times	Gustavo Taboada; Franco Nicolini; Maria del Pilar Lindley; Carlos Santibánez	Martín Gallardo	3 Best Delegates; Daniel Lira (DISEC); Jorge Alfonso Ramírez (UNICEF); Juan Luis Salinas (Crisis); 6 Outstanding Delegates; Andrés Quesada (DISEC); Fabiola Ventura (SOCHUM); Martín Gallardo (OAS); Vanessa Lam (UNICEF); Youssef Abi-fadel (UNSC); María Claudia Aguilar (TPA); 3 Honorable Mentions; Eduardo Dibós (DISEC); Verónica Díaz (SOCHUM); Andrea Valdivieso (UNICEF); 2 Rapporteurs; Jorge Alfonso Ramírez (UNICEF); Youssef Abi-fadel (UNSC)	Best Large Delegation
II	5	2016	Mexico City, Mexico	Taji Hutchins	Republic of Turkey; Plurinational State of Bolivia; Bolivarian Republic of Venezuela; Republic of El Salvador; Republic of Honduras; Republic of Chile; CNN; Greenpeace	Franco Nicolini; Martín Gallardo; Fabiola Ventura; Jorge Alfonso Ramírez	Martín Gallardo; Jorge Alfonso Ramírez	5 Best Delegates; Martín Gallardo (Legal); Fabiola Ventura (CSD); Youssef Abi-fadel (UNSC); Nicolás Delgado (Crisis); Ana Sofía Arón (TPA); 4 Outstanding Delegates; Augusto Dannon (SOCHUM); Fabiana Chávez (Legal); Jorge Alfonso Ramírez (UNESCO); Daniel Lira (Cumbre); 2 Honorable Mentions; Nicole Acosta (CSD); Shadia Kajatt (Cumbre); 2 Verbal Commendations; Gabriel Rey (SOCHUM); Grace Valdevitt (TPA); 3 Rapporteurs; Fabiola Ventura (CSD); Daniel Lira (Cumbre); Angel Gómez (UNSC)	Best Large Delegation
III	6	2017	Lima, Peru	Rohan Pidaparti	Russian Federation; State of Israel; Republic of Peru; Commonwealth of the Bahamas; Federal Republic of Nigeria; Republic of Paraguay; Médecins Sans Frontières	Franco Nicolini; Andrés Quesada; Daniel Huapaya	Fernanda Falcone; José Luis Valdera	3 Best Delegates; Enrique Rodríguez / Ricardo Temoche (DISEC); Augusto Dannon (HGA); Francesca Sabroso (TPA); 3 Outstanding Delegates; Fernanda Falcone (UNEP); Fabio Macedo (CELAC); Nicolás Delgado (UNSC); 6 Honorable Mentions; Romina Bertolotto / Camila Burmester (DISEC); Sebastián Morello (UNHCR); Daniela Mejía (HRC); Renzo Guillén (Cumbre); Rodrigo Rivadeneira (Cumbre); José Luis Valdera (Crisis); 3 Verbal Commendations; Alessia Edgar (HGA); Alessia Linares (UNHCR); Nicole Acosta (CELAC); 2 Rapporteurs; Augusto Dannon (HGA); José Luis Valdera (Crisis)	Outstanding Large Delegation
IV	7	2018	Lima, Peru	William R. Lobkowicz	Islamic Republic of Iran; French Republic; The Guardian; Human Rights Watch	Augusto Dannon; Nicolás Delgado; Juan Luis Salinas; Francesca Sabroso; José Alfredo Andrés	Rodrigo Guzmán; Francesca Tiravanti	5 Best Delegates; Inés Bullard (DISEC); Gonzalo Tripoli / Valerie Woodman (Cumbre); Andrew Mechem (UNESCO); Alejandro Prado (CSW); Joaquín Mejía (ICJ); 4 Outstanding Delegates; Rodrigo Guzmán (UNODC); Sandra Lizarzaburu (UNESCO); Isabella Ponce de León (CSW); André Díaz (Crisis); 1 Honorable Mention; Valeria Rivadeneira (TPA); 2 Verbal Commendations; Sebastián Morello (DISEC); Enrique Rodríguez / Valeria Escudero (Cumbre)	Best Large Delegation
V	8	2019	Lima, Peru	Daniel S. Menz	Russian Federation; Kingdom of Norway; Union of Soviet Socialist Republics; The Guardian	Angel Gómez; Isabella Ponce de León; Francesca Tiravanti; Daniela Mejía	Alvaro Peña; Juan Sergio Puicon	2 Best Delegates; Juan Sergio Puicon (CND); Felipe Núñez del Prado (UNESCO); 4 Outstanding Delegates; Sebastián Morello / José Mariano Martínez (Legal); Alessia Edgar / Alvaro Peña (Legal); Yassmín Muñoz-Nájar (CSW); Giulia Barbieri (TPA); 2 Honorable Mentions; Jerhko Marangunich (CND); André Díaz / Rodrigo Guzmán (UNSC); 1 Verbal Commendation; Álvaro Luy (Crisis)	Best Large Delegation
VI	9	2020	Puebla, Mexico	María Victoria Paredes	Russian Federation; French Republic; Union of Soviet Socialist Republics; Arab Republic of Egypt; Republic of Korea; La Nación	Sebastián Morello; Inés Bullard; Alvaro Peña; José Mariano Martínez	Gianluca Cattín; Miguel Kantor	1 Best Delegate; Juan Diego Rodríguez (Crisis); 1 Outstanding Delegate; Kiyomi Murakuki (CSW); 1 Honorable Mention; Rodrigo Guzmán (HGA); 2 Verbal Commendations; Gianluca Cattín / Miguel Kantor (SOCHUM); Emilio Sopprani (Crisis)	
VII	10	2021	Virtual	Sofía Corzo	Russian Federation United Mexican States; Federative Republic of Brazil; Republic of Colombia; Grenada	Inés Bullard; Luis Olazábal; Sandra Lizarzaburu; Alejandro Céspedes	Felipe Núñez del Prado; Alejandro Robles	1 Best Delegate; Sofía Wong (Crisis); 2 Outstanding Delegates; Bruno Villalobos (DISEC); Rafael Tang (OAS); 4 Honorable Mentions; Andrea Palacios (DISEC); Ignacio Tovar / Mario Genit (UNICEF); Alejandro Robles (OAS); Felipe Núñez del Prado / Nicolás Ormeño (UNSC)	Outstanding University Delegation
VIII	11	2022	Panama City, Panama	Mónica Hinojosa Díaz	Russian Federation; Republic of India; People's Republic of China; United States of America; Republic of Colombia; The New York Times	José Mariano Martínez; Juan Sergio Puicon; Felipe Núñez del Prado; Nennele Rivadeneira; Vania Campana	Daniela Azmouz; Vasco Soldevilla	1 Best Delegate; Vasco Soldevilla (UNSC); 5 Outstanding Delegates; Paula Valle (CCPCJ); Javier Balbuena (UNICEF); Francisco Daza (UNICEF); Mauricio Ferradas (Crisis); Juan Diego Rodríguez (Press Corps); 2 Honorable Mentions; Joyce Antón (UNICEF); Andrea Asmat (Crisis)	Outstanding Large Delegation
X	13	2024	Panama City, Panama	Caroline Bukowski	Russian Federation; State of Japan; United Mexican States; Republic of Korea	Mario Genit; Andrea Palacios; Ignacio Tovar; Sofía Wong	Bruno Bambarén	3 Best Delegates; Daniela Rubina (UNICEF); Bruno Bambarén (UNEP); Ricardo Jiménez (CND); 2 Honorable Mentions; Micaela Fuertes (UNICEF); Valentina Ursino (UNEP)	Best Large Delegation
XI	14	2025	Panama City, Panama	Daniel J. Ennis	People’s Republic of China; Republic of Colombia; Republic of Chile; Plurinational State of Bolivia	Sofía Wong; Andrea Palacios; Camila Neyra	Benjamín Espinosa; Valentina Ursino	3 Best Delegates; Valentina Ursino (SOCHUM); Luis José Beingolea (WTO); Salma Samhan (UNFPA); 1 Outstanding Delegate; Benjamín Espinosa (UNSC); 2 Diplomatic Commendations; Fabiana Delgadillo (SOCHUM); Mariana Aldave (WTO)	Best Large Delegation

Since 2017, Peruvian Debate Society alumni have started to participate in Harvard National Model United Nations Latin America as part of the Substantial Affairs Team.

Session	Year	Location	Venue	Host Team	Assistant Directors
6	2017	Lima, Peru	The Westin Lima Hotel & Convention Center	The Avengers (No Official Host Team)	Disarmament and International Security Committee; Youssef Abi-fadel; Historical General Assembly, 1992; Martín Gallardo; Jorge Alfonso Ramírez; Cumbre de América del Sur y África; Fabiola Ventura
7	2018	Lima, Peru	27 de Enero Lima Convention Center	Promotora Internacional de Debates - Perú; Host Team President: María del Pilar Lindley	Cumbre Global de Ciudad; Luis Olazábal; Fabio Macedo; United Nations Office on Drugs and Crime; Nicole Acosta
8	2019	Lima, Peru	Universidad San Ignacio de Loyola	Promotora Internacional de Debates - Perú; Host Team President: María del Pilar Lindley	Disarmament and International Security Committee; Camila Mendoza; Legal Committee; Joaquín Mejía; United Nations Educational, Scientific and Cultural Organization; Valerie Woodman; Commission on the Status of Women; Camila Burmester; Organization of American States; Antonella Calle; Enrique Rodríguez; United Nations Security Council, 1985; Inés Bullard; Cabinet of Raúl Alfonsín, 1983; Víctor Andrés Marroquín-Merino
10	2021	Virtual	Zoom Video Communications	Asociación Panameña de Debate; Host Team President: Alan Smith	United Nations Security Council; Juan Diego Rodríguez; Presidential Cabinet of Brazil, 2018; Víctor Andrés Marroquín-Merino
11	2022	Panama City, Panama	Atlapa Convention Centre	Asociación Panameña de Debate; Host Team President: Alan Smith	Cabinet of Gran Colombia, 1819; Víctor Andrés Marroquín-Merino
13	2024	Panama City, Panama	Latin American Parliament	Asociación Panameña de Debate; Host Team President: Alan Smith	Commission on Narcotic Drugs; Andrea Asmat

== Universidad del Rosario Model United Nations Participation ==
Session	Year	Representing	Faculty Advisors	Individual Awards	Delegation Awards
6	2015	Republic of South Africa	Martín Gallardo; Carlos Santibáñez	6 Best Delegates; Augusto Dannon (SOCHUM); Gabriela Delgado (WHO); Angel Gómez (UNSA); Gianluca Venegas; Gabriel Rey; Matías García; 2 Outstanding Delegates; María Angélica Meneses; Alonso Torres Llosa; 1 Honorable Mention; Rafaela Tord; 1 Verbal Commendation; Daniela Rizo-Patrón	Best Large Delegation
8	2017	Russian Federation; Union of Soviet Socialist Republics	Youssef Abi-fadel; Jorge Alfonso Ramírez; Augusto Dannon	2 Best Delegates; Rodrigo Guzmán / Inés Bullard (DISEC); Francesca Sabroso (UN Women); 4 Outstanding Delegates; Valeria Adrianzén (HGA); Daniela Sibina / Jimena Ayala (SOCHUM); Fabio Macedo (IAEA); André Díaz (UNSC); 1 Honorable Mention; Luis Olazábal (CIS)	Best Medium Delegation
9	2018	Arab Republic of Egypt; Republic of Turkey; El Comercio	Juan Luis Salinas; Fabiana Chávez	4 Best Delegates; José Mariano Martínez / Gianluca Cattín (DISEC); Paolo Ghio (UNEP); Giulia Barbieri (Press Corps); Alessia Edgar (WHO); 2 Outstanding Delegates; Alvaro Peña (Trusteeship Council); Miguel Prado (Washington Conference); 2 Honorable Mentions; Francesca Tiravanti / Daniela Mejía (SOCHUM); Mauricio Barrios (IsDB)	Best Medium Delegation
10	2019	Republic of Turkey; Republic of Colombia; French Republic; Ottoman Empire; Middle Eastern Affairs	Karina Campos; Fabio Macedo; Inés Bullard	3 Best Delegates; Miguel Kantor (UNCLOS); Daniela Azmouz (UNICRI); Alejandro Céspedes (UN Journal); 2 Outstanding Delegates; Mauricio Barrios (LoN); Valeria Gamio (APA)	Best Medium Delegation
11	2021	Kingdom of Spain; Republic of Korea	Juan Sergio Puicon; Almendra Advíncula; Vania Campana	-	

Since 2016, Peruvian Debate Society alumni have started to participate in MUNUR as part of the Substantial Affairs Team.

Session	Year	Venue	Chair
7	2016	Del Rosario University	Press Corps; Antonella Calle (Director)
8	2017	Del Rosario University	Disarmament and International Security Committee; Daniela Mejía (Director)
9	2018	Del Rosario University	Disarmament and International Security Committee; André Díaz (Director); Rodrigo Guzmán (Director); World Health Organization; Jimena Ayala (Director); European Council; Luis Olazábal (Director); Washington Conference, 1949; Inés Bullard (Director); Press Corps; Antonella Calle (Director); Raccelli Benitez (Director)
10	2019	Del Rosario University	United Nations Convention on the Law of the Sea; Sebastián Morello (Director); Alvaro Peña (Director); United Nations Interregional Crime and Justice Research Institute; Valerie Woodman (Director); UN Journal; Francesa Tiravanti (Director)
11	2021	Del Rosario University	Willy Wonka Co. Board of Directors; Jorge Lazo (Director); Víctor Andrés Marroquín-Merino (Crisis Director)

== Oxford International Model United Nations Participation ==
Since 2018, Peruvian Debate Society alumni have started to participate in OxIMUN as part of the Substantial Affairs Team.

Session	Year	Venue	Staff Member
16	2018	University of Oxford	Joint Crisis Committee: The First Crusade; Rebecca Windsor (Crisis Backroom Staff)

== National Model United Nations Circuit Participation ==
=== Pontificia Universidad Católica del Perú Model United Nations (PUCPMUN) ===
Session	Year	Secretary General	Faculty Advisors	Individual Awards	Delegation Awards
IV	2015	Alfredo Villavicencio	Youssef Abi-fadel; Jorge Alfonso Ramírez	5 Best Delegates; Jorge Alfonso Ramírez / Andrés Quesada (DISEC); Andrea Benavides (HGA); Gianluca Venegas (UNSC); Juan Luis Salinas (Crisis); Eduardo Dibós (Crisis); 1 Outstanding Delegate; Fabiola Ventura (IMF); 1 Honorable Mention; Andrea Valdivieso (COP 21)	Best Small Delegation
VI	2017	Marcy Castro	Jorge Alfonso Ramírez; Youssef Abi-fadel; Andrea Valdvieso	3 Best Delegates; Fabio Macedo (HGA); Rodrigo Guzmán (HRC); Augusto Dannon (UNHCR); 3 Outstanding Delegates; Juan Carlos Revoredo (UNSC); Sebastián Morello (WHO); Nicolás Delgado (Crisis); 1 Honorable Mention; Fabiana Chávez / Francesca Sabroso (DISEC)	Best Large Delegation
VII	2018	Milton Hidalgo	Juan Luis Salinas; Fabiana Chávez; Gonzalo Tripoli	6 Best Delegates; Alvaro Peña (DISEC); Jimena Ayala (WHO); Álvaro Luy (UNESCO); Antonella Calle (HRC); María Angélica Fernández (Crisis); Giulia Barbieri (Press Corps); 1 Outstanding Delegate; Angel Gómez (CSW); 1 Diplomacy Award; Karina Campos (UNICEF)	Best Large Delegation
VIII	2019	David Gómez	Andrea Valdivieso; Francesca Tiravanti; Paolo Ghio	3 Best Delegates; Sebastián Morello / Juan Sergio Puicon (DISEC); Jerhko Marangunich (OAS); Víctor Andrés Marroquín-Merino (Crisis); 3 Outstanding Delegates; Nicole Lindley (WHO); Felipe Núñez del Prado (HRC); Sandra Lizarzaburu (WCW); 3 Honorable Mentions; José Mariano Martínez (UNICEF); Daniela Azmouz (WCW); María Fernanda Espino (TPA)	Outstanding Large Delegation
IX	2020	Hugo Morales	Valeria Escudero; Joaquín Mejía; Sandra Lizarzaburu	3 Best Delegates; Alessia Lara (AL); Ignacio Tovar (OAS); Alejandro Robles (WIPO); 2 Outstanding Delegates; Andrea Palacios (Legal); Josemaría Soriano (UNSC); Best Position Paper; Alejandro Robles	Best Small Delegation
X	2021	Tom Oldham	José Mariano Martínez; Joaquín Mejía; Alvaro Peña; Nennele Rivadeneira	3 Best Delegates; Camila Neyra / Vasco Soldevilla (DISEC); Paula Valle (UNHCR); Javier Balbuena (IMF); 3 Outstanding Delegates; Daniella Ravelo (Legal); Mauricio Ferradas (IMF); Valerie Delgado (UNSC); 1 Honorable Mention; Fabiana Infantas (UNHCR); 1 Verbal Commendation; Priscila Vásquez (Legal); Best Position Paper; Valerie Delgado	Outstanding Large Delegation
XI	2022	Xavier Romero	Isabella Ponce de León; Juan Diego Rodríguez; Jean Paul Cerdán; Daniela Azmouz	2 Best Delegates; Mario Genit (CSW); Benjamín Espinosa (Crisis); 4 Outstanding Delegates; Javier Balbuena (ECOSOC); Santiago Galdo (WHO); Mía Ramírez (Press Corps); Franco Raffo (Crisis); 1 Honorable Mention; Bruno Bambarén (EU); 3 Verbal Commendations; Fabrizio Córdova (ECOSOC); Yube Ostos (WHO); Vasco Soldevilla (Legal)	Outstanding Large Delegation
XII	2023	Roberto Castro	Sebastián Morello; Rodrigo Guzmán; Jean Paul Cerdán; Ignacio Tovar	2 Best Delegates; María Claudia Barrios (CSW); Esteban Félix (UNSC); 3 Outstanding Delegates; Luis Antonio Bisbal / María Fé Blanco (SPECPOL); João de Cossio (NATO); Giacomo Sanguinetti (UNSC); 2 Honorable Mentions; Sebastián Díaz / Sebastián Humala (SPECPOL); Fiorella Fulchi (TPA); 3 Verbal Commendations; Ricardo Jiménez / Micaela Fuertes (SPECPOL); Diego Castañeda (CSW); Alejandro Pinto (NATO)	Outstanding Large Delegation
XIII	2024	Vania Gastulo	Sebastián Morello; Rodrigo Guzmán; Andrea Palacios; Bruno Bambarén	7 Best Delegates; Micaela Fuertes / Francesca Sansoni (GA); Vanessa Herrada (HRC); Camila Barrón (IMF); Santiago Galdo (AL); Santiago Blanes (UNSC); Liyi Xu (Crisis); Roberto Castro (Press Corps); 4 Outstanding Delegates; Sebastián Poggi / Alejandra Salvatierra (GA); Sebastián Humala (IMF); Ricardo Jiménez (EU); Mariana Aldave (AL); 1 Honorable Mention; Fabiana Delgadillo (HRC); 2 Verbal Commendations; Adriana Arana (IMF); Yube Ostos (EU)	Best Large Delegation

Since 2018, Peruvian Debate Society alumni have started to participate in PUCPMUN as part of the Substantial Affairs Team.

Session	Year	Venue	Chair
VII	2018	Pontifical Catholic University of Peru	Disarmament and International Security Committee; Inés Bullard (Director); World Health Organization; Daniela Sibina (Director); Human Rights Council; Valeria Escudero (Director); Organization of American States; Juan Sergio Puicon (Director); International Criminal Court; Joaquín Mejía (Director)
VIII	2019	Pontifical Catholic University of Peru	Disarmament and International Security Committee; Alvaro Peña (Director); United Nations Security Council; Jean Paul Cerdán (Director)
IX	2020	Pontifical Catholic University of Peru	World Intellectual Property Organization; Inés Bullard (Director); United Nations Security Council; Alvaro Peña (Director); JCC II: Cabinet of Carlos Humberto Romero, 1977; Víctor Andrés Marroquín-Merino (Director)
X	2021	Pontifical Catholic University of Peru	Legal Committee; Vania Campana (Director); International Monetary Fund; Jerhko Marangunich (Director)
XI	2022	Pontifical Catholic University of Peru	Legal Committee; Fabiana Infantas (Director); Priscila Vásquez (Director); World Health Organization; Grecia Moreyra (Assistant Director); Commission on the Status of Women; Andrea Palacios (Director); United Nations Security Council; Ignacio Tovar (Director); JCC I: Dance of the Dragons by George R.R. Martin; Rafael Tang (Director); JCC II: Dance of the Dragons by George R.R. Martin; Sofía Wong (Director)
XII	2023	Pontifical Catholic University of Peru	Special Political and Decolonization Committee; Daniela Azmouz (Co-Director); Commission on the Status of Women; Camila Neyra (Co-Director); Bruno Bambarén (Co-Director); North Atlantic Treaty Organization; Mauricio Ferradas (Co-Director)

=== Universidad del Pacífico Model United Nations (UPMUN) ===
Session	Year	Secretary General	Faculty Advisors	Individual Awards	Delegation Awards
IV	2014	Michelle Meza	Carlos Santibáñez; Martín Gallardo	4 Best Delegates; Juan Luis Salinas (SOCHUM); Jorge Alfonso Ramírez (UNICEF); Martín Gallardo (UNSC); Fabiola Ventura (UNCTD); 3 Outstanding Delegates; María Claudia Aguilar (SOCHUM); Alexander Mayor (UNICEF); Youssef Abi-fadel (UNSC); 2 Honorable Mentions; Vanessa Lam (UNICEF); Verónica Díaz (UNCTD); Best Position Paper; Fabiola Ventura; Outstanding Position Paper; Juan Luis Salinas; Honorable Position Paper; Youssef Abi-fadel	N/A
V	2015	Michelle Meza	Franco Nicolini; Alfredo Villavicencio	2 Best Delegates; Fabiola Ventura (UNDP); Jorge Alfonso Ramírez (Press Corps); 1 Honorable Mention; Daniel Huapaya (UNCIO); Honorable Position Paper; Matías Voto-Bernales	Outstanding Large Delegation
VI	2016	Karina Rodríguez	Franco Nicolini; Alfredo Villavicencio; Andrés Quesada	1 Best Delegate; María Grazia Vallejos (DISEC); 3 Outstanding Delegates; Renzo Guillén (CEDAW); Augusto Dannon (HRC); Juan Diego García (EU); Honorable Position Paper; María Grazia Vallejos	Outstanding Large Delegation
VII	2017	Karina Rodríguez	Martín Gallardo; Andrés Quesada; Francesca Sabroso; Fabiola Ventura	3 Best Delegates; María Grazia Vallejos (HRC); José Alfredo Andrés (CELAC); Valeria Escudero (SOCHUM); 2 Outstanding Delegates; Joaquín Mejía (UNSC); Isabella Ponce de León (HLPF); 2 Honorable Mentions; Valerie Woodman (HRC); Renzo Guillén (SOCHUM); 1 Verbal Commendation; Sandra Lizarzaburu (WHO); Outstanding Position Paper; Valeria Escudero; Honorable Position Paper; María Grazia Vallejos	Best Large Delegation
VIII	2018	Verónica Díaz	Angel Gómez; Antonella Calle; Gonzalo Tripoli; Francesca Tiravanti	5 Best Delegates; Rodrigo Guzmán (UNSC); Joaquín Mejía (CSTD); Isabella Ponce de León (CSW); Alejandro Prado (Legal); Sandra Lizarzaburu (SOCHUM); 1 Outstanding Delegate; Inés Bullard (ACD); 1 Honorable Mention; Juan Sergio Puicon (SOCHUM); 1 Verbal Commendation; Renato Fávaro (CSTD); Best Position Paper; Isabella Ponce de León; Honorable Position Paper; Alejandro Prado	Best Large Delegation
IX	2019	Verónica Díaz	Karina Campos; Francesca Tiravanti; Sebastián Morello; Inés Bullard	3 Best Delegates; Felipe Núñez del Prado (SPECPOL); Alvaro Peña (UNSC); José Mariano Martínez (OAS); 1 Outstanding Delegate; Camila Mendoza (HRC); 1 Honorable Mention; Miguel Prado (WHO); 2 Verbal Commendations; Jorge Lazo (SPECPOL); Almendra Advíncula (WHO); Best Position Paper; José Mariano Martínez	Outstanding Large Delegation

Since 2016, Peruvian Debate Society alumni have started to participate in UPMUN as part of the Substantial Affairs Team.

Session	Year	Venue	Chair
VI	2016	University of the Pacific	Disarmament and International Security Committee; Jorge Alfonso Ramírez (Director)
VII	2017	University of the Pacific	Social, Humanitarian and Cultural Committee; Verónica Díaz (Director); Karina Campos (Assistant Director)
VIII	2018	University of the Pacific	Social, Humanitarian and Cultural Committee; Karina Campos (Director); Andrea Valdivieso (Assistant Director); United Nations Security Council; Nicolás Delgado (Assistant Director)
IX	2019	University of the Pacific	Special Political and Decolonization Committee; Valerie Woodman (Assistant Director); World Health Organization; Francesca Sabroso (Director); United Nations Development Programme; Paolo Ghio (Director); Organization of American States; Valeria Escudero (Assistant Director); United Nations Security Council; Joaquín Mejía (Assistant Director)

=== Universidad San Ignacio de Loyola Model United Nations (USILMUN) ===
Session	Year	Secretary General	Faculty Advisors	Individual Awards	Delegation Awards
I	2014	Francisco Biber		2 Best Delegates; Juan Luis Salinas (DISEC); Andrés Quesada (UNSC); 1 Outstanding Delegate; Eduardo Dibós (UNDP)	N/A
II	2015	Francisco Biber	Franco Nicolini; Alfredo Villavicencio	3 Best Delegates; Fernanda Falcone (DISEC); Eduardo Dibós (UNESCO); Juan Carlos Revoredo (UNSC); 2 Outstanding Delegates; María Ximena Yarleque (DISEC); Andrea Valdivieso (WB); 1 Honorable Mention; Antonella Calle (UNESCO); 3 Verbal Commendations; María Fernanda Silva (WB); Carlos Marchese (UNSC); Fabiana Chávez (UNSC)	N/A
IV	2017	Diego Zapata	Andrés Quesada; Andrea Valdivieso; José Alfredo Andrés	1 Best Delegate; Angel Gómez (UNSC); 3 Honorable Mentions; Rodrigo Seminario (DISEC); Yassmín Muñoz-Nájar (HGA); Rodrigo Gamero (CSW); 2 Verbal Commendations; Juan Sergio Puicon (HGA); Lucía Haíto (UNICEF)	Outstanding Large Delegation
V	2018	Luis Suárez	José Alfredo Andrés; Isabella Ponce de León	3 Best Delegates; Valerie Woodman (UNHCR); Juan Sergio Puicon (DISEC); María Angélica Fernández / Sebastián Morello (UNSC); 2 Outstanding Delegates; Felipe Núñez del Prado (UNDP); Luis Olazábal (ICJ/ICA); 1 Honorable Mention; Jerhko Marangunich (DISEC); 2 Verbal Commendations; Ariana Arévalo (UNHCR); Camila Mendoza (ICJ/ICA)	Best Large Delegation
VI	2019	Paula Negrón	Andrea Valdivieso; Fabiana Chávez; Rodrigo Gamero; José Mariano Martínez	2 Best Delegates; Brandon Flores (ECOFIN); Nennele Rivadeneira (UNEP); 2 Outstanding Delegates; Camila García (SOCHUM); Jorge Lazo / Gonzalo Carrillo (UNSC); 1 Honorable Mention; Bruno Mazzini (ECOFIN); 3 Verbal Commendations; Almendra Advíncula (SOCHUM); Enrique Escribens (UNEP); Emilio Echeandía (CCPCJ)	Best Large Delegation
VII	2020	Andrés Pazos	Paolo Ghio; Valerie Woodman	1 Best Delegate; Nennele Rivadeneira (UNESCO); 2 Outstanding Delegates; Vania Campana (DISEC); Brandon Flores (WHO); 1 Honorable Mention; Gianella Alfaro (CSW); 1 Verbal Commendation; Gonzalo Flores (DISEC)	Outstanding Large Delegation
VIII	2021	Joaquín Ramos	Jerhko Marangunich; Felipe Núñez del Prado	2 Best Delegates; Sebastián Chávarry (DISEC); Arantxa Marangunich (WTO); 1 Outstanding Delegate; Valeria Contreras (SOCHUM)	Best Delegation
IX	2022	Fabrizzio Pérez	Juan Diego Rodríguez; Miguel Prado; Marcelo Hernández; Joyce Antón	2 Best Delegates; Fabiana Infantas (SOCHUM); Alessandra Cáceres (CSW); 4 Outstanding Delegates; Camila Neyra (DISEC); Daniela Chávez (HRC); João De Cossio (OAS); Andrea Asmat (UNSC); 3 Verbal Commendations; Mía Ramírez (DISEC); Priscila Vásquez (SOCHUM); Manuel Calderón (OAS)	Best Large Delegation
X	2023	Juan Pablo Campos	Daniela Azmouz; Mario Genit; Paula Valle; Andrea Palacios	2 Best Delegates; Alessandra Cáceres (OAS); Diego Lanza (UNSC); 3 Outstanding Delegates; Bruno Bambarén / Mariana Aldave (DISEC); Yube Ostos (Legal); Vanessa Herrada (UNDP); 3 Honorable Mentions; Camila Neyra (SOCHUM); Fabrizio Córdova (OAS); Juan Diego Rodríguez (UN Women); 3 Verbal Commendations; Camila Barrón (SOCHUM); Natalie Fistrovic (UN Women); Alberto Varillas (UNSC)	Outstanding Large Delegation
XI	2024	Alejandra Lecaros Talavera	Rodrigo Guzmán; Camila Neyra; Paula Valle	5 Best Delegates; Luis Antonio Bisbal (DISEC); Fabrizio Córdova (SOCHUM); Natalie Fistrovic (Legal); Valentina Ursino (UNEA); Benjamín Espinosa (UNSC); 2 Outstanding Delegates; Jorge Medina (Legal); Matías Paulette (UNEA); 1 Honorable Mention; Luis José Beingolea (Crisis); 1 Verbal Commendation; Michelangelo Muñóz / Mariana Castillo (SPECPOL)	Best Large Delegation

Since 2016, Peruvian Debate Society alumni have started to participate in USILMUN as part of the Substantial Affairs Team.

Session	Year	Venue	Chair
IV	2017	Universidad San Ignacio de Loyola	Commission on the Status of Women; Rodrigo Guzmán (Assistant Director); United Nations Security Council; Joaquín Mejía (Assistant Director)
V	2018	Universidad San Ignacio de Loyola	Disarmament and International Security Committee; Inés Bullard (Director); United Nations Security Council, 1990; Rodrigo Guzmán (Assistant Director); International Court of Justice, 1984 / International Court of Arbitration, 2015; Joaquín Mejía (Director)
VI	2019	Universidad San Ignacio de Loyola	Economic and Financial Committee; Jerhko Marangunich (Director); Social, Humanitarian, and Cultural Committee; Angel Gómez (Director)
VII	2020	Universidad San Ignacio de Loyola	World Health Organization; Daniel Huapaya (Director); José Renán Rivas (Director)
IX	2022	Universidad San Ignacio de Loyola	Disarmament and International Security Committee; Ignacio Tovar (Assistant Director); Social, Humanitarian, and Cultural Committee; Daniela Azmouz (Assistant Director); Commission on the Status of Women; Paula Valle (Director)
X	2023	Universidad San Ignacio de Loyola	Disarmament and International Security Committee; Ignacio Tovar (Director); Social, Humanitarian, and Cultural Committee; Sofía Wong (Assistant Director); United Nations Development Programme; Andrea Asmat (Assistant Director); Organization of American States; Fabiana Infantas (Director); United Nations Security Committee; Vasco Soldevilla (Assistant Director)
XI	2024	Universidad San Ignacio de Loyola	Social, Humanitarian, and Cultural Committee; Santiago Galdo (Assistant Director); Legal Committee; Yube Ostos (Director); Roberto Castro (Assistant Director); United Nations Environment Assembly; Bruno Bambarén (Director)

=== Universidad Privada del Norte Model United Nations (UPNMUN) ===
Session	Year	Secretary General	Faculty Advisors	Individual Awards
I	2019	Omar Acuña	Yassmín Muñoz-Nájar; Isabella Ponce de León; Alvaro Peña	1 Best Delegate; Vania Campana / Juan Luis Kruger (DISEC); 1 Outstanding Delegate; María Fernanda Espino (Press Corps); 1 Honorable Mention; Rodrigo Toledo (UNSC); 1 Verbal Commendation; Alejandro Novoa (UNDP)

=== International Delegation of Peru Model United Nations (IDPMUN) ===
Session	Year	Secretary General	Faculty Advisors	Individual Awards	Delegation Awards
I	2014	Alfredo Villavicencio		1 Best Delegate; Youssef Abi-fadel (UNSC)	N/A
II	2015	Giorgio Baglietto		1 Best Delegate; Juan Diego García (UNDP); 3 Outstanding Delegates; Fernanda Falcone (SOCHUM); Juan Carlos Revoredo (UNSC); Antonella Calle (EU); 3 Honorable Mentions; Mariano Aliaga (DISEC); Nicolás Delgado (UNSC); Daniella Liendo (OIC); 2 Verbal Commendations; Rodrigo Rivadeneira (OIC); Nicole Acosta (OIC)	N/A
III	2016	Pablo Sánchez		2 Best Delegates; André Díaz (Crisis); José Luis Valdera (Crisis Press Corps); 4 Outstanding Delegates; Francesca Sabroso (SOCHUM); Astrid Heredia (WHO); Cristián Carrión (HRC); Rodrigo Guzmán (OAS); 1 Honorable Mention; Abigail Espinosa / María Paz Azula (DISEC); 1 Verbal Commendation; Álvaro Luy / Marcela Shiroma (DISEC)	Did not attend as Delegation
IV	2017	Fahed Forero	Nicolás Delgado	5 Best Delegates; Angel Gómez (SPECPOL); Juan Sergio Puicon (CELAC); Paolo Ghio (EU); Rodrigo Guzmán (UNSC); Andrea Morante (Press Corps); 4 Outstanding Delegates; Alvaro Peña (UNCTD); Alejandro Prado (UNICEF); Víctor Andrés Marroquín-Merino (Peruvian Congress); André Díaz (Crisis); 1 Verbal Commendation; Valeria Rivadeneira (Press Corps)	Best Large Delegation
V	2018	Elías Casanova	Angel Gómez; Daniela Mejía	2 Best Delegates; Isabella Ponce de León (UNEP); Alejandro Céspedes (Press Corps); 2 Outstanding Delegates; Álvaro Luy / Inés Bullard (DISEC); Nicole Lindley / Almendra Advíncula (SOCHUM); 2 Honorable Mentions; Alejandro Prado (UNAIDS); Emilio Echeandía (Peruvian Congress)	
VI	2019	José Luis Ludeña	Isabella Ponce de León; Yassmín Muñoz-Nájar; Fabio Macedo; Alvaro Peña	3 Outstanding Delegates; Felipe Núñez del Prado (DISEC); Emilio Sopprani / Andrea Briceño (UNSC); Hiroshi Román (Press Corps); 1 Honorable Mention; Miguel Prado (EU); 2 Verbal Commendations; Ariana Flores (DISEC); William Gálvez / Ana Paula Gálvez (UNSC)	

Since 2016, Peruvian Debate Society alumni have started to participate in IDPMUN as part of the Substantial Affairs Team.

Session	Year	Venue	Chair
3	2016	ESAN University; Pontifical Catholic University of Peru	World Health Organization; José Renán Rivas (Assistant Director)
4	2017	ESAN University	Special Political and Decolonization Committee; Augusto Dannon (Director); United Nations Conference on Trade and Development; Gustavo Taboada (Director); María Grazia Vallejos (Assistant Director); European Union; María del Pilar Lindley (Director); JCC: Berlin Wall Crisis, 1961; José Luis Valdera (Coordinating Crisis Director); Press Corps; Francesca Sabroso (Director)
5	2018	ESAN University	Organization of American States; María del Pilar Lindley (Director); Arctic Council; Juan Sergio Puicon (Assistant Director); League of Arab States; Yassmín Muñoz-Nájar (Director)
6	2019	ESAN University	University Committees; Disarmament and International Security Committee; Sebastián Morello (Assistant Director); European Union; María del Pilar Lindley (Director); Press Corps; Francesca Tiravanti (Director); High School Committees; Social, Humanitarian and Cultural Committee; General Assembly: Marvel; Gustavo Taboada (Director); Cities Summit; Valeria Escudero (Assistant Director)

=== Modelo de Naciones Unidas del Perú (MONUP) ===
Session	Year	Faculty Advisor	Individual Awards	Delegation Awards
1	2015		1 Best Delegate; José Alfredo Andrés (JCC: Peruvian Cabinet, 1879); 1 Outstanding Delegate; Juan Carlos Revoredo (Papal Conclave, 1492); 1 Honorable Mention; Antonella Calle (Cabinet of Ollanta Humala, 2016); Best Role Play; Mariano Aliaga (JCC: Chilean Cabinet, 1879)	Best Delegation

== See also ==
- Model United Nations
- United Schools of Peru (MUN)
- Promotora Internacional de Debates - Perú
- Harvard International Relations Council
- Harvard World Model United Nations
