= Gaidai =

Gaidai may refer to:

- Gaidai (surname)
- Kansai Gaidai University in Japan.
  - Kansai Gaidai College
- Kyoto Gaidai Nishi High School
- 8451 Gaidai, an asteroid
