= Heyday =

Heyday may refer to:

- Heyday (The Church album), 1986
- Heyday (Fairport Convention album), 1987
- Heyday (song), a 2000 song by Mic Christopher
- Heyday (novel), a historical novel by Kurt Andersen
- Heyday Books, an independent nonprofit publisher based in Berkeley, California
- Heyday Films, a British film production company
- Heyday Records, an independent record label founded in 1988 by Pat Thomas
- Heyday (horse) (born 1987)
- Hey Day, a tradition at the University of Pennsylvania

== See also ==
- Hayday, an English surname
- Hay Day, a mobile farming game
