= Haidai =

Haidai may refer to:

- Haidai (surname)
- Haidai Region (海岱), region of Shandong, China east of Mount Tai
- Kombu, or haidai 海带 in Chinese
