= Hayday =

Hayday is an English surname that originated in Brittany. Notable people with the surname include:

- Adrian Hayday, English professor
- Andria Hayday, American game designer
- Arthur Hayday, English unionist and politician
- Frederick Hayday, British unionist
- James Hayday, London bookbinder

Other uses include:

- Hayday (album), from American indie rock band Feeble Little Horse

== See also ==
- Haidai (surname)
- Hay Day, a freemium mobile farming game by Supercell
- Heyday (disambiguation)
