= United Schools of Peru (MUN) =

Student club in Lima, Peru

- Abbreviation: USP
- Formation: 2015
- Headquarters: Lima, Peru
- Senior Advisors: Gustavo Taboada; Franco Nicolini; María del Pilar Lindley; Ximena Campos
- Main organ: PRIDE Peru Board of Directors
- Website: http://unitedschoolsofperu.org

United Schools of Peru (USP) is an inter-school student club headquartered in Lima, Peru, aimed to promote debate and discussion on current national and international issues in order to form leading citizens who contribute to development by participating in Model United Nations (MUN) conferences. Beginning its participation in international conferences in 2016, it gained widespread recognition by achieving in their debut the Best International Delegation award at the Ivy League Model United Nations Conference organized by the International Affairs Association of the University of Pennsylvania, achieving the title in the 2016, 2018, 2019 and 2020 editions.

United Schools of Peru is one of the founding projects led by the Promotora Internacional de Debates - Perú (PRIDE Peru for its Spanish acronym) associates.

== Faculty Advisors ==
Senior Advisors in bold

=== 2015–2016 season ===
Office	Faculty Advisor	Education	Conferences	Experience
**Senior Advisor**	Gustavo Taboada	Law, University of Lima	Ivy League Model United Nations Conference XXXII; Boston Invitational Model United Nations XV	Honorable Mention (HNMUN 2010); College-level Faculty Advisor
**Senior Advisor**	María del Pilar Lindley	Industrial Engineering, University of Lima	-	Diplomacy Award (WorldMUN 2013); Honorable Mention (HNMUN 2015); College-level Faculty Advisor
**Senior Advisor**	Franco Nicolini	Law, University of Lima	Ivy League Model United Nations Conference XXXII; Boston Invitational Model United Nations XV	College-level Faculty Advisor
Faculty Advisor	Alfredo Villavicencio	Economics, Pontifical Catholic University of Peru	Boston Invitational Model United Nations XV	Diplomacy Award (WorldMUN 2014)
Junior Faculty Advisor	Angel Gómez	Law, University of Lima	Ivy League Model United Nations Conference XXXII; Boston Invitational Model United Nations XV	College-level Delegate

=== 2016–2017 season ===
Office	Faculty Advisor	Education	Conferences	Experience
**Senior Advisor**	Gustavo Taboada	Law, University of Lima	Ivy League Model United Nations Conference XXXIII; WFUNA International Model United Nations 2017	Honorable Mention (HNMUN 2010); College-level Delegate; College-level Faculty Advisor
**Senior Advisor**	María del Pilar Lindley	Industrial Engineering, University of Lima	Ivy League Model United Nations Conference XXXIII; WFUNA International Model United Nations 2017	Diplomacy Award (WorldMUN 2013); Honorable Mention (HNMUN 2015); Diplomacy Award (WorldMUN 2016); College-level Delegate; College-level Faculty Advisor
**Senior Advisor**	Franco Nicolini	Law, University of Lima	Ivy League Model United Nations Conference XXXIII; WFUNA International Model United Nations 2017	College-level Faculty Advisor
Faculty Advisor	Angel Gómez	Law, University of Lima	Ivy League Model United Nations Conference XXXIII; WFUNA International Model United Nations 2017	College-level Delegate

=== 2017–2018 season ===
Office	Faculty Advisor	Education	Conferences	Experience
**Senior Advisor**	Gustavo Taboada	Law, University of Lima	Ivy League Model United Nations Conference XXXIV; WFUNA International Model United Nations 2018	Honorable Mention (HNMUN 2010); College-level Delegate; College-level Faculty Advisor
**Senior Advisor**	María del Pilar Lindley	Industrial Engineering, University of Lima	Ivy League Model United Nations Conference XXXIV; WFUNA International Model United Nations 2018	Diplomacy Award (WorldMUN 2013); Honorable Mention (HNMUN 2015); Diplomacy Award (WorldMUN 2016); College-level Delegate; College-level Faculty Advisor
**Senior Advisor**	Franco Nicolini	Law, University of Lima	Ivy League Model United Nations Conference XXXIV; WFUNA International Model United Nations 2018	College-level Faculty Advisor
Faculty Advisor	Angel Gómez	Law, University of Lima	Ivy League Model United Nations Conference XXXIV; WFUNA International Model United Nations 2018	College-level Delegate
Faculty Advisor	Diego Galdo	Political Science & Government, Pontifical Catholic University of Peru	Ivy League Model United Nations Conference XXXIV; WFUNA International Model United Nations 2018	Verbal Commendation (ILMUNC XXXII); Outstanding Delegate (ILMUNC XXXIII)
Faculty Advisor	Ximena Campos	Law, University of Lima	Ivy League Model United Nations Conference XXXIV; WFUNA International Model United Nations 2018	Honorable Mention (ILMUNC XXXIII)
Faculty Advisor	Cayetano García	Communication, University of Lima	Ivy League Model United Nations Conference XXXIV; WFUNA International Model United Nations 2018	High School Delegate
Faculty Advisor	Cristián Carrión	Communication, University of Lima	-	Verbal Commendation (ILMUNC XXXII); Best Delegate (BosMUN 2016); Diplomacy Award (WorldMUN 2017); College-level Delegate

=== 2018–2019 season ===
Office	Faculty Advisor	Education	Conferences	Experience
**Senior Advisor**	Gustavo Taboada	Law, University of Lima	Ivy League Model United Nations Conference XXXV; North American Invitational Model United Nations LVI	Honorable Mention (HNMUN 2010); College-level Delegate; College-level Faculty Advisor
**Senior Advisor**	María del Pilar Lindley	Industrial Engineering, University of Lima	Ivy League Model United Nations Conference XXXV; North American Invitational Model United Nations LVI	Diplomacy Award (WorldMUN 2013); Honorable Mention (HNMUN 2015); Diplomacy Award (WorldMUN 2016); College-level Delegate; College-level Faculty Advisor
**Senior Advisor**	Franco Nicolini	Law, University of Lima	Ivy League Model United Nations Conference XXXV; North American Invitational Model United Nations LVI	College-level Faculty Advisor
Faculty Advisor	Angel Gómez	Law, University of Lima	Ivy League Model United Nations Conference XXXV; North American Invitational Model United Nations LVI	Diplomatic Commendation (HNMUN 2018); College-level Delegate; College-level Faculty Advisor
Faculty Advisor	Ximena Campos	Law, University of Lima	Ivy League Model United Nations Conference XXXV; North American Invitational Model United Nations LVI	Honorable Mention (ILMUNC XXXIII)
Faculty Advisor	Manuel Calderón	Law, University of Lima	Ivy League Model United Nations Conference XXXV; North American Invitational Model United Nations LVI	Outstanding Delegate (ILMUNC XXXIV)
Faculty Advisor	Carlos Orbegoso	History and Economics, Fordham University	Ivy League Model United Nations Conference XXXV; North American Invitational Model United Nations LVI	Diplomacy Award (WIMUN 2017)
Faculty Advisor	Cristián Carrión	Communication, University of Lima	-	Verbal Commendation (ILMUNC XXXII); Best Delegate (BosMUN 2016); Diplomacy Award (WorldMUN 2017); College-level Delegate
Faculty Advisor	Andrés Pazos	International Relations, Universidad San Ignacio de Loyola	-	College-level Delegate

=== 2019–2020 season ===
Office	Faculty Advisor	Education	Conferences	Experience
**Senior Advisor**	Gustavo Taboada	Law, University of Lima	Ivy League Model United Nations Conference XXXVI	Honorable Mention (HNMUN 2010); College-level Delegate; College-level Faculty Advisor
**Senior Advisor**	María del Pilar Lindley	Industrial Engineering, University of Lima	Ivy League Model United Nations Conference XXXVI	Diplomacy Award (WorldMUN 2013); Honorable Mention (HNMUN 2015); Diplomacy Award (WorldMUN 2016); College-level Delegate; College-level Faculty Advisor
**Senior Advisor**	Franco Nicolini	Law, University of Lima	Ivy League Model United Nations Conference XXXVI	College-level Faculty Advisor
**Senior Advisor**	Ximena Campos	Law, University of Lima	Ivy League Model United Nations Conference XXXVI	Honorable Mention (ILMUNC XXXIII)
Faculty Advisor	Franco Beramendi	Political Science, CEU Cardinal Herrera University	-	Verbal Commendation (ILMUNC XXXII); Best Delegate (ILMUNC XXXIV)
Faculty Advisor	Fabiana Kawakami	Communication, University of Lima	-	Position Paper Award (WIMUN 2017)

== Ivy League Model United Nations Conference Participation ==
Generation	Session	Year	Representing	Faculty Advisors	Head Delegate	Individual Awards	Delegation Awards
I	31	2016	State of Palestine Médicins Sans Frontières	Gustavo Taboada; Franco Nicolini; Angel Gómez	Abigail Espinosa	1 Honorable Mention; Abigail Espinosa / Araceli Vinci-Cannava (SOCHUM); 2 Verbal Commendations; Camila Burmester / Cristián Carrión (DISEC); Diego Galdo / Franco Beramendi (SPECPOL)	Best International Delegation
II	33	2017	Ukraine Daily Nation	Gustavo Taboada; María del Pilar Lindley; Franco Nicolini; Angel Gómez	Diego Galdo	1 Outstanding Delegate; Diego Galdo (UNFPA); 1 Honorable Mention; Ximena Campos (ILO); 2 Verbal Commendations; Philippe Chabaneix (CSD); Sebastián Campillo (TPA)	
III	34	2018	State of Japan; Federative Republic of Brazil	Gustavo Taboada; María del Pilar Lindley; Franco Nicolini; Angel Gómez; Diego Galdo; Ximena Campos; Cayetano García	Sebastián Campillo	1 Best Delegate; Franco Beramendi (FIFA); 1 Outstanding Delegate; Manuel Calderón / Tais Ruiz (LoN); 2 Honorable Mentions; Felipe Núñez del Prado / Bianca Portocarrero (UNODC); Santiago Félix / Adriana Diez (SST); 5 Verbal Commendations; Sergio Atarama / Jorge Lazo (Legal); Roberto Boschieri / Shadia Muñoz-Nájar (UNESCAP); Chiara Debernardi (UN-Habitat); Alexis Durand (British Parliament); María Gracia Gálvez (Pacific Alliance)	Best International Delegation
IV	35	2019	Republic of South Africa; Republic of Tajikistan; Commonwealth of Australia	Gustavo Taboada; María del Pilar Lindley; Franco Nicolini; Angel Gómez; Ximena Campos; Manuel Calderón; Carlos Orbegoso	Philippe Chabaneix; Vasco Soldevilla	1 Best Delegate; Nennele Rivadeneira (ECOWAS); 1 Outstanding Delegate; Philippe Chabaneix (ASEAN); 4 Honorable Mentions; Vasco Soldevilla / Leonardo Paz (DISEC); Chiara Debernardi / María José Martinez (SPECPOL); Valeria Chang / Lucía Revollar (UNHCR); Ignacio Novoa / Gabriela Villacorta (UNOPS); 4 Verbal Commendations; Mickaella Ramos / Andrea Palacios (SOCHUM); Alexia Gamboa / Rodrigo Temoche (WHO); Joaquin Deheza / Rodrigo Toledo (CND); Juan Diego Rodríguez (UN-SPIDER)	Best International Delegation
V	36	2020	Kingdom of Norway; Republic of Austria; Republic of South Sudan	Gustavo Taboada; María del Pilar Lindley; Franco Nicolini; Ximena Campos	N/A	1 Outstanding Delegate; Gian Marco Pasapera (Crisis); 1 Honorable Mention; Camila Arbe / Alba Rentería (SOCHUM); 1 Verbal Commendation; Stefano Raffo / Verónica Vargas (UNEP)	Best International Delegation

== WFUNA International Model United Nations Participation ==
Generation	Year	Faculty Advisors	Individual Awards	Delegation Awards
II	2017	Gustavo Taboada; Franco Nicolini; María del Pilar Lindley; Angel Gómez	5 Diplomacy Awards; Carlos Orbegoso (GA 3); Alonso Macedo (GA 3); Piero Sauñe (GA 4); Roberto Boschieri (GA 6); Giulia Barbieri / María Angélica Fernández (UNSC); 4 Position Paper Awards; Santiago Félix (GA 1); Mariana Peschiera (GA 2); Sebastián Campillo (GA 7); Philippe Chabaneix / Fabiana Kawakami (UNSC)	Best Large Delegation High School Division
III	2018	Gustavo Taboada; María del Pilar Lindley; Franco Nicolini; Angel Gómez; Diego Galdo; Ximena Campos; Cayetano García	14 Diplomacy Awards; Shadia Muñoz-Nájar (GA 1); Joaquín Saco (GA 1); Felipe Núñez del Prado (GA 2); Marcelo Remond (GA 2); Sergio Atarama (GA 3); Joaquín Deheza (GA 3); Chiara Debernardi (GA 4); Franco Beramendi (GA 4); Jorge Lazo (GA 5); Leonardo Paz (GA 5); María José Martínez (GA 6); Tais Ruiz (GA 6); Fabrizio Agustini (GA 7); Isabella Carrera (GA 9); 4 Position Paper Awards; María Gracia Gálvez (GA 5); Adriana Diez (GA 6); Luke Velasco (GA 6); Bianca Portocarrero (GA 9)	Best Large Delegation High School Division

== Invitational Model United Nations Circuit Conferences Participation ==
=== Boston Invitational Model United Nations Conference (BosMUN) ===
Generation	Session	Year	Representing	Faculty Advisors	Head Delegate	Individual Awards	Delegation Awards
I	15	2016	United Kingdom of Great Britain and Northern Ireland; Republic of the Sudan	Gustavo Taboada; Franco Nicolini; Alfredo Villavicencio; Angel Gómez	Abigail Espinosa	2 Best Delegates; Philippe Chabaneix (Commonwealth of Nations); Cristián Carrión (Crisis); 3 Outstanding Delegates; Diego Galdo (AU); Araceli Vinci-Cannava (Crisis); María Angélica Fernández (Crisis); 1 Honorable Mention; Enrique Rodríguez (DISEC)	Best International Delegation

=== North American Invitational Model United Nations (NAIMUN) ===
Generation	Session	Year	Representing	Faculty Advisors	Head Delegate	Individual Awards
IV	LVI	2019	Federative Republic of Brazil; Republic of Cuba	Gustavo Taboada; María del Pilar Lindley; Franco Nicolini; Angel Gómez; Ximena Campos; Manuel Calderón; Carlos Orbegoso	Nennele Rivadeneira; Vasco Soldevilla	1 Best Delegate; Ariana Calvo (Press Corps); 2 Outstanding Delegates; Alexia Gamboa / Nennele Rivadeneira (UNESCO); Gian Marco Pasapera (Crisis); 1 Book Award; Jorge Medina / Salvador Breña (OAS); 2 Honorable Mentions; María José Martínez (House of Commons); Sebastián Ramos (Crisis); 3 Verbal Commendations; Ignacio Novoa / Gabriela Villacorta (DISEC); Mickaella Ramos / Andrea Palacios (SOCHUM); Rodrigo Temoche / Rodrigo Toledo (SPECPOL)
