= Promotora Internacional de Debates - Perú =

Promotora Internacional de Debates Perú
- Abbreviation: PRIDE Perú
- Formation: 2014
- Headquarters: Lima, Peru
- President: Gustavo Taboada
- Main organ: Board of Directors
- Website: https://prideperu.org

Promotora Internacional de Debates - Perú (English: International Promoter of Debates - Peru) is a non-profit civil association dedicated to the promotion of debate and academic competences as educational tools, as well as to encourage the development of soft skills in students and professionals.

The institution conducts various debating conferences and competitions in Peru and abroad, the most popular being Model United Nations conferences organized in partnership with Ivy League colleges, such as the University of Pennsylvania and Harvard University. Among these projects, PRIDE Peru has served as Host Team for the Ivy League Model United Nations Conference - Peru four times, and the Harvard National Model United Nations - Latin America in two consecutive occasions.

== Projects ==
=== United Schools of Peru ===
United Schools of Peru is the first Peruvian inter-school international debate team, aimed to promote debate and discussion on current national and international issues in order to form leading citizens who contribute to development by participating in Model United Nations (MUN) conferences. Beginning its participation in international conferences in 2016, it gained widespread recognition by achieving in their debut the Best International Delegation award at the Ivy League Model United Nations Conference organized by the International Affairs Association of the University of Pennsylvania, achieving the title in the 2016, 2018, 2019 and 2020 editions.

Also participants of the WFUNA International Model United Nations held in the United Nations Headquarters in New York City, USP has garnered twice the Best Large Delegation - High School Division Award (2017 and 2018).

=== Ivy League Model United Nations Conference - Peru ===
Ivy League Model United Nations Conference is the flagship conference of the University of Pennsylvania, hosting over 34 editions in Philadelphia, Pennsylvania. In Peru, ILMUNC has been established as a regional edition of the conference, starting its run in 2016, being the only international school-only conference in the country.

=== Harvard National Model United Nations - Latin America ===
Harvard National Model United Nations - Latin America is the regional edition of the most prestigious and oldest Model United Nations conference in history, Harvard National Model United Nations. Directed by undergraduate students from Harvard University through the Harvard International Relations Council, the conference has been held in four occasions in Peru, and twice in partnership with PRIDE Peru.

=== High School MUN Conferences ===
==== Villa Maria Model United Nations ====
Villa María Model United Nations is the school conference of the Villa María (La Planicie) School. Its first edition in 2015 marked a milestone for the history of Model United Nations in Peru, which at that moment, was the largest conference held in the country.

==== Villa Caritas & San Pedro Model United Nations ====
Villa Caritas & San Pedro Model United Nations is the school conference of the sodalite Villa Caritas (for girls) and San Pedro (for boys) schools located in La Molina District. PRIDE has organized VSCPMUN in three occasions: 2016, 2017 and 2019.

==== Raimondi Model United Nations ====
Raimondi Model United Nations is the school conference of the Antonio Raimondi Italian School, being for the first time held in 2018. RaiMUN is the first trilingual Model United Nations conference in Peru, offering an Italian-spoken committee for high schools students.

== See also ==
- Model United Nations
- Harvard National Model United Nations
- Harvard World Model United Nations
