= Mávila Huertas =

Peruvian writer and journalist (born 1970)

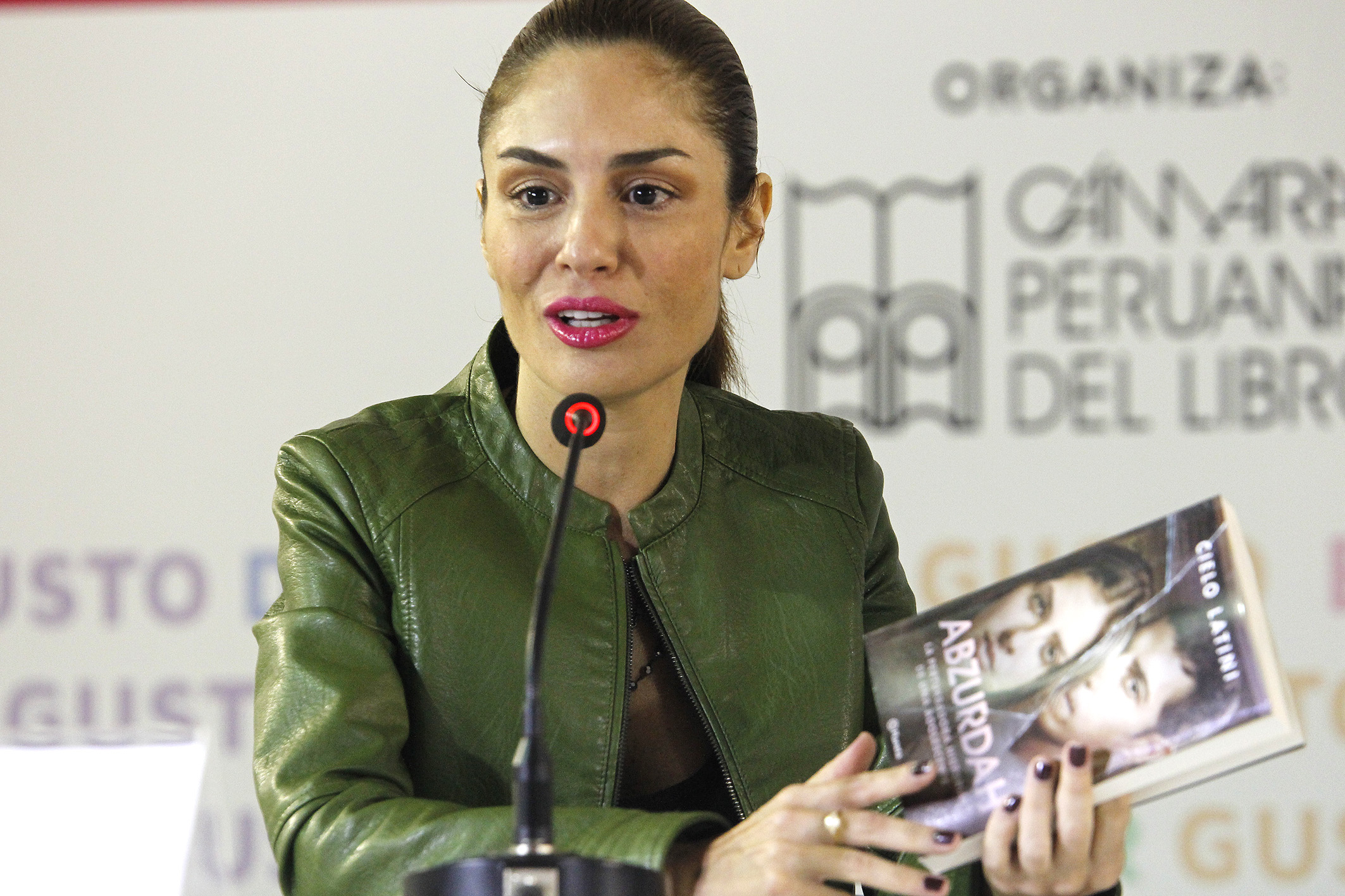
- Huertas in 2015
- Born: Mávila Milagros Huertas Centurión; 24 December 1970 (age 55); Arequipa, Peru
- Education: University of Lima
- Occupations: Journalist, writer, actress, radio and television presenter
- Years active: 1992 – present
- Height: 1.62 m (5 ft 4 in)
- Spouse: Roberto Reátegui (2009–2013)

Mávila Milagros Huertas Centurión (born 24 December 1970) is a Peruvian journalist, writer, actress, and radio and television presenter.

== Biography ==
The daughter of José Huertas and Amarilis Centurión, Mávila studied communication sciences at the University of Lima. She later contributed to the magazine Somos and was the main editor of the magazine Intercambio.

In 1992, Huertas began to work as an investigative reporter for several television channels. She put together the journalistic team of Contrapunto on Latina Televisión and later worked under the direction of César Hildebrandt on the program La Clave. She was in charge of producing reports for América Noticias and Primera Edición on América Televisión.

On Panamericana Televisión, Huertas hosted the programs Buenos Días, Perú and Reportajes, as well as presenting the news show ATV Noticias on ATV.

For several years she taught journalism at the Universidad Peruana de Ciencias Aplicadas.

In 2001 she won the third National Journalism Competition in the category of Best Television Report for "Milagro en Sonene", about Taricaya turtle conservation efforts in native communities in the Peruvian jungle.

In 2003 she participated as an actress in the Argentine feature film Ojos que no ven, alongside Patricia Pereyra, Carlos Alcántara, Gustavo Bueno, and Gianfranco Brero. She also acted in the short film Desaparecida.

Later she headed the central edition of the news program América Noticias on América Televisión. As an announcer, she briefly hosted the news show Hoy por Hoy on CPN Radio.

In 2009, she published the book Los Reyes del Mambo: diez historias para entender el éxito en el Perú (The Kings of Mambo: Ten Stories to Understand Success in Peru).

Huertas married producer Roberto Reátegui in December 2009. They divorced in May 2013.

In 2011 she wrote and directed the documentary Machu Picchu, la joya del emperador (Machu Picchu, The Jewel of the Emperor).

In 2012 she wrote and directed her second documentary, Amazonas, la ruta indomable (Amazonas, the Indomitable Route).

In mid-2013 Huertas shot Frontera azul, mar peruano (Blue Border, Peruvian Sea), completing the documentary trilogy.

== Television work ==
=== Presenter ===
- Primero a las 8 (Canal N, 2013 – present)
- Pequeños gigantes (América Televisión, 2013), guest judge
- América Noticias - Edición Central (América Televisión, 2004 – present)
- ATV Noticias (Andina de Televisión, 2003–2004)
- Reportajes (Panamericana Televisión, 2002–2003)
- Buenos Días, Perú (Panamericana Televisión, 2001–2003)
- América Noticias - Primera Edición (América Televisión, 1999–2001)

=== Reporter ===
- La Clave
- Contrapunto
