= Kansai Gaidai College =

Coordinates: 34°49′24.3″N 135°39′50.5″E

- 関西外国語大学短期大学部
- Type: private
- Established: 1953
- Location: Hirakata, Osaka, Japan
- Website: http://www.kansaigaidai.ac.jp

Kansai Gaidai College (関西外国語大学短期大学部, Kansai Gaikokugo Daigaku Tanki Daigakubu) is a private junior college in Hirakata, Osaka, Japan. It was established as a junior college in 1953, and is now attached to Kansai Gaidai University.

== Departments ==
- Department of English studies
