= University of Lima =

Private nonprofit university in Lima, Peru

Coordinates: 12.0848°S 76.9708°W

- Universidad de Lima
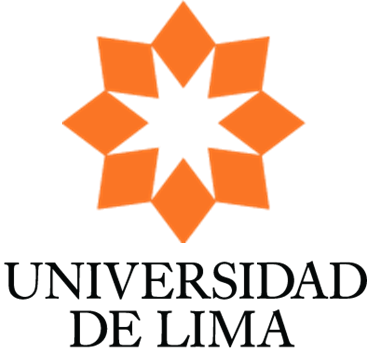
- Motto: Scientia et praxis (Knowledge and practice)
- Type: Private Research University
- Established: 25 April 1962
- Affiliations: Consortium of Universities; UDUAL, Asociación Columbus
- Rector: Patricia Stuart Alvarado
- Academic staff: 678
- Students: 28,000 (2025)
- Undergraduates: 26,000
- Postgraduates: 2,000
- Location: Lima, Peru
- Campus: Urban 6 acres (2.4 ha)
- Colors: Orange; White; Gray
- Website: www.ulima.edu.pe

The University of Lima (Spanish: Universidad de Lima; IPA: [uniβeɾsiˈðað ðe ˈlima]; ) is a private research university in Lima, Peru. Its influence, wealth, and rankings have made it one of the most prestigious universities in the country.

Established on April 25, 1962; the decision to create the University of Lima was made in 1960 by a group of college professors, along with commerce and industry representatives, which gathered in the PRODIES Civil Association (Promotion of Industrial Development through Higher Education). It started operations after two years of research and development. At first, they only enrolled 120 students in a small campus in the Jesús María District. Due to the university's quick growth (particularly due to its business program), a new campus in the Monterrico neighbourhood of Santiago de Surco was inaugurated on August 27, 1966, to serve the university's space needs.

Since 1996, it is part of the Consortium of Universities as a founding member. It is formed by other 3 private higher education institutes considered the best in their respective fields; the Pontifical Catholic University of Peru specializing in social studies, Universidad del Pacífico in economics, and Cayetano Heredia University in medicine.

Today, the University of Lima enrolls over 28,000 students, has 14 majors organized in 7 faculties, a postgraduate school, a general studies program, a scientific research institute and international relations with other universities worldwide; along with many services for students, faculty, and the community at large. It produced a vice president, an attorney general, an aristocrat and multiple congressmen, ministers and politicians; as well as numerous writers, scholars, socialites and journalists which are stronghold and relevant names in Peruvian society.

It is consistently ranked among the top 5 institutes of higher education in Peru, top 80 in Latin America and one of the leading 1000 universities in the world.

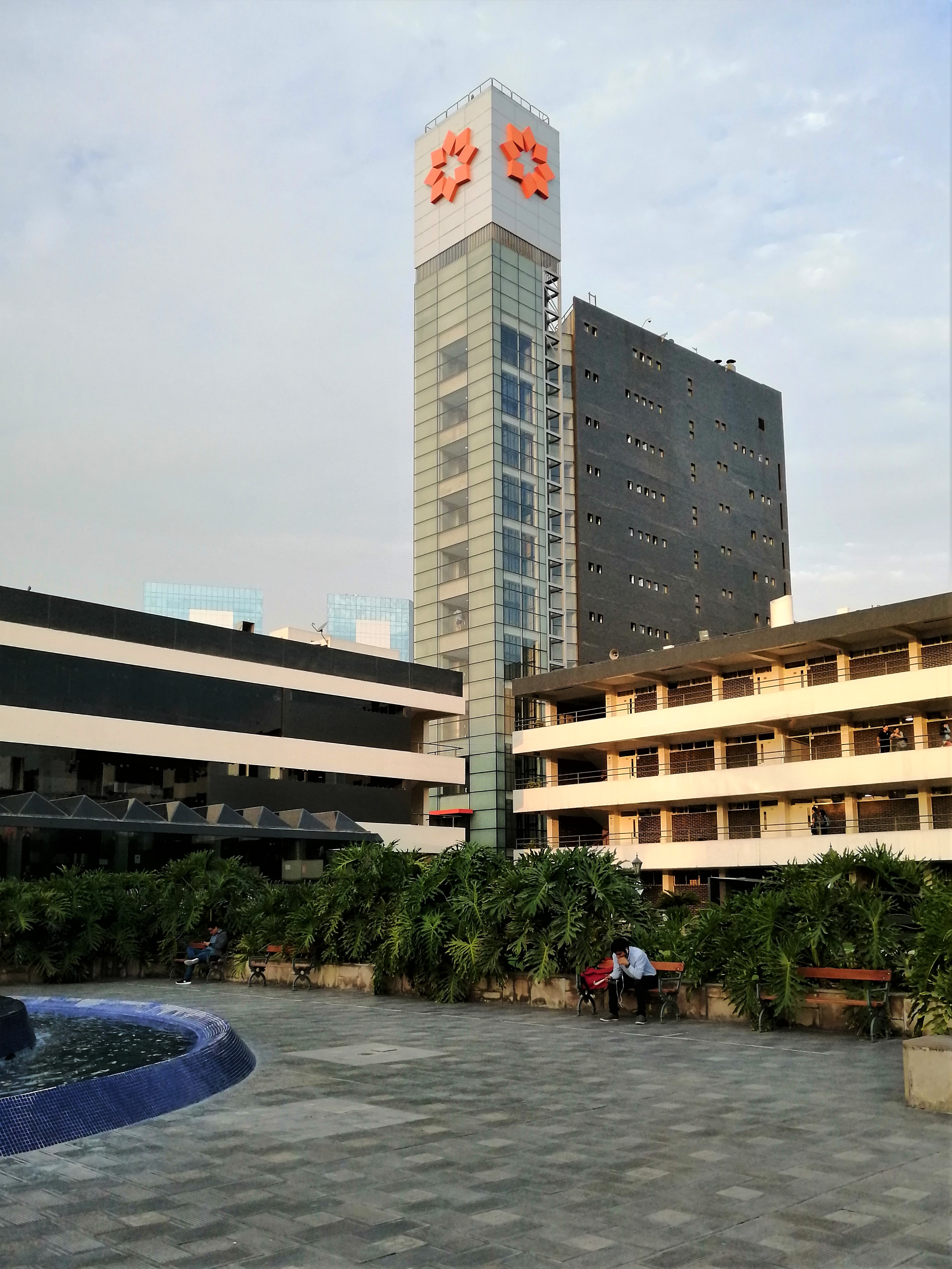
Campus in Santiago de Surco, Lima

== Academics ==
=== Faculties ===
The University of Lima has 7 faculties and the General Studies Program in which 14 undergraduate programs are offered.

==== Faculty of Architecture ====
- Architecture

==== Faculty of Business ====
- Accounting and Finance
- International Business
- Management
- Marketing

==== Faculty of Communications ====
- Communications

==== Faculty of Economics ====
- Economics

==== Faculty of Engineering ====
- Civil Engineering
- Environmental Engineering
- Industrial Engineering
- Mechatronics Engineering
- Systems Engineering

==== Faculty of Psychology ====
- Psychology

==== Faculty of Law ====
- Law

== Notable alumni ==
- Mario Bellatin (born 1960), Mexican novelist
- Liz Benavides (born 1969), lawyer, Peru's attorney general
- Carlos Bruce de Oca (born 1957), politician
- Enrique Javier Cornejo Ramirez, politician
- Mávila Huertas (born 1970), journalist, writer, actress, and radio and television presenter
- Alex Kouri (born 1964), lawyer and politician
- Daniel Mora (born 1945), military officer and politician
- Ricardo Morán Vargas (born 1974), communicator, producer and director
- Beto Ortiz (born 1968), journalist and writer
- Alessandra de Osma (born 1988), wife of Christian of Hannover
- Milena Warthon (born 2000), singer-songwriter
