= University of Pennsylvania student life =

The University of Pennsylvania student life includes numerous events and social gatherings around campus, with some sponsored by the college.

== Traditions ==
=== Toast throwing ===
As a sign of school pride, crowds of Quaker fans perform a unique ritual. After the third quarter of football games, spirited onlookers unite in the singing of "Drink a Highball," which refers to the University's unofficial cocktail, the Pennsylvanian, made with Calvados, a dash of Madeira Wine, an egg white, and a twist of lemon. In years long past, students would make a toast with the drink to the success of Penn's athletic teams. During Prohibition, stubborn students insisted on keeping their tradition - since they could not use alcohol, they had no choice but to literally "toast" Penn. As the last line, "Here's a toast to dear old Penn," is sung, the fans send toast hurling through the air onto the sidelines. In another version of the origins of toast throwing, in 1977, a student threw the first slice of toast after being inspired while attending a showing of The Rocky Horror Picture Show where members of the audience throw toast at the screen. In more recent years, some students have become more creative in their choice of projectiles, and it is not rare to see a hail of bagels or donuts, or even a loaf of French bread come flying down from the stands.

The sweeper is often called the "toast Zamboni".

=== Econ Scream ===
At midnight on the eve of the first Microeconomics 001 midterm exam, hundreds of students (predominantly freshmen) try to release stress by participating in a collective shout on the Junior Balcony of the Lower Quadrangle. Streakers often run around on the grassy area of the lower quad. This tradition has been upheld by the Freshman Class Board, a branch of Penn's student government, as their inaugural Board event every year.

=== Goal post tossing ===
In past years, the Penn Quakers have won the Ivy League championship, sending the jubilant fans into a frenzy. In celebration, the fans ripped down the goalposts and tossed them into the Schuylkill River. This tradition has most likely ended, as the last attempt to tear down the goalposts failed in 2003 as a result of a concrete footing that made efforts to topple them futile. In 2009, students did not attempt to tear down the goalposts, as Penn police officers had made a blockade around them using their bicycles.

=== Hey Day ===
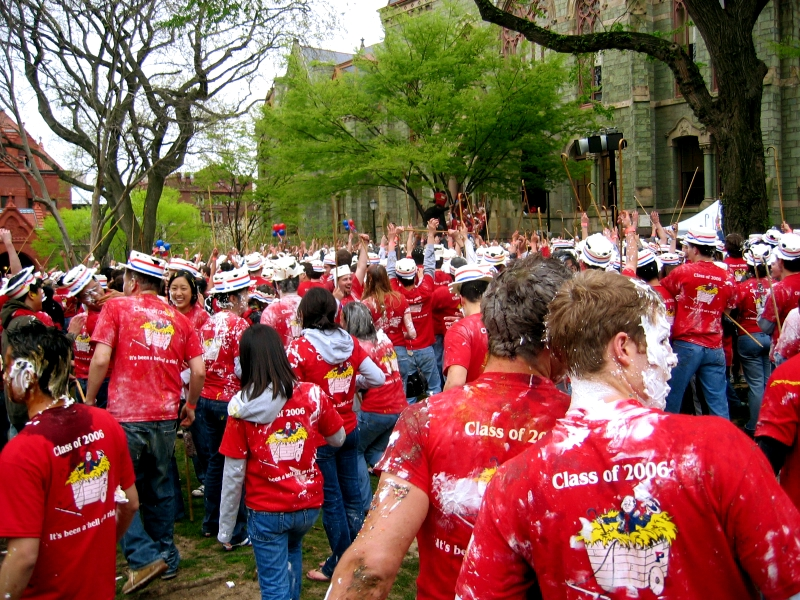
A scene from the finale of Hey Day for Class of 2006

In April, several class traditions are celebrated. Class Day, which began in 1865 to supplement the final graduation exercises, celebrates the progression of all classes and the departure of the seniors. In 1916, this day merged with Straw Hat Day and became the "day of two events." In 1931, Hey Day arose from these two celebrations. On this day, the juniors gather on High Rise Field for a picnic, don straw "skimmers" and canes, and march triumphantly down Locust Walk to College Hall.

The procession tradition began in 1949. More recently, the straw skimmers have changed to Styrofoam hats, and classmates take bites out of one another's hats. When the procession reaches College Hall, the students make an arch with their canes to greet the President of the University. The outgoing and incoming senior class presidents then give speeches, and the juniors are "officially" declared seniors. In May 2015, the university commemorated the celebration of the 100th Hey Day.

=== Ivy Day ===
One plants ivy by a building, and an "Ivy Stone" is placed on the building to commemorate the occasion. In 1981, the day was officially moved to the Saturday before Commencement. Also on this day, the Spoon, Bowl, Cane, and Spade awards, honoring four graduating men, and the Hottel, Harnwell, Goddard, and Brownlee awards, honoring four graduating women, are presented. During the celebration, a noted individual who is chosen by the class gives an address. Recent Ivy Day addresses have been presented by Penn Parent Joan Rivers, former Philadelphia Mayor and Governor of Pennsylvania (and also a Penn alumnus) Ed Rendell, and basketball player Julius Erving.

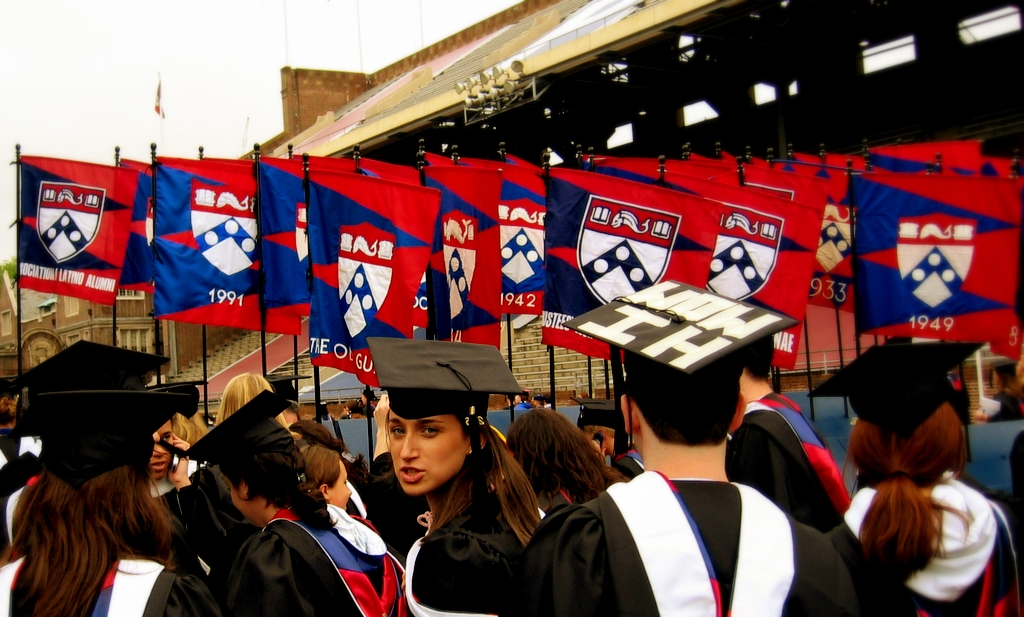
Penn's 250th Commencement.

The building receiving the Ivy Stone is very often a building of some significance to the graduating class. For example, in 1983, a stone was placed near the field in Franklin Field celebrating Penn's first Ivy League championship in football since 1959, the previous fall—at the yard line from which the game-winning field goal against Harvard was kicked, clinching at least a share of the championship.

=== The Red and Blue ===
Penn students have a school anthem,The Red and Blue. This is not to be confused with the official alma mater of the university, Hail, Pennsylvania!.

=== Spring Fling ===
Spring Fling is an annual festival for the students at the end of each Spring semester, usually beginning on the Friday of the second-to-last week of the semester and continuing until Saturday night. Fling, which began in 1973, is dubbed the largest college party on the East Coast, and is hosted by the university's Social Planning and Events Committee. The event takes place on College Green, Penn Commons, and The Quadrangle (or Quad) for a student body drenched in alcohol, for the most part. Over the past few years, there has been legitimate discussion towards potentially moving the event out of the Quad, but improved behavior has resulted in the carnival aspect of the festival remaining in the Quad. College Green becomes a staging area for carnival games and carnival food. Two stages in the Quad host Penn's performing arts groups. Saturday night, Penn holds a festival on College Green, and Friday night SPEC (The Social Planning and Events Committee SPEC – Bringing events to Penn since 1989) brings in a headlining musical act for a concert. Past guests for this concert have included Wyclef Jean, Busta Rhymes, Sonic Youth, and Of A Revolution.

=== Rowbottoms ===
"Hey—Rowbottom!" or "Yea Rowbottom!" was a common cry on the West Philadelphia campus from about 1910 until the 1970s. Once a "Rowbottom" got underway, automobiles might be overturned, windows smashed, and trolley tracks doused with gasoline and set ablaze. In the 1940s, "panty raids" of the women's dormitories became a prominent feature. Rowbottoms were most frequent in the fall, particularly after football games.

== Clubs and student groups ==
=== Fraternities and sororities ===
Penn has a substantial fraternity and sorority presence on campus.

==== Interfraternity Council ====
- Alpha Chi Rho
- Alpha Epsilon Pi
- Alpha Sigma Phi
- Alpha Tau Omega
- Beta Theta Pi
- Delta Kappa Epsilon
- Delta Phi (St. Elmo)
- Delta Psi (St. Anthony Hall)
- Delta Tau Delta
- Delta Upsilon
- Kappa Alpha Society
- Kappa Sigma
- Lambda Chi Alpha
- Phi Delta Theta
- Phi Gamma Delta (Fiji)
- Phi Kappa Psi
- Phi Sigma Kappa
- Pi Kappa Alpha
- Pi Kappa Phi
- Pi Lambda Phi
- Psi Upsilon
- Sigma Alpha Epsilon
- Sigma Alpha Mu
- Sigma Chi
- Sigma Nu
- Sigma Phi Epsilon
- Sigma Pi
- Tau Epsilon Phi
- Theta Tau
- Theta Xi
- Zeta Beta Tau
- Zeta Psi

==== Panhellenic Council ====
- Alpha Delta Pi
- Alpha Phi
- Chi Omega
- Delta Delta Delta
- Kappa Alpha Theta
- Sigma Delta Tau
- Sigma Kappa
- Zeta Tau Alpha

==== Multicultural Greek Council ====
- Alpha Kappa Alpha
- alpha Kappa Delta Phi
- Alpha Phi Alpha
- Delta Sigma Theta
- Lambda Phi Epsilon
- Lambda Theta Alpha
- Lambda Upsilon Lambda
- Kappa Alpha Psi
- Omega Psi Phi
- Sigma Beta Rho
- Sigma Lambda Upsilon
- Sigma Psi Zeta
- Zeta Phi Beta

=== Senior societies ===
Penn has senior societies, though participation is smaller than in Greek life.

=== Performing arts ===
Platt Student Performing Arts House is the home base for performing arts at Penn. The university has more than 45 different student-run performing arts organizations, including the African American Arts Alliance, Bloomers, the Mask and Wig Club, Penn Singers Light Opera Company, Pennsylvania Players, Simply Chaos, Stimulus Children's Theatre Company.

Musical groups include Penn’s Chamber Orchestra, Penn Jazz Ensemble, the Penn Symphony Orchestra, and The University of Pennsylvania Band, one of the oldest scramble bands in the country. Singing groups include the Counterparts, a jazz a cappella group; the traditional PennSix; Penn Masala— a Hindi group; Penn Shabbatones, a Jewish group; PennYo, a co-ed Chinese group; Penn Atma, an all-female South-Asian fusion group; the University of Pennsylvania Glee Club, and the Penn Sirens, an all-female vocal ensemble.

Penn also a dance community including groups like African Rhythms, Onda Latina, Pan-Asian Dance Troupe, Penn Ballet, Penn Chinese Dance Club, Penn Dance Company, Penn Dhamaka, Penn Latin Ballroom Dance, Penn Raas, Penn Thillana, Penn Yalla, Soundworks Tap Factory, Sparks Dance Company, Strictly Funk Dance Company, and WAVe (West African Vibe).

==== Penn Singers ====
The 'Penn Singers is a light opera company at the University of Pennsylvania. The group was founded in 1957 as the University's first all-female choir and was converted into a co-ed light opera company in 1972. The group performs two major productions each year - a Broadway-style musical or revue in the fall, and a Gilbert and Sullivan operetta or a show in the spring.

==== Pennsylvania Players ====
Founded in 1936, the Pennsylvania Players was the first student theatre group at the University of Pennsylvania. With the guidance of professional directors, Penn Players produces two major shows each year, a musical in the fall and a straight play in the spring, in the Harold Prince Theater of the Annenberg Center.

=== Literature and journalism ===
Following are some of the student-run publications at the University of Pennsylvania.

- 34th Street Magazine – weekly arts and culture magazine
- The Daily Pennsylvanian – Penn's independent, student-run newspaper; published since 1885; regularly wins Pacemaker and CSPA Gold Circle awards
- The F-Word – feminist literary magazine
- International Business Review – undergraduate publication from the Wharton School
- Penn Appetit – food magazine
- Penn Asian Review – forum for an intellectual discussion of the Asian Pacific region
- Penn Bioethics Journal – peer reviewed undergraduate publication
- Penn History Review – undergraduate history journal
- Penn Political Review – Penn's primary outlet for student sociopolitical thought
- Penn Review – mainstream literary and arts magazine
- Penn Undergraduate Law Journal – student-run undergraduate law journal
- PennScience Journal of Undergraduate Research – undergraduate science research journal
- Pennsylvania Punch Bowl – Penn's humor magazine, founded in 1889; one of the nation's oldest and most acclaimed humor magazines
- The Pennsylvania Triangle – science and technology magazine founded in 1899; oldest of Penn's student-run journals; a student-run SEAS publication
- Philomel – arts journal, founded in 1981
- PJPPE: The Penn Journal of Philosophy, Politics & Economics – online journal, previously a print publication called SPICE
- Symbiosis – visual and literary arts
- Synapse – multidisciplinary healthcare publication
- Under The Button – online blog for student news, gossip and entertainment
- The WALK – fashion magazine

== Religious life ==
Penn has no central area for religious worship. Until the 2010-2011 school year, Penn did not provide direct funding for religious student groups. Due to a large demand for religious groups an $8,000 "Faith Fund" was created for distribution by the Office of the Chaplain. The office hosts three staff members including the University Chaplain and Associate Chaplain, in addition to an Interfaith Fellow. Penn recognizes more than 40 religiously affiliated student groups and another 40 campus ministries and local congregations connected to campus life, although without monetary support. PRISM (Programs in Religious, Interfaith, and Spirituality Matters) serves as the representative of all undergraduate faith organizations to the university and facilitates interfaith dialogue, cooperation, and events.

The Penn Catholic Newman Center is the oldest Newman campus ministry in the country, dating back to 1893, and owns its own complex one block from campus. Penn Hillel's Steinhardt Hall is the largest Hillel International building of any college or university in the country. Large campus religious groups include Adventist Students for Christ, Alma Latina, Asian Baptist Student Koinonia, Chi Alpha Penn, The Christian Association, The Collegium Institute for Catholic Thought & Culture, Doxa Campus Ministry, Episcopal Campus Ministry at Penn, Every Nation Campus, Fellowship of Christian Athletes in Action, Global Connect Philly, Grace Covenant Church, The Graduate Christian Reading Group, Hindu Jain Association, International Students Inc. (ISI), Jewish Graduate Student Network, Jewish Heritage Programs, Korean Christian Fellowship, Latter Day Saints Student Association, Lubavitch House at Penn (Chabad), Lutheran Campus Ministry, Medina at Penn, My Brother’s Keeper (MBK), Muslim Life Program, Muslim Students Association, Orthodox Christian Fellowship (OCF), Orthodox Community at Penn_{,} Penn Baha’i Club, Penn Chavurah, Penn Graduate Christian Fellowship, Penn Meditation and Buddhism Club, Penn Students for Christ, Queer Christian Fellowship, Reform Jewish Community, Renewal College Fellowship, Resurrection CCO, SGI Buddhist Club at Penn, Shira Chadasha, and Sikh Organization of Penn.
