= Haidai (surname) =

Haidai or Gaidai (Ukrainian: Гайдай), also transliterated Hayday and Gayday, is a surname. Notable people with the surname include:

- Leonid Gaidai (1923–1993), Soviet film director
- Serhiy Haidai (born 1975), Ukrainian politician
- Zoia Gaidai (1902–1965), Ukrainian opera singer
