= Harvard International =

Harvard International may refer to:

- Harvard International (distributor), a UK-based distributor of consumer electronics
- Harvard International Relations Council, a non-profit organization that seeks to promote awareness of international relations
- Harvard International Law Journal, a biannual academic journal of international law
- Harvard International Review, a quarterly international relations journal
