= Renaud Dehousse =

French jurist (born 1960)

9th President of the European University Institute
- In office 1 September 2016 – 2024
- Preceded by: Joseph H. H. Weiler

Personal details
- Born: 2 June 1960 (age 66) Liège, Belgium
- Parent(s): Agnes Denis (mother); Jean-Maurice Dehousse (father)
- Occupation: Lawyer, educator

Academic background
- Education: University of Liege, European University Institute (Doctor of Law)
- Thesis: Fédéralisme et relations internationales: une réflexion comparative (1988)
- Doctoral advisor: Yves Mény

Academic work
- Discipline: International Law; European Union Law
- Institutions: European University Institute
- Notable works: The European Court of Justice: The Politics of Judicial Integration (1998)

Renaud Dehousse (born on the 2 June 1960) is a Belgian lawyer and professor. He is currently the Rector of Johns Hopkins University SAIS Europe (in Bologna) and Vice Dean of SAIS, a role he assumed in January 2024 following the completion of his term as President of the European University Institute (EUI) in Florence, Italy.

== Biography ==
Renaud Dehousse was born in Liège in 1960, the second son of Agnes Denis and Jean-Maurice Dehousse. He became a student of law at the University of Liège (Belgium) and then obtained a doctorate from the European University Institute in Florence. He later took up various positions at the EUI, including professor and head of the Department of Law, before being appointed ordinary professor at the University of Pisa.

In 1999, Dehousse joined Sciences Po. There, he held the Jean Monnet Chair of European Law and Political Science at Sciences Po, Paris and also directed the Centre for European Studies. He was a scientific advisor to the centre for study and research founded by Jacques Delors, Notre Europe. He was also a visiting professor at the University of Michigan, the University of Lausanne and the University of Florence.

Dehousse was President of the European University Institute (EUI) in Florence, Italy, from September 2016 through 2023. Dehousse follows Joseph H. H. Weiler in a role which has also been held by Marise Cremona, Josep Borrell Fontelles, Yves Mény, Patrick Masterson, Émile Noël, Werner Maihofer and Max Kohnstamm. In 2024 Dehousse took on the position as the inaugural Rector of Johns Hopkins SAIS Europe and Vice Dean of SAIS. https://sais.jhu.edu/users/rdehous1

== Research ==
Dehousse's research interests revolve around comparative federalism and the institutional evolution of the European Union. During the 1990s, his research focussed on topics such as federalism and international relations, the eastern expansion of Europe and the results of the Maastricht Treaty. Whilst at Notre Europe, Dehousse worked on a critical evaluation of the Lisbon Strategy.

More recently, his research has come to focus on the transformation of governance at European level, particularly at the level of bureaucratic structures and the role of the Court of Justice in the European political system. He has published on topics relating to the European Union, European Commission, crisis, and hard and soft power in European governance. His recent publications include The European Commission of the Twenty-First Century (Oxford: Oxford University Press, 2013) and Delegation of Powers in the European Union: The need for a multi-principals model (West European Politics, 2008).

His academic research has been widely published in international academic journals including the Journal of Common Market Studies, American Journal of Comparative Law, West European Politics, European Journal of International Law and European Union Politics.

Dehousse has spoken publicly about the future of Europe with regard to issues such as populism, trade, European culture, intellectual pluralism, the future of Europe after Brexit, and the 60th anniversary of the Treaty of Rome.
