= WEMUN Expo =

WE Model United Nations Expo
- Abbreviation: WEMUN Expo
- Formation: 2007
- Type: Profit
- Purpose: Education
- Headquarters: Beijing, China
- Location: Beijing, China
- Members: 1500
- Official language: English, Chinese
- Website: https://welandedu.com.cn/wemun-expo-2025/

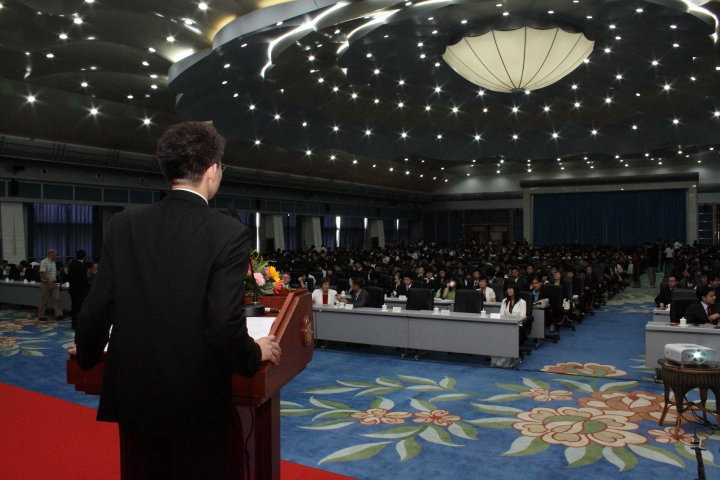
WEMUN Expo in action.

WE Model United Nations Expo (WEMUN Expo) was established in 2007 and was one of the first high-school Model United Nations conferences in China. It has become international with delegates from around 30 different countries and with over 1500 delegates, and has now grown to become the largest Model UN conference in Asia. The conference takes place at the Grand Epoch City Hotel in the outskirts of Beijing annually at the beginning of August. The conference is unique as being the first MUN to unite twelve notable high-school and university level conferences, which are the following:

- WEMUNC
- Boston University's BeanMUN
- The Ivy League Model UN Conference (ILMUNC)
- Model UN of University of Chicago (MUNUC)
- Berkeley Model UN (BMUN)
- North American Invitational Model United Nations (NAIMUN)
- The Hague International Model UN (THIMUN)
- The European International Model United Nations (TEIMUN)
- Cornell Model UN Conference (CMUNC)
- Yale MUN (YMUN)
- Secondary Schools' United Nations Symposium (SSUNS)
- Oxford Global MUN

== Harvard Model United Nations China ==
WEMUN Expo has, since March 2010, collaborated with the Harvard International Relations Council to bring a chapter of the Harvard World Model United Nations to China. The 2010 conference was held in Beijing and hosted 1000 delegates and 13 committees, and the 2011 conference was held in Shanghai.

== See also ==
- Model United Nations
- Harvard International Relations Council
- List of model United Nations conferences
