= Manny Perez =

Manny Perez may refer to:

- Manny Pérez (born 1969), Dominican American actor
- Manny Perez (soccer) (born 1999), American soccer player
- Manuel Perez (animator) (1914–1981), American animator

== See also ==
- Manuel Perez (disambiguation)
