= European University Institute =

Teaching and research institute

Coordinates: 43°48′10″N 11°16′58″E

European University Institute (EUI)
- Type: Intergovernmental organisation
- Established: 1972
- Budget: €93,700,000
- President: Patrizia Nanz
- Doctoral students: Annually 130 postgraduate researchers for four years
- Location: Via dei Roccettini, 9 - 50014, Fiesole, Tuscany, Italy
- Campus: San Domenico di Fiesole
- Website: www.eui.eu

The European University Institute (EUI) is an international postgraduate, post-doctoral University, and intergovernmental organisation located in Fiesole, Italy. Founded in 1972, The EUI is mainly funded by 24 EU member states and the European Union (Erasmus+).

The European University Institute is a member of the European University of Social Sciences, or CIVICA.

== History and member states ==
The European University Institute (EUI) was founded in 1972 by the member states of the European Community.

The EUI finds its origins in the advocacy for a European institute at the 1948 Hague Conference and the European Conference on Culture the following year in Lausanne. At the 1955 Messina Conference, when the members of the European Coal and Steel Community (ECSC) gathered to assess that organisation's progress, the German secretary of state, Walter Hallstein, called for the establishment of a training centre for nuclear sciences.

The idea remained largely dormant until 1969 when European leaders met in The Hague and resolved to fund a European University Institute (EUI) in Florence. By this point the idea had evolved from a centre for nuclear sciences to one focused on the human sciences, promoting a cultural exchange between member states.

Plans were put into motion with conferences in Florence and Rome in 1970 and 1971, when it was decided that the institute would be reserved for post-graduate studies and not directly a Community institution.

The six member states – Belgium, France, Germany, Italy, Luxembourg and the Netherlands – signed a convention in 1972 establishing the EUI as a pillar for research and development. The EUI Convention entered into force in 1975, and the institute opened its doors to its first 70 researchers in 1976. Its mission, laid down in the 1970s, is to "foster the advancement of learning in fields which are of particular interest for the development of Europe".

Denmark, Ireland and the United Kingdom joined the European Community in 1973, and subsequently acceded to the convention establishing the EUI. In 1992, a new convention revising the 1972 convention establishing the EUI was signed by the then 12 Community member states. It entered into force in 2007 when the last contracting state ratified the convention.

EUI contracting states must be European Union member states. As of June 2025, contracting states include all EU member states except Czech Republic, Hungary, and Lithuania.

== Academic departments ==
=== Departments ===
The EUI is made up of four research departments in humanities and social sciences:

- Department of History
- Department of Economics
- Department of Political and Social Sciences
- Department of Law

=== Florence School of Transnational Governance ===
The Florence School of Transnational Governance (STG) was launched in 2017. Located in Palazzo Buontalenti, in the heart of Florence, the STG serves as a hub for exchange and collaboration, bringing together academia, civil society, policymakers, the business sector, NGOs, the media and other stakeholders. Alexander Stubb sas the director of STG from May 2020 to February 2024 before leaving to become President of Finland.

=== Robert Schuman Centre ===
The Institute also includes a centre for advanced studies in public policy research, the Robert Schuman Center for Advanced Studies (RSCAS), named in honor of Robert Schuman.

== Historical Archives of the EU ==
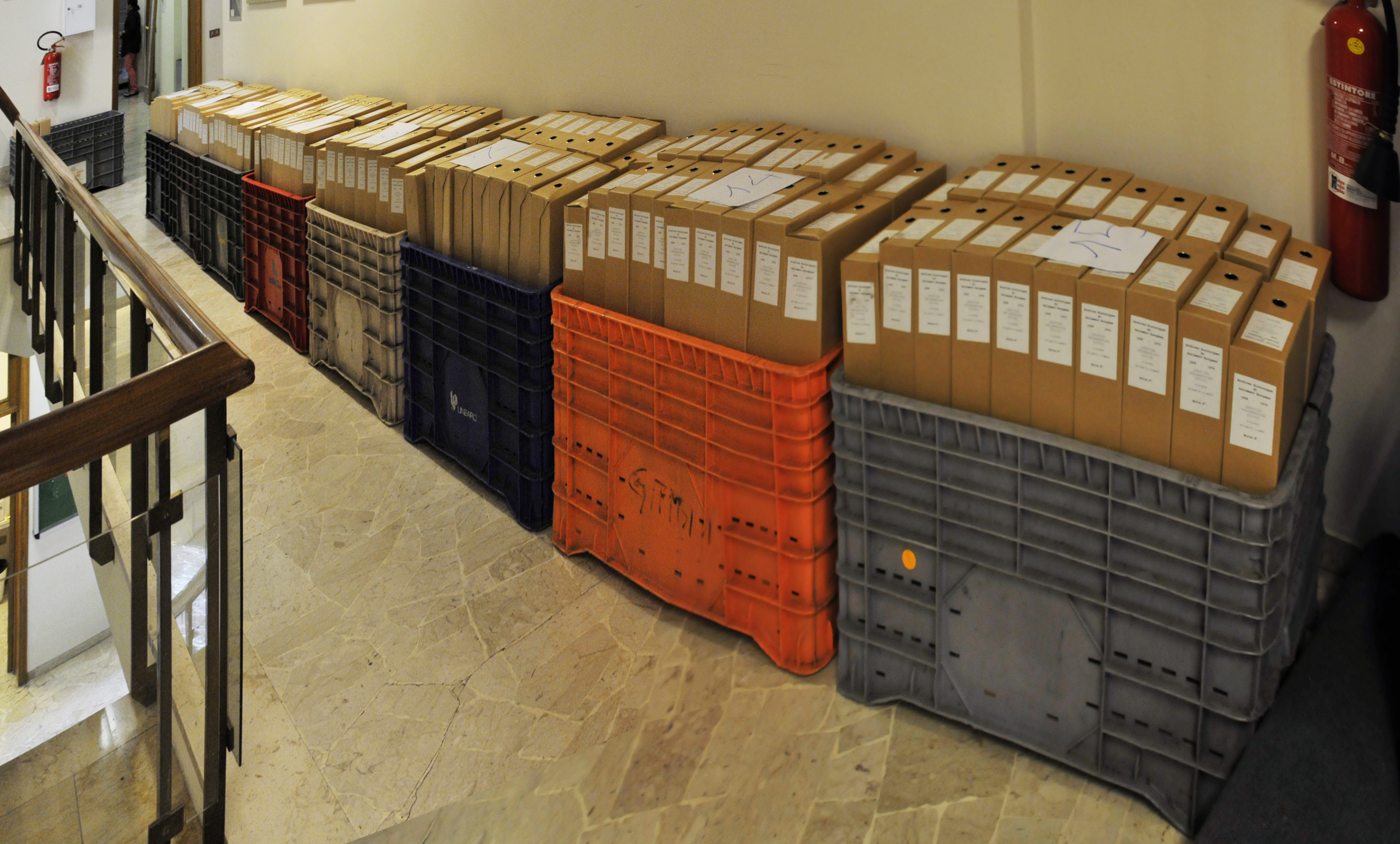
Fonds from the HAEU being moved.

The Historical Archives of the European Union (HAEU) was established following the 1983 decision of the European Coal and Steel Community (ECSC) and the 1983 regulation by the Council of the European Communities to open their historical archives to the public.

A 1984 agreement between the Commission of the European Communities and the European University Institute located the Archives in Florence, at the EUI, and in 1986 the HAEU opened its doors to the public. It is the single, official archival repository of the institutions, bodies, and agencies of the European Union, and also holds more than 160 private archives of European personalities, politicians, movements, and associations that played an important role in European integration. It has been in its current seat, in Villa Salviati, since 2012. Users may consult the Archives' online database for descriptions of the documents, audiovisual materials, and artefacts in its deposits. Archival materials may be consulted in the HAEU reading room according to the thirty-years rule, or online where possible. The HAEU supports research on European integration through the administration of several grant programmes.

== Doctoral programme ==
The EUI offers structured doctoral programmes in the field of economics, history and civilisation, law, and political and social sciences.

== Languages ==
The EUI's Centre for Academic Literacies and Languages (CALL) provides language training in oral and written academic communication skills and facilitates social interaction in academic environments.

== Major events ==
=== The State of the Union ===
The State of the Union is an annual forum for high level reflection on the European Union organised by the EUI since 2011. The conference acts as a bridge between academia and policy making at the highest level in Europe, bringing together heads of state, EU representatives, academics, policy-makers, business and opinion leaders and civil society representatives to discuss and debate the key challenges and opportunities facing Europe and Europeans each year. Presidents, prime ministers, foreign ministers, as well as presidents of the European Commission and European Parliament have taken part in the event over the years.

== Rankings ==
In 2024, the EUI was ranked 6th in the world in political science and among the first 100 in sociology, public administration, and economics on the Shanghai Ranking. It was also ranked 31st in the world for Politics and International Studies, 51st in the world for History, and 89th in the world for Law in the QS World University Rankings.

The EUI Political and Social Science department was ranked 1st in Europe and 5th worldwide in the Hix ranking of such departments (which was published in 2004 and covered the period 1998–2002). In November 2009, the same department was included in the Die Zeit 'CHE Excellence Ranking' for political science.

== Campus ==
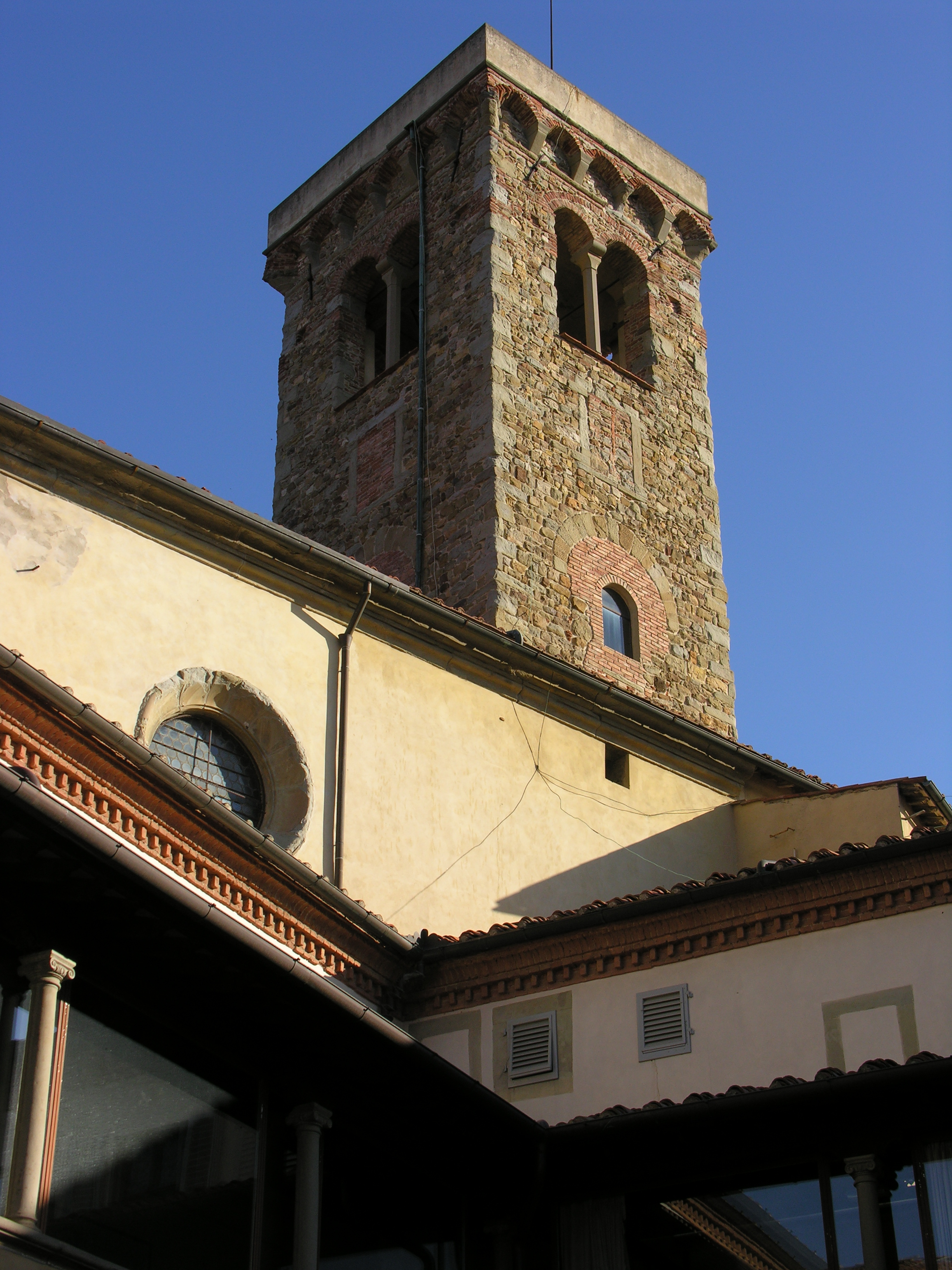
Badia Bell Tower

The European University Institute is seated in Fiesole on the Tuscan hillside overlooking Florence. The headquarters are at the Badia Fiesolana.

The campus is spread across 12 villas in the area, many of which date back to the Renaissance period and have been restored along with their landscaped gardens. The EUI campus also includes Palazzo Buontalenti in the historic centre of Florence at the Casino Mediceo di San Marco, which has been home to the STG since 2021.

== Organisation ==
The main governance bodies are the High Council (composed of the Member State delegates) and the Academic Council. The President of the Institute is Professor Patrizia Nanz, who is assisted in her duties by the Institute's Secretary General, Armando Barucco, and the Chief Operating Officer, Roberto Nocentini.

== Institutional and research publications ==
Corporate publications produced by the EUI include:

- EUI Activity Report
- Annual Directory of EUI Academic Publications

The EUI Research Repository contains the academic publications by the members of the EUI, with open-access, full text-versions of publications (working papers, books, contributions to books, e-Books, articles, and theses).

== Former presidents ==
- Max Kohnstamm, Netherlands
- Werner Maihofer, Germany
- Émile Noël, France
- Patrick Masterson, Ireland
- Yves Mény, France
- Josep Borrell Fontelles, Spain
- Marise Cremona, United Kingdom
- Joseph Weiler, United States
- Renaud Dehousse, Belgium

== Notable former faculty ==
- Philip Alston, Law
- Giuliano Amato, Law
- Richard Bellamy, Max Weber Programme
- Jean Blondel, Political science
- Gisela Bock, History
- Kirti N. Chaudhuri, History
- Carlo Cipolla, History
- Colin Crouch, Sociology
- Maurice Cranston, Political philosophy
- Donatella della Porta, Sociology
- Gøsta Esping-Andersen, Sociology
- Sergio Fabbrini, Political science
- Peter Flora, Sociology
- Klaus Hopt, Law
- Søren Johansen, Economics
- Steven Lukes, Political philosophy
- Peter Mair, Political science
- Giandomenico Majone, Political science
- Alan S. Milward, History
- Michael Keating, Political science
- Thomas Risse, International Relations
- Giovanni Sartori, Political science
- Philippe C. Schmitter, Political science
- Andrew Shonfield, Economics
- Susan Strange, Political economy
- Gunther Teubner, Law
- Neil Walker, Law
- Joseph Weiler, Law
- Jay Winter, History
- Christian Reus-Smit, International Relations

== Notable alumni ==
- Manuel Perez-Garcia, Spanish Associate Professor at Shanghai Jiao Tong University (China) and ERC Grantee 2015
- Catherine Barnard, British legal scholar
- Richard Bellamy, British Political Theorist at UCL
- Srđan Cvijić, Serbian political scientist
- Maurice Glasman, British political scientist
- Simon Hix, British political scientist at the London School of Economics
- Jonathan Hopkin, British political scientist
- John Loughlin, Professor at the University of Cambridge
- Peter Mair, Professor of Political Science at Leiden University and the EUI
- Frank Schimmelfennig, Swiss political scientist
- Nuno Severiano Teixeira, Portuguese scholar, Minister of Defense
- Joachim Wuermeling, German politician
- Martin Westlake, British, Secretary-General of the European Economic and Social Committee
- Mishal Husain, British, BBC World
- Marta Cartabia, Italian, Former President of the Italian Constitutional Court
- Marco Doria, Italian, Mayor of the city of Genoa
- Brigitte Granville, French, Professor at Queen Mary University of London
- Tiago C. Peixoto, Brazilian political scientist at the World Bank.
- Dame Cindy Kiro, Governor-General of New Zealand
