= Model United Nations in the United States =

American extracurricular activity

Model United Nations is a popular extracurricular activity for middle school, high school, and college students in the United States. The U.S. was where Model UN originated and was popularized. The U.S. has several regional centers of Model UN, each with its own distinct style.

Traditionally, Model UN has been associated with affluent schools and communities, but in recent years, the activity has expanded to reach more students.

== Model UN by Region ==
Model United Nations is popular across the United States, with MUN clubs and conferences being found in every region. However, because Model UN is decentralized and has grown autonomously, there are significant differences in how MUN is done between regions.

=== East Coast ===
Centered on the New York and Washington metropolitan areas, both of which play host to a multitude of prestigious, largely university-hosted conferences, including those of Georgetown University through the Georgetown International Relations Association (NCSC and NAIMUN) and George Washington University (GWCIA). Other notable conferences in the region include ILMUNC, hosted by the University of Pennsylvania, YMUN, hosted by Yale; HMUN, hosted by Harvard; JHUMUNC at Johns Hopkins University in Baltimore; UMUNC at The University of Maryland; and a number of conferences hosted in New York City with ceremonies held at the United Nations General Assembly. These conference include WIMUN, hosted by the World Federation of United Nations Associations; NHSMUN, the National High School Model United Nations Conference, hosted by the International Model United Nations Association; NMUN, the premier national conference for university students; and FWWMUN, hosted by the World Council for Youth and Diplomacy.

=== West Coast ===
The West Coast is known for its Model United Nations programs. Naturally stressing the academic side of Model UN, conferences greatly value well-written position papers, not just factoring them into awards decisions, but also giving dedicated awards for them. West Coast conferences are run by universities, high schools, and interscholastic organizations. BruinMUN (held by UCLA), SMUNC (Stanford MUN Conference), BMUN (Berkeley MUN), McKennaMUN, and SCMUN are popular college conferences for high school delegates. For example, SCMUN (hosted by the University of Southern California), offers advanced debate for high school delegates who are hoping to glean substantive and academic value from Model United Nations conferences.

Additionally, high school-run conferences on the West Coast have surged in popularity over recent years. For instance, The Nueva School's NMUNC—initially known for its inaugural, Mars themed, seven-way, joint crisis committee conference—has gained recognition for its expansive crisis backrooms and its employment of theatre groups for crisis updates. Other well-known programs include Long Beach Poly's JackrabbitMUN, known for its well-run crisis committees, Santa Teresa High School's SCVMUN, one of the oldest MUN conferences on the west coast at 50 years of conferences held at the school, Huntington Beach High School's Surf City and Novice Conferences, Cerritos High School's CHSMUN, Edison High School's EHSMUN, and Mira Costa's LAIMUN are all nationally recognized conferences.

In Washington State, most Model UN activities, conferences, and clubs are situated within the Washington Eastside. Four of the largest and most active annual conferences in the region, PACMUN (Pacific MUN), EDUMUN (Educational MUN), KINGMUN (King County MUN), and SeattleMUN, are overseen and managed by Model United Nations Northwest, a 501(c)(3) nonprofit. The area is dotted with independently-run conferences, such as WOWMUN and WASMUN.

=== Midwest ===
Despite the fact that the Midwest has fewer conferences than the more established East and West Coast circuits, it still has a very developed and distinct Model UN culture that is dominated by small regional conferences (such as Midwest Model UN (MMUN), Model UN at the University of Illinois (MUNI), and large international-level conferences centered around Chicago). While some major conferences are located in Michigan and Missouri, most are located in Illinois, specifically in Chicago.

Chicago is a major hub of the Model UN community at large, but maintains a strong sense of independence, and is known to have a characteristic focus on realism and innovative crisis simulations. MUN is mostly seen as an educational political exercise, where the students understanding of the world and power is emphasized, and where awards and resolution writing tend to be de-emphasized. As a result, the Midwest's crisis conferences are well-regarded, with ChoMUN and CIMUN being particularly well known for this style.

Model United Nations of the University of Chicago (MUNUC) is the largest conference in the Midwest, hosting several thousand delegates participating in 33 different committees during its 33rd session in 2021. The Model United Nations Development Organization (MUNDO) runs the Chicago International Model United Nations (CIMUN), which hosted 1300 high school delegates participating in 24 committees during its 11th annual conference in 2014. CIMUN is among the fastest growing Model UN high school conferences in the US, featuring positively review simulations .

The Chicago Model United Nations (ChoMUN), also organized by the University of Chicago, is a prestigious college-level Model UN conference in the region, being well known for its unique simulations, and is known to be one of the best college-level crisis conferences in the US. The American Model United Nations (AMUN), an independent organization, is the largest college-level conference in the Midwest and featured 15 committees. In 2014, AMUN welcomed 1400 delegates from around the US and the globe, and also celebrated its 25th anniversary.

In recent years, more Midwestern teams have also traveled to conferences on the East Coast, raising their profile nationally. High schools, such as Carl Sandburg High School, Adlai E. Stevenson High School, the University of Chicago Laboratory Schools, St. Ignatius College Prep, and Glenbrook South High School, have performed well at large East Coast conferences and have become particularly well-known. University teams have also been successful, such as UChicago's team which in both 2013 and 2014 was ranked the best college Model UN team in North America, the first team to twice achieve this feat. Other teams like Alma College, the University of Wisconsin-Madison, and University of Illinois - Chicago have made a name for themselves at larger conferences like Future We Want Model UN (FWWMUN), National Model UN (NMUN), American Model UN (AMUN), and at regional conferences like Midwest Model UN (MMUN).

In addition to the city of Chicago, several Minnesota teams have become major players in conferences around the country. In the 2010–2011 season, Cambridge-Isanti finished the year ranked 14th in the best delegate national rankings after finishing the equivalent of second at MUNUC and winning awards at UMMUC. Edina High School hosts the only student-run conference in Minnesota, often attracting up to four hundred high school delegates from over twelve metropolitan schools. Edina High School and Cambridge-Isanti High School are still ranked in the top 150 high school programs in the country by Best Delegate. Other notable Minnesota teams include Minnetonka High School and the Blake School.

=== South ===
Middle school, high school, and collegiate Model UN are all fairly popular in the Southern United States. Model UN in the American South can be divided into three sub-regions: Texas, the Southeast (most notably, Florida), and the Southwest. Texas and the Southeast have robust teams and conference circuits, with Houston notably having its largest high school conference running for over 45 years. The Southwest is still in the early stages of establishing its Model UN circuit, with only one team—Mountain View High School—earning a spot on the 2018 Best Delegate Top 150 Best High School Teams rankings.

Texas is a uniquely-active state for Model UN. Due to the state's size and the majority of teams hailing from public schools, Model UN is almost always conducted "in-state" due to cost concerns and familiarity of procedure. This is in contrast to teams in the East Coast/Mid-Atlantic region, where a larger number of private schools, universities, and conferences allow Model UN to operate on a more multi-state basis. Despite this, Texas enjoys significant Model UN activity, with major conferences regularly hitting 2,000+ attendees. Some of its largest conferences include: Central Texas Model United Nations (CTMUN) hosted by the University of Texas at Austin, Houston Area Model United Nations (HAMUN) hosted by the University of Houston and assisted by other Texas colleges, the Student International Conference Model United Nations (SICMUN) hosted by Southwestern University and Meridian World School and organized by Delegates Beyond Borders (DBB), and Model United Nations San Antonio (MUNSA). Notable high school programs from Texas include: The Village School, William P. Clements High School, Westlake High School, the Liberal Arts and Sciences Academy, Lake Travis High School, Obra D. Tompkins High School, Plano West Senior High School, Southlake Carroll Senior High School, and The Colony High School (TCCMUN).

=== Puerto Rico ===
In Puerto Rico, students are bilingual and speeches in the committee are therefore allowed to be made in either English or Spanish.

Chairs in Puerto Rico adopt a more activist approach, directing the flow of debate and banging their gavels often. This is in comparison to the facilitator style of chairing more common in the rest of the United States which allows delegates to direct more of the flow of debate.

== See also ==
- Boys State
- Model Congress
- Model United Nations
- Model United States Senate
- MSC Student Conference on National Affairs at Texas A&M University
- United Nations
