= United Netherlands =

United Netherlands may refer to:

== In history ==
- Seventeen Provinces (1482–1581), a precursor state to the three modern states of the Netherlands, Belgium and Luxembourg
- Republic of the Seven United Netherlands or Dutch Republic, (1581–1795), a precursor state of the Netherlands
- Sovereign Principality of the United Netherlands (1813–1815), a precursor state of the United Kingdom of the Netherlands (its territory corresponded roughly to that of the Netherlands)
- United Kingdom of the Netherlands (1815–1839), a precursor state of the Netherlands, Belgium, and Luxembourg

== Other uses ==
- United Netherlands (organization), a Dutch student organization
