= International Institute in Geneva =

Private business school in Switzerland

Location
- Geneva; Switzerland; 46.219°N 6.143°E

Information
- Former name: International University in Geneva
- Type: Private
- Established: 1997; 29 years ago, bankrupt 2026
- President: Francis Kahn
- Dean: Dr. Surabhi Aggarwal
- Director: Eric Willumsen
- Faculty: 41
- Enrollment: 270
- Campus: Urban
- Nickname: IIG
- Website: www.iig.ch

The International Institute in Geneva (IIG), formerly known as International University in Geneva (IUN or IUG), founded in 1997, was a private business school in Geneva, Switzerland. The business school was located in the International Centre Cointrin, next to Geneva Airport.

== History ==
IIG has 270 students.

== Academic programs ==
The International Institute in Geneva offers undergraduate and graduate programs in several disciplines, including international relations, media and communications, computer science, business administration, international management, and international trade & finance. The business school offers joint degrees at the bachelor and graduate levels with University of Plymouth, UK. Students may select a unique option: undertaking the IIG master in IR and extending their studies to include an individual research dissertation to gain the award of MA-IR at University of Plymouth (UK) without leaving Geneva. A partnership with Boston University, US, gives an opportunity to earn a double degree with the opportunity to study in Boston. A doctorate in Business Administration jointly offered with Plymouth University was also available.

== Accreditation ==
- ACBSP private (US) programmatic accreditation
- BAC private (UK) Independent Higher Education Institution (IHEI) accreditation

== People ==
The president was Eric Willumsen (founder and executive vice-president). The chancellor was Claude Martin, former Director General of World Wide Fund for Nature. Nigerian chief trade negotiator Chiedu Osakwe was an adjunct professor at the institution until 2017.

== Exchange programmes ==
IIG has educational affiliation agreements for study abroad in North and South America including Boston University, Tulane in New Orleans, IUP in Pennsylvania, MIIS in California, UConn in Connecticut, Champlain College in Vermont, Anahuac University in Mexico City, Universidad Externado de Colombia in Colombia and Universidad de San Ignacio de Loyola in Peru.

IIG has also affiliation agreements for study abroad in Asia with the Indian Institute of Foreign Trade, New Delhi, India.

== Extra-curricular activities ==
IIG has a Model UN team that participates in Harvard WorldMUN and United Ambassadors MUNC Geneva conferences organized annually.

IIG has a football team that practices regularly and plays matches with other university teams in Geneva.
