= Joseph H. H. Weiler =

South African-American academic (born 1951)

Joseph H. H. Weiler OMRI
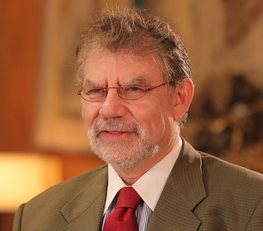
- Born: Joseph Halevi Horowitz Weiler; September 2, 1951 (age 75); Johannesburg, South Africa
- Title: University Professor, NYU School of Law
- Children: five
- Awards: Order of Merit of the Italian Republic Gran Croce; Ratzinger Prize Order of Merit, Republic of Hungary (pre-Orban); Commander's Cross of the Order of Merit of the Republic of Poland; Polish Council of Christians and Jews Man of Reconciliation; American Society of International Law's Manley O. Hudson Medal; Nicolaus Copernicus Fides et Ratio Award American Academy of Sciences & Letters' Barry Prize

Academic background
- Education: University of Sussex (BA); University of Cambridge (LLB; LLM); European University Institute (PhD)
- Thesis: Supranational law and the supranational system: Legal structure and political process in the European Community (1982)
- Doctoral advisor: Mauro Cappelletti

Academic work
- Discipline: International law, European Union law
- Institutions: European University Institute (1978–1985, 2013–2016); University of Michigan Law School (1985–1992); Harvard Law School (1992–2001); NYU School of Law (2001–2013, 2016–present)
- Doctoral students: Peter Van Den Bossche
- Notable works: The Constitution of Europe – do the New Clothes have an Emperor? (1998); The European Court of Justice (2001); Un'Europa Cristiana: Un saggio esplorativo (2003); The worlds of European constitutionalism (2011)
- Notable ideas: EU as a sui generis entity

8th President of the European University Institute
- In office 1 September 2013 – 31 August 2016
- Preceded by: Marise Cremona
- Succeeded by: Renaud Dehousse
- Website: NYU Law

Joseph Halevi Horowitz Weiler OMRI (born 2 September 1951) is an American academic, currently serving as European Union Jean Monnet Chair at New York University School of Law and Senior Fellow of the Minda de Gunzburg Center for European Studies, Harvard.

He was President of the European University Institute in Florence from 2013 until 2016. He holds a diploma from The Hague Academy of International Law. Weiler is the author of works relating to the sui generis character of the European Union. He is a Fellow of the American Academy of Arts and Sciences. In 2022 he was awarded the Ratzinger Prize by Pope Francis.

== Career ==
He holds degrees from Sussex (BA); Cambridge (LLB and LLM) and The Hague Academy of International Law (Diploma of International Law); he earned his PhD in European Law at the European University Institute (EUI), Florence, Italy.

From 1978 to 1985 he was professor of law and head of the Department of Law at the European University Institute, Florence, where in 1989 he was co-founder of its Academy of European Law. He later served as Professor of Law at the University of Michigan Law School (1985–1992) and as Manley Hudson Professor and Jean Monnet Chair at Harvard Law School (1992–2001). He then moved to New York University Law School. On 7 December 2012 the European University Institute's High Council approved his selection as the European University Institute's new President. He started his term on 1 September 2013 and served through 31 August 2016. He then returned to NYU.

He was Visiting Professor at, among others, University of Paris, Sciences Po, Hebrew University of Jerusalem, Max Planck Institute for Comparative Public Law and International Law, the College of Europe in Bruges and Natolin, All Souls College, Oxford, University of Chicago Law School, Stanford Law School, Yale Law School, UCLA School of Law, Ortega y Gasset Institute, Madrid, University of Toronto, University of Frankfurt, University of Ljubljana, Católica Global School of Law, and University of Łódź.

One of the topics of his specific interest is the influence of (Christian) church on European integration. He coined the term "Christophobia" in his book A Christian Europe: An Exploratory Essay:

It is a Europe that, while celebrating the noble heritage of Enlightenment humanism, also abandons its Christophobia and neither fears nor is embarrassed by the recognition that Christianity is one of the central elements in the evolution of its unique civilization. It is, finally, a Europe that, in public discourse about its own past and future, recovers all the riches that can come from confronting one of its two principal intellectual and spiritual traditions.

The term was then popularized by George Weigel's The Cube and the Cathedral.

Weiler contributes to the legal theory of European integration, he writes on many areas of EU law (internal market, external relations, social law, and above all, institutional law). He is a particular authority on the role of the European Court of Justice. He was the co-Editor-in-Chief of the European Journal of International Law (EJIL) until December 2024 and is the co-Editor-in-Chief of the International Journal of Constitutional Law (I•CON). He is currently a member of the Whitney R. Harris World Law Institute's International Council.

== Court cases ==
=== Calvo-Goller libel action ===
Weiler was a defendant in a criminal libel action brought in the French courts by Israeli scholar Dr Karin Calvo-Goller concerning a review of her book The Trial Proceedings of the International Criminal Court. ICTY and ICTR Precedents (Martinus Nijhoff, 2006) that appeared on the Global Law Books website which Weiler edits. The review was written by Professor Thomas Weigend of the University of Cologne. Calvo-Goller contended that it was libelous. Upon complaint by Calvo-Goller, Weiler declined to remove the review from the website and Calvo-Goller subsequently filed suit.

The suit was notable for the issues that it raised concerning the balance between academic freedom and the rights of those who consider themselves to have been libeled.

The Dean of the Investigating Judges of Paris accepted Calvo-Goller's complaint and the District Attorney decided to bring suit against Weiler. The case was heard by the Tribunal de Grand Instance de Paris on 20 January 2011, with the verdict handed down in Paris on 3 March 2011, dismissing the lawsuit. In its verdict, the Paris Tribunal said it had no jurisdiction in the case since Calvo-Goller did not bring proof by a court-appointed clerk that the book review website was visible in French territory the day or before the day she brought the case to the dean of the investigating judges in Paris. The Paris Tribunal also declared that the words used by Weigend did not constitute libel and were within the limits of free critical book review speech. The court said his words in the review were measured, and the court therefore dismissed the case. The court ordered Calvo-Goller to pay 8,000 euros (around US$10,000) in damages to Dr Weiler to cover his expenses. The case was described as an example of the Streisand effect, drawing more (negative) attention to Calvo-Goller and her book than the review would have received otherwise.

=== Lautsi v. Italy ===
In June 2010 Weiler intervened pro bono on behalf of eight governments before the Grand Chamber of the European Court of Human Rights in the case Lautsi v. Italy. He was defending Italy's right to require the crucifix to be displayed in public school classrooms. Reversing the unanimous (7:0) decision of the lower Chamber, the Grand Chamber ruled by a large majority (15:2) that the display of crucifixes in Italian classrooms does not contravene the European Convention of Human Rights.

In an interview Weiler stated that he was intervening on behalf of Italy not because he wanted to defend Christianity but to defend pluralism.

== Public lectures ==
In 2010, Weiler delivered the twenty-third Erasmus Lecture, titled The Trial of Jesus, organized by First Things magazine and the Institute on Religion and Public Life. In this lecture, Weiler examined the legal, historical, and theological dimensions of Jesus’ trial, exploring its implications for modern understandings of justice, law, and faith in the public sphere. His reflections drew from his expertise in constitutional and international law as well as his engagement with Jewish and Christian traditions.

== Accolades ==
- Weiler is the recipient of Doctorates Honoris Causa from London University University College London, University of Sussex, the University of Macerata, the University of Navarra, the University of Ljubljana, University of Edinburgh, CEU San Pablo University – Madrid, Humboldt University of Berlin, Roma Tre University, Democritus University of Thrace – Greece, University of Bucharest, the Catholic University of America, the National and Kapodistrian University of Athens, Strathmore University, Universidade Católica Portuguesa, University of Łódź, and West University of Timișoara
- He is the Director of the Jean Monnet Center for International and Regional Economic Law & Justice at NYU.
- He is also Co-Director of LL.M. "Law in a European and Global Context" at the Católica Global School of Law, Lisbon; Honorary Professor at University College, London; Honorary Professor at the Department of Political Science, University of Copenhagen, Co-Director of the Academy of International Trade Law in Macao, China and Honorary Professor at National University of Singapore.
- He is a Fellow of the American Academy of Arts and Sciences.
- He served as a Member of the Committee of Jurists of the Institutional Affairs Committee of the European Parliament co-drafting the European Parliament's Declaration of Human Rights and Freedoms.
- He was a member of the Groupe des Sages advising the Commission of the European Union on the 1996/97 Amsterdam Treaty.
- He is a WTO Panel Member.
- He is a founding Editor of the European Journal of International Law, of the European Law Journal and of the World Trade Review.
- He is a Member of the Advisory Boards or Scientific Committees of, among others, the Journal of Common Market Studies, Cahiers de Droit Européeen, Common Market Law Review, European Foreign Affairs Review, the Maastricht Journal of European and Comparative Law, Northern Ireland Legal Quarterly, the Columbia Journal of European Law, the Harvard International Review, the Harvard International Law Journal, the (Australian) Federal Law Review, the Journal of European Integration, the European Foreign Policy Bulletin online and ELSA-Selected Papers of European Law. He is a Member of the Board of Management of the European Research Paper Archive. He is also a Member of the Scientific Advisory Board of the Asia-Pacific Journal of EU Studies.
- He is a Council Member of the Centre for European Economic and Public Affairs, University College, Dublin, a Member of the Board of the Centre for the Law of the European Union at University College, London, Member of the International Advisory Board, Queen's University, Belfast, U.K. and at the Ortega y Gasset Institute, Madrid, Spain. He is a Member of the Advisory Council of the Interdisciplinary University Center, Herzelia, Israel. He is a Member of the Advisory Board of the Center for International, Comparative Law, the Dickinson School of Law, PennState and Member of the International Council of the Institute for Global Legal Studies, Washington University School of Law, St. Louis and a board member of the Scientific Advisory Board at the Max-Planck-Institute fuer auslaendisches oeffentliches Recht und Voelkerrecht in Heidelberg, Germany. He is a Member of the International Advisory Board of the Contemporary Europe Research Centre of the University of Melbourne, Australia and a Member of the International Board of the Concord Research Center at the College of Management, Israel. He is a Council Member of the Association for Hebraic Studies, AHS Institute, USA. He is a member of the Editorial Board of the Jewish Review of Books.

== Representative publications ==
- Un'Europa Cristiana: Un saggio esplorativo (BUR Saggi, Milano, 2003 – translations into Spanish, Polish, Portuguese, German, French, Hungarian, Dutch, Slovenian)
- European Constitutionalism Beyond the State. Edited with Marlene Wind (Cambridge University Press, 2003).
- Integration in an Expanding European Union: Reassessing the Fundamentals. Edited with Iain Begg and John Peterson (Blackwell Publishing, 2003).
- The Constitution of Europe – do the New Clothes have an Emperor? (Cambridge University Press, 1998 – translations into Spanish, Italian, German, Slovenian, Japanese, Chinese, Greek, Serbian, Portuguese and Arabic).
- The EU, the WTO, and the NAFTA: Towards a Common Law of International Trade? (Oxford University Press, 2000).
- The European Court of Justice. Edited with Gráinne de Búrca, (Oxford University Press, 2001) and a Novella, Der Fall Steinmann (Piper 2000).
- de Búrca, Gráinne; Weiler, J. H. H., eds. (2011). The worlds of European constitutionalism. Cambridge: Cambridge University Press. ISBN 978-0521177757.
