= Dehousse =

Dehousse is a surname. Notable people with the surname include:

- Fernand Dehousse (1906–1976), Belgian politician
- Jean-Maurice Dehousse (born 1936), former Member of the European Parliament and first Minister-President of the Walloon Region
- Renaud Dehousse, Belgian lawyer and professor
