= MUN Society Belgium =

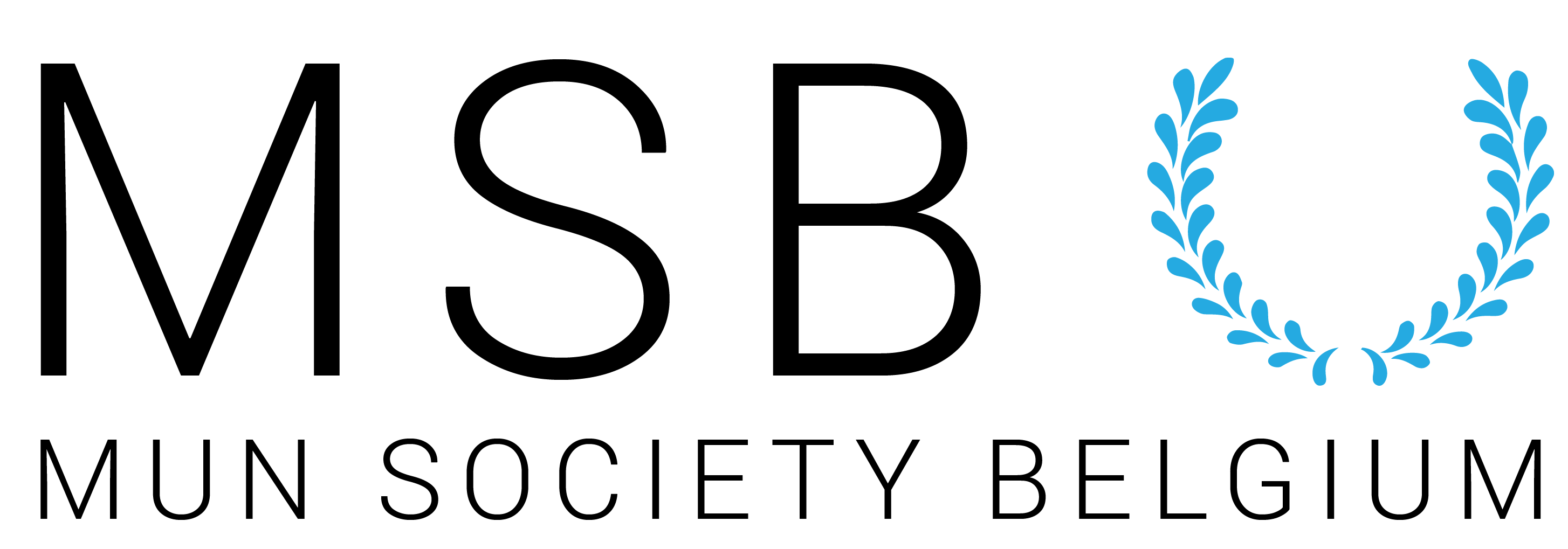
- Friendship in Excellence, Excellence in Friendship
- Abbreviation: MSB
- Formation: 2006
- Type: Foundation
- Purpose: Education
- Location: Belgium
- Official language: English
- Website: http://www.munsocietybelgium.org/

MUN Society Belgium (MSB) is an inter-university organisation dedicated to training Belgian students to take part in Model United Nations conferences domestically and around the world. Founded in 2006, they are noted for their success internationally, as well as being host team for WorldMUN 2014.

== History ==
After participating in the Catalonia Model of United Nations in 2006, six students from various universities across Belgium founded MUN Society Belgium.

MSB have won many accolades, including winning Best Large Delegation at Harvard WorldMUN a record twelve times (most recently in 2025). In 2011, MUN Society Belgium were ranked as the best international delegation, according to the Best College Model UN rankings.

In March 2014, Harvard WorldMUN was hosted in the Belgian city of Brussels, with the organisation named as host team.

== See also ==
- Olivaint Conference of Belgium
