= Eduardo Schlageter =

German painter

- Born: Eduardo Schlageter Singre; November 17, 1893; Caracas, Venezuela
- Died: August 21, 1974 (aged 80); Caracas, Venezuela
- Known for: Painting

Eduardo Schlageter (November 17, 1893 – August 21, 1974) was a Venezuelan-German painter.

== Biography ==
Schlageter was born in Caracas, Miranda on November 17, 1893. His parents were Pius Schlageter and Laura Singre, who met in Germany and got married. After that the couple moved to Venezuela in 1893 from the Grand Duchy of Baden where they were living. The reason of the family's move was because the government of the Venezuelan president Antonio Guzmán Blanco contracted Pius to assume the general direction of the Venezuelan National Imprent, because he was a widely known lithographer.

As soon as Schlageter reached the right age, he was sent to the Venezuelan German School in Caracas, where he studied until he was 8 years old. Then, Eduardo was sent to Germany to study in a school until he finished high school. All over the school and high school years, he often traveled in his vacations to Venezuela to join his family, and in 1913 he decided to continue his studies in the Academy of Fine Arts Munich, but in 1914, the First World War interrupted his studies, and he went back to Venezuela.

In Venezuela he joined the family's lithography business and soon he entered/got in contact with the most prominent artists and painters of the time. Here belong Raúl Santana and Leonico Martinez, the later founders of the Fine Arts Circle of Venezuela. In 1915 he moved back to Europe where he studied in Switzerland, a country he chose because of its neutrality before the war. He studied in Geneva's fine arts academy where his teachers, Ferdinand Hodler and Edouard Ravel, deeply influenced his style and interests.

In 1917 he moved to Paris following Ravel's advice, and soon rises between the local painters. A couple of years later in 1921 he moved to Venezuela, where he continued with his career as a painter and work with his father in the family business. He made several portraits, including one of the vice president of Venezuela Juan Crisóstomo Gómez and many of other privates.

Eduardo Schlageter married a wealthy lady, Carmen Boulton Pietri in March 1929, and four children were born from that marriage. In the 1930s he continued painting Venezuelan landscapes and received both French and Venezuelan awards. In 1942 he traveled to the Marcy Gallery in New York as representative of a Venezuelan art committee and exhibited his creations, gaining considerable prestige.

In 1950 he suffered a heart attack and after this, all the years through he travelled to the thermal baths in Bad Gastein, Germany, where he kept creating more waterpaintings. After he retired in 1963 from the general directive of the family company, he kept traveling to Germany frequently and having exhibitions both in Venezuela and in Europe about his paintings. During the decade of the 1960s he and his family donated a terrain for the construction of the Universidad Metropolitana (Metropolitan University) in Caracas which was founded in 1970.

In 1972 he suffered several heart attacks, and his health was seriously weakened. Two years later he died at the age of 81 on August 21, 1974, in Caracas.
