= The State of the Union (European University Institute) =

Annual forum for high-level reflection on the European Union

- Formation: 2011
- Founder: European University Institute
- Type: Conference
- Headquarters: Florence and Fiesole, Italy
- Official language: English
- Website: stateoftheunion.eui.eu

Since 2011, The State of the Union (SOU) is an annual conference on European affairs, organized by the European University Institute (EUI) in Florence, Italy. The conference provides a platform for discussion on issues affecting the European Union, attracting political leaders, policymakers, and experts from EU institutions.

Each SOU conference focuses on a specific theme, which is determined by a Scientific Committee composed of EUI scholars. The agenda is designed to address contemporary challenges facing the EU. The event is typically held around May 9, coinciding with the anniversary of the Schuman Declaration, a milestone in the history of European integration.

== History ==
The inaugural State of the Union conference was held in 2011 as part of the Festival d'Europa in Florence. Following this, the European University Institute assumed sole responsibility for organizing the event, which has since taken place at its campus in Florence.

== Editions ==
- 2011: The inaugural edition focused on political and economic issues in the EU, including Treaty of Lisbon reforms and post-2008 financial stability.
- 2014: Addressed Europe's social and political future, featuring a live Spitzenkandidaten debate for the European Commission presidency.
- 2016: Emphasized gender equality, with women making up 66% of the speakers and 62% of the Scientific Committee.
- 2017: Focused on European citizenship in light of Brexit, addressing topics like direct democracy and the refugee crisis.
- 2020 (Special Edition): Held online due to COVID-19, with discussions on public health, the economy, and global cooperation.
