= Klaus Traube =

- Born: 25 February 1928; Hanover, Province of Hanover (in present-day Lower Saxony), Germany
- Died: 4 September 2016 (aged 88); Oberursel (Taunus), Germany
- Education: Technical University of Munich
- Scientific career
- Fields: Mechanical engineering

Klaus Traube (25 February 1928 – 4 September 2016) was a German engineer and former manager in the German nuclear power industry and one of its leading opponents. He was the victim of an illegal eavesdropping operation by the BfV (the German domestic intelligence service), because he was falsely suspected of passing on secret information to people sympathizing with terrorism, notably the Red Army Faction.

== Biography ==
Traube was born in Hanover, the son of a social democrat Jewish dentist. In 1936 his father committed suicide—he could no longer bear the terror of the National Socialists. Because of his Jewish background, Klaus had to leave the Gymnasium he attended. Towards the end of World War II, at the age of 17, he was briefly put into an Arbeitslager (labor camp).

After the war, despite his bad experiences, Traube stayed in Germany and studied mechanical engineering (Maschinenbau) and romance studies.

Traube started work at the German AEG, where he quickly rose to become director of the department for nuclear power. He then lived abroad for some time (he worked for General Dynamics in San Diego). Traube returned to Germany and became head of Interatom, a component company of the Kraftwerk Union, which was part of the Siemens conglomerate. Among other things he was responsible for the development of the German fast breeder-project in Kalkar.

Traube was originally a proponent of nuclear power, but the report of the Club of Rome, The Limits to Growth, in 1972 made him slowly change his view. As a result, he had contacts with the student movement in Germany, which at that time was slowly becoming more militant. He was also alleged to have contacts with sympathisers of the Red Army Fraction. The BfV therefore started to monitor him intensively. He was suspected of passing secret information to people sympathising with terrorism. In a covert operation called "Operation Müll" ("operation rubbish"), the BND in 1975 planted a number of wiretaps in Traube's apartment. They also later informed his employer who, as a result, fired him. This illegal operation was uncovered in 1977 by the newspaper Der Spiegel and led to the dismissal of the then minister of the interior Werner Maihofer one year later. Traube was cleared of all charges. The Three Mile Island accident in 1979 finally transformed him into an open opponent of nuclear power.

Since then, he had been one of the most prominent and influential critics of nuclear power. Traube did not believe that the operation of nuclear-power plants was economically feasible or that it was possible to overcome the security risks. Also the construction of fast breeders, essential in the long-term use of nuclear power, was in his view too difficult to be realistic. He was a strong supporter of renewable energy. During the 1980s Traube achieved iconic status among Germans opposed to nuclear power. From 1990 to 1997, he was Director of the Institute for Energy-economics and Energy-politics at the University of Bremen.

Klaus Traube died on 4 September aged 88 in the city of Oberursel, where he used to live.

== See also ==
- Nuclear-Free Future Award
- Anti-nuclear movement
