= Manuel Perez =

Manuel Perez may refer to:

== Arts and entertainment ==
- Manuel Pérez y Curis (1884–1920), Uruguayan poet
- Manuel Perez (musician) (1871–1946), American cornetist and bandleader
- Manuel Perez (animator) (1914–1981), animator for Warner Bros. Cartoons
- Manuel Pérez (director) (1939–2025), Cuban film director
- Manuel "Manny" Pérez Batista or Manny Pérez (born 1969), Dominican actor

== Politics ==
- Manuel Pérez (President of Nicaragua) (1800–1852), President of Nicaragua 1843–1844
- Manuel Pérez (Lieutenant Governor of Upper Louisiana) (1735–1819), Lieutenant Governor of Upper Louisiana 1787–1792
- Manuel Pérez Cárdenas (born 1953), Mexican economist and politician
- Manuel Pérez Guerrero (1911–1985), Venezuelan politician, secretary-general of UNCTAD
- Manuel Pérez Pérez (born 1951), Spanish politician, mayor of Córdoba
- Manuel Pérez Treviño (1890–1945), Mexican revolutionary, politician and ambassador
- V. Manuel Perez (born 1973), U.S. politician, California State Assemblyman

== Sports ==
- Manuel Pérez Benítez, better known as El Cordobés, Spanish matador of the 1960s
- Manu Pérez (born 1978), Spanish ski mountaineer
- Manuel Pérez (footballer, born 1980), Mexican football manager and former midfielder
- Manuel Pérez (boxer) (born 1984), Mexican-American professional boxer in the Lightweight division
- Manuel Perez (footballer, born 1991), French professional football midfielder for Grenoble
- Manuel Pérez (footballer, born 1993), Mexican football winger
- Manny Perez (soccer) (born 1999), American soccer player

== Other ==
- Manuel Pérez García (born 1979), Spanish academic
- Manuel Pérez Jr. (1923–1945), American soldier and Medal of Honor recipient
- Manuel Pérez (teacher) (1890–1951), Puerto Rican teacher and public servant
- Manuel Pérez (guerrilla leader) (1943–1988), leader of the Colombian National Liberation Army from the 1970s to 1998
