= Werner Maihofer =

German jurist and legal philosopher

Werner Maihofer OMRI
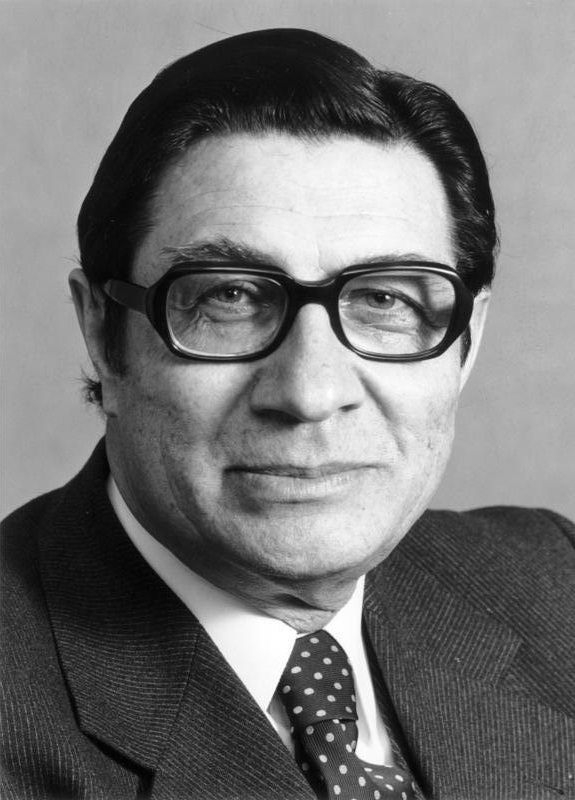
- Werner Maihofer in 1974

Federal Minister of the Interior
- In office 16 May 1974 – 8 June 1978
- Preceded by: Hans-Dietrich Genscher
- Succeeded by: Gerhart Baum

2nd President of the European University Institute
- In office 1982–1986
- Preceded by: Max Kohnstamm
- Succeeded by: Émile Noël

Personal details
- Born: 20 October 1918 Konstanz, Baden
- Died: 6 October 2009 (aged 90) Bad Homburg
- Party: Free Democratic Party
- Education: University of Freiburg
- Profession: Jurist

Werner Maihofer OMRI (20 October 1918 – 6 October 2009) was a German jurist and legal philosopher. He served as Germany's Federal Minister of the Interior from 1974 to 1978 until he resigned after a scandal involving an illegal wiretapping of Klaus Traube.

== Biography ==
An avid speed skater in his youth, Maihofer was a member of the German national team at the 1936 Winter Olympics in Garmisch-Partenkirchen. Maihofer served in the Wehrmacht in World War II. He studied law at the University of Freiburg, and received his Doctor of Laws degree in 1950. Maihofer gained his habilitation in 1953 and eventually obtained a professorship at the University of Saarbrücken.

Maihofer did not join the Free Democratic Party until 1969. One of the leaders of thought of social liberalism in Germany, he co-authored the Freiburg theses alongside Karl-Hermann Flach and Walter Scheel in 1971. In 1974, he succeeded Hans-Dietrich Genscher as Federal Ministry of the Interior, and—during the German Autumn—backed several restraints of civil liberty.

== Illegal wiretapping ==
During the German Autumn the Red Army Fraction increased their activities. Suspected contacts were monitored in the hope of gaining information that might lead to the capture of the militants. Klaus Traube, a nuclear industrialist, was sympathetic to groups opposed to nuclear power. He was suspected of passing secret information to left-wing radicals. In 1975, in a covert operation called "Operation Müll" ("operation trash"), the BND, under the supervision of Maihofer planted a number of wiretaps in Traube's home. They also later informed his employer who, as a result, dismissed him. This illegal operation was uncovered in 1977 by the magazine Der Spiegel. Maihofer resigned from his office in 1978, after taking responsibility for the illegal wiretapping. Maihofer returned to his chair at Bielefeld University which he held since 1970.

== Death ==
Maihofer died on 6 October 2009; he was the oldest German Federal Minister at the time of this death. He was buried in Frankfurt am Main.
