= Patrick Masterson =

Irish academic

Patrick Masterson OMRI
- Born: 19 October 1936; Dublin, Ireland
- Education: University College Dublin; University of Leuven (Ph.D.)
- Occupations: educator

4th President of the European University Institute
- In office 1994–2001
- Preceded by: Émile Noël
- Succeeded by: Yves Mény

Patrick Masterson OMRI (born 1936 in Dublin) is a former president of University College Dublin and the European University Institute.

== Biography ==
He has held numerous appointments in academia, and has authored several books and publications on philosophy and religion. He has written a 'comic campus novel', Quality Time at St Chinian (2017).

He received a First class degree from University College and then took a Ph.D. at Leuven in 1962.

He was a member of the staff of University College Dublin prior to being appointed Dean of the Faculty of Philosophy and Sociology in 1980, Registrar in 1983 and President from 1986 until leaving in December 1993 to become Principal of the European University Institute, Florence, a post he held from 1994 to 2002.

He was Vice-Chancellor of the National University of Ireland from 1987 to 1988.

He is emeritus professor of Philosophy of Religion at University College Dublin.

== Publications ==
- Atheism and Alienation: A Study of the Philosophical Sources of Contemporary Atheism. Dublin & London: Gill and Macmillan. 1971 – via Internet Archive.
- The Sense of Creation - Experience and the God Beyond (Ashgate 2008, ISBN 978-0-7546-6426-0).
- With Seamus Heaney: Articulations: poetry, philosophy, and the shaping of culture (Royal Irish Academy, 2008)
- Approaching God: Between Phenomenology and Theology (Bloomsbury 2013, ISBN 9781623563080).
- Quality Time at St Chinian (Liberties Press, 2017)

Academic offices
Preceded by Thomas Murphy	President of the University College Dublin; 1986–1993	Succeeded by Art Cosgrove
Preceded by Émile Noël	President of the European University Institute; 1994–2002	Succeeded by Yves Mény
