= Manuel Pérez García =

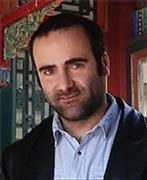
- In the Summer Palace, Beijing, China 2012
- Born: Murcia, Spain

Academic work
- Main interests: Comparison of China to Europe and the Americas
- Notable works: Vicarious Consumers

Manuel Pérez García is associate professor at the Department of History (School of Humanities) of Shanghai Jiao Tong University. He is also Distinguished Researcher at Pablo de Olavide University (UPO) of Seville (Spain). From 2013 to 2017 he was associate professor at the School of International Studies, Renmin University of China.

He received his B.A. History at the Department of Early Modern, Contemporary and American History at the University of Murcia, Spain, in 2002; his Ph.D. from European University Institute (EUI), Florence, Italy, in 2011 and his Postdoctoral Fellowship from Tsinghua University, Beijing, China, in 2013. He is the founder and director of the Global History Network in China (GHN). He is the editor-in-chief of the Palgrave Studies in Comparative Global History.

While he was completing his PhD, Manuel was a student of Jan de Vries at UCBerkeley. His PhD supervisor at the EUI was Bartolomé Yun-Casalilla and his mentor at Tsinghua University was Liu Beicheng.

He has been the first (European) researcher fully based in China to win a European Research Council (ERC) Grant. Pérez García was awarded the grant in December 2015 with his project "GECEM: Global Encounters between China and Europe: Trade Networks, Consumption and Cultural Exchanges in Macau and Marseille, 1680-1840", in which the Pablo de Olavide University (UPO) of Seville (Spain) acts as main European institution for this project.

At Shanghai Jiao Tong University he teaches Modern Economic Growth between China and Europe, International Relations between China and Europe and International Relations between China and Latin America.

Among his latest publications stands out the co-edited book with Lucio de Sousa, Global History and New Polycentric Approaches Europe, Asia and the Americas in a World Network System (XVI-XIXth centuries), Singapore: Palgrave-Macmillan, 2018; and his monograph ‘Vicarious Consumers’: Trans-National Meetings between the West and East in the Mediterranean World (1730-1808), London: Routledge, 2013, and several articles published in international peer reviewed journals listed at the Web of Science as SSCI and AHCI journals.

== Research ==
Pérez García researches the effect of western presences, especially European trade networks, in China during the Qing dynasty, to see how western culture was perceived.

== Awards and honors ==
- ERC (European Research Council)-Starting Grant Award, Brussels (Europe), Brussels (Europe), 2016
- Matteo Ricci Visiting Scholarship Award, School of International Relations, Università di Macerata (Italy), 2015
- Foreign Ministry's Scholarship for Visiting Professors, Secretary of Foreign Affairs of Mexico, 2014
- UKNA-Marie Curie Actions, International Institute for Asian Studies, Leiden University, 2013–2014
- Foreign Ministry's Scholarship for Visiting Professors, Secretary of Foreign Affairs of Mexico, 2013
- 52 Chinese Postdoctoral Science Foundation Grant, 2012–2013
- Post-Doctoral Fellowship, School of Humanities, Tsinghua University, 2011–2013
- Fellowship on European Mobility in Asia ('Argo Program' by the Spanish Government), 2011–2012
- Full grant by the Spanish Government, Ministerio de Educacion y Ciencia, 2006–2010
- Research grant "Salvador Madariaga Awards" by the Spanish Government, M.A.E. (Ministerio de Asuntos Exteriores), 2009–2010
- Full grant by the European University Institute to participate in the exchange program as Visiting Scholar at the University of California at Berkeley, 2008–2009
- Research grant "Salvador Madariaga Awards" by the Spanish Government, M.A.E. (Ministerio de Asuntos Exteriores), 2008–2009
- Research grant "Salvador Madariaga Awards" by the Spanish Government, M.A.E. (Ministerio de Asuntos Exteriores), 2007–2008
- Research grant "Salvador Madariaga Awards" by the Spanish Government, M.A.E. (Ministerio de Asuntos Exteriores), 2006–2007
