= Model United Nations of the University of Chicago =

Registered student organization

Model United Nations of the University of Chicago MUNUC
- Begins: February 6, 2025
- Ends: February 9, 2025
- Frequency: Annual
- Venue: Hyatt Regency Chicago
- Location: Chicago, Illinois
- Country: United States; China; India
- Founded: 1988
- Major events: Model United Nations conference
- Sponsor: University of Chicago
- Website: www.munuc.org

Model United Nations of the University of Chicago (MUNUC) is a high school Model UN conference hosted by the University of Chicago in downtown Chicago, Illinois.

Established in 1988, MUNUC is a four-day conference traditionally held from the first Thursday of February to the first Sunday of February, featuring nearly three-thousand delegates from across the United States and nations around the world, including Mexico and China. Each conference has an opening ceremony and keynote speaker; at the 32nd session in 2020, the keynote speaker was President Barack Obama's Senior Adviser to the President, David Axelrod. MUNUC is the largest conference hosted in the midwestern United States. MUNUC also assists in hosting WEMUN Expo, where it collaborates with other conferences to host Asia's largest Model UN conference. It has been ranked the 2nd best high school Model UN conference in the United States and is considered one of the largest and most prestigious high school level Model UN conferences in the world.

Due to the COVID-19 pandemic, the 34th annual session was held virtually from February 3-6, 2022.

== About MUNUC ==
The Model United Nations of the University of Chicago is a collegiate Model UN organization of undergraduates at the University of Chicago, co-founded in 1988 by Michael Volchok and Maneesh Arora. For thirty-two years, the organization has hosted an annual conference (MUNUC) for high school students across the United States and the world.

At MUNUC, high school students assume the roles of member states of the United Nations or government officials of various international and national bodies, crafting and debating policies to solve a variety of political, social, and economic global issues. The 33rd session will feature six categories of thirty-three total committees.

=== General Assemblies ===
In General Assemblies, delegates act as representatives of member states of the United Nations to draft resolutions solving a variety of broad and universal global issues. General Assemblies include all member states, and are often double-delegation, where two individuals represent one member state in committee. The General Assemblies scheduled to convene for the 34th annual session are:

- International Atomic Energy Agency
- Social, Humanitarian and Cultural Committee
- Special Political and Decolonization Committee
- Disarmament and International Security Committee
- Economic and Financial Committee

=== Economic and Social Councils ===
The Economic and Social Councils include various specialized United Nations agencies. In contrast to General Assemblies, the Economic and Social Councils feature select member states and generally discuss more specific, in-depth aspects of international humanitarian issues. The Economic and Social Councils scheduled to convene for the 34th annual session are:

- UN Commission on the Status of Women
- United Nations Educational, Scientific and Cultural Organization
- The Commission on Crime Prevention and Criminal Justice
- United Nations Human Rights Committee

=== Regional Bodies ===
The Regional Bodies encompass both past and present international supranational or sub-national organizations separate from the United Nations, discussing issues prevalent in their respective geographical or geopolitical regions. The Regional Bodies scheduled to convene for the 34th annual session are:

- Alaska Constitutional Convention, 1955
- African Union
- Nordic Council, 1962
- Arab League
- Organization of American States, 1997

=== Specialized Agencies ===
The Specialized Agencies are often legally binding organizations, discussing or reporting in-depth international and domestic political topics. In some committees, delegates represent individual characters or representatives of private organizations rather than countries. The Specialized Agencies scheduled to convene for the 34th annual session are:

- International Olympic Committee
- United Nations Conference on International Organization
- Council of the Antarctic Treaty
- U.S. Department of Transportation
- Asia Cooperation Dialogue
- World Trade Organization

=== Hybrid ===
- Creation of Singapore, 1963
- Peru–Bolivian Confederation, 1836
- Parliament of Eswatini, 1966
- Creation of the FDA, 1906
- United Nations Security Council, 1966-1970

=== Continuous Crisis ===
Continuous crisis committees simulate historical governing bodies all over the world. Their smaller size allows delegates to speak frequently, and debate moves quickly between topics. Committees with crisis components are differentiated from non-crisis committees in that delegates represent individuals who has personal powers that can be used to further a personal agenda without the knowledge or approval of the rest of committee. MUNUC staffers provide updates on how the actions of individual delegates, and the committee as a whole, are affecting the simulated world of committee. Delegates will pass multiple short-form directives each session to respond to these developments. The Continuous Crisis committees scheduled to convene for the 34th annual session are:

- Cabinet of José Batlle y Ordóñez, 1903
- Mughal Empire, Reign of Akbar the Great
- General Motors Board of Directors, 1950
- Government of Thomas Sankara, 1983
- Senate and Advisors of West Berlin, 2002
- Foreign Policy Team of George H. W. Bush, 1989
- Catherine the Great's Advisors, 1762

=== Ad-Hoc Committee of the Secretary-General ===
The Ad-Hoc Committee of the Secretary-General is the committee in which delegates are only notified of the topic 24 hours before the conference, at which point the background guide is released and the delegates do research.
