= Émile Noël =

French European Union official

Émile Noël OMRI
- Born: 17 November 1922; Istanbul
- Died: 24 September 1996 (aged 73); Viareggio, Italy
- Occupations: European Union official

3rd President of the European University Institute
- In office 1987–1993
- Preceded by: Werner Maihofer
- Succeeded by: Patrick Masterson

Émile Noël OMRI (Istanbul, 17 November 1922 – Viareggio, 24 August 1996) was a senior French European Union official.

== Biography ==
Following his studies at the École Normale Supérieure, his first job was at the European Movement International.

He started his career in the European institutions in 1949, when he became secretary to the General Affairs Committee of the Council of Europe Consultative Assembly, at the request of Guy Mollet, the committee's rapporteur.

He subsequently became involved in the creation of what would eventually become the European Union. In 1952, he was seconded by the Council of Europe to act as director of the secretariat of the constitutional committee of the ad hoc assembly tasked by the six member states of the European Coal and Steel Community to prepare plans for a European Political Community (EPC).

Following the collapse of the EPC project, he returned to the Council of Europe: in 1954 he was appointed as Guy Mollet's chef de cabinet when Mollet was President of the Consultative Assembly of the Council of Europe.

He was subsequently appointed head of Guy Mollet's private office, then deputy director when the socialists returned to power in France in 1956. He acted as intermediary between Matignon and Jean Monnet's Action Committee for the United States of Europe. He played an important role in the negotiations between the Six at Val Duchesse which led to the Treaty of Rome and the Euratom Treaty.

Following the fall of the Mollet Government in June 1957, he returned to the European Community institutions in April 1958 when Robert Marjolin had him appointed as Executive Secretary of the Commission of the European Economic Community. Following the merger of the executives in 1967, he became Secretary-General of the European Commission, a post he occupied until 1987.

In the late 1970s, Noël began to push for the creation of archives for the Community's institutions, similar to national archives. This eventually led to the Historical Archives of the European Union in Florence, which opened their doors in 1983.

He was very close to the commission's Spokesman Beniamino Olivi and to the chefs de cabinet of the successive Presidents of the commission (including Pascal Lamy), and he left his mark on the institution: influence of French administrative principles, use of French as vehicular language, sense of mission in the service of the Community ideal.

From 1987 to 1993 he was President of the European University Institute in Florence.
