= United Netherlands (organization) =

Dutch student organization

- Abbreviation: UNL
- Formation: 2004
- Type: Foundation
- Purpose: Education
- Location: Nijmegen, the Netherlands
- Official language: English
- President: Eleonora Bolhuis
- Event Manager & PSP Executive: Maciej Kaczmarek
- Academic Manager: Vanessa Gabrys
- Relations Manager & UNMD Executive: Zoë Neijts
- Affiliations: Radboud University

United Netherlands (UNL) is an educational student-led organization that focuses on the theory and practice of international relations and diplomacy. It is based at the Radboud University in Nijmegen, the Netherlands.

UNL organizes various student activities related to personal development, including its Public Speaking Program, High School Program. Furthermore, it offers the accredited United Nationds and Multilateral Diplomacy: Theory and Practice (UNMD) course, and its corresponding Delegation to Oxford University and Harvard University.

In the past, UNL has organized various student activities related to the United Nations, including the Radboud international Model United Nations (RiMUN), the Month of the United Nations (MotUN), and WorldMUN 2009.

== History ==
In 2003 two students from the Netherlands, David Vermijs and Tjeerd Tim, organized the first ever Dutch delegation to participate in the Harvard National Model United Nations (HNMUN) at Harvard University in the United States of America. After attending this international event it was agreed that students in the Netherlands would benefit from an organized preparatory track. The second Dutch delegation in 2004 was the first to receive lectures in international law, economics, politics, United Nations rules of procedure and public speaking trainings. The United Netherlands organization was officially founded in 2004 during the aforementioned events.

Due to strong interest in the United Netherlands Delegation it was decided to broaden the scope of the activities by organizing additional events, open to all students. Among the first events to take place where a symposium in 2005 and the first Model United Nations ever organized in Nijmegen in 2006: the Radboud intra-university Model United Nations (later renamed to Radboud international Model United Nations). Furthermore, the preparatory track for HNMUN was intensified and more attention was given to team-building, paper writing, debating and negotiation. The following year the 2005 - 2006 Delegation came back from HNMUN with eight individual awards and the Best International Delegation award, a feat no European delegation had been able to accomplish in at least five years.

=== 2006 - 2007 ===
During OxIMUN 2006 (taking place at Oxford University) awards were won in 7 out of 8 committees. Following this success, in 2007 the United Netherlands Delegation to HNMUN won both the prizes for Best Large Delegation and Best International Delegation, succeeding in something no other European delegation had achieved in the history of the conference. Furthermore, delegates received 22 individual awards.

In the same year two new United Netherlands activities were launched: the Month of the UN, a month-long preparatory course for RiMUN, and a pilot version of the United Netherlands High School Program (HSP), a programme specifically designed for high school students. Four high schools participated in the very first edition of the High School Program.

Furthermore, the United Netherlands alumni association AMUNli was brought into existence and an agreement on structural cooperation was reached between United Netherlands and the Radboud University Nijmegen. With over 250 students participating and 22 nationalities attending, both RiMUN conferences organized during 2006 and 2007 were a success. The following year it was decided to reduce the number of RiMUN conferences to one per academic year.

=== 2007 - 2008 ===
The United Nations and Multilateral Diplomacy course was continued and successfully concluded with the Outstanding Delegation award at HNMUN 2008. The United Netherlands Delegation had been chosen to represent France during the conference.

The RiMUN conference took place in April 2008 and grew in participant numbers to over two hundred. The affiliated MotUN program had its third and fourth edition in November 2007 and April 2008, the latter preceding the RiMUN conference. The High School Program witnessed its second pilot year to ready it for professional implementation in the consecutive year.

Finally, the United Netherlands board of 2007-2008 succeeded in winning the bid to host the Harvard World Model United Nations conference in The Hague in 2009.

=== 2009 - 2010 ===
Despite increasing competition at OxiMUN and HNMUN the United Netherlands Delegation continues to be a successful one. After having won several individual awards at OxiMUN 2009, the United Netherlands Delegation (representing Russia) succeeded in winning the Best International Delegation at HNMUN 2010 for the fourth time.

Participation in the small-scaled MotUN program doubled, now reaching approximately forty participants. After a one-year break due to WorldMUN 2009 the Radboud international Model United Nations was organized again and concluded in April 2010, its success featured both on television and newspaper.

The High School Program witnessed a shift in orientation, broadening its scope from Dutch high schools to schools outside of the Netherlands too. In April 2010, four participating schools successfully participated in the special HSP MUN closing the High School Program.

=== 2018 - 2019 ===
At OxIMUN, the 16th Delegation of United Netherlands managed to win the 'Best Large Delegation Award'. Additionally, 22 individual delegates have been recognized for their outstanding performance.

== Organizational structure ==
The United Netherlands Foundation is led by the Board, including a President, a financial manager, an event manager, a relations manager, a commercial manager, an academic manager and a program manager. The members of the Board work together closely on organizational matters, training the delegation and on long-term projects. The Board is in charge of organizing all the three programs of United Netherlands: the Delegation, the High School Program and the Public Speaking Program. Altogether these teams form the essence of the United Netherlands organization.

Several external Boards are concerned with the overall development and management of all of the active components within the United Netherlands framework. The Board communicates with the Supervisory Board, which is in charge of formally assisting United Netherlands in its general development now and in the future. Furthermore, an Advisory Board has been put in place to provide support and insight if necessary. Finally, United Netherlands is officially supported by its Board of Recommendation, formed by respected members Thom de Graaf, Caecilia van Peski, Diederik Laman Trip, Boris Dittrich, Pieter Feith and former Rector magnificus of the Radboud University Cees Blom and Bas Kortmann. Dries van Agt was a member of the United Netherlands Board of Recommendation in the past.

== The United Nations and Multilateral Diplomacy (UNMD) course ==
The UNMD course concept, generally considered to lie at the origin of United Netherlands, has been designed to teach both the theory and practice of international relations and diplomacy to talented students. The theoretical part of the course lasts half a year and involves lectures on international matters by renowned speakers, intensive training in public speaking, lobbying and negotiation, and a final training week in New York. The practical aspect of the course is embodied by participation in the Oxford international Model United Nations (OxIMUN), and ultimately the Harvard National Model United Nations in Boston, considered to be the oldest, largest and arguably most respected Model United Nations conference in the world.

Approximately thirty students can participate in the course every year. Participants are drawn through a selection process which consists of three rounds and takes place twice a year.

The preparation track, the training week and MUN conferences together form the United Nations and Multilateral Diplomacy: Theory and Practice course. The course is equivalent to a (Dutch) BA3 course and is academically accredited with 10 ECTS through the Radboud University. Participants are trained, coached and given feedback by two Head Delegates and MUN Trainer carrying the responsibility for the Delegation.

== Radboud international Model United Nations (RiMUN) ==
RiMUN is a Model United Nations Conference hosted by United Netherlands. The first edition was organized in December 2005 in Nijmegen, then named Radboud intrauniversity Model United Nations. 26 different countries were represented. The theme of the conference was 'Freedom vs Liberty - in an international perspective'.

In April 2006 the second edition took place in Nijmegen. This time called Radboud international Model United Nations, participation was open to students from all Dutch universities and abroad. This edition was centered on the theme of the Millennium Development Goals. Speakers in this edition were Mandeep Bains, Ruud Lubbers and Dries van Agt.

From November 24 to November 26, 2006, the next RiMUN took place. The theme was 'War on War - Peace and Security in the 21st century'. Speakers were, among others, Pieter Kooijmans, C. F. Meindersma and Maarten van Rossem.

RiMUN 2007 was centered on the theme Fight 4 Freedoms: Roosevelt's 1941 State of the Union revisited. Delegates re-enacted the League of Nations, discussed the limits to freedom of religion in a symposium and discussed female circumcision.

At RiMUN 2008, United Netherlands hosted Jan Pronk and Thom de Graaf.

In 2009, United Netherlands was allowed to host the 2009 WorldMUN conference. Therefore, in 2009 no RiMUN was organized, as United Netherlands cooperated with Harvard University to host WorldMUN 2009 in The Hague.

In April 2010, RiMUN 2010 was organized, based around the theme Times of Trial, in order to discuss global challenges the world faces in the 21st century. Keynote speakers included Dries van Agt and Thom de Graaf.

RiMUN 2011 took place from April 15–17, 2011 and centered on the theme Shifting Balances. Participants from over 25 different universities and coming from over 12 different countries, discussed the issues surrounding shifting global power relations, and the changing standards towards warfare, human rights violations and the environment. Other themes were rising tensions at the Korean Peninsula, the global consumption of oil, nationalist terrorism, child trafficking and the completion of the European Union.

== See also ==
- Model United Nations
- United Nations
