= Harvard World Model United Nations =

Annual traveling model UN conference

Harvard World Model United Nations (HMUN)
- Abbreviation: WorldMUN
- Formation: 1953
- Type: NGO
- Headquarters: Cambridge, Massachusetts, USA
- Location: Australia (Sydney), China (Beijing), India (Bengaluru), Africa, Kenya (Nairobi), UAE (Dubai), USA (Boston)
- Official language: English/rarely regional
- Secretary General: Vinny Li
- Main organ: Secretariat
- Website: www.worldmun.org

The Harvard World Model United Nations (WorldMUN) is an annual traveling model United Nations conference that is run by the Harvard International Relations Council. The conference was first held in 1992. The conference aims to foster cultural connectivity and allow university students aged 18–25 to gain experience in diplomacy and debate.

WorldMUN uses the American style of model United Nations. Delegates are generally paired with another delegate from their delegation in dual delegations, with discussions occurring both inside and outside the rooms simultaneously.

== History ==
WorldMUN uses a bidding process to select locations for each conference. The conference is generally held in March.

Similar to other conferences, there are also workshops, social events showcasing local culture, and a global village where participant teams can share delicacies and traditions from their home countries. WorldMUN has had many guest speakers over the years, notably Pope Francis in Rome and King Felipe VI in Madrid.

From 2016 onwards, the conference began giving out WorldMUN spirit awards to teams for showing exceptional adherence to the spirit of WorldMUN and the United Nations. The team from Andrés Bello Catholic University (Venezuela) were the first recipients of this award.

The 29th edition of the conference was scheduled for Tokyo in March 2020, but was cancelled and rescheduled to 2021. However, with the continued health safety concerns and the pandemic's prevailing impact on global travel, the Tokyo conference was rescheduled again to 2022. The 2021 conference happened virtually over Zoom.

The organization works closely with a social impact-oriented group, the Resolution Project, aimed at fostering global youth leadership. The Resolution Project was founded by WorldMUN Secretariat alumni.

== Committees ==
Committees in the past have included committees of the United Nations General Assembly, the Security Council, the subcommittees of ECOSOC, regional bodies (such as the African Union or European Union), specialized agencies of the United Nations, crisis simulation committees and, uniquely, simulations of the entire general assembly.

In crisis committees, unlike General Assembly committees, regional bodies, and specialized agencies, the actual topic, basis, and circumstances of the formal debate are only fully disclosed after the committee session begins. Delegations are rarely taken up as countries, but rather as governments, individuals, or figures that are directly related to a particular crisis. At WorldMUN these committees usually simulate formal debate in an extremely parliamentary manner and follow a sequence that is unchanging and rigid.

=== Specialized Agencies ===
In MUNs, and more specifically at HMUN, specialized bodies and agencies are much smaller and fast-paced committees that a designed for delegates seeking committees with narrower mandates and faster-paced decision-making and nimble decreision-making skills in specialized and skill-warranting areas. These committees simulate formal debate in the Model United Nations manner, but within a very narrow and demanding mandate. They require delegates who are able to think in a critical manner and who are able to solve issues with the help of other delegates that may be extremely difficult to resolve, usually containing many interconnected factors.

Rather than being committees of general debate, specialized bodies are those that have very specific and particular needs or demands that must be resolved. Debate within specialized agencies is policy-heavy and evidence-based, with a clear path toward what is encouraged to be accomplished through the resolution. Here, resolutions are detailed operational plans and not just broad ideas meant to solve an issue. This means that they contain everything from who acts, how programs are funded, where they are implemented, how they are implemented, and how success is monitored, among other details.

Overall, specialized agencies warrant a higher level of research, precision, and diplomacy in order to resolve real-world problems in the most appropriate and efficient manner possible. This includes aligning national policy with the agency's mandate, building expert-driven blocs, and proposing solutions that could realistically be adopted and implemented in the real world.

Some committees that would be considered specialized agencies include:

- UNICEF, children's rights, health, education, and protection
- World Health Organization (WHO), global health and disease control
- UN Human Rights Council (UNHRC), human rights protection and violations
- UN Women, gender equality and women's empowerment
- UNESCO, education, culture, and heritage
- International Atomic Energy Agency (IAEA), nuclear safety and non-proliferation

=== Crisis Committees ===
Crisis committees are committees often regarded as more demanding than traditional General Assembly formats in MUNs. They simulate highly volatile and fragile situations, or more specifically, a crisis that is seen to rapidly change in factors and circumstances. Here, delegates must respond to unfolding events as they are presented to the committee after the commencement of formal debate, rather than follow a fixed agenda. The body operates in a state of constant uncertainty driven by frequent crisis updates released at consecutive intervals that escalate and alter the situation. The committee has a tendency to be extremely unhinged and unpredictable, which makes it difficult to adapt to. A major factor contributing to this is that, unlike General Assembly committees, regional bodies, and specialized agencies, the actual topic, basis, and circumstances of the formal debate are only fully disclosed after the committee session begins. This implies that a delegate can never be fully prepared for what is thrown his or her way, just as would be the case in a real-world developing crisis.

Delegates selected for crisis committees must, by necessity, be individuals of 'exceptional caliber'. They are expected to demonstrate intellectual judgment, problem-solving skills, and an open mindset. The ability to apply critical analysis from multiple perspectives is essential, particularly when responding to rapidly evolving crises. Without such capability, situations may escalate quickly, becoming increasingly complex and difficult to manage.

Participants must be adept at identifying the underlying causes of issues and formulating coherent, non-contradictory solutions within tight time constraints. Consequently, crisis committees are widely regarded as some of the most demanding and intellectually rigorous environments in Model United Nations, especially for those with limited prior exposure or subject knowledge.

Unlike traditional committees, delegates in crisis settings do not typically represent countries. Instead, they assume the roles of governments, key individuals, or influential figures directly connected to the crisis in question. At HMUN, these committees operate under clearly defined parliamentary procedures, as detailed in official delegate preparation materials. Proceedings follow a structured and consistent sequence, closely emulating the function of real-world decision-making bodies responding to active and unfolding crises..

Debate in crisis committees is very formal and highly action-oriented, as delegates are technically responding to a developing crisis where all actions must be taken with urgency and precision to resolve the situation. Instead of long speeches and resolutions, crisis committees mitigate crises through directives and crisis notes. Success depends on speed, persuasion, and strategic thinking rather than procedural mastery, as crisis committees are highly unpredictable and do not follow a standard procedural foundation in the same manner as other committees.

It is highly unlikely that a crisis committee would operate with double delegations, as most procedures are heavily individual-oriented and benefit singular decision-makers. Managing two delegates sharing one role would be extremely difficult. As a result, double delegations in crisis committees are considered a rarity due to the committee's complexity and demanding nature.

Overall, crisis committees require delegates to react with extreme speed and agility to constantly changing situations and crisis updates. They are generally not suited to all ranges of delegates. It takes a combination of talent, critical thinking, hard work, preparation, research, and dedication. While increased experience in MUNs or formal debate may make it slightly easier to adapt to crisis bodies, they are often described as among the more demanding committee formats within Model United Nations conferences, not only in MUNs but also when compared conceptually to real-world decision-making bodies.

Crisis committees in MUNs are usually historical or based on events and crises that have already occurred, such as World War I, World War II, the Cuban Missile Crisis, the Imperial Japanese Cabinet, and the French Revolution.

Some crisis committees focus on future-based scenarios, including AI governance crises, space warfare or space security councils, climate collapse crises, and cyberwarfare crises.

Others are fictional or ad-hoc in nature and often relate to national or global security, such as zombie apocalypses, dystopian world governments, corporate boardroom crises, or fictional UN emergency councils.

However, in the non-fictional United Nations, crisis cabinets always operate in the present tense and deal with real-world situations. These cabinets are supposedly composed of individuals with logical and decision-making abilities that operate well under high pressure situations. This makes crisis committees, both in simulation and in reality, of a constantly changing nature.

== WorldMUN Conferences ==
Session	Year	Location								
Session	Year	City	Country	Secretary-General	Host Team President	Director-General	Local Host Team	Conference Venue	Delegation Awards	Ref.
1	1992	Miedzyzdroje	Poland	Geraldine Acuña	N/A		N/A	Vienna House Amber Baltic Miedzyzdroje		
2	1993	Prague	Czech Republic	Joshua A. Saloman	N/A		N/A			
3	1994	Luxembourg	Luxembourg	Ankur U. Saraiya	N/A		N/A			
4	1995	Geneva	Switzerland	Emmeline Li	N/A		N/A			
5	1996	Amsterdam	Netherlands	Aram A. Schvey	N/A		N/A			
6	1997	Budapest	Hungary	Andras Forgacs	Illes Dudas		Budapest University of Economic Sciences			
7	1998	Brussels	Belgium	Johs Pierce			Vrije Universiteit Brussel		Best Delegation: Universidade de Brasilia	
8	1999	Cambridge	United Kingdom	Winnie Li	Julian Huppert		University of Cambridge			
9	2000	Athens	Greece	James Mwangi			National and Kapodistrian University of Athens		Best Large Delegation: The College of William & Mary	
10	2001	Istanbul	Turkey	Rohan Gulrajani						
11	2002	Belo Horizonte	Brazil	Aspasia Karalis			Pontifícia Universidade Católica de Minas Gerais	Ouro Minas Palace Hotel	Best Large Delegation: Yale University; Best Small Delegation:	
12	2003	Heidelberg	Germany	George Tsiatis			University of Heidelberg	University of Heidelberg - Old Town Campus	Best Large Delegation: Best Small Delegation: West Point Military Academy	
13	2004	Sharm El-Sheikh	Egypt	George Tsiatis			Modern Sciences and Arts University	Maritim Jolie Ville Mövenpick Golf, Resort & Conference Center	Best Large Delegation: Best Small Delegation: West Point Military Academy	
14	2005	Edinburgh	United Kingdom	Alex Captain			University of Edinburgh	University of Edinburgh	Best Large Delegation: The College of William & Mary; Best Small Delegation: West Point Military Academy	
15	2006	Beijing	China	Victor Bicalho			Peking University	Peking University	Best Large Delegation: The College of William & Mary; Best Small Delegation: West Point Military Academy	
16	2007	Geneva	Switzerland	Khalid Yasin			École Polytechnique Fédérale de Lausanne	Centre International de Conférences Genève	Best Large Delegation: Universidad Católica Andrés Bello; Best Small Delegation: Lahore University of Management Sciences	
17	2008	Puebla	Mexico	Joseph Kerns	Manuel Rosas Vázquez		Benemérita Universidad Autónoma de Puebla	Puebla Convention Center	Best Large Delegation: MUN Society Belgium; Best Small Delegation: Lahore University of Management Sciences; Outstanding Large Delegation: Universidad Central de Venezuela	
18	2009	The Hague	Netherlands	Timur Kalimov	José Dominguez Alvarez		United Netherlands	World Forum Convention Center and the International Criminal Court	Best Large Delegation: MUN Society Belgium; Best Small Delegation: Lahore University of Management Sciences	
19	2010	Taipei	Taiwan	Ami Nash	Jason Tsung-Cheng Hou		National Taiwan University	Taipei International Convention Center	Best Large Delegation: MUN Society Belgium; Best Small Delegation: Lahore University of Management Sciences	
20	2011	Singapore	Singapore	Reihan Nadarajah	Jing Zhi & Sharmeen Alam		National University of Singapore	Suntec Singapore International Convention Centre	Best Large Delegation: MUN Society Belgium; Best Small Delegation:	
21	2012	Vancouver	Canada	Kat Tang	Kenneth Chan		University of British Columbia	Vancouver Convention Centre	Best Large Delegation: Universidad Catolica Andres Bello Best Small Delegation: Claremont McKenna College	
22	2013	Melbourne	Australia	Charlene Wong	Siamak Loni		Monash University & RMIT University	Melbourne Convention and Exhibition Centre	Best Large Delegation: MUN Society Belgium; Best Small Delegation: The College of William & Mary; Outstanding Large Delegation: Universidad Central de Venezuela	
23	2014	Brussels	Belgium	Grace Y. Qi	Jens Wauters	Lisa Wang	KULMUN & MUN Society Belgium	Egmont Palace, European Council and The Hotel Brussels	Best Large Delegation: Peruvian Universities Outstanding Large Delegation: Universidad Simón Bolívar Best Small Delegation: Georgetown University	
24	2015	Seoul	(South Korea); Republic of Korea	Brian K. Mwarania	Hyun-Joo Lee		Hankuk University of Foreign Studies	Korea International Exhibition Center	Best Large Delegation: Universidad Simón Bolívar Outstanding Large Delegation: Universidad Católica Andrés Bello Best Small Delegation: Claremont McKenna College	
25	2016	Rome	Italy	Joseph P. Hall	Riccardo Messina	Daniel Dong	United Network Association	Sheraton Roma Hotel & Conference Center	Best Large Delegation: MUN Society Belgium Outstanding Large Delegation: Peruvian Universities Best Small Delegation: Claremont McKenna College WorldMUN Spirit Award: Universidad Católica Andrés Bello	
26	2017	Montreal	Canada	Parijat Lal	Jonathan Sasson	Nabig Chaudhary	Dawson College	Palais des congrès de Montréal	Best Large Delegation: MUN Society Belgium Outstanding Large Delegation: be.boosted Best Small Delegation: Washington University in St. Louis Outstanding Small Delegation: West Point Military Academy WorldMUN Spirit Award: Universidad Metropolitana	
27	2018	Panama City	Panama	Nicholas Abbott	Alan Smith	Catherine Brennan	Universidad Católica Santa María La Antigua	Atlapa Convention Centre	Best Large Delegation: Peruvian Debate Society Outstanding Large Delegation: MUN Society Belgium Best Small Delegation: Claremont McKenna College Outstanding Small Delegation: Georgetown University WorldMUN Spirit Award: Universidad Metropolitana	
28	2019	Madrid	Spain	Spencer Ma	Alba Gavaliugov Mendez	Manav Khandelwal	Spanish Alliance of Model United Nations	Palacio Municipal de Congresos	Best Large Delegation: Universidad Metropolitana Outstanding Large Delegation: Peruvian Debate Society Best Small Delegation: Claremont McKenna College Outstanding Small Delegation: Princeton University WorldMUN Spirit Award: Universidad Simón Bolívar	
29	2021	Tokyo	Japan	Anirudh Suresh	Jiaqi Liu	Esteban Flores	Sophia University	Online	Best Large Delegation: MUN Society Belgium Outstanding Large Delegation: Universidad Católica Andrés Bello; Universidad Metropolitana Best Small Delegation: American University of Beirut Outstanding Small Delegation: University of Indonesia WorldMUN Spirit Award: University of Indonesia Best High School Delegation: Institutos Educacionales Asociados	(Note: Originally set for March 2020. Postponed due to the COVID-19 Outbreak)
30	2022	Tokyo	Japan	Hope Kudo	Kanon Yamagishi	Javin Pombra	Sophia University	Online	Best Large Delegation: MUN Society Belgium; Best Small Delegation: Peruvian Debate Society; Peruvian Universities	
31	2023	Paris	France	Olivia Fu	Eric Guiochon & Mathieu Bailly	Katherine Zhu	Comité Interuniversitaire des Nations Unies de Paris (CINUP)	Trocadéro Business Centre; Sorbonne University	Best Large Delegation: MUN Society Belgium Outstanding Large Delegation: Universidad Católica Andrés Bello Best Small Delegation: Lahore University of Management Sciences Outstanding Small Delegation: Hult MUN WorldMUN Spirit Award: Universidad Metropolitana	
32	2024	Taipei	Taiwan	Davin Shi	Erica Peng & Rubin Ku	Michael Baxter	MUN Society Taiwan		Best Delegation: MUN Society Belgium Outstanding Delegation: Peruvian Universities; West Point Military Academy WorldMUN Spirit Award: Universidad Católica Andrés Bello	
33	2025	Manila	Philippines	Kevin Lin	Tyler Javier & Phoebe Silang	Ashley Romo	WorldMUN Philippines		Best Large Delegation: MUN Society Belgium Outstanding Large Delegation: Peruvian Universities; Universidad Católica Andrés Bello Best Small Delegation: American University of Beirut Outstanding Small Delegation: Claremont McKenna College WorldMUN Spirit Award: be.boosted	
34	2026	Lima	Peru	Vinny Li	Diego Cubillas	Jessica Zhuo	Peruvian Universities		Best Large Delegation: HultMUN Society Outstanding Large Delegation: MUN Society Belgium Best Small Delegation: Claremont McKenna College Outstanding Small Delegation: be.boosted WorldMUN Spirit Award: Universidad Católica Andrés Bello	

== See also ==
- Model United Nations
- List of model United Nations conferences – a list of notable MUN conferences
- Harvard International Relations Council
