= Harvard International Relations Council =

Non-profit organization

- Abbreviation: HIRC
- Formation: 1955 (formally incorporated in 1974)
- Type: NGO 501(C)3
- Tax ID no.: 04-2581946
- Purpose: Education
- Location: Cambridge, Massachusetts
- Official language: English
- President: Alice Yang
- Main organ: Board of Directors
- Affiliations: United Nations Department of Public Information
- Website: www.harvardirc.org

The Harvard International Relations Council (HIRC) is a non-profit organization that seeks to promote awareness of international relations based out of Harvard University. As several semi-independent but centrally administered programs, the IRC focuses on a number of different outreach areas in an attempt to engage and inform people on international issues and policy-making. Programs within the IRC include:

- Harvard Model United Nations (HMUN)
- Harvard National Model United Nations (HNMUN)
- Harvard Intercollegiate Model United Nations (ICMUN)
- Harvard International Review (HIR)
- Harvard Program in International Education (HPIE)
- Harvard International Relations on Campus (IRoC)
- Model Security Council (MSC)

The IRC is also the largest student organization at Harvard College, and the largest student nonprofit a registered 501(c)(3) The organization is run entirely by undergraduate students, and it is an affiliated non-governmental organization with the United Nations Department of Public Information.

== Leadership ==
The IRC leadership is divided between a board of directors and IRC Central. The board of directors is a group of members that collectively oversee the 6 individual programs and manage the direction of the organization. Members include one program head from each of the six individual programs and a number of elected members by the IRC body. The board of directors then vote on the appointment of the IRC President.

IRC Central Staff is chosen by the IRC board of directors and hold their corporate position until the election of a new board of directors. These officers head operations that allow to promote international education and social impact, to manage its programs in a financially sound and sustainable manner, and to maintain its status as a non-profit corporation and an accredited NGO.

== Harvard Model United Nations ==

Harvard Model United Nations (HMUN) is one of the oldest Model United Nations simulations in the world having been founded in 1953 when the Harvard student group that had been simulating the League of Nations since the 1920s decided to start a new simulation to reflect the new organization that had been established at the end of World War II. Every year, students from around the world attend the conference, which is currently held at the Sheraton Boston Hotel in Boston, Massachusetts. The next session of Harvard Model United Nations will be the seventy-second session, and it will be held from January 25 to January 28, 2024. Due to conference expansion, HMUN 2024 will be the largest conference in its storied history, with over 4,000 participants in attendance. As such, the conference will also hold committee sessions at the Boston Marriott Copley Place.

Like many Model United Nations simulations, HMUN offers committees in four main categories:

- The General Assembly (GA)
- The Economic and Social Council (ECOSOC), including an NGO Program
- Regional Bodies, like the African Union
- Specialized Agencies (SA), which include unique standing committees like the Security Council and also include crisis committees (centered around a developing crisis) and the Press Corps.

Delegates may be tasked to represent countries or role-play famous individuals and cabinet members, and must work to solve problems through debate and compromise to achieve policy-making goals while still representing the interests of their assigned role.

=== Staff ===
The HMUN 2024 conference has a staff of over 200 Harvard undergraduates.

Staff members are organized into three groups: the Secretariat, the Senior Staff, and the Junior Staff.

==== Secretariat ====
The Secretariat consists of the top-level officers of Harvard Model United Nations who oversee all branches and activities of the conference.

There are ten Secretariat members: the Secretary-General, who is responsible for the conference as a whole, the Director-General, who is the administrative head of the conference, the Comptroller, who is responsible for conference finances, and seven Under-Secretaries-General in the various branches of the conference: Administration, Business, Operations, and the four Substantive organs which include the General Assembly, the Economic and Social Council, the Regional Bodies, and the Specialized Agencies. The DG, Comptroller, Administration, Operations, and Business organs comprise the executive organs.

The Secretary-General is elected annually in March by the Board of Directors of the International Relations Council and the outgoing staff of the previous conference. He or she is traditionally a member of the past year's Secretariat, along with the Director-General. The remaining Secretariat members are appointed by the Secretary-General in coordination with the Secretary-General of HNMUN. For HMUN 2025, Calvin Osborne will serve as Secretary-General and Nicholas Yang will serve as Director-General.

==== Senior staff ====
The senior staff, like the secretariat, includes both executive and substantive staffers.

On the executive side, senior staff are the direct deputies of their respective USG. Each organ has several senior staff filling various responsibilities:

Director-General Organ:

- Deputy-Director-General: General assistant to the DG on hotel and tech-related issues. Officially in charge of the conference when the Secretariat is in meetings or otherwise unavailable.
- Senior Director of Security: Manages security staff and operations.
- Director of Technology: Manages computer labs and provides technical support.
- Director of Special Projects: Occasionally appointed to work on long term conference-related projects.

The Administration organ has several directors of administration who are the immediate assistants to the USG and who respond to questions about the conference and manage conference registration, and the business organ similarly has several directors of business, responsible for ad sales and conference amenities like catering. The comptroller organ has two assistant comptrollers.

On the Substantive side, senior staff consists of committee directors, who are the substantive authorities for each committee and prepare the study guides that serve as the foundational documents for delegate preparation, and crisis directors, who coordinate crisis scenarios on continual crisis committees.

The Operations organ includes Technology directors, Directors of crisis and Multimedia who handle presentations, and Directors of Substantive support.

==== Junior staff ====
Again, junior staff vary from organ to organ, and can be split into executive and substantive staffers.

On the executive side, each organ has specialized assistant directors (ADs):

- the DG organ has several ADs of security,
- the administration organ has several ADs of Administration,
- the business organ has several ADs of Business,

and each of these ADs assist their respective senior staff and USG with their duties.

On the Substantive side:

- moderators moderate debate and enforce the rules of procedure, and
- assistant directors prepare supplemental research and assist committee directors with running each committee

The Substantive support organ has similar assistants to the committee directors.

=== Awards ===
Like most Model UN conferences, HMUN recognizes exceptional delegates and schools with awards at the end of the conference. Awards are given to the delegates who demonstrate strong preparation, excellent speaking skills, adherence to national policy, and exceptional abilities of compromise and negotiation, and they are awarded by the directors of each committee. The number of awards on a committee varies by size, but each committee gives out at least one of each of the following awards:

- Best Delegate
- Outstanding Delegate
- Honorable Mention
- Diplomatic Commendation

Unlike many conferences, HMUN does give Verbal Commendations.

Based on the number of delegates receiving awards, awards are then given to the delegations that represent the best collection of delegates.

== Harvard National Model United Nations ==
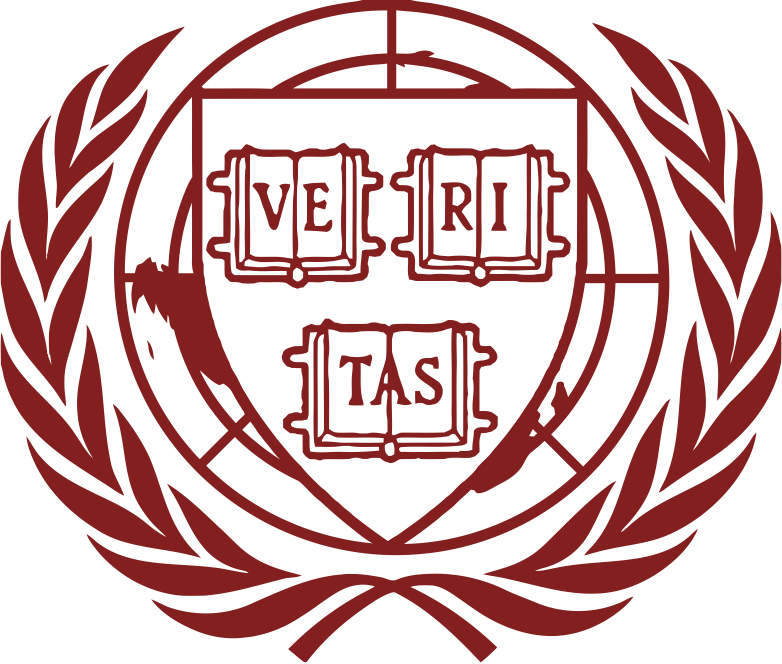
Harvard National Model United Nations logo

Harvard National Model United Nations or HNMUN is the longest running college-level Model United Nations simulation in the world and among the largest in the United States. HNMUN is an annual four-day event held in February, composed of three thousand university students of which half tend to be international students, often from over 40 countries. The conference is held every year at the Boston Park Plaza.

Awards are conferred upon individual delegates in their respective committees and to delegations in the categories of best small, best large, and best international delegation.

In 2012, a regional HNMUN was established, Harvard National Model United Nations Latin America, held in a similar fashion as Harvard World Model United Nations. Daniel Ennis and Victor Arruda will serve as Secretary and Director-General for the 2025 edition.

In 2024, the second regional HNMUN was established, Harvard National Model United Nations Africa, in Nairobi, Kenya with Chukwudi Ilozue and Oscar Berry serving as founding Secretary and Director-General.

=== HNMUN Conferences ===
Session	Year	Secretary-General	Director-General	Conference Venue	Delegation Awards
LIII	2007			Boston Park Plaza	Best Large Delegation: United Netherlands; Outstanding Large Delegation: Best Small Delegation: Best International Delegation: United Netherlands
LIV	2008			Boston Park Plaza	Best Large Delegation: University of Pennsylvania; Outstanding Large Delegation: United Netherlands; Best Small Delegation: Florida International University; Best International Delegation: Universidad Católica Andrés Bello
LV	2009			Boston Park Plaza	Best Large Delegation: Yale University; Outstanding Large Delegation: University of Chicago; Best Small Delegation: United States Military Academy; Best International Delegation: United Netherlands
LVI	2010			Boston Park Plaza	Best Large Delegation: Outstanding Large Delegation: Best Small Delegation: Best International Delegation: United Netherlands
LVII	2011	Ricky Hanzich		Boston Park Plaza	Best Large Delegation: Yale University; Outstanding Large Delegation: University of Chicago; Best Small Delegation: United States Military Academy; Best International Delegation: Universidad Metropolitana
LVIII	2012	Dominik P. Nieszporowski		Boston Park Plaza	Best Large Delegation: Yale University; Outstanding Large Delegation: University of Chicago; Best Small Delegation: George Washington University; Best International Delegation: Universidad Simón Bolívar
LIX	2013	Gillian Farrell		Boston Park Plaza	Best Large Delegation: University of Pennsylvania; Outstanding Large Delegation: University of Chicago; Best Small Delegation: United States Military Academy; Best International Delegation: Universidad Católica Andrés Bello
LX	2014	Richard Ebright		Boston Park Plaza	Best Large Delegation: University of Chicago; Outstanding Large Delegation: Florida International University; Best Small Delegation: University of Miami; Best International Delegation: Institut d'etudes politiques de Lille
LXI	2015	Jeffrey Schroeder		Boston Marriott Copley Place	Best Large Delegation: Outstanding Large Delegation: Best Small Delegation: Best International Delegation: Universidad Central de Venezuela
LXII	2016	Aman Rizvi		Boston Park Plaza	Best Large Delegation: Outstanding Large Delegation: Best Small Delegation: Best International Delegation: Universidad Simón Bolívar
LXIII	2017	Bennett E. Vogt	Aaisha Shah	Boston Park Plaza	Best Large Delegation: Universidad Católica Andrés Bello; Outstanding Large Delegation: Universidad Simón Bolívar; Best International Delegation: Universidad Católica Andrés Bello
LXIV	2018	Sarah S. Anderson	Annie Warnke	Boston Park Plaza	Best Large Delegation: University of Chicago; Outstanding Large Delegation: Florida International University; Best Small Delegation: Universidad Simón Bolívar; Best International Delegation: Universidad Metropolitana
LXV	2019	Antonio J. Soriano		Boston Park Plaza	Best Large Delegation: Florida International University; Outstanding Large Delegation: University of Pennsylvania; Best Small Delegation: Universidad Simón Bolívar; Best International Delegation: Universidad Central de Venezuela
LXVI	2020	Noah D. Cominsky	Marinna C. Okawa	Boston Park Plaza	Best Large Delegation: University of Chicago; Outstanding Large Delegation: Yale University; Best Small Delegation: Boston University; Outstanding Small Delegation: University of North Carolina at Chapel Hill; Best International Delegation: Universidad Metropolitana
LXVII	2021	Katherine M. Lempres	Matthew T. Rossi	Online	Best Large Delegation: Florida International University; Outstanding Large Delegation: McGill University; Best Small Delegation: Boston University; Outstanding Small Delegation: University of California, Los Angeles; Best International Delegation: Universidad Católica Andrés Bello
LXVIII	2022	Andrew Y. J. Kim	Matthew Dickey	Boston Marriott Copley Place	Best Large Delegation: Georgetown University; Outstanding Large Delegation: Universidad Metropolitana; Best Small Delegation: Boston University; Outstanding Small Delegation: U.S. Military Academy at West Point; Best International Delegation: Universidad Catolica Andres Bello
LXIX	2023	Fatoumata B. Ouedrago	Yanxi Fang	Boston Marriott Copley Place	Best Large Delegation: Universidad Metropolitana; Outstanding Large Delegation: Universidad Catolica Andres Bello; Best Small Delegation: Lahore University of Management Sciences; Outstanding Small Delegation: U.S. Military Academy at West Point; Best International Delegation: Universidad Metropolitana
LXX	2024	Corine Chung	Aaron Eudaimon	Boston Marriott Copley Place	Best Large Delegation: Universidad Metropolitana; Outstanding Large Delegation: University of Chicago; Best Small Delegation: Lahore University of Management Sciences; Outstanding Small Delegation: U.S. Military Academy; Best International Delegation: Universidad Metropolitana
LXXI	2025	Vivian Yee	Annabelle Krause	Boston Marriott Copley Place	

==== Notes ====
1.The 2021 session of HNMUN was moved online due to the COVID-19 pandemic.

=== Staff ===
There are three levels to the HNMUN staff structure: the Secretariat (consisting of the Director-General and the Under Secretaries General), which is led by the Secretary-General; the Senior Staff (consisting of Directors); and the Junior Staff (consisting of assistant directors).

Senior and Junior staff is split into two branches: an executive branch and a substantive branch. The executive branch takes care of the Administrative, Business, Finance, and Operations side of the conference. The substantive branch creates the delegates' committee experience, and is divided into the General Assembly, the Economic and Social Council and Regional Bodies, and the Specialized Agencies.

==== Secretariat ====
As with HMUN, the Secretariat oversees the administration of the conference. The Secretary-General is similarly elected, and appoints his or her Secretariat in coordination with the Secretary-General of HMUN. There are nine secretariat members: the Secretary-General, who is responsible for the conference as a whole, the Director-General, who is the administrative head of the conference, and seven Under-Secretaries-General in the various branches of the conference: administration, business, finance, and operations, and the three substantive organs, the General Assembly, the Economic and Social Council & Regional Bodies, and the Specialized Agencies.

==== Staff selection ====
HNMUN staff is made entirely of Harvard undergraduate students. The staff selection process for one year's HNMUN conference begins immediately following the previous year's conference. First, the Secretary-General for the next conference is elected by the experienced staff members of HNMUN and HMUN. The candidates for Secretary-General are generally members of the past year's Secretariat. Once the Secretary-General has been elected, former members of the HNMUN Senior Staff apply for Secretariat positions. After Secretariat has been chosen in late March, members of the former Junior Staff are welcome to apply for about 80 Senior Staff positions. Junior Staff (assistant directors and Committee Moderators) is then selected in the fall. Both Senior and Junior Staff are chosen by the Secretariat after a lengthy application and interview process. By late fall, the conference's staff is complete. The full staff reaches well over 200 students.

==== Committee structure ====
Model UNs follow the general structure of the UN but for logistical and educational reasons, the structure differs somewhat. HNMUN's structure is similar to most Model UNs but there are a few important differences.

- Only one resolution may be passed on each topic. This is meant to stress consensus and compromise between delegates. This is achieved by the fact that:
- Resolutions cannot be sponsored
- There are no "friendly" or "hostile" amendments, as there are no sponsors with whom to confer

== HMUN China ==
In March 2010, with the help of WELAND International, HMUN brought a chapter of its conference to Beijing for the first run of HMUN China with 13 committees and over 1,000 delegates.

In 2011, HMUN China moved to Shanghai. For 2012, HMUN China returned to Beijing, hosted in the Beijing International Convention Center, with 15 committees and over 1,000 delegates.

In 2013, HMUN China moved across town to the Crowne Plaza Sun Palace, increasing the conference to 16 committees for 1,300 delegates. The conference brought in students from over 27 countries to participate in four days of debate. The 2013 session increased the number and diversity of its committees, running 5 Specialized Agencies and a range of present-day and historical Regional Bodies, including simulations of the Global Health Cluster, the Pakatan Rakyat, and the 1814 Congress of Vienna.

Since 2015, HMUN has co-hosted with Alpha Partners Education. The 2016 session was held March 17–20 in Beijing.

== HMUN India ==
=== HMUN India 2011 - The First Session ===
In August 2011, over 1250 delegates from across India and some other countries (Pakistan, Sri Lanka, Turkey, etc.) took part in the first HMUN India session, which took place at World Trade Centre, Mumbai, India.

=== HMUN India 2012 - The Second Session ===
The second session of HMUN India took place at the Hyderabad International Convention Center in Hyderabad, India from the 16 to 19 August 2012. This was co-hosted by MUN Cafe- a brand of Worldview Education Services. HMUN India 2012 had over 900 delegates from 110 schools across 24 cities in over 15 countries. Karachi Grammar School, Pakistan was declared the Best Large Delegation at the conference.

=== HMUN India 2013 - The Third Session ===
The third session of HMUN India was recently held again at The Hyderabad International Convention Center from the 15th to 18 August. This was co-hosted yet again with MUN Cafe. The conference witnessed participation of over 1200 students from across 28 cities in 8 countries. The highlights of the 3rd session included the Speaker Series with an elite panel of speakers including the Key Note at the Opening Ceremony delivered by Dr. Rajendra Pachauri, Chair of the Nobel Peace Prize winner- 2007- The UN Inter-governmental panel on Climate Change. Karachi Grammar School, Pakistan retained its title as the Best Large Delegation at the conference.

=== HMUN India 2014 onwards ===
The fourth Session of HMUN was yet again held at the Hyderabad International Convention Center and co-hosted by Worldview Education. The conference saw a greater participation compared to its last session. This time the organizing committee experimented with something they called the Morning Plenary every morning for an hour wherein they re-capped what had been done the day before and showcased some of the entries for the HMUN India IMPACT awards - Videos of NGOs and groups working towards the accomplishment of the Millennium Development goals.

The Special Application committees in this session included

1. Security Council
2. Historical Security Council
3. English Civil War - Long Parliament
4. Press Corps

== Harvard Intercollegiate Model United Nations ==
Harvard Intercollegiate Model United Nations (ICMUN) is Harvard University's traveling, competitive Model UN team. The team is composed of about 60 Harvard undergraduates who attend conferences across the United States throughout the academic year. In the past, the team was headed by a pair of head delegates usually elected to the position during the second semester of their sophomore year, but, in 2019, the leadership structure changed to allow four head delegates who jointly manage the ICMUN program. The four head delegates serving for the 2025-2026 season are Kenith Taukolo, Addison Gaddy, Lucia Gallo, and Fayyaz Razi.

== Harvard International Review ==
The Harvard International Review is a quarterly journal and website of international relations published by the Harvard International Relations Council at Harvard University. The HIR offers commentary on global developments in politics, economics, business, science, technology, and culture, as well as interviews with prominent global leaders and reviews of books and documentaries. Founded in 1979 to "cover that middle ground between academic scholarship and journalism", the HIR is a widely distributed journal across the United States and around the world in more than 60 countries, boasting a readership of over 30,000. According to its mission statement, "The HIR features underappreciated topics in the international affairs discourse and underappreciated perspectives on more widely discussed topics. The HIR aims to serve as a trend-setter among similar publications by directing rather than following the public's attention."

The magazine is composed of the following sections: Features, Perspectives, Spotlight, World in Review, Global Notebook, Interview, Endpaper, and Correspondence. The website features exclusive content and active blogs on current events.

The HIR has featured scholars and policymakers from around the world, including Nelson Mandela, Samuel P. Huntington, Aung San Suu Kyi, Jeffrey Sachs, Shimon Peres, Paul Krugman, Chen Shui-bian, Amartya Sen, Gro Harlem Brundtland, Jimmy Carter, Zbigniew Brzezinski, Bill Clinton, Dick Cheney, Ban Ki-moon, N.R. Narayana Murthy, Ted Turner and Javier Solana.

== International Relations on Campus (IRoC) ==
IRoC is the IRC branch that coordinates all of the IRC's on-campus outreach. IRoC builds links among undergraduates, Harvard's Weatherhead Center, and Harvard professors and fellows. IRoC conducts dinner discussions, study groups, and special events, and is responsible for putting on IR Week every Spring.

IRoC is currently led by Co-presidents Emma de Jong and Alexandra Oikonomou.

== Harvard Program for International Education ==
The Harvard Program for International Education (HPIE) is a public service program run and staffed by Harvard undergraduates passionate about international relations. HPIE seeks to promote international awareness and education in today's youth. HPIE tutors teach from a standardized curriculum that they develop on-campus and distribute to students on-site. HPIE tutors go through the curriculum, which incorporates useful skills students can use in their other studies, over the course of eight sessions, with one class period each week. Previous curricula have included topics in immigration, nation-building, and the politics of clean water. Curricula culminate in a short conference that brings students together for HPIE Day, an exciting day of debate on the Harvard campus. HPIE Day allows students to demonstrate what their acquired skills.

The Harvard Program for International Education is currently led by co-Executive Directors Sammy Tin and Tasia Avery.

== Model Security Council ==
Model Security Council (MSC) is the organization in charge of student recruitment for all IRC programs. Though individual programs conduct their own recruitment and outreach events, MSC conducts IRC-wide promotion for all programs and communication with the incoming class of new students every year. It is in charge of running a series of events during the "Visitas" weekend at the end of April where admitted Harvard students can come to explore the campus in Cambridge, MA. MSC also refers to the one-day conference that the organization runs during the first week on September geared towards incoming Harvard freshmen but open and welcoming to all new members which includes a Model UN simulation and workshops about IRC programs. The conference gives participants a taste of the competitive and staffing sides of Model UN and an introduction to the business, technology, education, and debate opportunities available in the IRC. The conference is preceded by a Welcome Week that exposes incoming freshmen to the opportunities and events offered by the IRC, and has a special emphasis on creating communities for freshmen in many of their first years away from home.

The co-presidents of MSC are elected by the IRC board of directors and serve a one-year term where they manage the full-cycle recruitment of first-year students from "Visitas" to MSC proper. The organization divides itself into Administration, Business, Programs, Communication, and Mentorship divisions.

Model Security Council 2025 is currently led by co-presidents Emily Chen and Kaitlin Cascio.

== See also ==
- Model United Nations
- Harvard Model Congress
- Harvard World Model United Nations
- Yale International Relations Association
