= Klaus Hopt =

Klaus Jürgen Hopt (born 24 August 1940 in Tuttlingen, Germany) is a German jurist, specialised in the field of German and international commercial law.

== Academic career ==
Klaus J. Hopt studied law, economics and political science at LMU Munich, the University of Tübingen, the University of Bilbao, the University of Paris, and New York University as of 1959. After obtaining his PhD (Dr. iur.) at LMU Munich in 1967 with the title "Schadensersatz aus unberechtigter Verfahrenseinleitung. Eine rechtsvergleichende Untersuchung zum Schutz gegen unberechtigte Inanspruchnahme staatlicher Verfahren” and his PhD (Dr. phil.) at the University of Tübingen in 1968 („Die Dritte Gewalt als politischer Faktor. Eine Fallstudie zur Reform der Wahlkreiseinteilung in den USA.“), he qualified as a professor at LMU Munich in 1973 with a thesis on investor protection in banking law. From 1974 to 1978, Hopt was a professor at the University of Tübingen, from 1978 to 1980 at the European University of Florence, from 1980 to 1985 again at the University of Tübingen, from 1985 to 1987 at the University of Bern and from 1987 to 1995 at LMU Munich. From 1995 until his retirement in 2008, Hopt was Director at the Max Planck Institute for Comparative and International Private Law in Hamburg, where he continues to pursue his research today. Hopt is editor and author of numerous books, including the commentary on the German Commercial Code (HGB), and author of over 350 articles on German and European commercial, corporate, banking, stock exchange and business law in over 20 languages.

=== Visiting professorships ===
Klaus Hopt has had numerous visiting professorships: in 1979 at the University of Pennsylvania in Philadelphia/USA, in 1981 and 1983 at the European University of Florence, in 1987 at the University of Paris I (Sorbonne), in 1988 at the University of Kyōto in Japan, from 1989 to 1990 at the Université libre de Bruxelles in Belgium, in 1991 at the University of Geneva and the University of Tokyo, in 1994 at the University of Chicago, in 1999 and 2006 at New York University (Global Faculty)/USA, in 2002 at Harvard University, from 2002 to 2003 at Tilburg University, in 2003, 2004 and 2005 at the University of Paris II (Panthéon-Assas), in 2007 and 2008 at LUISS University in Rome, in 2008 at the Catholic University of Portugal in Lisbon, in 2010 at Columbia University and in 2013 at the University of Vienna and Vienna University of Economics and Business.

== Additional activities (selection) ==
From 1981 to 1985, Hopt was a judge at the Higher Regional Court of Stuttgart. From 1995 to 2001, he was a member of the former Takeover Commission; from 2002 to 2007, he was a member of the Takeover Advisory Board formed at the German Federal Financial Supervisory Authority (BaFin) in accordance with Section 5 of the German Securities Acquisition and Takeover Act (WpÜG). From 2000 to 2012, Hopt was a member of the deputation of the German Jurists' Conference (DJT). He was also a member of the High Level Group of Company Law Experts advising the European Commission in Brussels from 2001 to 2002. From 2002 to 2012, he was a member of the Stock Exchange Expert Commission. From 2002 to 2008, Hopt was also Vice President of the German Research Foundation (Deutsche Forschungsgemeinschaft). From 2003 to 2006, he served as Chairman of the Scientific Council of the Max Planck Gesellschaft and from 2003 to 2005 as a member of the Supervisory Board of Deutsche Börse AG. He has also worked as an expert for the German Bundestag, the Federal Constitutional Court, the Federal Ministry of Finance, the Federal Ministry of Justice, the Federal Ministry of Economics and Technology, the Bundesbank, the European Commission, the Bank for International Settlements, Bulgaria and the World Bank, among others.

== Honors and memberships ==
=== Honorary doctorates (Dr. iur. h.c.) ===
- 1997: Université libre de Bruxelles
- 1997: Université catholique de Louvain
- 2000: Université René Descartes Paris V
- 2007: National and Kapodistrian University of Athens
- 2010: Ivane Javakhishvili Tbilisi State University

=== Memberships and awards ===
- 2008: Member of the German National Academy of Sciences Leopoldina in Halle (since 2008)
- 2008: Mentorship award from the Claussen Simon Foundation (2008)
- 2009: Federal Cross of Merit First Class (Bundesverdienstkreuz I. Klasse) (2009)
- 2010: Bucerius Law School Hamburg, Medal of honor for special merits (2010)

== Works (selection) ==
- Handelsgesetzbuch, Beck'scher Kurz-Kommentar by Hopt, Munich, 44th Ed. 2025, ed. with Kumpan, Leyens, Merkt, Roth
- Unternehmensführung durch Vorstand und Aufsichtsrat - Aktien-, Kapitalmarkt- und Bilanzrecht, Corporate Governance – Handbuch, München 2024, ed. with Hommelhoff and Leyens
- Schuldverschreibungsrecht, Köln, 2nd Ed. 2023, ed. with Seibt
- Der Aufsichtsrat: Aktienrecht und Corporate Governance, Sonderausgabe aus dem Großkommentar zum Aktiengesetz §§ 95 bis 116 AktG, Berlin 2019, ed. with Roth
- The Anatomy of Corporate Law, A Comparative and Functional Approach, 3rd Ed., Oxford, 2017, with Kraakman et al.
- Corporate Boards in Law and Practice, A Comparative Analysis in Europe, Oxford 2013, ed. with Davies et al.
- Corporate Governance in Context: Corporations, States, and Markets in Europe, Japan, and the U.S., Oxford 2005, ed. with Wymeersch, Kanda and Baum
- La Société européenne, Organisation juridique et fiscale, intérêts, perspectives, sous la direction de K. J. Hopt, M. Menjucq, E. Wymeersch, Paris (Dalloz) 2003
- Prospekt- und Kapitalmarktinformationshaftung – Recht und Reform in der Europäischen Union, der Schweiz und den USA, Tübingen 2005, ed.with Voigt
- Reports of the High Level Group of Company Law Experts: A Modern Regulatory Framework for Company Law in Europe, 4 November 2002, and Report on Issues Related to Takeover Bids, Report of the High Level Group of Company Law Experts, 10 January 2002, European Commission, Brussels, with Winter (chairman), Christensen, Garrido Garcia, Rickford, Rossi, Simon, with translations into several official EU languages.
- Stiftungsrecht in Europa, Köln 2001, ed. with Reuter
- Comparative Corporate Governance, Oxford 1998, ed. with Kanda, Roe, Wymeersch, Prigge
- Börsenreform – Eine ökonomische, rechtsvergleichende und rechtspolitische Untersuchung, 1997, ed. with Rudolph and Baum
- Aktiengesetz, Großkommentar, 4th Ed., Berlin 1992 ff., ed. with Wiedemann
- Gutachten für den 51. Deutschen Juristentag, Inwieweit empfiehlt sich eine allgemeine gesetzliche Regelung des Anlegerschutzes?, Munich 1976
- Der Kapitalanlegerschutz im Recht der Banken (Habilitationsschrift), Munich 1975
- Europäisches Insiderrecht, Einführende Untersuchung – Ausgewählte Materialien, Stuttgart 1973, with Will
- Die Dritte Gewalt als politischer Faktor. Eine Fallstudie zur Reform der Wahlkreiseinteilung in den USA, Berlin 1969
- Schadensersatz aus unberechtigter Verfahrenseinleitung. Eine rechtsvergleichende Untersuchung zum Schutz gegen unberechtigte Inanspruchnahme staatlicher Verfahren, Munich 1968

== Commemorative publications, commemorative booklets, symposia ==
=== Commemorative publications ===
- Harald Baum et al. (ed): Perspektiven des Wirtschaftsrechts Deutsches, europäisches und internationales Handels-, Gesellschafts- und Kapitalmarktrecht. Beiträge für Klaus J. Hopt aus Anlass seiner Emeritierung, Berlin, De Gruyter 2008, 526 p., ISBN 978-3-89949-5-768.
- Stefan Grundmann et al. (ed): Festschrift für Klaus J. Hopt zum 70. Geburtstag am 24. August 2010 Unternehmen, Markt und Verantwortung, Berlin, De Gruyter 2010, 3447 p., ISBN 978-3-89949-6-321.
- Stefan Grundmann et al. (ed): Festschrift für Klaus J. Hopt zum 80. Geburtstag am 24. August 2020, Berlin, De Gruyter 2020, 1592 p., ISBN 978-3-11-066565-9.
- 80. Klaus J. Hopt, Beiträge der „Ehemaligen“ aus 50 Jahren Lehrtätigkeit zum 80. Geburtstag von Professor Klaus J. Hopt, Salzhausen 2020, 124 p.

=== Commemorative booklets ===
- Klaus J. Hopt zum 60. Geburtstag, Rabels Zeitschrift für ausländisches und internationales Privatrecht 64 (2000) Heft 3 (august), p. 455–659.
- „Corporate Governance – European Perspectives“ zum 60. Geburtstag von Klaus J. Hopt, Symposium, Universität Mainz, Zeitschrift für Unternehmens- und Gesellschaftsrecht (ZGR), 2001, p. 215–324.
- In Honour of Professor Klaus Hopt, International and Comparative Corporate Law Journal 2 (2000) Issue 4 (September 2001) III, p. 415–501.
- In Honour of Klaus J. Hopt, European Company and Financial Law Review, June 2006, Vol. 3 No. 2 (p. 121–236).

=== Symposia ===
- Symposium „Comparative Company Law“ in honour of Professor Klaus J. Hopt, Humboldt University Berlin, 2–3 September 2005.
- Hopt & Eisenberg Symposium „Corporate Governance and Corporate Social Responsibility“, Tokyo (Japan Corporate Auditors Association and Center for Japanese Corporation Law Studies, Doshisha University Kyoto) and „Corporate Governance and Soft Law“, Kyoto (Doshisha University Kyoto). 16 and 20 June 2006.
- Symposium „Kapitalmarktunion“ zum 75. Geburtstag von Klaus J. Hopt, Universität Tübingen, 20–21 November 2015; publication of lectures: Christoph Kumpan, ZGR 2016, 2; Niamh Moloney, ECFR 2016, 376; Wolfgang Schön, ECFR 2016, 424; Jens Binder, ZEuP 2017, 569.

== Literature ==
- Grundmann, Klaus J. Hopt, in: Grundmann/Riesenhuber, Hrsg., Deutschsprachige Zivilrechtslehrer des 20. Jahrhunderts in Berichten ihrer Schüler, Eine Ideengeschichte in Einzeldarstellungen, Bd. 2, Berlin (De Gruyter) 2010, S. 221–259.
- Grundmann, Klaus J. Hopt (1940), in: Grundmann/Riesenhuber, eds., Private Law Development in Context, German Private Law and Scholarship in the 20th Century, Cambridge et al. (intersentia), 2018, S. 571–609.
