= Universidad Metropolitana =

Coordinates: 10°29′58″N 66°47′05″W

Metropolitan University
- Universidad Metropolitana
- Logo of Universidad Metropolitana
- Motto: Enseñando el Camino (Spanish)
- Motto in English: Teaching the Way
- Type: Private
- Established: 1970
- Rector: Marisa Guinand
- Students: 5,000 (approx.)
- Location: (Venezuela) Caracas, Venezuela
- Campus: Urban, 247 acres (1.00 km^{2})
- Website: www.unimet.edu.ve

The Metropolitan University (Spanish: Universidad Metropolitana) (Unimet) is a Venezuelan university founded in 1970 by a group of entrepreneurs led by Eugenio Mendoza Goiticoa in the terrains donated by the businessman Pius Schlageter, father of the Venezuelan painter Eduardo Schlageter. It is in the Terrazas del Ávila section of Caracas.

== History ==
The university started as a nonprofit organization in 1964 with a mission to develop the curricula for what would become the "Universidad Metropolitana". On 1 October 1970, the "Consejo Nacional de Universidades" approved the plans and projects of the fledgling university.

The first campus was located on the old building of the "Colegio America" in the district of San Bernardino, and began classes on 22 October of that same year.

The first class of 198 students could choose between five undergraduate degrees:

1. Mechanical engineering
2. Electrical engineering
3. Chemical engineering
4. Mathematics
5. Business and Administration

In 1976 the campus was moved to its current location on the eastern city district of "Terrazas del Ávila."

Today, the university has 5,000 students and approximately 500 professors. It is a business-oriented private university, and so offers a Business Administration course.

The academic undergraduate courses include: Economics, Accounting, Business Administration, Law, Education, Modern Languages, Engineering (Chemical, Mechanic, Systems, Electrical, Civil and Production) and Psychology. In 2003, it became the first university in Venezuela to offer a Liberal Studies course.

== Degrees ==
It offers the following undergraduate programs (B.Sc.):

- College of Arts and Sciences:
  - Applied Mathematics
  - Psychology
  - Modern Languages
  - Education
- College of Engineering:
  - Civil Engineering
  - Chemical Engineering
  - Electrical Engineering
  - Mechanical Engineering
  - Production Engineering
  - Systems Engineering
- College of Social and Humanistic Sciences:
  - Business Administration
  - Economics
  - Public Accounting
- College of Legal and Political Studies
  - Law
  - Liberal Studies (Politics, Philosophy and Economics)
