= Harvard International Review =

American newsmagazine

- Type: Quarterly newsmagazine
- Format: Magazine
- Publisher: Harvard International Relations Council
- Editor-in-chief: Cate Buchan and William Tan
- Founded: 1979
- Language: English
- Headquarters: 59 Shepard St. #205; Cambridge, MA 02138; United States
- ISSN: 0739-1854
- Website: hir.harvard.edu

The Harvard International Review (HIR) is a quarterly international relations journal published by the Harvard International Relations Council at Harvard University. The HIR offers commentary on global developments in politics, economics, business, science, technology, and culture, as well as interviews with global leaders.

== Structure ==
The magazine features quarterly cover topics, broad surveys of developments in international relations (collectively referred to as the Global Notebook), outside perspectives, and interviews. Cover topics in recent years have included analyses of the role agriculture plays in international development, the erosion of trust in modern institutions, and the trade-offs between compromise and defiance.

Various boards within the HIR also work to copy-edit articles, design the print magazine, connect with new subscribers and advertisers, and maintain the magazine's website and social media presence. The HIR's website features exclusive content and active blogs on current events. In all, the magazine has a growing readership of over 200,000.

== History ==
The HIR was founded in 1979 by a group of undergraduate students in the Harvard International Relations Council, allowing students to analyze foreign affairs in an academic and journalistic forum. After monthly publication early on, the HIR pivoted to quarterly distribution, and began soliciting the perspectives of prominent figures in international relations.

To date, the magazine has featured articles or interviews from over 40 presidents and prime ministers, four UN Secretaries-General, four Nobel Economics Prize laureates, and seven Nobel Peace Prize laureates.

== Notable alumni ==
Notable Harvard alumni to have been staff members of the Harvard International Review include Philip A. Brimmer, Erik Brynjolfsson, Congresswoman Elizabeth Esty, Bernard Hebda, Stephen A. Higginson, Ambassador Philip S. Kosnett, David Laibson, Simpsons writer Jeff Martin, Robert McCord, Marc Rotenberg, Phillip Steck, John Weston, Leah Litman, and M. Edward Whelan III.
